= Zacatepec Chatino =

Zapotecan language of Oaxaca, Mexico

- Chatino de San Marcos Zacatepec
- Cha’ jna’a
- Native to: Mexico
- Region: Oaxaca, Southern Central Mexico
- Native speakers: 300 (2015)
- Language family: Oto-Manguean: Zapotecan; Chatino; Eastern Chatino; Zacatepec Chatino

Language codes
- ISO 639-3: ctz
- Glottolog: zaca1242 Zacatepec Chatino
- ELP: Eastern Chatino

Zacatepec Chatino is an indigenous Mesoamerican language, a dialect of Eastern Chatino of the Oto-Manguean language family. It is often referred to as Chaqꟳ tinyaᴶ Kichenᴬ tziꟲ, Chatino de San Marcos Zacatepec, or Chatino de Zacatepec as it is distinct from other Eastern Chatino dialects in the region. Zacatepec Chatino is spoken in the town of San Marcos Zacatepec, a town of approximately 1,000 people and inhabited by the Chatino people. The language was once spoken in the village of Juquila, but is now virtually extinct there with only two surviving speakers in the area (Villard 2015).

Zacatepec Chatino is a highly endangered language as it is spoken by about 300 Chatinos whom are all above 50 years of age.

== Classification ==
Chatino refers to three closely related modern languages; the three being Eastern Chatino, Tataltepec Chatino, and Zenzontepec Chatino of the Zapotecan branch. Zacatepec Chatino falls under the Eastern Chatino branch.

Zacatepec Chatino, being part of Chatino language family, has shallow orthography. It is more conservative than many other varieties of Eastern Chatino as it conserves many non-final unstressed vowels which have been lost in other varieties.

== History ==
Little is known about the history of Zacatepec Chatino but according to Stéphanie Villard who studied and presented her thesis on the language, it has been on a decline for the past 40 years as natives continue to expand their ties with non-Chatino communities. With the help of the Zacatepec Chatino Documentation Project, Villard has uncovered some of the remnants of the language with the help of many natives from the area. The project includes visits in 2005 and 2006 by Hilaria Cruz, Emiliana Cruz, Megan Crowhurst as well as preliminary analysis of tones in H. Cruz y Woodbury in 2006. It also includes intensive work since 2006 by Stéphanie Villard, including 150 hours of audio, a sketch, papers on sandhi and inflection and grammar as well as short visits concentrating on textual documentation, tone, & morphology

Although Spanish is the official language in San Marcos Zacatepec, Oaxaca, many government officials communicate in Zacatepec Chatino. A study conducted by Villard revealed that majority of the younger population are monolingual Spanish speakers.

== Geographic distribution ==
Zacatepec Chatino is only spoken in San Marcos Zacatepec, Oaxaca in the Sierra Madre region of Mexico.

=== Dialects/Varieties ===
Since Zacatepec Chatino is unintelligible with other Chatino varieties, it does not have any other dialects or varieties associated with it.

== Phonology ==
Villard (2015) reports that Zacatepec Chatino presents voicing of non-continuant after nasals, vowel harmony, and contrastive nasal vowels. It has 4 levels of pitch ranging from low to high. It also presents 15 specific tonal sequences that can define 15 lexical classes, as well as intricate sandhi patterns.

=== Consonants ===
	Bilabial	Dental/ Alveolar	Laminal- alveolar	Palatal	Velar		Glottal
	Bilabial	Dental/ Alveolar	Laminal- alveolar	Palatal	plain	lab.	Glottal
Plosive	p, (b)	t, (d)	t̻		k	kʷ	ʔ
Affricate		t͡s		t͡ʃ			
Fricative		s		ʃ			h
Nasal	m	n	n̻		(ŋ)		
Rhotic		(ɾ, r̥)					
Approximant		l	l̻	j		w	

- Consonants in parentheses only exist as a result of Spanish loanwords.
- When following a nasal segment, the consonants /p, t, t̻, t͡s, t͡ʃ, k, kʷ/ can be voiced to [b, d, d̻, d͡z, d͡ʒ, ɡ, ɡʷ].
- /l, l̻/ have rare voiceless allophones of [l̥, l̻̥], when following a glottal /h/.
- /w/ can have allophones of [β, b, ʍ]. [β] before front vowels, [b] before a /j/, and [ʍ] when following a /h/.
- /n/ can assimilate to a velar [ŋ] when preceding a velar /k, kʷ/.

=== Vowels ===
There are nine vowel sounds, including both oral and nasal variants:

	Front		Back	
	oral	nasal	oral	nasal
Close	i	ɪ̃	u	ũ
Mid	e	ɛ̃	o	
Open	a			ɑ̃

- /o/ can be heard as [ɔ] when followed by a glottal /ʔ/.

/a/ does not present any restrictions in its distribution. /a/ is pronounced [a] and may be slightly nasalized. Here are some examples:

nǎ [na] thing

pa̋ [pa] dad

kwā ́ [kwa] already

mpaà ̋ [mbaː] godfather

Wyàa̋ [bjaː] Santos Reyes Nopala, Oaxaca

chǎʔ [t͜ʃaʔ] word

/e/ does not occur after the nasal stop /n/. /e/ can be long in final syllables and short in non final syllables. Here are some examples:

traʔwē ́ [traʔwe] middle

tikèʔ [tikeʔ] aroused

siyěʔ [sijeʔ] dressed up

tsaʔwě [t͜saʔwe] good

nkyaseʔ [ŋgjaseʔ] it got deflated

nkyanè [ŋgjanɛ]̃ he/she sprayed it

nkyaʔwè [ŋgjaʔwe] it got split

/i/ occurs in final as well as non-final syllables of roots followed by a /ʔ/. It is slightly restricted in its distribution. Here are some examples:

pi̋ [pi] poult

pìi̋ [piː] fair skinned, pale

lyiʔ̋ [li̻ʔ] parrot

mpiʔ̋ [mbiʔ] dram

kiiʔ [kiːʔ] fire

The distribution of /u/ is highly restricted. /u/ in monosyllabic words is rare. /u/ can be long in final syllables but is always short in non-final syllables. Here are some examples:

xǔʔ [ʃuʔ] oldster

chūú [t͜ʃuː] Jesus

sùntū ̋ [suntu] issue (from Spa. asunto)

bùrrū ̋ [bur̥u] donkey (from Spa. burro)

kuʔwǐ [kuʔwi] drunk

suti [suti] his/her father

tuʔwa [tuʔwa] his/her mouth

/o/ is restricted as well. It does not occur after the nasal stop /n/ and similarly to /u/, /o/ does not occur after the labiovelars /kʷ/ or /w/. Here are some examples

Tyò ̋ [to̻] Pedro

kōō [koː] fog

yo [jo] guy

yoo [joː] soil

pìxō ̋ [piʃo] peso

=== Tones ===
Tonal Representation	Marking	Realization
X(toneless)	a	Low falling
L(ow)	à	Low falling
M(id)	ā	Mid level
H(igh)	á	High level
LH	â	Low to high rising
LS	a̋	Low to super-high rising

== Grammar ==
=== Morphology ===
San Marcos Zacatepec is considered a head-marking language as it is synthetic and analytic. Some functions are the language are mixed; for example, person marking can be signaled through tone contrast and/or nasalization, encliticization, or also by a separate word.

Its verbal morphology features a large inventory of allomorphs of its aspectual morphemes, which makes its verbal paradigms appear extremely irregular.

The sequence classes are "morphological"—some are specialized by part-of-speech, by inflectional category, or loan provenance, while others are open-ended and general.

=== Syntax ===
The basic word order is VSO but there are other orders present. Here is an example of the Chatino Language VSO:

N-da nu xniʔ ndaha ska ha xtlya ʔi nu ʔo
CON-give the dog lazy one tortilla Spanish to the Coyote
'The lazy dog gave a sweetbread to the coyote'

Some morphemes, such as the marker ʔin have various functions in the grammar as it is a dative marker. The dative marker introduces human direct objects, indirect objects, and also marks alienable possession.

Compounding patterns play an important role and word formation. the use of combinations of "light nouns" or semantically poor nouns and semantically rich adjectives (or nouns, although very rarely) is very prolific in the language. Villard provides us with an example of such formations: the light noun nu 'the one who', often occurs as a head noun in noun phrases, as in nu kīʔyó 'man' (the one who is male) or nu kunāʔán 'woman' (the one who is female).

== Vocabulary ==
There are 15 lexical tone classes defined by 15 tone sequences. The sequences pertain to any noncompound stem but have different realizations depending on the number of moras in the stem. The sequence classes are "morphological"—some are specialized by part-of-speech, by inflectional category, or loan provenance, while others are open ended and general. Sequence class identity—not tones—determines tonal ablaut behavior and tonal inflectional classes. The progressive aspect is associated with an M tone which generates composed sequences beyond the original 15

== Bibliography ==
- Villard, Stephanie (2008). Grammatical sketch of Zacatepec Chatino (Master thesis). The University of Texas at Austin. hdl:2152/43815.
- Villard S. Zacatepec Chatino verb classification and aspect morphology. Archive of the Languages of Latin America. 2010.
- Villard, Stéphanie (2010), "Zacatepec Chatino verb classification and aspect morphology", Las Memorias del Congreso de Idiomas Indígenas de …
- Villard, Stephanie (2015). The phonology and morphology of Zacatepec eastern Chatino (PhD thesis). The University of Texas at Austin. hdl:2152/31492.
- Woodbury, Anthony C. (2018-03-17), The exuberant tonal system of San Marcos Zacatepec Eastern Chatino, Texas Data Repository, doi:10.18738/t8/bgpa1o
