= Juquila District =

- District
- Oaxaca regions and districts: Costa region in the Southwest
- Coordinates: 16°14′N 97°18′W
- Country: Mexico
- State: Oaxaca

Population (2020)
  - Total: 170,673

Juquila District is located in the center of the Costa Region of the State of Oaxaca, Mexico, on the Pacific coast. It has an area of 5,055 km^{2}. As of 2020 it had a total population of 170,673 of whom 33,106 spoke an indigenous language. Economic activities include agriculture and tourism. The Santuario (Sanctuary) de Juquila is a major attraction.

== Environment ==
The district lies on the Pacific coast of southwestern Oaxaca, with generally hilly land rising to the southern edge of the Sierra Madre del Sur. The coastal climate is hot and humid, while inland the climate is warm and humid. The western part of the district includes the Lagunas de Chacahua National Park, which includes the lagoons of Chacahua, La Pastoria, Las Salinas.

== Economy ==
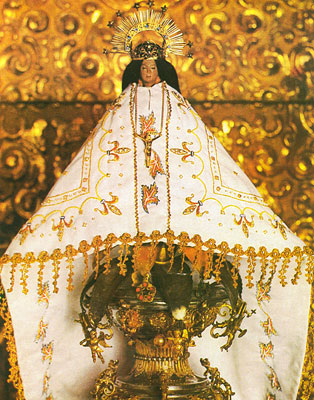
Virgen de Juquila

The most important economic activity is agriculture, including cultivation of maize, beans and vegetables for personal consumption. The people practice animal husbandry on a small scale, and some also hunt and fish. Coffee is grown inland, and various types of fruit near the coast. Tourism is important in the coastal region, particularly in Puerto Escondido.

The town of Santa Catarina Juquila is known for the Santuario (Sanctuary) de Juquila, which houses a 30 cm statue of the Virgin Mary, which has been venerated since the 16th century. In 1633, it survived, completely intact, a fire that destroyed the village in which it was originally located. At the beginning of the 18th century, it was moved to its current location where the sanctuary was built for it. Thousands visit this Virgin from across the state of Oaxaca, other parts of Mexico and abroad.

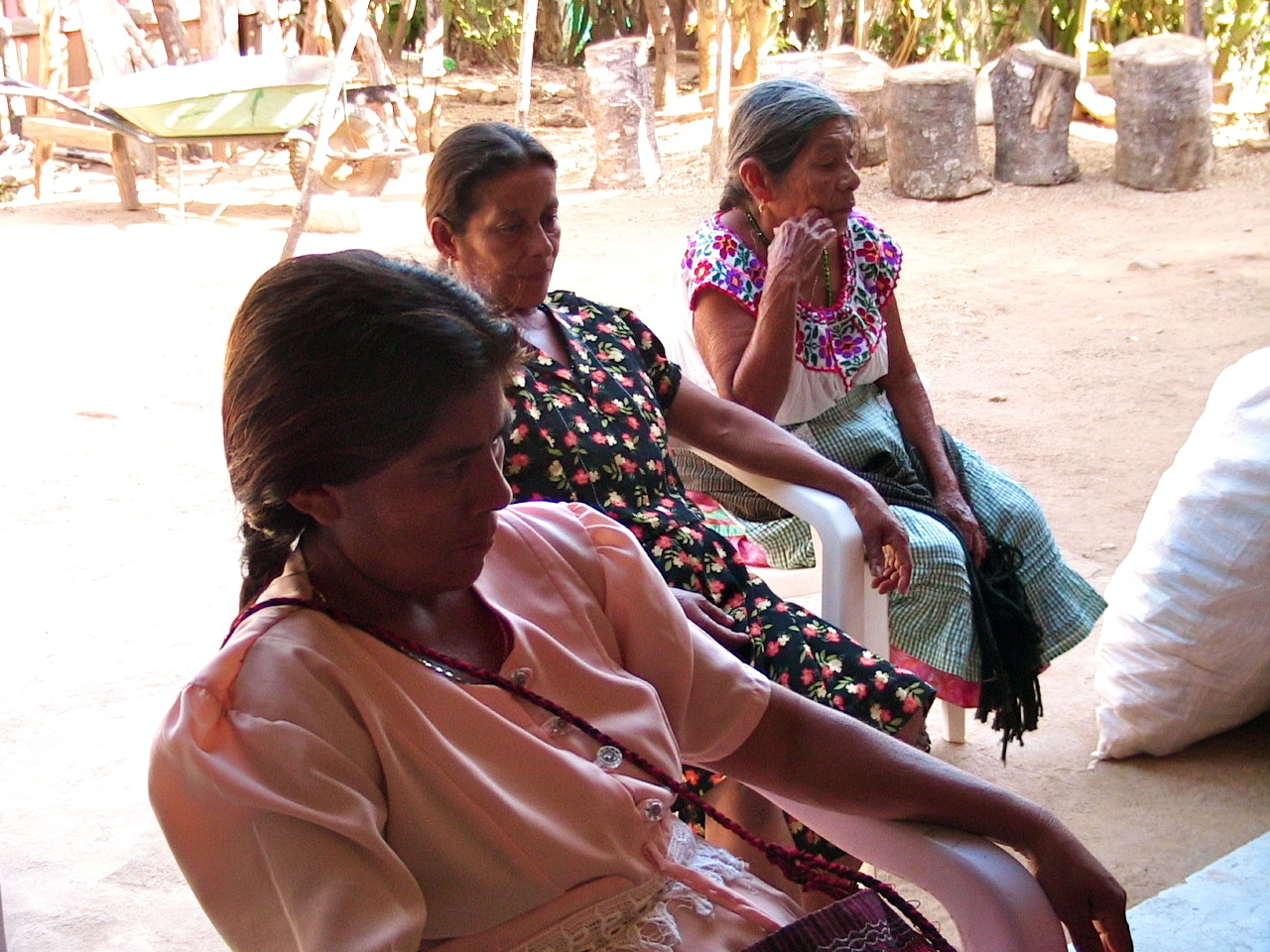
Women at a meeting in San Miguel Panixtlahuaca

== Indigenous people ==
The district roughly coincides with the area occupied by the Chatino people before the Spanish arrived, a group with close cultural and linguistic ties with the Zapotec people. The Chatino language is still widely spoken in inland communities such as San Miguel Panixtlahuaca, Santa María Temaxcaltepec and Santiago Yaitepec. The ruins of the capital of the Chatino state are preserved near Santos Reyes Nopala, and include large stone buildings, ball courts and pyramids.

The area in the west of Villa de Tututepec de Melchor Ocampo was occupied by a small Mixtec kingdom established in 357 AD.

== Municipalities ==
The district includes the following municipalities:

Municipalities of Juquila district

| Municipality code | Name | Population | | Land Area | | | Population density | |
| Municipality code | Name | 2020 | Rank | km^{2} | sq mi | Rank | 2020 | Rank |
|---|---|---|---|---|---|---|---|---|
| 153 | San Gabriel Mixtepec | 4,910 | 7 | 178.4 | 68.9 | 8 | 22/km^{2} (57/sq mi) | 11 |
| 202 | San Juan Lachao | 4,577 | 8 | 209.5 | 80.9 | 6 | 22/km^{2} (57/sq mi) | 10 |
| 213 | San Juan Quiahije | 4,203 | 10 | 203.9 | 78.7 | 7 | 21/km^{2} (53/sq mi) | 12 |
| 272 | San Miguel Panixtlahuaca | 6,252 | 6 | 144.2 | 55.7 | 9 | 43/km^{2} (112/sq mi) | 5 |
| 314 | San Pedro Juchatengo | 1,755 | 12 | 58.24 | 22.49 | 10 | 30/km^{2} (78/sq mi) | 7 |
| 318 | San Pedro Mixtepec-Distrito 22 | 49,780 | 2 | 325.1 | 125.5 | 3 | 153/km^{2} (397/sq mi) | 1 |
| 364 | Santa Catarina Juquila | 18,654 | 3 | 637.8 | 246.3 | 2 | 29/km^{2} (76/sq mi) | 8 |
| 433 | Santa María Temaxcaltepec | 2,694 | 11 | 34.72 | 13.41 | 12 | 78/km^{2} (201/sq mi) | 3 |
| 497 | Santiago Yaitepec | 4,233 | 9 | 40.95 | 15.81 | 11 | 103/km^{2} (268/sq mi) | 2 |
| 526 | Santos Reyes Nopala | 16,688 | 4 | 226.1 | 87.3 | 4 | 74/km^{2} (191/sq mi) | 4 |
| 543 | Tataltepec de Valdés | 6,386 | 5 | 220.3 | 85.1 | 5 | 29/km^{2} (75/sq mi) | 9 |
| 334 | Villa de Tututepec de Melchor Ocampo | 50,541 | 1 | 1,216 | 470 | 1 | 42/km^{2} (108/sq mi) | 6 |
| | Distrito Juquila | 170,673 | — | 2,981 | 1,349.43 | — | 49/km^{2} (126/sq mi) | — |
Source: INEGI

=== Largest cities ===
Largest cities or towns in Juquila Distric Source:
| Rank | | Municipality | Pop. |
|---|---|---|---|
| 1 | Puerto Escondido | San Pedro Mixtepec-Distrito 22 | 29,903 |
| 2 | Río Grande | Villa de Tututepec de Melchor Ocampo | 15,373 |
| 3 | Santa Catarina Juquila | Santa Catarina Juquila | 8,084 |
| 4 | Bajos de Chila | San Pedro Mixtepec-Distrito 22 | 6,694 |
| 5 | San Miguel Panixtlahuaca | San Miguel Panixtlahuaca | 5,890 |
| 6 | Santos Reyes Nopala | Santos Reyes Nopala | 5,876 |
| 7 | San Pedro Mixtepec | San Pedro Mixtepec-Distrito 22 | 5,103 |
| 8 | San José del Progreso | Villa de Tututepec de Melchor Ocampo | 5,029 |
| 9 | San Gabriel Mixtepec | San Gabriel Mixtepec | 3,673 |
| 10 | Tataltepec de Valdés | Tataltepec de Valdés | 3,064 |

== Gallery ==
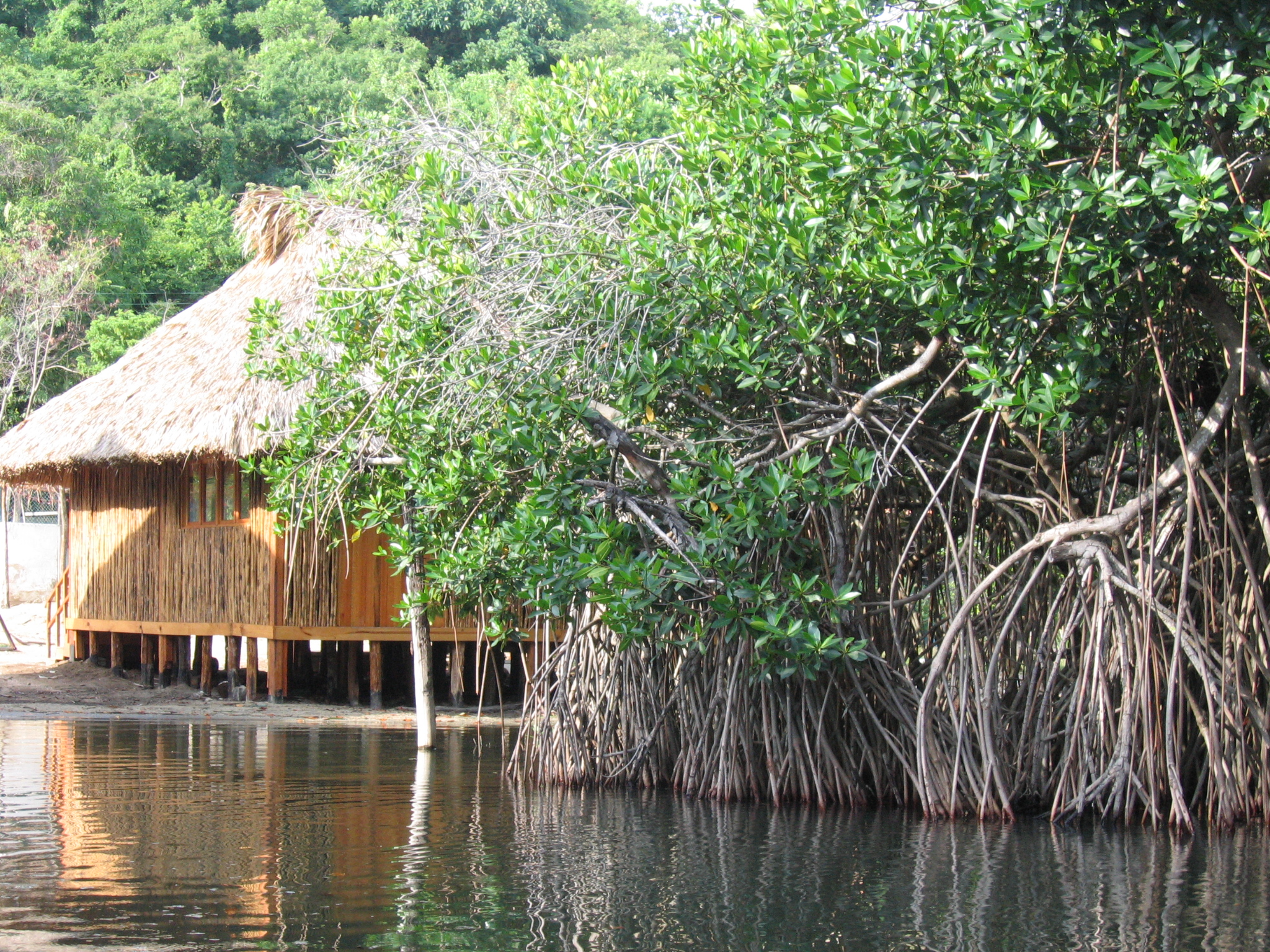
Stilt house on Chacahua lagoon

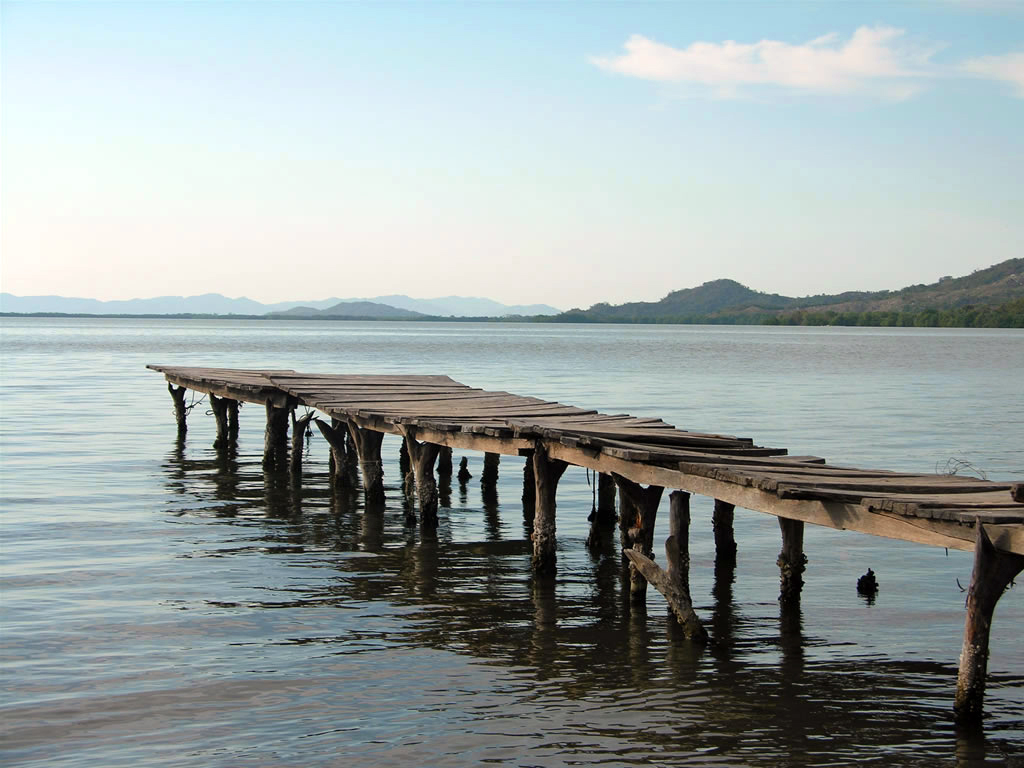
Pier in Cacahua lagoon

A view of Puerto Escondido in San Pedro Mixtepec municipality
