= San Miguel Panixtlahuaca =

San Miguel Panixtlahuaca Kchinᴬ Skwiᴱ
- Municipality and town
- Location in Mexico
- Coordinates: 16°15′N 97°23′W
- Country: Mexico
- State: Oaxaca

Area
  - Total: 264.1 km^{2} (102.0 sq mi)

Population (2005)
  - Total: 5,724
- Time zone: UTC-6 (Central Standard Time)

San Miguel Panixtlahuaca (Highland Chatino: Kchinᴬ Skwiᴱ, Tataltepec Chatino: Scui) is a town and municipality in Oaxaca in south-western Mexico. It is part of the Juquila District in the center of the Costa Region. The name "Panixtlahuatl" in the Nahuatl language means "Plain of the Bridge".

== Geography ==
The municipality covers an area of 264.1 square kilometres (102.0 sq mi) at an altitude of 770 metres (2,530 ft) above sea level. The climate is warm or temperate, with average temperatures between 22–16 °C (72–61 °F). The terrain is hilly, in the foothills of the Sierra Madre del Sur.

=== Flora and fauna ===
There is a wide range of flowers, edible and medicinal plants and trees.

Birds include red-billed pigeon, quail, macaw, parrot, chachalaca, parakeet, magpies, woodpeckers, eagles, crows, buzzards, owls, doves, canaries, vultures, partridges, herons and roadrunners. Wild Animals include cat, coyotes, wild boar, badgers, leopard, martens, foxes, raccoons, bobcat, porcupines, skunks, weasels, dogs, bear, anteaters, opossums, gophers and squirrels. There are coral snakes, green and black iguanas, scorpions, rattlesnakes, boa constrictors, milk snakes, thread snakes and chameleons.

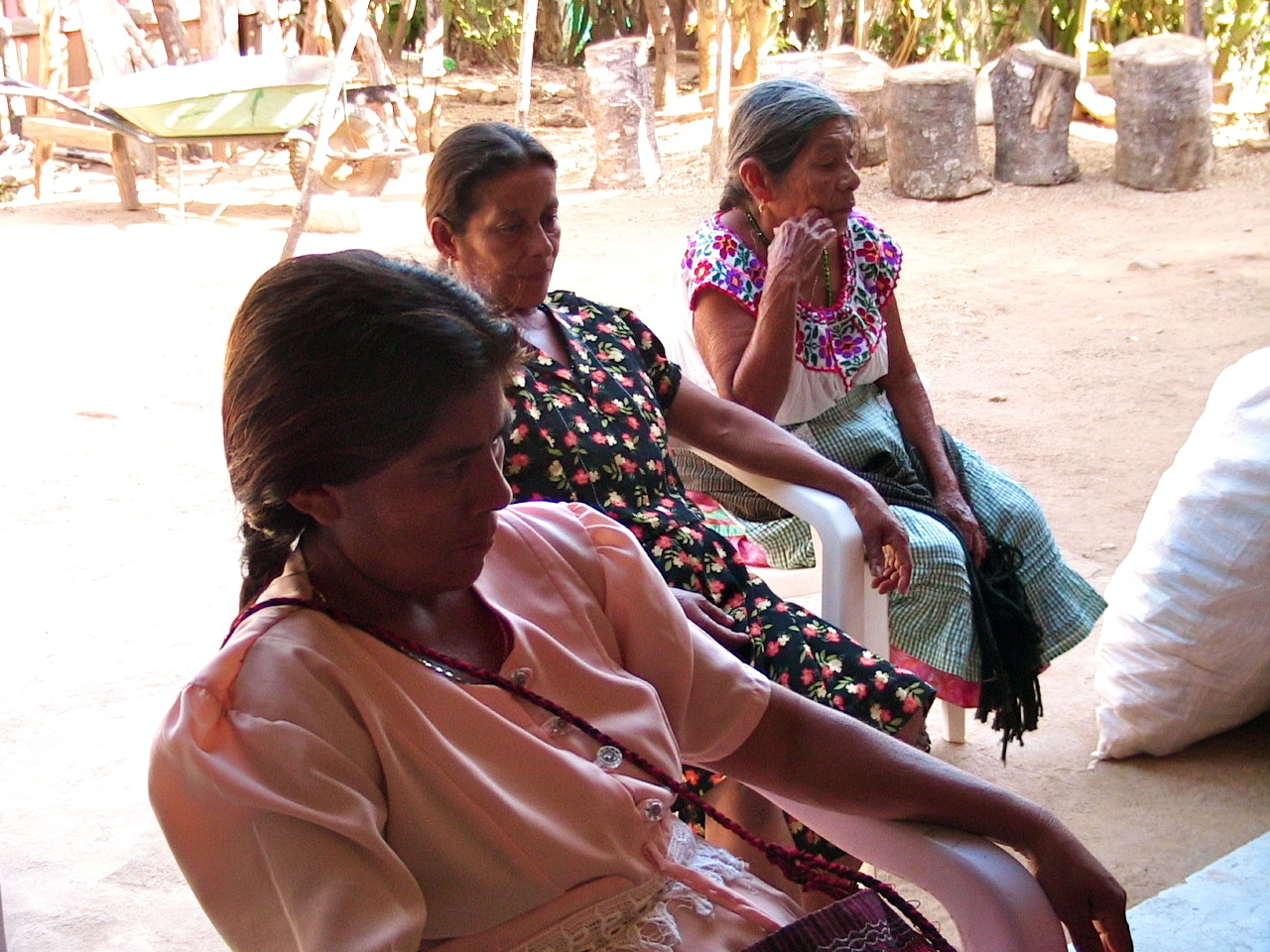
Women at a meeting in San Miguel Panixtlahuaca

== Population ==
As of 2005, the municipality had a total population of 5,724 of whom 4,903 spoke an indigenous language. Panixtlahuaca is one of the centers of the Chatino people, related to the Zapotec but with a distinct language. Agriculture includes the coffee crop, which is exported, and rainfed maize and beans for personal consumption or for the domestic market. 10% of the population is engaged in animal husbandry.

In September 2005 the local people were resisting pressure from state authorities to grant licenses for forestry and for sand and gravel extraction. In turn, the authorities accused the villagers of harboring armed rebel gangs and attempted to annul the elections of local officials. Further clashes with the authorities continued to occur in 2006, described as a period of terror by the local people. In April 2009, 15 trucks filled with armed federal troops surrounded the village of San Miguel Panixtlahuaca and erected road blocks to prevent anyone from entering or leaving, then combed the houses in search of weapons.
