= Chatino =

Chatino may refer to:

- Chatinos, an ethnic group of Mexico
- Chatino languages, a group of languages of Mexico
