= Tataltepec =

Tataltepec may refer to:

- Tataltepec de Valdés, Oaxaca
- Santa María Tataltepec, Oaxaca
- Tataltepec Chatino language
