= San Juan Lachao =

San Juan Lachao Tsoᴴ
- Municipality and town
- Location in Mexico
- Coordinates: 16°09′N 97°07′W
- Country: Mexico
- State: Oaxaca

Area
  - Total: 190.1 km^{2} (73.4 sq mi)

Population (2005)
  - Total: 3,936
- Time zone: UTC-6 (Central Standard Time)

San Juan Lachao (Highland Chatino: Tsoᴴ) is a town and municipality in Oaxaca in south-western Mexico. It is part of the Juquila District in the center of the Costa Region.

== Geography ==
The municipality covers 190.1 km^{2} of hilly land. The town is at an elevation of 60 meters above sea level. The climate is mild and humid. Local flowers include cartucho, gladiolus, marigold, bougainvillea, roses and geraniums. The area is well-wooded, with pine, oak, avocado, macuil, cedar, and guanacaxtle cuachepil. Mangoes, plums, bananas, oranges, limes and avocados provide fruit. Local birds include chachalaca, white-winged dove, pigeon blue, red Palamo, real peak, quail, magpie, woodpecker and parakeet. Wild boar, deer, badger, raccoon, squirrel, body spin, opossums, skunks and foxes are found in the forests, and iguana and rattlesnake are also present.

== Population ==
As of 2005, the municipality had 739 households with a total population of 3,936 of whom 1,825 spoke an indigenous language. Some of the people speak the Chatino language, a remote branch of the Zapotecan family spoken only in the Juquila district.

== Economy ==
The majority of the population is engaged in growing corn and beans. The Union of Indigenous Communities of the Isthmus Region, a cooperative founded in 1982, assists in production and distribution of the local products under a fair trade or organic label.
