= Tututepec =

Mesoamerican archaeological site in Oaxaca

Coordinates: 16°07′N 97°36′W

Tututepec (Mixtec: Yucu Dzaa) is a Mesoamerican archaeological site. It is located in the lower Río Verde valley on the coast of Oaxaca. The city was the capital of a tributary Mixtec empire during the Late Postclassic period (ca. 12th to early 16th centuries). At its largest extent the site covered some 21.85 km^{2}, and its political influence extended over an area of more than 25,000 km^{2} of the neighbouring territory covering many towns and cultures.

Today, the site is occupied by the contemporary settlement of Villa de Tututepec de Melchor Ocampo, in the Mexican state of Oaxaca.

== Etymology ==
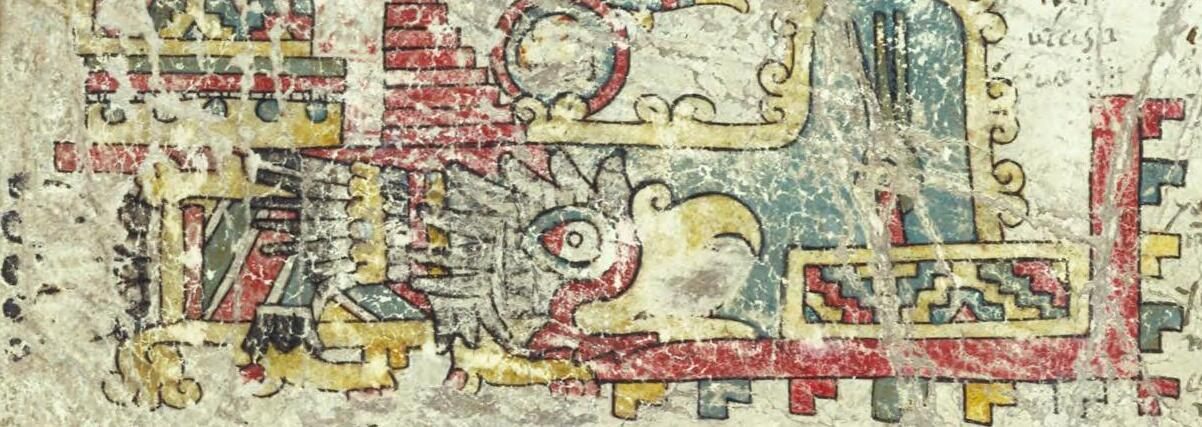
Glyph of Tututepec from page 5 of Codex Colombino, the glyph depicts a bird on a hill.

Tututepec is a Nahuatl name meaning "Bird Hill," while in Mixtec the city is called Yucu Dzaa meaning "Hill of the Bird." In Aztec and Mixtec scripts, the city's glyph is drawn differently but both scripts represent the city with a bird on a hill, untying the name of the city to a specific sound but to a specific name.

== Sources ==
There are 3 main sources for the history of Tututepec, the first are Mixtec codices notably Codex Bodley, Nuttall, and Colombino-Becker that record the founding of the city by Eight Deer as well as their first conquests in the late 11th century. Tututepec drops from the historical record after Eight Deer moved to Tilantongo as his new capital, it isn't until early colonial times when the Relaciones geográficas was created where information on Tututepec on the eve of Spanish conquest is available. Tututepec's Relación has been lost but their subject communities' Relaciones remain documenting Tututepec's expansionist ambitions and relations to their subjects. Lastly Arthur Joyce led archaeological investigations of the city published in 2004 documenting the size, architecture, growth, and surface artifacts of the site.

In addition to the main sources of history there is little information to be gleaned from other sources, oral history recorded in 1961 by Gutierre Tibón provides information on the pre-Columbian palace of Tututepec and connections to Central Mexico. Francisco Burgoa records of a neutral marketplace in Putla that Tututepec operated in outside of their borders. A linguistic study by Katheryn Josserand suggests that the coastal dialect of Mixtec diverged from the highland dialect by the 11th century supporting the theory of a Mixtec migration to the coast during that period. The Tututepec Archaeological Project led by Marc Levine in 2005 excavated 3 commoner residences in Tututepec providing much information on the economy of the city.

== History ==
=== Eight Deer's migration and reign ===
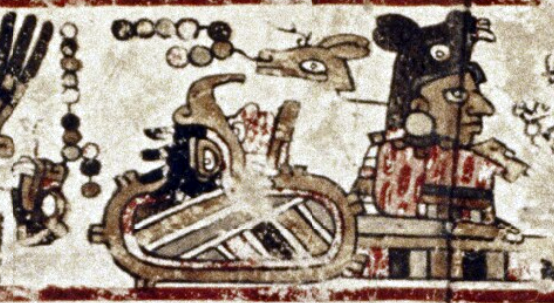
Eight Deer during one of his early campaigns as ruler of Tututepec from Codex Bodley.

The first settlements in Tututepec dates back to 400 BCE, afterwards the population of the area would fluctuate until 800 CE where the site would be almost devoid of activity. Prior to Eight Deer's journey to the coast, there was little evidence of a Mixtec presence in the region. The idea of a migration led by Eight Deer to the coast is supported by linguistic evidence of the highland and coastal dialects diverging around 900-1000 CE and little cultural similarity between the highland Mixteca Alta and the coast outside of ceramics prior to Tututepec's founding.

The founding of Tututepec is recorded in 3 Mixtec codices that vary slightly, Codex Bodley, Nuttall, and Colombino-Becker. Eight Deer after meeting with oracle Nine Grass at Chalcatongo migrates to the coast with a group of Mixtecs and founds Tututepec in 1083. The foundation activity done by Eight Deer to establish the city varies between codices, in Codex Bodley he meets with the Chatino rulers of Juquila to gain their recognition, in Codex Nuttall he performs a ballcourt ceremony, lastly in Codex Colombino-Becker he performs a ballcourt ceremony in addition to bringing sacred objects to the new site. After founding Tututepec, Eight Deer begins wars of consolidation as he conquers dozens of towns establishing Tututepec power in a fragmented region as the collapse of the Rio Viejo state prior to his arrival left the region fragmented and easier to conquer, the result of the conquests allowed the Mixtecs to gain access to new resources from tribute such as cacao and feathers.

In 1097 a Toltec delegation led by their leader Four Jaguar visited Tututepec and allied with Eight Deer, aiding him in conquering Tilantongo the next year. After Eight Deer conquered Tilantongo he never returned to Tututepec leaving the history of the city unknown until the eve of Spanish conquest.

Archaeology reveals that over time the people in Tututepec moved to higher elevations contrasting to the Mixteca Alta where people tended to live in the lowlands. The Tututepec population also moved east of the Río Verde possibly to serve as a barrier to enemies in the west and allow more land to be used for cultivation to feed the growing population.

=== Maximum extent and Spanish conquest ===
By the time of Spanish contact Tututepec had conquered many towns near the coast including Suchixtepec, Huamelula, Huatulco, Juchatengo, Jamiltepec, and Juquila. Once conquered, these towns were expected to provide the capital with tribute, slaves and soldiers. Tututepec allowed local rulers remain in power after conquering them but would leave governors from the capital to ensure control. The imperial program of Tututepec allowed the rulers to access many resources from tribute in order to trade them with other states. It is not unlikely that Tututepec's sphere of influence reached as far north as Santa María Zacatepec and as far west as Cahuitan, on the Pacific coast very near the modern border with Guerrero.

Tututepec's relationship with the Aztec empire is not well known, Tututepec expansion northward was halted by Aztec expansion into Oaxaca but no records of direct interactions remain. After the Aztecs captured the obsidian mines of Pachuca, Tututepec, which used the material extensively, began relying on these mines less for their obsidian needs, suggesting unwillingness to directly trade with the rival empire. While they never explicitly warred with the Aztecs it is known they have had proxy wars as the Aztecs would aid communities on Tututepec's border like Coatlan in defense while Tututepec sent soldiers to Yanhuitlan to aid in their defense against the Aztecs. Around this time it is also speculated that the leader of Tututepec commissioned the codex Colombino to honor Eight Deer.

After the Spanish conquest of the Aztec Empire Hernan Cortes sent his lieutenant Pedro de Alvarado to the coast where they were aided by Zapotecs from Tehuantepec in January 1522, arriving in Tututepec in February being taken to the core of the city before conquering it by March 4 after capturing their ruler Coaxintecuhtli and extorting 30,000 peso's worth of gold eventually leaving him to die in captivity.

=== Archaeological investigations ===
In 1956 Gabriel DeCicco and Donald Brockington published a survey of a site called Cerro de los Pájaros an hour south of the modern Tututepec town where they noted informants described gold objects being found in the site, which led to Ronald Spores suggest the site being historical Tututepec in 1983. Scott O'Mack's surface reconnaissance in 1990 failed to find Cerro de los Pájaros and concluded that the modern town of Villa de Tututepec de Melchor Ocampo was historical Tututepec. Full coverage surveys of the lower Rio Verde Valley since 1994 led by Joyce have resulted in extensive archaeological data that corroborates with the Mixtec codices on the founding of the city. Commoner household excavations were conducted in 2005 led by Levine reveal that commoners were able to obtain luxury goods without elite interference on distribution.

== Site description ==
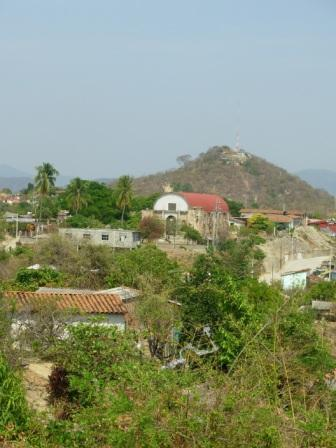
The Church in present-day Tututepec, formerly home to the palace in pre-Columbian times.

The site being 2185 hectares big is large by Postclassic Mesoamerican standards being bigger than all other Oaxacan sites and even bigger than Tenochtitlan which was 1250 hectares big. Although bigger than Tenochtitlan the population density of Tututepec is much lower, the population estimate of the city being 10,925-21,850, estimated from sherd densities.

There are 6 areas with monumental architecture in Tututepec: the Church Platform, Cerro de los Pájaros, La Maquina, North Patio, Southern Platform and a ballcourt at San Francisco de Arriba which may have been the ballcourt used by Eight Deer. The Church Platform was the ceremonial core of Tututepec, notably containing 8 carved monuments of stone most of which were associated with the ruler's palace. One of these monuments, monument 6 bears a resemblance to the Atlantean figures of Tula reinforcing Eight Deer's connection to the Toltecs. The monument is theorized to depict the Central Mexican goddess Itzapapalotl because the statue features a stiff pose, a mirror on the back, and a triangular cape called quechquemitl which are all features of the goddess. After conquest the platform was converted from the palace of the ruler to a church incorporating pre-Columbian art styles like disc friezes set on the walls.

== Economy ==
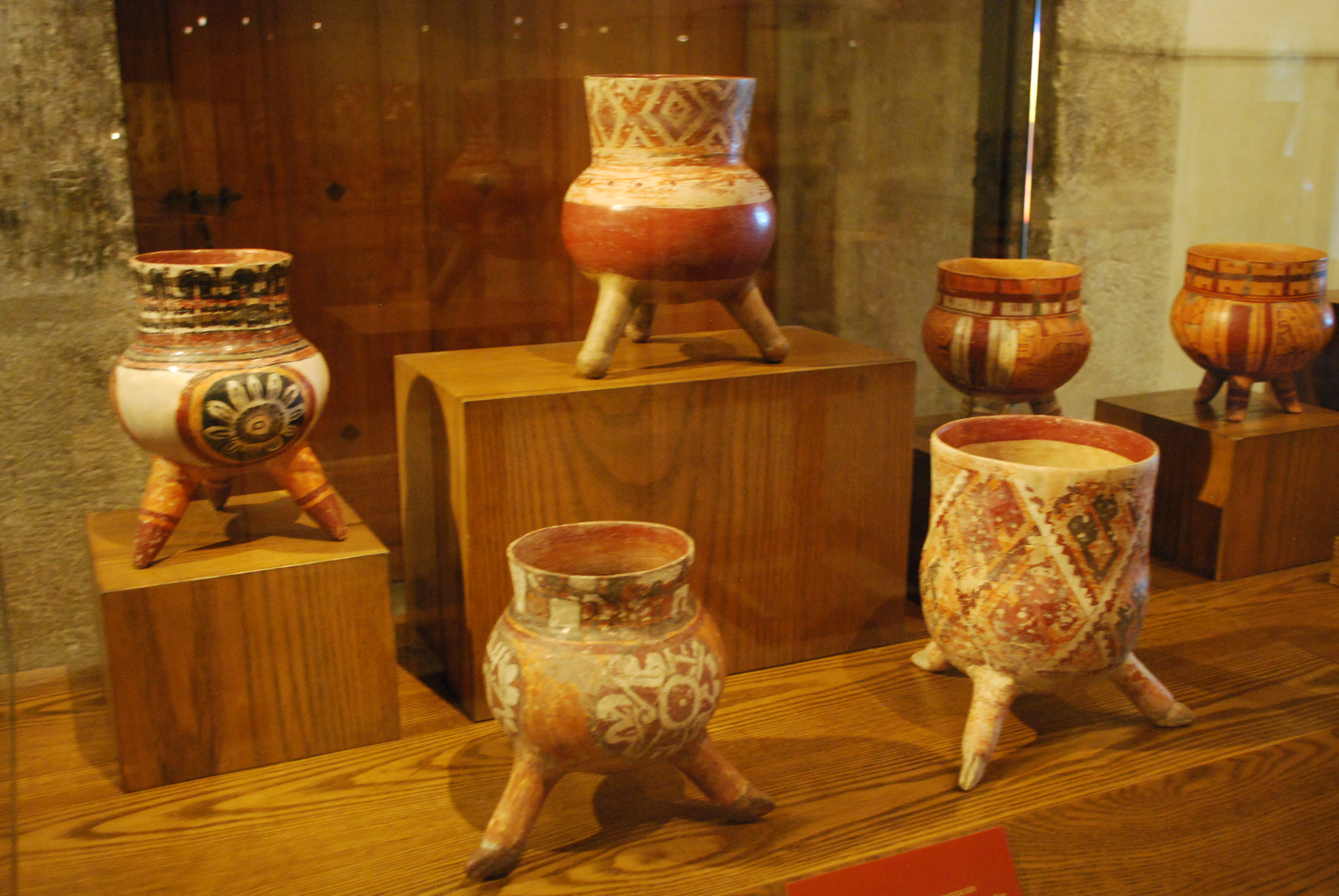
Tututepec commoners had access to polychrome ceramics without restrictions from rulers.

Tututepec was a tributary empire, conquering many places and requiring subject towns to regularly deliver tribute to the capital. The first campaigns of Tututepec led by Eight Deer resulted in a couple towns submitting rather than resisting the lord, these towns are shown in Codex Nutall, Town of the Head offered jaguar pelts as tribute while Town of the Dove offered feathers and cacao. Access to these resources made Tututepec a desired trading partner evidenced by highland-coastal trade found in archaeology. It is hypothesized that Eight Deer's conquests and access to these resources were part of the reason the Toltecs approached him for an alliance. Tututepec would also delegate tribute collectors in their conquered towns to ensure the flow of goods to the capital. For subjects further into the highlands, they were expected to bring their tribute to the marketplace in Putla which was a neutral town which allowed the coast to trade with the highlands without tension.

Spindle whorls found in excavated residences at Tututepec and early colonial sources indicate that the city was a cotton exporter. The cotton would be traded to highland states for obsidian which made more effective tools than local chert. Many trade goods had found in commoner residences in the city were not made locally indicating that commoners were able to participate in not only the local economy but also long distance economies. Commoners in Tututepec also had more access to polychrome ceramics compared to other Mixtecs in the highlands, these ceramics commonly had eagle and smoke volute motifs representing war and sacrifice suggesting that Tututepec commoners supported the government's expansionist ideology. Ceramic molds were recently discovered in Tututepec which were used to create internal clay cores for lost-wax casting confirming Tututepec as a center of metallurgy in pre-Columbian Mesoamerica.
