= Santa María Temaxcaltepec =

Santa María Temaxcaltepec Xyanᴬ
- Municipality and town
- Location in Mexico
- Coordinates: 16°10′N 97°12′W
- Country: Mexico
- State: Oaxaca

Area
  - Total: 86.8 km^{2} (33.5 sq mi)
- Elevation: 1,320 m (4,330 ft)

Population (2005)
  - Total: 2,628
- Time zone: UTC-6 (Central Standard Time)

Santa María Temaxcaltepec (Highland Chatino: Xyanᴬ) is a town and municipality in Oaxaca in south-western Mexico. It is part of the Juquila District in the center of the Costa Region.

== Name ==
The name "Temaxcaltepec" means "hill of baths" in Nahuatl, a reference to the use of steam baths or sweat lodges to cure the sick. In the native Highland Chatino, the town is known as Xyanᴬ.

== Geography ==
The municipality covers an area of 86.8 km^{2} at an elevation of 1,320 above sea level. The terrain is rugged, in the foothills of the Sierra Madre del Sur. Rainfall of 2,057 mm occurs mostly between June and October.

=== Flora and fauna ===
Flora include amate, fig, locust, avocado, mahogany, oak, cedar, palm, hormiguillo and pastures. Wildlife includes squirrels, armadillos, opossum, fox and badger.

== Demography ==
As of 2005, the municipality had 505 households with a total population of 2,628 of whom 2,081 spoke an indigenous language. Agriculture is the main economic activity. Temaxcaltepec is one of the centers of the Chatino people, related to the Zapotec but with a distinct language. Municipal representatives are selected according to the traditional indigenous system (usos y costumbres). In December 2007 there were disturbances when the state electoral authority failed to recognize the leaders who had been selected in this way.
