= Santiago Yaitepec =

Santiago Yaitepec Keᴳ Xinᴱ
- Municipality and town
- Location in Mexico
- Coordinates: 16°13′N 97°16′W
- Country: Mexico
- State: Oaxaca

Area
  - Total: 53.58 km^{2} (20.69 sq mi)
- Elevation: 1,840 m (6,040 ft)

Population (2005)
  - Total: 3,665
- Time zone: UTC-6 (Central Standard Time)

Santiago Yaitepec (Highland Chatino: Keᴳ Xinᴱ) is a town and municipality in Oaxaca in southern Mexico, two kilometers southeast of Santa Catarina Juquila. It is part of the Juquila District in the center of the Costa Region. The name "Yaitepec" means "Three hills".

== Geography ==
The municipality covers an area of 53.58 km^{2} at an altitude of 1,840 meters above sea level. The terrain is hilly, in the foothills of the Sierra Madre del Sur. The climate is temperate and humid, with an average temperature of 17.9 °C and annual rainfall of 1,347.6 mm. Trees include pine, fir, pine, madrone, moral, oak, and alder. Wild fauna include opossum, skunk, armadillo, rabbit, snake and deer.

== Demography ==
As of 2005, the municipality had 623 households with a total population of 3,665 of whom 3,137 spoke an indigenous language. 90% of economic activity is related to agriculture, with coffee being the cash crop. Yaitepec is one of the centers of the Chatino people, related to the Zapotec but with a distinct language. The municipality selects its authorities under the Uses and Customs system, which lets indigenous communities conserve their traditional political structure.

Although infrastructure is modern, the Chatino community has maintained its traditional culture. Most of the women wear traditional dress, including colorful skirts and the richly embroidered blouses with unique local designs of bright flowers and animals. The clothes are hand-woven using back strap looms and hand embroidered. The town is "dry": no alcohol is sold.
