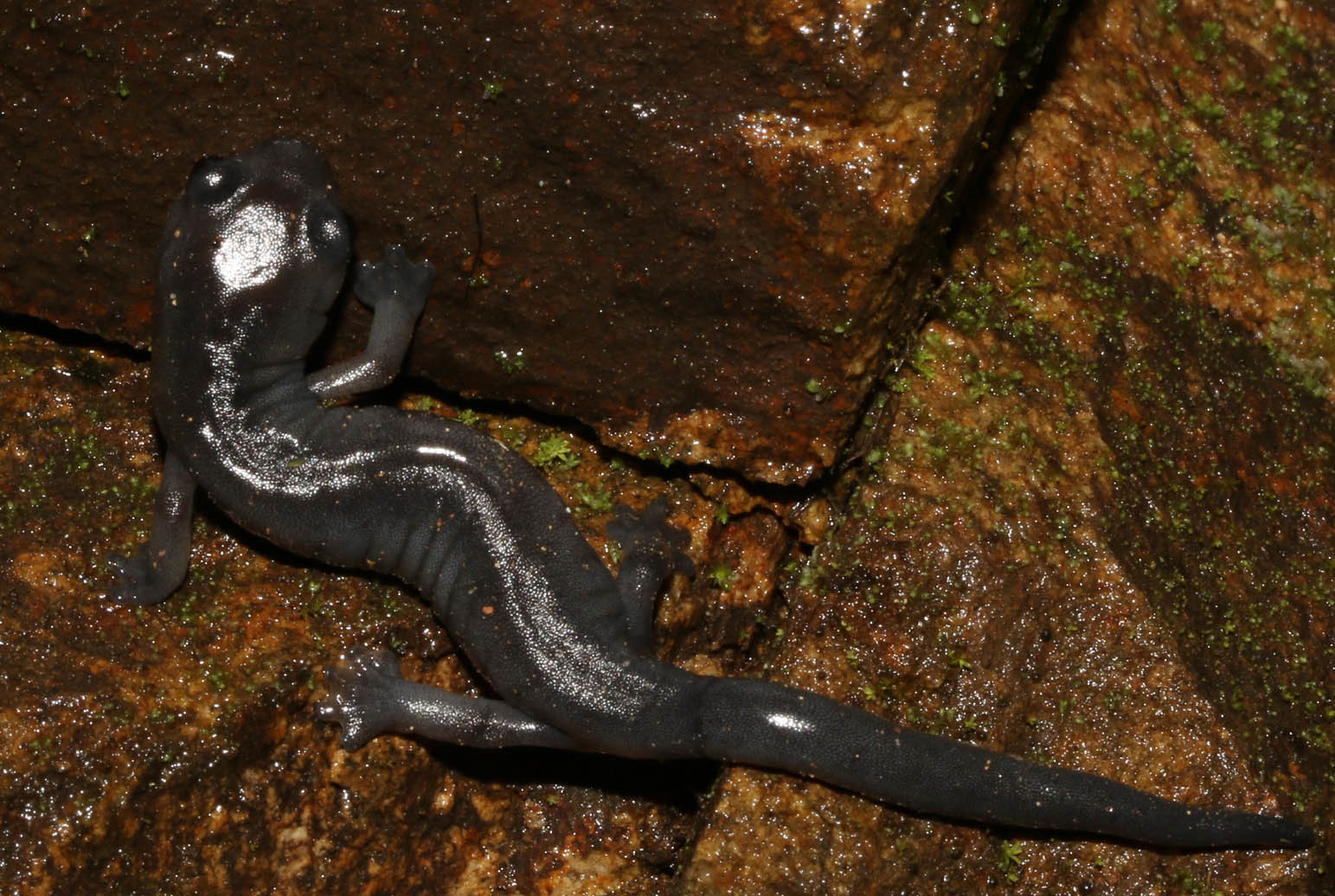
- Bolitoglossa macrinii in Oaxaca, Mexico

Conservation status
- Endangered (IUCN 3.1)

Scientific classification
- Kingdom: Animalia
- Phylum: Chordata
- Class: Amphibia
- Order: Urodela
- Family: Plethodontidae
- Genus: Bolitoglossa
- Species: B. macrinii

Binomial name
- Bolitoglossa macrinii (Lafrentz, 1930)

Synonyms
- Oedipus macrinii Lafrentz, 1930

= Oaxacan climbing salamander =

Species of amphibian

The Oaxacan climbing salamander (Bolitoglossa macrinii), also known commonly as the Oaxacan mushroom tongue salamander, is a species of salamander in the family Plethodontidae (lungless salamanders). The species is endemic to Mexico.

== Etymology ==
The specific name, macrinii, is in honor of Emil Macrinius who was a collector of natural history specimens in Mexico.

== Habitat ==
The natural habitat of Bolitoglossa macrinii is subtropical or tropical moist montane forests, but it has also been found in plantations.

== Geographic range ==
This species, Bolitoglossa macrinii, lives along the Pacific slope of the Sierra Madre del Sur in Oaxaca, in and around San Miguel Suchixtepec and San Gabriel Mixtepec, and between San Gabriel Mixtepec and Pochutla. It is most often found at elevations of 550–1,860 m (1,800–6,100 ft), and occasionally up to 2,500 m (8,200 ft) elevation. Its extent of occurrence (EOO) is 4,756 km^{2} (1,836 mi^{2}), its area of occupancy (AOO) is 4,345 km^{2} (1,678 mi^{2}).

== Conservation status ==
Bolitoglossa macrinii is threatened by habitat loss.
