= CLY =

CLY or cly may refer to:

- Calvi – Sainte-Catherine Airport, Corsica, France (IATA code:CLY)
- Chinley railway station, Derbyshire, England (CRS code:CLY)
- Eastern Highland Chatino language, spoken in Oaxaca, Mexico (ISO 639-3:cly)
- Lyocell, fabric code CLY
