= Santa Catarina Juquila =

Santa Catarina Juquila Sqweᶠ ?
- Municipality and town
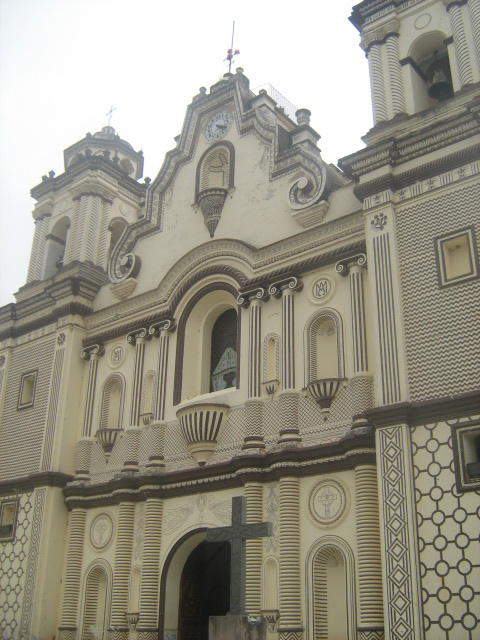
- Iglesia de Santa Catarina Juquila

- Location in Mexico
- Coordinates: 16°14′N 97°18′W
- Country: Mexico
- State: Oaxaca

Population (2020)
  - Total: 18,654
  - Seat: 8,084
- Time zone: UTC-6 (Central Standard Time)

Santa Catarina Juquila (San Juan Quiahije Chatino: Sqweᶠ) is a town in the State of Oaxaca, Mexico, and is the seat of the municipality also called Santa Catarina Juquila. It is part of the Juquila District in the center of the Costa Region. The name "Juquila" comes from "Xuhquililla", which means "Place of blue milkweed".. In Tataltepec Chatino, it is known as Scuꞌbe.

== Geography ==
The total area of the municipality is 811.42 km^{2} in rugged terrain in the foothills of the Sierra Madre del Sur. The climate is temperate humid, with maximum temperatures of 20 °C, minimum 12 °C and average 16 °C.. Annual rainfall is 854 mm, higher from May to September and lower from October to April. Trees include pine, oak, mahogany, cedar, oak, coral, topehuaje, blackwood, ebony, jacaranda and ash. Fruit trees include orange, lemon, mamey, banana, pomegranate and guava. Wild fauna are deer, badgers, iguana and armadillo.

== Town ==
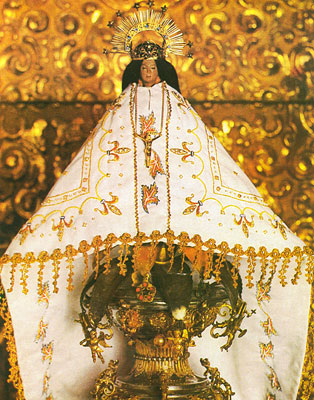
Virgen de Juquila

The town has a population of 5,579 inhabitants and is at an altitude of 1,462 meters above sea level. It is located north of Puerto Escondido on Federal Highway 131.

The town is known for the Santuario (Sanctuary) de Juquila which houses a 30 cm statue of the Virgen de Juquila, which has been venerated since the 16th century. In 1633, it survived, completely intact, a fire that destroyed the village in which it was originally located. At the beginning of the 18th century, it was moved to its current location where the sanctuary was built for it. Thousands visit this Virgin from across the state of Oaxaca, other parts of Mexico and abroad .

== Population ==
In 2005 the municipality had 2,715 households with a total of 14,380 inhabitants of whom 4,168 people who speak an indigenous language. Juquila is one of the centers of the Chatino people, related to the Zapotec but with a distinct language. The Union of Indigenous Communities of the Isthmus Region, a cooperative founded in 1982, assists in production and distribution of the local products, notably coffee, under a fair trade label.

== Communities ==
As municipal seat, Santa Catarina Juquila has governing jurisdiction over the following communities:

- Ampliación Barrio Grande y la Asunción
- Arroyo Triste
- Arroyo Trompo,
- Cañada de Otate,
- Cerro Iglesia,
- Cinco Negritos,
- Cruz de Palo,
- El Borrego,
- El Cacao,
- El Camalote,
- El Cangrejo,
- El Carrizo,
- El Cereso,
- El Ciruelo,
- El Coquito,
- El Corozal Grande,
- El Corozalito,
- El Destino,
- El Mamey,
- El Mosquito,
- El Nanche,
- El Obispo,
- El Ocote Solo,
- El Otate,
- El Pedimento,
- El Platanar,
- El Portillo,
- El Portillo Amialtepec,
- El Salar,
- Finca Manuel León,
- Junta de los Ríos,
- La Asunción,
- La Cieneguilla,
- La Esmeralda,
- La Esperanza,
- La Guadalupe,
- La Jícara,
- La Juquilita,
- La Matraca (Llano de los Ocotes),
- La Sanguijuela,
- La Soledad,
- La Soledad el Mapache,
- La Unión,
- La Yerba Buena,
- Las Trancas,
- Llano Grande,
- Loma Bonita,
- Los Tres Reyes las Canoas,
- Mata Sandía
- Monte Obscuro,
- Paso Hondo,
- Pie del Cerro,
- Plan del Ciruelo,
- Pueblo Viejo,
- Río Bajo (La Reforma),
- San Felipe de Jesús,
- San Francisco Ixpantepec,
- San José Ixtápam,
- San José Vista Hermosa (Aguacatal Grande),
- San Lucas,
- San Marcos Zacatepec,
- Santa María Amialtepec,
- Santa María Yolotepec,
- Santiago Miramar,
- Vista al Mar (Agua Podrida)
