= Laguna de Manialtepec =

Coastal lagoon in Oaxaca, Mexico

Coordinates: 15°56′45″N 97°11′40″W

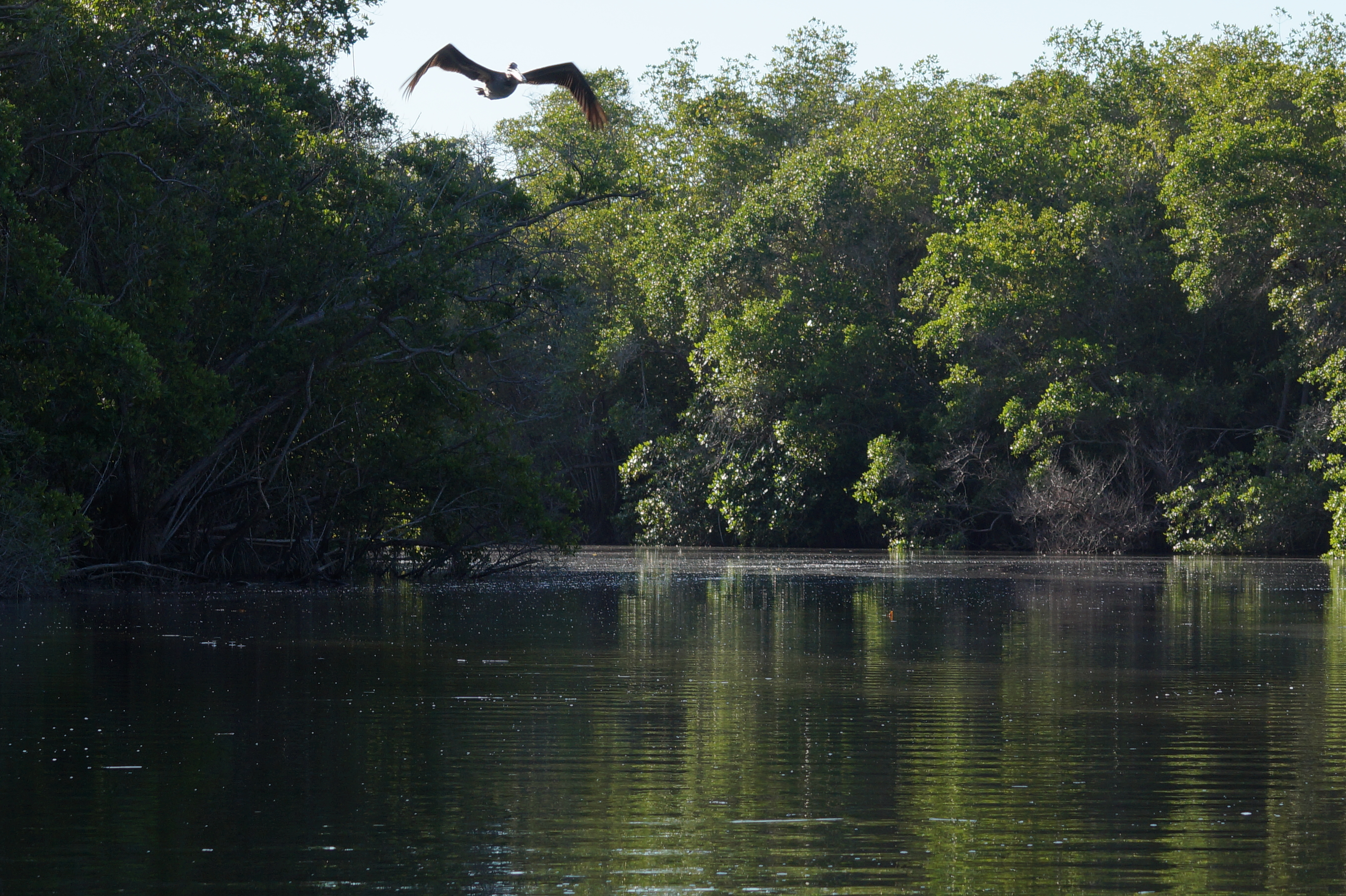

The Laguna de Manialtepec is a coastal lagoon about 18 km west of Puerto Escondido in the State of Oaxaca, Mexico. The name, from Náhuatl manial ('spring') and tepec ('hill'), means 'hill where water is born'. Access to the lagoon by car is via Federal Highway 200 or by boat from Puerto Escondido. The lagoon is 15 km long with patches of leafy jungle and mangroves that reach 15 meters of height in some places . The lagoon opens to the sea during the rainy season at a place known as Puerto Suelo or El Carnero.

While much of the foliage and wildlife is visible from the docks in San José Manialtepec and the restaurants on them, most people explore the lagoon by boat or kayak to get up close to the wildlife on the banks. Multiple species of birds nest here, including wild ducks, storks and “tijerillas”. Fish species to be found include mojarra, sea bass, catfish and striped mullet.

About four times a year, more or less, the lagoon becomes phosphorescent due to a type an algae that lives in the lagoon. The organism's luminescence is activated by the movement of the water. At night, streaks of light can be seen due to the movement of fish (and humans) in the water.

== See also ==
- Lagunas de Chacahua National Park
