= Tataltepec de Valdés =

Tataltepec de Valdés Jloꞌo
- Municipality and town
- Location in Mexico Tataltepec de Valdés (Mexico)
- Coordinates: 16°18′N 97°33′W
- Country: Mexico
- State: Oaxaca

Area
  - Total: 369.99 km^{2} (142.85 sq mi)
- Elevation: 370 m (1,210 ft)

Population (2005)
  - Total: 5,377
- Time zone: UTC-6 (Central Standard Time)

Tataltepec de Valdés (Tataltepec Chatino: Jloꞌo) is a town and municipality in Oaxaca in south-western Mexico. It is part of the Juquila District in the center of the Costa Region. The town was established around 400-300 BC. The name "Tataltepec" means "Grandfather hill". Antonio Valdés, born in the town, was an early leader of the independence movement in Oaxaca who died on 19 November 1811.

== Geography ==
The municipality covers an area of 369.99 km^{2} at an altitude of 370 meters above sea level, lying in the coastal region between the Sierra Madre del Sur and the Pacific ocean. The climate is Coastal subhumid, with an average temperature of 18.9°C and annual rainfall of 1.409 mm.

=== Flora and fauna ===
Flora include pine, oak, cedar, berries, bougainvillea and roses. Fauna include mountain lions, ocelots, deer, badgers, raccoons, iguanas, toucans, armadillos, coyotes, foxes, opossums, pheasants, chachalacas, buzzards, herons, hawks, eagles, pigeons, snakes, rabbits, wild boar, squirrels, parrots, parakeets, parrots, macaws, owls, swallows, mockingbirds, orioles, grackles, fish, and shrimp.

== Demography ==
As of 2005, the municipality had 1,068 households with a total population of 5,377 of whom 2,842 spoke an indigenous language. Most of the people are engaged in agriculture, with some logging. Tataltepec de Valdés is one of the centers of the Chatino people, related to the Zapotec but with a distinct language.
