= Teojomulco Chatino =

Extinct Oto-Manguean language of Mexico

- Native to: Mexico
- Region: Oaxaca
- Extinct: early 20th century
- Language family: Oto-Manguean: Zapotecan; Chatino; Teojomulco Chatino

Language codes
- ISO 639-3: None (mis)
- Glottolog: teoj1234

Teojomulco Chatino is an extinct Oto-Manguean language, the most divergent of the Chatino languages, formerly spoken in the town of Teojomulco. Belmar (1902) has the only extant data on the language, a wordlist of 228 words and phrases. It is possible that the speakers who supplied the wordlist were the last speakers of the language, since there were no speakers left by the middle of the 20th century.

== Phonology ==
The following phonemes are based on reconstructions from available data and comparisons with related languages.

=== Vowels ===
Current reconstructions of Teojomulco Chatino show it had 5 vowels: /a, e, i, o, u/.

=== Consonants ===
Reconstructions show that Teojomulco Chatino had 15 consonants.

	Bilabial	Alveolar		Palato-alveolar	Palatal	Velar		Glottal
	Bilabial	plain	palatalized	Palato-alveolar	Palatal	plain	labialized	Glottal
Stop	p	t				k	kʷ	ʔ
Affricate				t͡ʃ				
Fricative		s		ʃ				h
Nasal	m	n	nʲ					
Approximant		l			j		w	

Teojomulco Chatino has 7 allophones. /t͡s/ is a post-tonic allophone of /s/, and /kʲ/ is an allophone of /k/ in palatalized environments. /gʲ/ occurs in environments that trigger both palatalization and voicing.
