= San Pedro Mixtepec, Juquila =

San Pedro Mixtepec
- Municipality and town
- Location of the municipality in Oaxaca

- Location in Mexico
- Coordinates: 16°0′0″N 97°7′1″W
- Country: Mexico
- State: Oaxaca

Area
  - Total: 325.1 km^{2} (125.5 sq mi)
  - Town: 2.34 km^{2} (0.90 sq mi)
- Elevation: 220 m (720 ft)

Population (2020 census)
  - Total: 49,780
  - Density: 153.1/km^{2} (396.6/sq mi)
  - Town: 5,103
  - Town density: 2,180/km^{2} (5,650/sq mi)
- Time zone: UTC-6 (Central Standard Time)

San Pedro Mixtepec is a town and municipality in Oaxaca in south-western Mexico. It is part of the Juquila District in the center of the Costa Region.

A view of the town of Puerto Escondido

== Geography ==
The municipality covers an area of 325.1 km^{2} at an average altitude of 220 meters above sea level on the Pacific coast of Oaxaca. The climate is warm and humid. Flora is diverse, including tulips, roses, bougainvillea, cempaxóchitl, rose garden, lemon blossoms, noon platanillo, prickly pear, cedar, macuil, huanacaxtle, mahogany and palm Fruit trees include mango, banana, mamey sapote, sapodilla, coconut, lemon, rtamarindo, almond, orange and lemon lime.

== Population ==
As of 2005, the municipality had 7,881 households with a total population of 33,682 of whom 919 spoke an indigenous language. 40% of the population of the municipality is engaged in agriculture, and 20% in animal husbandry. Tourism employs 20% of the population in the port and tourist center of Puerto Escondido and the nearby Bajos de Chila.
