= San Pedro Juchatengo =

- Municipality and town
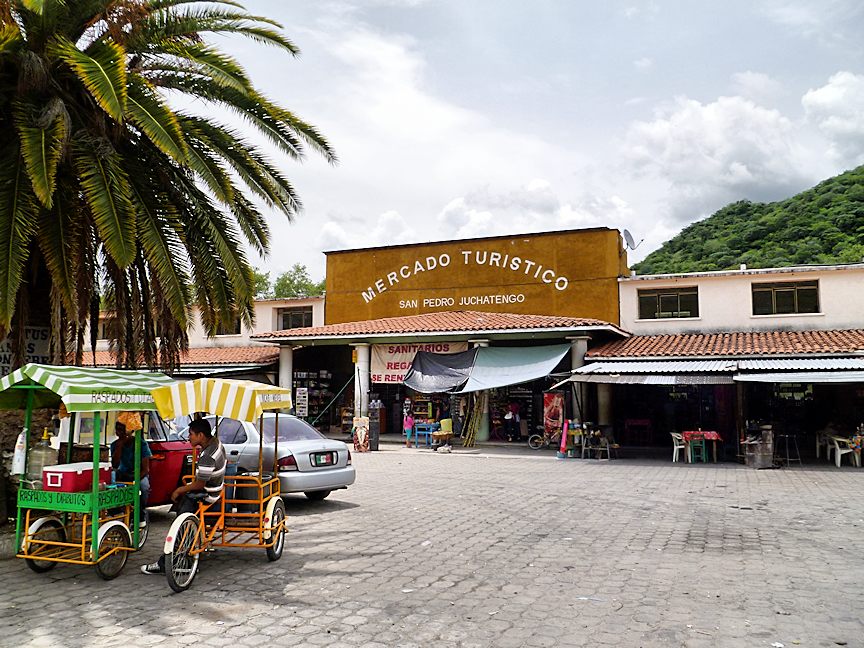
- Village Market & Tourist Centre

- Location in Mexico
- Coordinates: 16°20′35″N 97°5′15″W
- Country: Mexico
- State: Oaxaca
- District: Juquila District

Area
  - Total: 108.44 km^{2} (41.87 sq mi)
- Elevation: 860 m (2,820 ft)

Population (2005)
  - Total: 1,618
- Time zone: UTC-6 (Central Standard Time)

San Pedro Juchatengo is a town and municipality in Oaxaca in south-western Mexico. It is part of the Juquila District in the centre of the Costa Region. The name comes from "Xochiatengo", which means "Flowers on the waters edge".

== Geography ==
The municipality covers an area of 108.44 km^{2} at an altitude of 860 metres above sea level. Terrain is mountainous, part of the Sierra Madre del Sur. The climate is temperate subhumid, with an average temperature of 16.4°C and annual rainfall of 847.0 mm. Flora include laurel, bougainvillea and roses.

== Population ==
As of 2005, the municipality had 360 households with a total population of 1,618 of whom 8 spoke an indigenous language. The main economic activity is agriculture. The local people fish in the Balsas River, which is locally known as the Atoyac river, which runs past the town, to supplement their diet.
