= Villa de Tututepec de Melchor Ocampo =

- Municipality and town
- Location in Mexico
- Coordinates: 16°08′N 97°36′W
- Country: Mexico
- State: Oaxaca

Area
  - Total: 1,249 km^{2} (482 sq mi)
- Elevation: 280 m (920 ft)

Population (2005)
  - Total: 40,767
- Time zone: UTC-6 (Central Standard Time)

Villa de Tututepec de Melchor Ocampo is a town and municipality in Oaxaca in south-western Mexico.

== History ==
Before the arrival of Spanish, the area was occupied by a small Mixtec kingdom, established in 357 AD, when Prince Mazatzin arrived from Tilantongo. Upon climbing a mountain full of seabirds, Prince Mazatzin decided to found his capital in this beautiful location, calling it “Yucu – Saa”, or "Bird mountain" in the Mixtec language.

Tututepec served as a Mixtec capital under Eight Deer Jaguar Claw, maintaining its independence despite coming under attack from the Aztecs between 1483–1519.

When the conquistador Pedro de Alvarado arrived March 3, 1522, he defeated Tututepec's warriors, who fought under Cuaxintecutli (Venerable Lord Serpent). Cuaxintecutli died from torture on March 22, 1522. In April 1522, Hernán Cortés moved the Villa de la Segura de la Frontera to Tututepec, and installed Gutierre de Badajoz as the first mayor.

== Geography ==
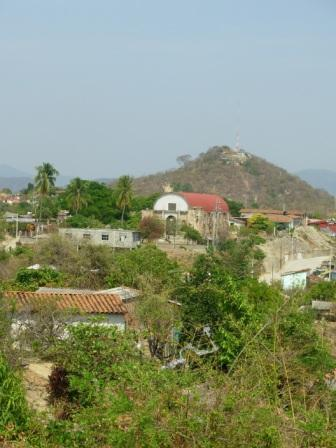
The church in Tututepec, with Mount Yuku Saa in the background

Tututepec is part of the Juquila District in the center of the Costa Region. The name "Tututepec" means "Bird Mountain".

The municipality covers an area of 1,249 km^{2} at an average altitude of 280 m above sea level, lying on the Pacific coast of Oaxaca. The municipality includes the large Lagunas de Chacahua National Park and the archaeological site of Villa Segura Tututepec. The climate is hot and humid.

=== Flora and fauna ===
Flora include palmera, cotton, coffee, citrus, melons, bananas, lemon, hibiscus. Fauna include iguanas, deer, snakes and lakes with abundant fish.

== Demographics ==
As of 2005, the municipality had 9,397 households with a total population of 40,767 of which 2,144 spoke an indigenous language, Tututepec Mixtec. 90% of the population is engaged in cultivation of fruits such as watermelon, cantaloupe, papaya, hibiscus, and banana. Many of the people also engage in small-scale animal husbandry, and some make pots, jars, beads and blouses.

== Culture ==
Champurrado, a traditional chocolate-based atole drink, is considered a symbol of Mixtec culture. It was served at a ceremony commemorating the 1656th anniversary of the municipality, with a blessing of food, thanks to mother earth, and a traditional mass of thanksgiving. A caravan of bicyclists and other guests of honor inaugurated the opening of an exposition of artisan handicrafts and local cuisine, along with a book fair.

== Gallery ==
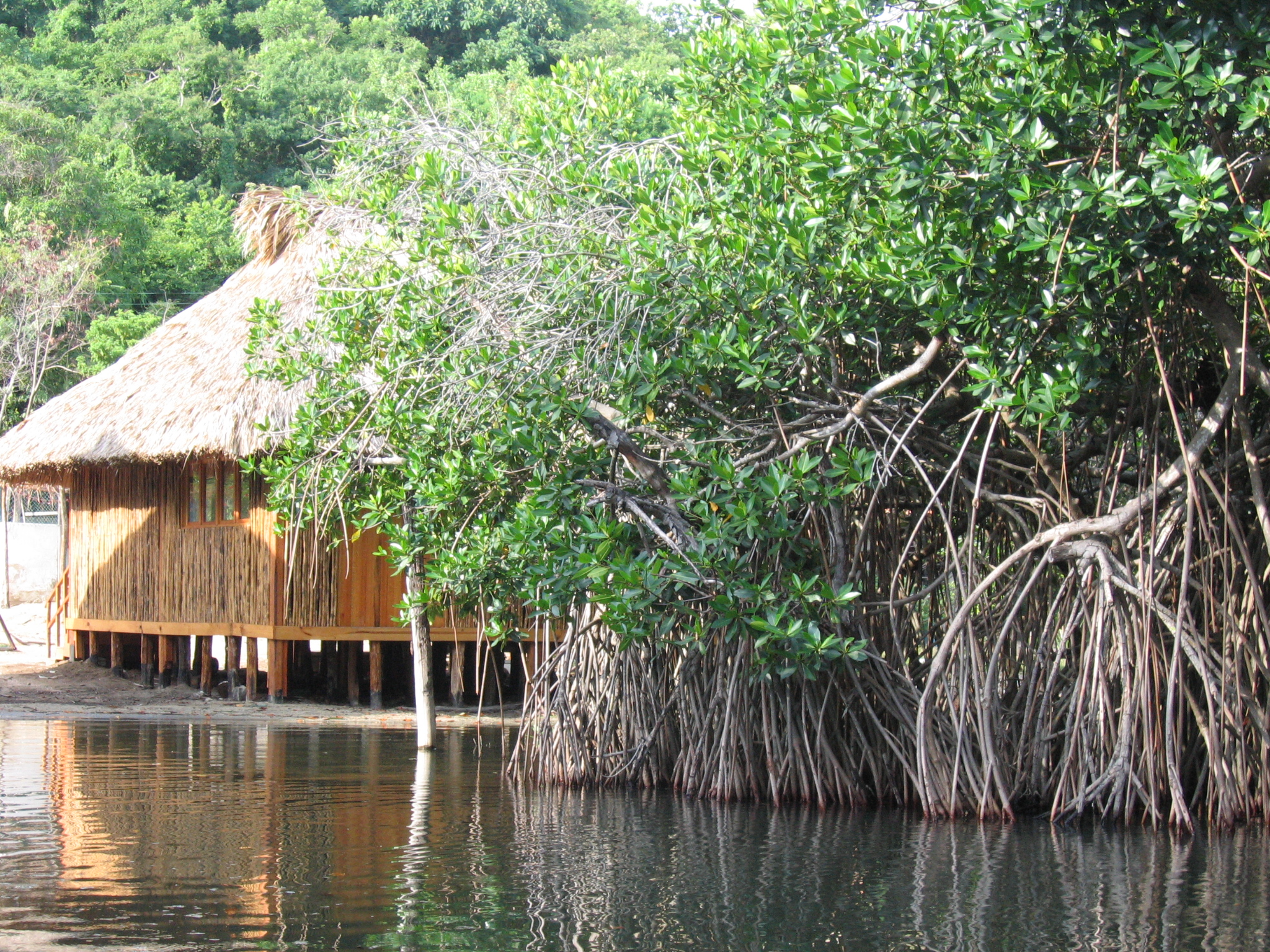
Stilt house on Chacahua lagoon

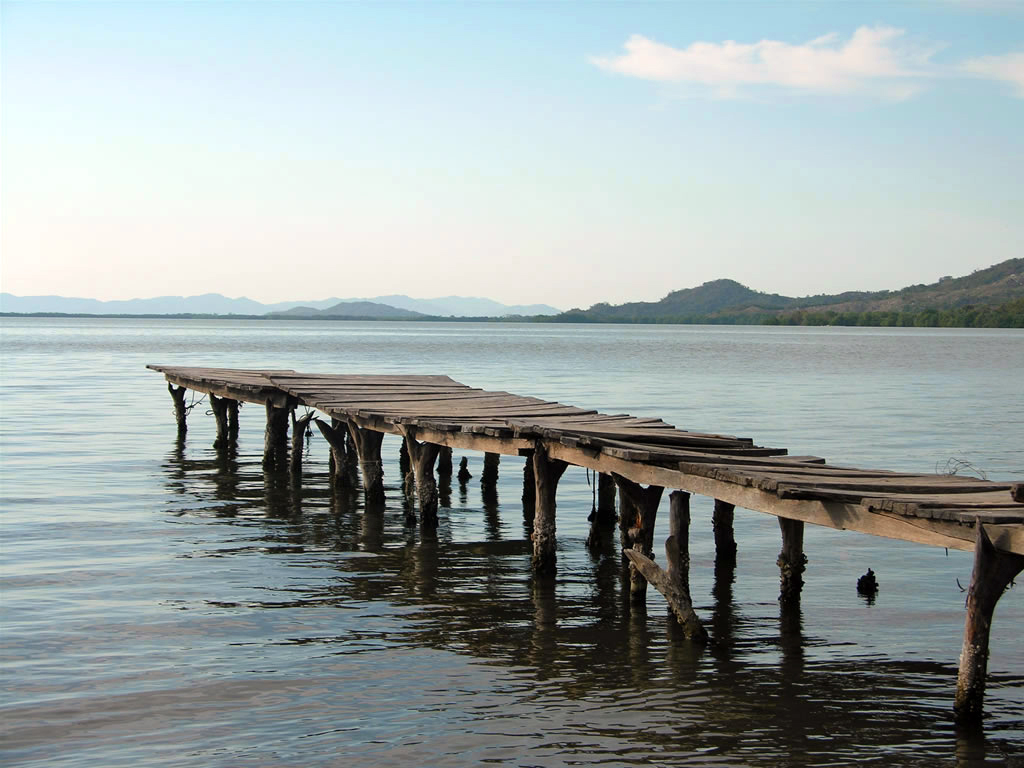
Pier in Cacahua lagoon

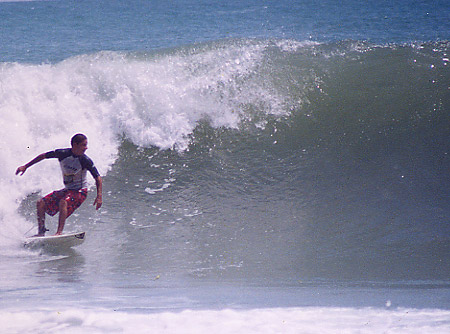
Surfer in Cacahua lagoon

== See also ==
- Tututepec, archaeological site
