= Santos Reyes Nopala =

- Municipality and town
- Location in Mexico
- Coordinates: 16°6′N 97°9′W
- Country: Mexico
- State: Oaxaca

Area
  - Total: 196.48 km^{2} (75.86 sq mi)
- Elevation: 460 m (1,510 ft)

Population (2005)
  - Total: 14,504
- Time zone: UTC-6 (Central Standard Time)

Santos Reyes Nopala is a town and municipality in Oaxaca in south-western Mexico. It is part of the Juquila District in the center of the Costa Region. The name Nopala is derived from the Nahuatl word for nopatlan.

== Geography ==
The municipality covers an area of 196.48 km^{2} at a height of 460 meters above sea level. It is located in a valley near to the Pacific coast. The climate is tropical and humid, with an average temperature of 26 °C, rising in late spring and early summer to 35 °C. Flora is typical of the warm region, including palm trees and a wide variety of plants. Wildlife include deer, badgers, iguana and armadillo.

== History ==
Nopala was founded around 800 BC, and reached its heyday between 500 and 700 AD during what is called the "Cerro Iglesia" (Church Hill) period. During this phase the community was about five miles north of its current location on a hill that overlooks the Pacific Ocean. The site contains important stone structures including a ball court, tombs and temples decorated with sculptures. Some of the large stone steles have been removed from the Cerro Iglesia site and are now preserved in the walls of Nopala city hall. Cerro Iglesia was abandoned around 800 AD for unknown reasons. The people moved about seven miles south and again built large stone buildings, ball court and pyramids. The new site, called "Arroyo de Piedra" (Stone Creek) was discovered by a group of archaeologists from the National Institute of Anthropology and History in 1985, and although unexplored appears to be of great importance.

During the Cerro Iglesia period the government was theocratic. After the move to Arroyo de Piedra, it became a monarchy which lasted until the Spanish arrived in March 1522. The economy was based on cultivation of corn, beans, peppers and squash, as the inhabited area is very wet and could provide up to two crops a year. The city state also traded with its Chatino neighbors and with the coastal Mixtec and the Zapotec people. Society was organized by class. Priests directed and performed religious rites, defined the times of planting and harvesting, and wore unique styles of clothing and ornaments such as earplugs, necklaces and headdresses. The other classes were the military, merchants, architects, sculptors, craftsmen and finally the common people. This last class worked the fields, built and maintained infrastructure and supported the priests. Their religion was polytheistic and idolatrous, worshiping the sun, considered the creator of the race, land, food and life, the moon, goddess of the night, the god of fire and the god of rain or water.

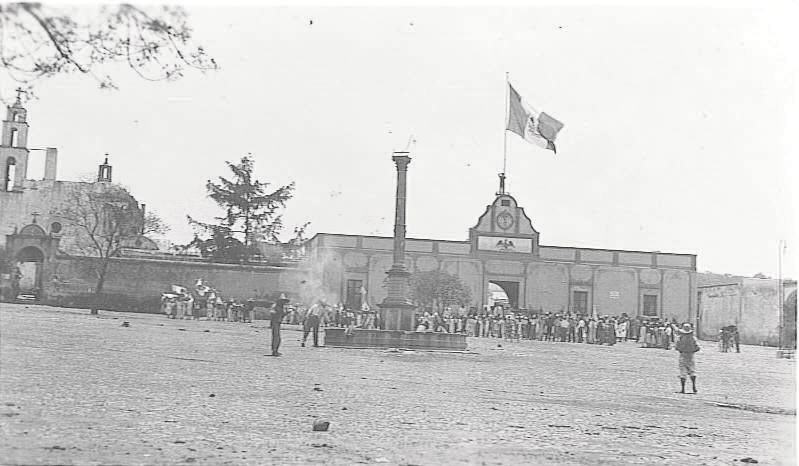
Old photograph of the main square

After the arrival of the Spanish, who defeated the army of Nopala in a bloody battle, the people of the region were severely oppressed and exploited. In 1810 the people rose in rebellion and declared their independence, but were defeated in 1811 by the forces of Captain Antonio Caldelas near the Chacahua lagoon. Another rebellion in 1896 in protest against land seizures and high taxes was again suppressed.

In March 2006 eight left-wing activists were arrested during a police raid in the community of Santiago Cuixtla, in which two people were gravely injured. In May 2010 the mayor was accused of diverting 30 million pesos which allegedly was missing from the budget for public works. One of the problems the funding was meant to address was construction of sewage treatment facilities. At present, discharge from the town pollutes the “El Maíz” river and the downstream Laguna de Manialtepec, causing gastrointestinal diseases and other problems. In the run-up to an election, the PRD candidate in June 2010 accused the Institutional Revolutionary Party (PRI) of a campaign of harassment and threats to ensure that the people voted for their candidate.

== Demography ==
As of 2005, the municipality had 2,968 households with a total population of 14,504 of whom 7,475 spoke an indigenous language. The economy is based on agriculture, with the main crops being coffee, maize and beans. Honey is also produced for sale. A new hospital was inaugurated in Puerto Escondido in December 2009 after delays caused by disputes over jurisdiction, which turned violent at times.

Nopala is one of the centers of the Chatino people, related to the Zapotec but with a distinct language. The people preserve their customs and traditions, which have combined with Judeo-Christian rituals in the annual celebration of the Day of the Dead. The festival is celebrated with bands and processions, concluding with a solemn mass. Tombs in the cemetery are decorated with ornaments, fruits and yellow and magenta flowers from the countryside, and the families of the dead visit to share bread and salt with their deceased relatives. The ceremony is an important tourist attraction.
