= Puerto Escondido =

- City
- Beach in Puerto Escondido

- Location within Mexico
- Coordinates: 15°51′43″N 97°04′18″W
- Country: Mexico
- State: Oaxaca
- Municipality: San Pedro Mixtepec

Area
  - City: 12.06 km^{2} (4.66 sq mi)
- Elevation: 60 m (200 ft)

Population (2020 census)
  - City: 29,903
  - Density: 2,480/km^{2} (6,422/sq mi)
- Time zone: UTC-6 (CST)
- Website: Official website

Puerto Escondido (English: "Hidden Port") is a Mexican city-port and tourist center in the municipality of San Pedro Mixtepec Distrito 22 in the state of Oaxaca. Prior to the 1930s, there was no town. The bay had been used as a port intermittently to ship coffee, but there was no permanent settlement due to the lack of potable water. The name "Puerto Escondido" had roots in the legend of a woman who escaped her captors and hid there. The Nahuatl word for this area was Zicatela, meaning "place of large thorns". Today, it refers to the area's most famous beach.

Puerto Escondido is one of the most important tourist attractions on the Oaxacan coast. It caters to a more downscale and eclectic clientele than neighboring Huatulco, mostly surfers, backpackers and Mexican families. The main attractions are the beaches: Zicatela Beach hosts major surfing competitions, while other beaches have gentle waves. A large lagoon area to the west of the town is popular for fishing and birdwatching.

== History ==
The area around Puerto Escondido had been inhabited by indigenous peoples for centuries, but no towns of any size were established during the pre-Hispanic or colonial eras. The bay was known as Bahia de la Escondida (Bay of the Hidden Woman) due to a legend associated with this place. The story states that a fierce pirate, Andrés Drake, brother of Sir Francis Drake, anchored his ship in the bay when the area was completely uninhabited, to rest for a few days unmolested by authorities.

Some weeks before, he and his crew kidnapped a young Mixtec woman from the village of Santa María Huatulco and took her prisoner. While in the bay, the woman escaped the cabin in which she was being held, and being a good swimmer, jumped overboard to get to shore and hide in the jungle just beyond the beach. Since then, the pirates referred to the woman as "La Escondida" (the hidden one) and every time the ship returned to these waters, the captain ordered his crew to search the area around the bay, however, they never found her. Hence, the area became known as the Bahía de la Escondida.

At the beginning of the 20th century, it was known as Punta Escondida (Hidden Point), then later, Puerto Escondido. At that time, it was just a small fishing village that intermittently was used to ship coffee. Back then, Puerto Escondido suffered from a lack of potable water, although the Colotepec River ran nearby. This caused people to settle in other places. Some did stay, including Nazario Castellanos and Escolástica Valencia, who were the night watchmen for the nearby coffee plantations and considered to be the town's first residents. There was no real town until the 1930s, when Puerto Escondido's activity as a port was more firmly established.

Puerto Escondido belonged to the municipality of Santa María Colotepec. However, eventually the residents petitioned to change jurisdiction to another nearby municipality, San Pedro Mixtepec, which was granted in the 1940s.

From the 1940s to the 1960s, a church was constructed and the first school was built. Wells were dug to alleviate the water supply problems, and generators bought to supply electricity to the pumps and the few streetlights. However, there were still problems getting needed outside supplies such as sugar. These commodities only arrived when a merchant ship entered the bay to sell its wares. Sometimes, this would not happen for months. Residents got by with local products such as fish, poultry, iguanas, chicken and turtle eggs. After the Sola de Vega road to the capital of Oaxaca was constructed, this problem was alleviated somewhat.

In the 1960s, Highway 200 was built, connecting Oaxacan coastal towns with Acapulco. Surfers and other tourists began to find the quiet beaches around Puerto Escondido and tourism began to flourish. Its function as a port diminished as coffee began to be transported by truck. Other infrastructure added included those to supply the area with potable water, a small airport where the Rinconada is now, mail service and some government offices. However, in the 1970s only about 400 people lived in Puerto Escondido.

With time, Puerto Escondido's importance as a tourist attraction increased, with hotels and resorts being constructed. For many years, restaurants were almost exclusively in "palapas" (thatched roof shelters) with fishermen preparing their catches; however, these have mostly given way to modern tourist facilities. Puerto Escondido is one of the most important tourist sites on the Oaxacan coast.

The community of Puerto Escondido is divided between two municipalities. The Zicatela Beach side belongs to the municipality of Santa María Colotepec and the western portion belongs to San Pedro Mixtepec. The boundary between the two municipalities is in dispute, leaving many businesses in limbo, sometimes paying taxes to both municipalities. Puerto Escondido is lobbying for a more independent status with the Congress of the state of Oaxaca, against opposition from San Pedro Mixtepec. 69% of the municipality's population lives in Puerto Escondido. In addition to the above problems, backers of the measure stated that while the community generates most of the municipality's income, it does not receive support from the municipal seat. In August 2008, residents of Puerto Escondido blocked the highway to the municipal seat of San Pedro Mixtepec to protest the lack of money for infrastructure in the town. As of the 2009 census, Puerto Escondido had a population of 20,178

On 30 July 2009, the state congress declared Puerto Escondido to be a city. However, the declaration did not resolve the boundary dispute between San Pedro Mixtepec and Santa María Colotepec.

== The city ==
A view of the city

The morning routine on Playa Principal

Puerto Escondido is mostly located in the municipality of San Pedro Mixtepec in the western portion of Oaxaca's coast also known as the Emerald Coast. Its bay is adjoined by a number of rocky cliffs, which vary in height between 15 and 30 metres. The town center is located on the north side of the bay. The climate is tropical and humid, with an average annual temperature of 28 °C (82 °F) with a rainy season in the summer.

Puerto Escondido is the oldest tourist attraction in the region, and is the main centre of tourist activity, both for nationals and foreigners. The large waves of Zicatela Beach make it a very popular surfing destinations. The port does continue to support commercial fishing activity, and it also attracts people for deep-sea fishing (esp. for sailfish).

Puerto Escondido is not as well-known or visited as other beach resort areas such as Acapulco or Cancún because there are only domestic flights, discouraging a number of visitors. Before the opening of the new highway in 2024, bus rides from the Oaxacan capital took seven hours over hairpin turns as the roads descend the Sierra del Sur mountain range. Most of the bus terminal coming from Oaxaca are located in the downtown.

Puerto Escondido is mostly downscale and rustic, with many small and mid-sized hotels and restaurants, and a few upscale hotels. Most cuisine is based on seafood and local plants, which include eleven species of banana, chocolate and coffee. It also has some Italian restaurants, which were opened by recent Italian immigrants.

The tourist center of Puerto Escondido is not a plaza but Pérez Gazga Avenue, known locally as "El Adoquin" or "La Zona Adoquinada" (the paving stone street). Beginning with a statue of Benito Juárez are found bars, hotels, cafes, restaurants, nightclubs, craft shops, Internet cafes, corner stores, tour operators and scuba diving rental. It also serves as a promenade as it parallels the main beach of the town, and is pedestrian-only after 17:00. At night it is crowded with locals and tourists. This is one of the areas to buy Mexican, especially Oaxacan, handcrafts such as loose-fitting blouses, shirts, vests, wraps, tapestries, handbags, bags, jackets, hammocks, carved stone jewelry, silver and seashell items. However, the main market in the town centre is where you get competitive Mexican prices. Away from the beach above the Adoquin is the Coastal Highway 200.

The Andador Escénico (Scenic Walkway) is a set of paths, stairs and bridges that begin at the main beach of the town and winds its way over rocky oceanside cliffs, passing below the lighthouse to a lookout the named Sueño Posible (Possible Dream). In some places the walkway is very near the ocean and gets wet from the waves.

Each year, the city celebrates Carnival which begins with the "quema de mal humor" or the burning of bad mood. This is done with an effigy with the purpose of ridding the people of bad thoughts and moods in order to enjoy the festivities.

== Education ==
The Universidad del Mar has one of its campuses here.

== Beaches ==
The main attractions of Puerto Escondido are its beaches, which have become internationally known. The area also is attractive to scuba divers because of the variety of fish, large oysters, lobsters and manta rays. Although the Pacific Coast of Mexico generally runs north–south, this section of the coast in Oaxaca runs east–west, Playa Zicatela is on the eastern end.

Puerto Escondido became famous for surfing competitions held at Zicatela Beach every year in November. The competition brings competitors from various countries. Nicknamed the "Mexican Pipeline" due to the similar power and shape of the Banzai Pipeline on the North Shore of Oahu, the wave that breaks on Zicatela Beach draws an international crowd of surfers, bodyboarders and their entourages. Mid to late summer is low season for tourists, but a prime time for waves and international tournaments. A number of international competitions such as the ESPN X Games, and the MexPipe Challenge have taken place. This beach is separated from the other beaches by a rocky outcropping called "El Morro" (the nose). The beach is 50 to 100 metres wide and four kilometres long with large waves that reach up to sixteen metres high. Lifeguards are stationed at this high-risk beach as well as on the other beaches. About half of these are professional and the other half volunteers. Zicatela is still a surfers' beach, with the strong rip current making the area unsuitable for swimming. The Zicatela Beach tourist district caters to surfers, including specials on surfboard rentals. The beach now has a promenade, landscaped with flowers and shrubs along the restaurants, many recently established.

West of Zicatela over the El Moro rocky outcrop is Playa Marinero, which is the preferred beach for swimming as the surf and rip currents are much less. There is some surf, but gentle enough for beginning surfers and bodyboarding.

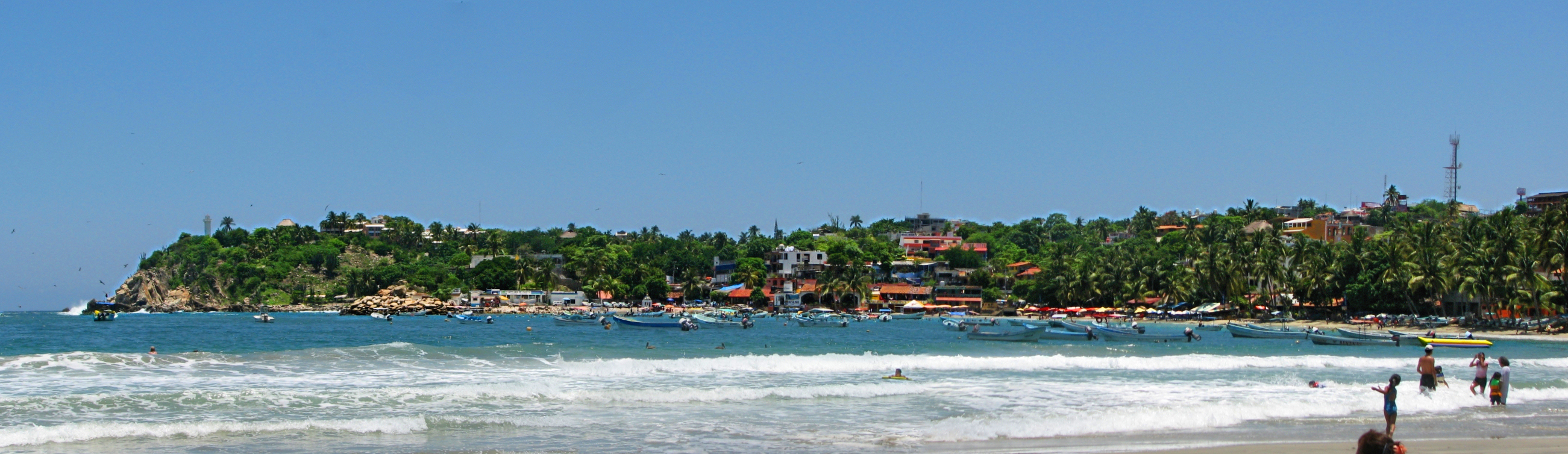
Playa Marinero in Puerto Escondido, Oaxaca, Mexico, with the lighthouse visible on the left

West from Playa Marinero is Playa Principal, or main beach, fronting the town proper. This beach has boats and water taxis are anchored close to shore. Here, fishermen arrive at dawn to sell their catch to local restaurants and families. It is 500 metres long with fine, gray sand and low to moderate surf. This is the primary place to hire boats which take tourists to otherwise inaccessible beaches, to see porpoises and marine turtles or for deep-sea fishing. This beach is also popular with Mexican families to picnic on and play soccer.

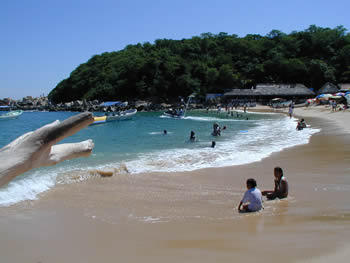
Puerto Angelito Beach

West of the Playa Principal is the lighthouse with a stone walkway, Andador Escénico, below it. From the end of the walkway, and a bit farther west, are the twin beaches of Puerto Angelito and Manzanillo, between which is a small rock outcropping. These are on a sheltered cove, making it safe for swimming, with Manzanillo having slightly more surf. Angelito Beach has small, family-owned restaurants located in palapas (open-air thatched structures). These beaches have water that varies in color from emerald green to turquoise blue. Puerto Angelito tends to be crowded and frequented by busloads of visitors. Playa Manzanillo is quieter as there is no road access.

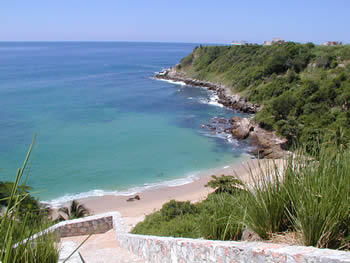
Playa Carrizalillo

West from these beaches is Playa Carrizalillo which has white sand and cobalt blue water edged in light green. This 300-metre-wide (980 ft) beach is on a small bay. There are no vehicular roads to this beach, and the footpath descends a steep slope on a recently installed rock stairway. It takes about fifteen minutes to walk to here from the town. A water taxi ride from Playa Principal is another option for accessing Carrizalillo. Waves are normally gentle, except for a zone that opens directly onto the ocean where waves are big enough for surfing. The difficult access means that the beach is not as crowded with walking vendors as the Puerto Angelito Beach. There are few restaurants and the area is generally cleaner. On the east and west sides of the bay are rocky outcroppings that serve as habitat for a wide variety of fish and coral, making it popular for snorkeling. Near Carrizalillo is the Rinconada, a former landing strip that is now lined with restaurants, salons, and shops. It also contains a lending library run by a local charity run by expatriates.

The westernmost beach is Playa Bacocho with upscale beach clubs. It has fine, soft sand, palm trees, warm, blue-green water and a moderate surf although the far west part of the beach can have a strong rip current. It faces southwest, offering good sunset views. West from Bacocho are still undeveloped beaches.

== Transportation ==
Many people walk in Puerto Escondido for transportation.

Puerto Escondido International Airport has flights to the city of Oaxaca, Monterrey and Mexico City in Mexico and Houston and Dallas in the United States.

Commercial buses from the city of Oaxaca take about three to four hours.

A new three-lane superhighway ("supercarretera") from Oaxaca has been constructed Ventanillas, about 13 km east of Puerto Escondido, where it meets the old coastal Highway 200. The project had several delays and took more than a decade. Its opened in 2024. This road reduces the motor vehicle travel time from Oaxaca to around two and a half hours.

== Media ==
There are an AM and FM radio station and Spanish language weekly newspapers. ¡Viva Puerto! http://vivapuerto.com is the local, bilingual magazine.

== Fiestas de Noviembre ==
The Fiestas de Noviembre (Festivals of November) are held during the month into the beginning of December. Events are scheduled in the San Pedro Mixtepec and Santa María Colotepec jurisdictions and there is little coordination between the events. This usually means a large number of events, with several held concurrently. Zicatela events are often staged on Playa Zicatela while the uptown events are often on Playa Principal or the municipal plaza west and above the main beach. Some of the major events include a motocross event, a sailfishing competition, a festival of coastal dance and a surfing tournament.

== Laguna de Manialtepec ==
About 10 km west from Puerto Escondido is the Laguna de Manialtepec. There is a small village on the way called Bajos de Chila. as well as a small archeological zone of the Chatino culture. This site has a Sun Stone which represented the solar deity and a statue of a high-ranking priest. The lagoon is full of mangroves and many birds such as pelicans, seagulls, ibis, storks, cranes, jacanas, buzzards, kingfishers, swans and other species. Other wildlife here includes raccoons, weasels, deer, wild boar, foxes and crocodiles. A number of these are in danger due to poaching. In the middle of the lagoon is an island named Isla del Gallo, on which according to legend, a rooster can be heard singing every year on December 24.

== See also ==
- Lagunas de Chacahua National Park
- Alejandra Robles
