= Lagunas de Chacahua National Park =

National park in Oaxaca, Mexico

Coordinates: 15°58′1.57″N 97°41′12.59″W

Designations

Ramsar Wetland
- Official name: Lagunas de Chacahua
- Designated: 2 February 2008
- Reference no.: 1819

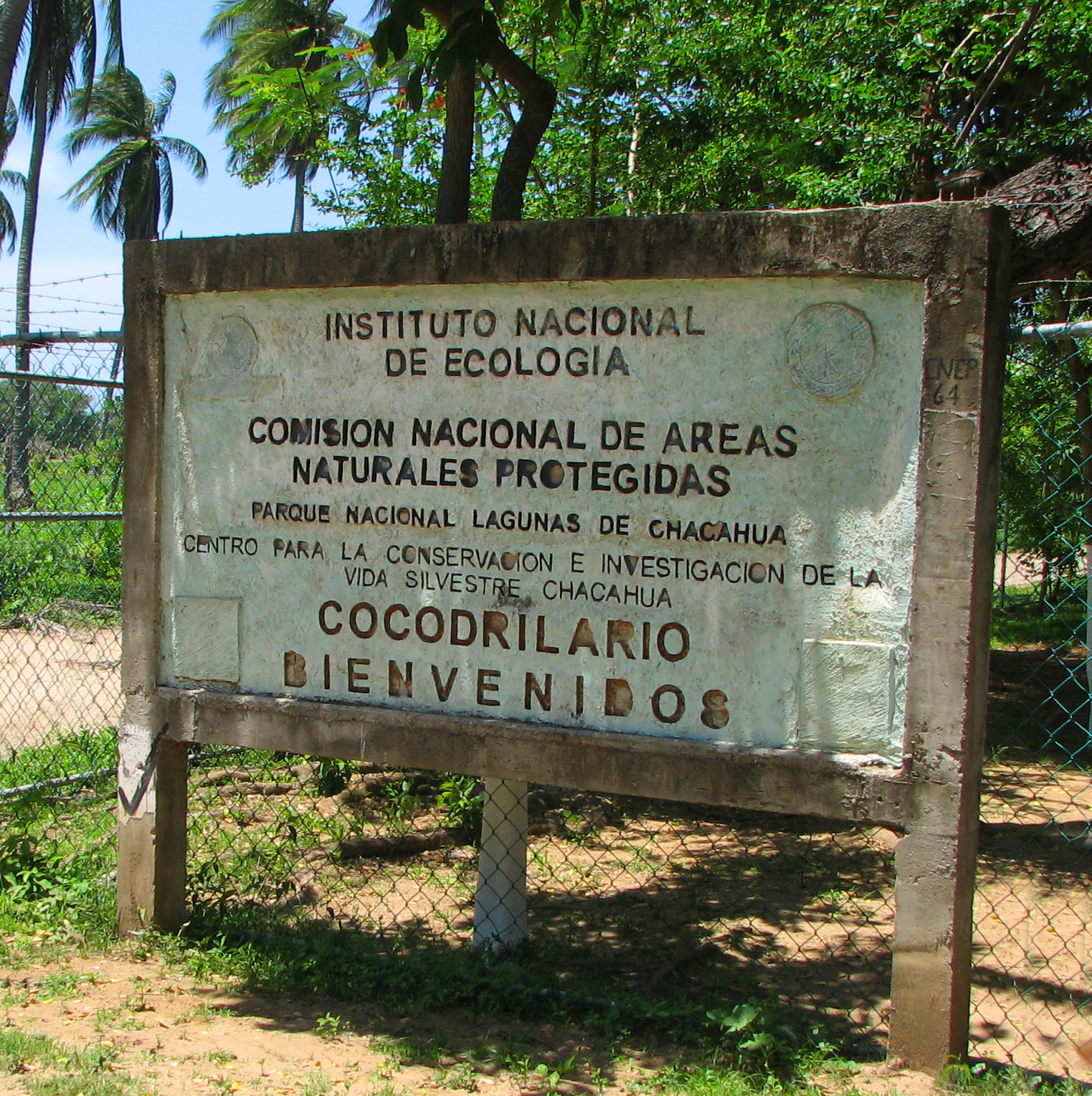
Entrance to the Crocodile nursery located inside the Lagunas de Chacahua National Park

The Lagunas de Chacahua National Park (Spanish: Parque Nacional Lagunas de Chacahua), created in 1937, is a national park located in the Municipality of Villa de Tututepec de Melchor Ocampo in the Mexican state of Oaxaca, about 54 km west of Puerto Escondido, near a village called Zapotalito. It can be reached via Federal Highway 200 or by boat from Puerto Escondido. It is located between the towns of Santiago Jamiltepec and Puerto Escondido. The park encompasses 132.73 square kilometres, about 30 km^{2} of which is taken by various lagoons such as the Laguna de Chacahua, Laguna de La Pastoria, and Laguna Las Salinas. There are various smaller lagoons that are connected by narrow channels. The rest of the park consists of dry land. The park has 10 different types of vegetation: “selva espinosa", swampland, deciduous, sub tropical broadleaf, mangroves, savannah, “bosque de galleria”, “tular”, palm trees, and coastal dunes. 246 species of flowers and 189 species of animals have been documented so far in the park. Birds such as storks, herons, wild ducks, blue-winged teals, pelicans, and spoonbills can be found here. Three species of turtles also visit the park to lay their eggs.

There are boat tours to observe the shores, mangroves and the many birds that fish these waters. These tours usually include a stop to sample the local food and to visit a crocodile nursery which raises several Mexican Pacific coast crocodiles (Crocodylus acutus).

== See also ==
- Laguna de Manialtepec
