= Santa María Colotepec =

- Municipality and town
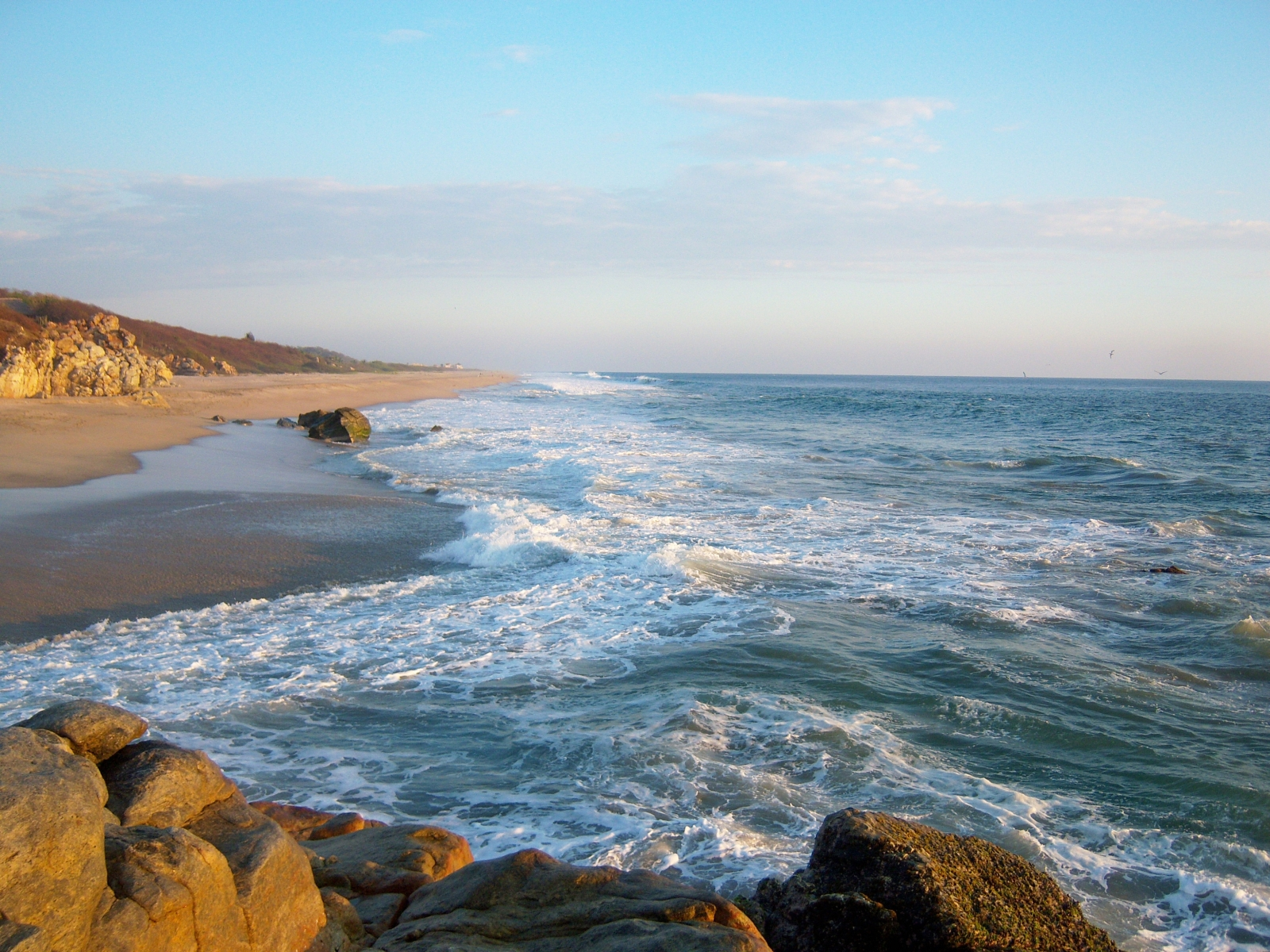
- Playa in Brisas de Zicatela

- Location in Mexico
- Coordinates: 15°53′N 96°55′W
- Country: Mexico
- State: Oaxaca

Population (2010)
  - Total: 22,562
- Time zone: UTC-6 (Central Standard Time)

Santa María Colotepec is a town and municipality in Oaxaca in south-western Mexico. The municipality covers an area of 415.837 km^{2} (257.87 square miles). It is part of the Pochutla District in the east of the Costa Region.

Abraham Ibarra Robles, a public servant from Santa María Colotepec, was murdered on January 20, 2017.
