= San Gabriel Mixtepec =

- Municipality and town
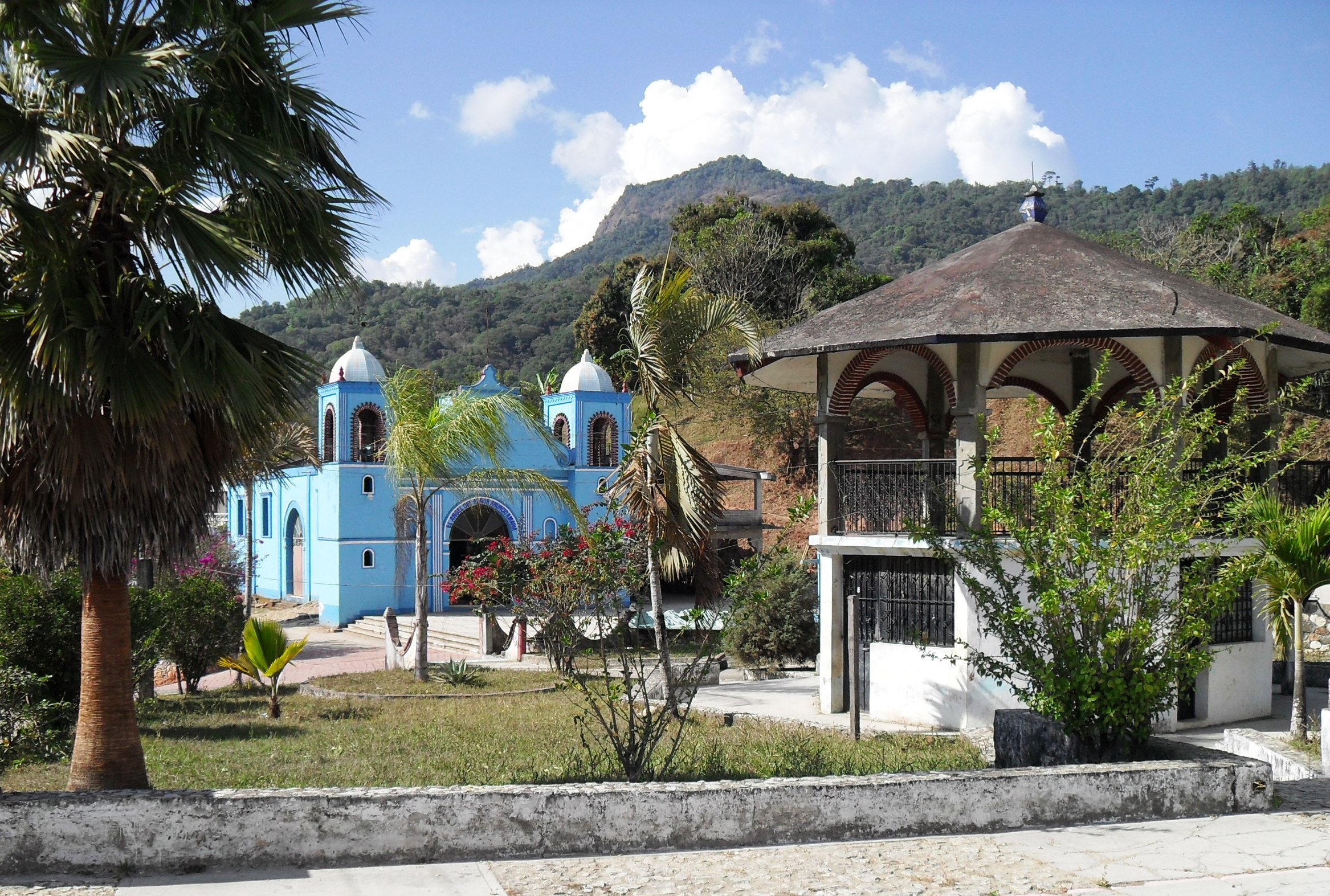

- Location in Mexico
- Coordinates: 16°4′58″N 97°6′0″W
- Country: Mexico
- State: Oaxaca

Area
  - Total: 482.26 km^{2} (186.20 sq mi)

Population (2005)
  - Total: 3,930
- Time zone: UTC-6 (Central Standard Time)

San Gabriel Mixtepec is a town and municipality in Oaxaca in south-western Mexico. It is part of the Juquila District in the center of the Costa Region. The name "Mixtepec" means "Hill of clouds".

== Geography ==
The municipality covers an area of 482.26 km^{2} of hilly terrain in the foothills of the Sierra Madre del Sur, at an altitude of 1380 meters above sea level. The climate is warm subhumid, with an average temperature of 24 °C and annual rainfall of 1301.7 mm. Flora include roses of different types, tulips, cedar and pine. Mango, avocado, nanche and mamey sapote fruit trees are grown. Wild fauna includes deer, iguanas, squirrel, raccoon, fox, chachalaca, dove, vulture, snakes of different types including coral snakes, wild boar and hawk.

== Demography ==
As of 2005, the municipality had 848 households with a total population of 3,930 of whom 87 spoke an indigenous language.

== Economy ==
The majority of the population are engaged in agriculture. The moist, fertile soils are suitable for growing corn, coffee, beans, bananas, cocoa, orange, lemon, pineapple and chili. Less important activities include logging, animal husbandry and trade.
