= Chatino languages =

Indigenous Mesoamerican languages of Mexico

Chatino
- Chaqcña, Chaqꟳ tnyaᴶ
- Geographic distribution: Oaxaca, Mexico
- Ethnicity: Chatino people
- Native speakers: 52,000 (2020 census)
- Linguistic classification: Oto-Manguean: Zapotecan; Chatino
- Subdivisions: Highland Chatino; Zacatepec Chatino; Tataltepec Chatino; Zenzontepec Chatino; Teojomulco Chatino †

Language codes
- Glottolog: chat1268

Chatino is a group of indigenous Mesoamerican languages. These languages are a branch of the Zapotecan family within the Oto-Manguean language family. They are natively spoken by 45,000 Chatino people, whose communities are located in the southern portion of the Mexican state of Oaxaca.

The Chatinos have close cultural and linguistic ties with the Zapotec people, whose languages form the other branch of the Zapotecan language family. Chatinos call their language chaqꟳ tnyaᴶ. (Note: chaqꟳ means 'word', but Chatinos do not agree on the meaning of tnyaᴶ. For communities such as Zenzontepec, in San Juan Quiahije, it means 'low', while in Santiago Yaitepec it means 'spicy'. Its meaning is not recoverable in San Marcos Zacatepec or Santa Maria Yolotepec.) Chatino is recognized as a national language in Mexico.

== Varieties ==
The Chatino languages are a group of three languages: Zenzontepec Chatino, spoken in about 10 communities in the district of Sola de Vega; Tataltepec Chatino, spoken in Tataltepec de Valdés; and a group of dialects collectively called the Eastern Chatino language, spoken in about 15–17 communities. Egland & Bartholomew (1983) conducted mutual intelligibility tests on the basis of which they concluded that four varieties of Chatino could be considered separate languages with respect to mutual intelligibility, with 80% intelligibility being needed for varieties to be considered part of the same language. (The same count resulted from a looser 70% criterion.) These were Tataltepec, Zacatepec, Panixtlahuaca, and the Highlands dialects, with Zenzontepec not tested but based on other studies believed to be completely unintelligible with the rest of the Chatino languages. The Highlands dialects fall into three groups, largely foreshadowing the divisions in Ethnologue.

Campbell (2013), in a study based on shared innovations rather than mutual intelligibility, first divides Chatino into two groups: Zenzontepec and Coastal Chatino. He then divides Coastal Chatino into Tataltepec and Eastern Chatino. His Eastern Chatino contains all the other varieties, and he finds no evidence for subgrouping or further division based on shared innovations. This division mirrors the divisions reported by Boas (1913), based on speaker comments, that Chatino comprised three "dialects" with limited mutual intelligibility. Sullivant (2016) finds that Teojomulco is the most divergent variety.

- Teojomulco
- Core Chatino
  - Zenzontepec
  - Coastal Chatino
    - Tataltepec
    - Eastern Chatino (incl. Zacatepec, Lachao-Yolotepec, Yaitepec, Panixtlahuaca, Quiahije and Nopala dialects)

== Revitalization ==
The Mexican Secretariat of Education uses a four risk scale to measure endangered languages. The lowest is no immediate risk of disappearance, then medium risk, high risk, and lastly very high risk of disappearance. Currently, Chatino dialects vary from high risk of disappearance (chatino de Zacatepec) to medium risk (chatino occidental bajo) to no immediate risk (chatino oriental alto, chatino oriental bajo, chatino occidental alto, and chatino central).

In an effort to help revitalize the Chatino language, a team of linguists and professors came together to make The Chatino Language Documentation Project. The team included Emiliana Cruz, Hilaria Cruz, Eric Campbell, Justin McIntosh, Jeffrey Rasch, Ryan Sullivant, Stéphanie Villard, and Tony Woodbury. They began the Chatino Documentation Project in the summer of 2003 hoping to document and preserve the Chatino Language and its dialects. Using audio and video recordings they have been able to document the language during everyday life interactions. Up until 2003, Chatino was an oral language, with no written form. After beginning the Chatino Documentation project, the team began to create a written form of the Chatino Language. This transition has created more resources for revitalization projects. They hope the resources they have made will soon be used to create educational materials like books to help the Chatino people be able to read and write their language.

== Orthography ==
The glottal stop is variously written as a 'q' (as here), a '7', IPA 'ʔ', or a saltillo 'ꞌ'. The last can be confused with the tone letter '^{I}' in a non-serif font.

Tone letters in many varieties of Western Highlands Chatino are capital letters A through L and S. These have dedicated Unicode characters (ᴬ ᴮ ꟲ ᴰ ᴱ ꟳ ᴳ ᴴ ᴵ ᴶ ᴷ ᴸ ꟱).

== Morphology ==
=== Transitive-Intransitive alternations ===
Chatino languages have some regular alternations between transitive and intransitive verbs. In general this change is shown by altering the first consonant of the root, as in the following examples from Tataltepec Chatino:

gloss	transitive	intransitive
'change'	ntsaqa	nchaqa
'finish'	ntyee	ndyee
'put out'	nxubiq	ndyubiq
'scare'	nchcutsi	ntyutsi
'melt'	nxalá	ndyalá
'throw'	nchcuaa	ndyalu
'bury'	nxatsi	ndyatsi
'frighten'	ntyutsi	nchcutsi
'move'	nchquiña	nguiña
'roast'	nchquiqi	nguiqi

=== Causative alternations ===
There is also a morphological causative in Chatino, expressed by the causative prefix /x-/, /xa-/, /y/, or by the palatalization of the first consonant. The choice of prefix appears to be partially determined by the first consonant of the verb, though there are some irregular cases. The prefix /x/ occurs before some roots that start with one of the following consonants: /c, qu, ty/ or with the vowels /u,a/, e.g.

catá chcu	'bathe' (reflexive)	xcatá jiqi	'bathe' (transitive)
quityi	'dry' (reflexive)	xquityi jiqi	'dry' (tr)
ndyuqu	'is alive'	nxtyuqu jiqi	'waken'
ndyubiq	'is put out'	nxubiq	'put out'
tyatsiq	'is buried'	xatsiq	'bury'

The prefix /xa/ is put before certain roots that begin with /t/, e.g.

nduu	'is stopping'	nxatuu	'to stop something'

Palatalization occurs in some roots that begin with /t/, e.g.

taa 'will give'
tyaa 'will pay'

(Pride 1970: 95–96)

The alternations seen here are similar to the causative alternation seen in the related Zapotec languages.

=== Aspect ===
Pride (1965) reports eight aspects in Yaitepec Chatino.

1. potential The majority of the verbs have no potential prefix, and its absence indicates this aspect.
2. habitual This is indicated by the prefixes /n-, nd-, l-/ and /n-/ with palatalization of the first consonant of the root, e.g.:
  nsta 'puts it in'
  nsta chcubi loo mesa 'puts the box on the table'
  nduqni cuqna 'graze'
  Nduqni nguq cuqna quichi re 'The people of this town graze'
  ntya 'sow'
  Ntya nguq quichi re quiña' 'The people of this town sow chile.'
3. continuative Roots that take /n-/ or /nd-/ in the habitual have the same in the continuative plus palatalization; roots that have /n-/ plus palatalization in the habitual have /ndya-/, e.g.
  Nxtya chcubi loo mesa 'is putting the box on the table'
  Ndyuqni nguq cuqna quichi re 'The people of this town are grazing.'
  Ndyata nguq quichi re quiña' 'The people of this town are sowing chile.'
4. completive This is indicated with the prefix /ngu-/, and verbs that start with /cu-, cui-, qui-/ change to /ngu-/ and /ngüi-/ in the completive:
  sta 'will put it'
  Ngu-sta chcubi loo mesa 'Someone put the box on the table'
  culuqu 'will teach it'
  Nguluqu mstru jiqi 'The teacher taught it.'
5. imperative This aspect is indicated by palatalization in the first consonant of the potential form of the verb. If the potential is already a palatalized consonant, the imperative is the same, e.g.:
  sati' 'will slacken', xatiq jiqi 'let it loose!'
  xiqyu 'will cut', xiqyu jiqi 'cut it!'
6. perfective This aspect is indicated by the particle /cua/, which is written as a separate word in Pride (1965).
  tyee 'will end'
  cua tyee ti 'is ended'
  cua ndya ngu' 'is gone'
7. passive potential /tya-/
  Tyaala tonqniqi 'The door will be opened.'
8. passive completive /ndya-/
  Ndyaala tonqniqi 'The door is open.'

=== Syntax ===
Chatino languages usually have VSO as their predominant order, as in the following example:

N-da nu xniq ndaha ska ha xtlya qi nu qo.
CON-give the dog lazy one tortilla Spanish to the coyote
'The lazy dog gave a sweetbread to the coyote.'

== Use and media ==
Chatino-language programming is carried by the CDI's radio station XEJAM, based in Santiago Jamiltepec, Oaxaca.

In 2012, the Natividad Medical Center of Salinas, California had trained medical interpreters bilingual in Chatino as well as in Spanish; in March 2014, Natividad Medical Foundation launched Indigenous Interpreting+, "a community and medical interpreting business specializing in indigenous languages from Mexico and Central and South America," including Chatino, Mixtec, Trique, and Zapotec.

== See also ==
- Chatino Sign Language, used in the Western Highland Chatino villages of San Juan Quiahije and Cieneguilla

== Bibliography ==
- Boas, Franz. 1913. "Notes on the Chatino language of Mexico," American Anthropologist, n.s., 15:78–86.
- Campbell, Eric (2013). "The Internal Diversification and Subgrouping of Chatino". International Journal of American Linguistics. 79: 395–420. doi:10.1086/670924. JSTOR 10.1086/670924..
- Cruz, Emiliana. 2004. The phonological patterns and orthography of San Juan Quiahije Chatino. University of Texas Masters Thesis. Austin.
- Cruz, Emiliana and Anthony C Woodbury. 2014. Finding a way into a family of tone languages: The story and methods of the Chatino Language Documentation Project. Language Documentation & Conservation 8: 490–524.
- Cruz, Hilaria. 2015. Linguistic poetic and rhetoric of Eastern Chatino of San Juan Quiahije (Ph.D. thesis, University of Texas at Austin).
- Egland, Steven, Doris Bartholomew & Saúl Cruz Ramos. 1978. La inteligibilidad interdialectal de las lenguas indígenas de México: Resultado de algunos sondeos. Mexico City: Instituto Lingüístico de Verano (1983 reprint).
- Pride, Kitty. 1965. Chatino syntax. SIL Publications in Linguistics #12.
- Pride, Leslie and Kitty. 1970. Vocabulario Chatino de Tataltepec. Serie de vocabularios indigenas mariano silva y aceves, no. 15. Summer Institute of Linguistics.
- Rasch, Jeffrey Walker. 2002. The basic morpho-syntax of Yaitepec Chatino. Ph.D. thesis. Rice University.
- Sullivant, J. Ryan. 2016. "Reintroducing Teojomulco Chatino," International Journal of American Linguistics 82:393–423.
- Villard S. Grammatical sketch of Zacatepec Chatino. Master's thesis, University of Texas at Austin, Austin, Texas. 2008.
