= Costa Region =

- Region
- Oaxaca regions - Costa to the south
- Coordinates: 15°51′43″N 97°4′2″W
- Country: Mexico
- State: Oaxaca
- Largest settlement: Puerto Escondido

Area
  - Total: 12,502 km^{2} (4,827 sq mi)

Population (2020)
  - Total: 594,088

The Costa Region or Costa Chica lies on the Pacific coast of the state of Oaxaca, Mexico, south of the more mountainous Sierra Sur inland from the coast. It includes the districts of Jamiltepec, Juquila and Pochutla.

== Climate ==
The region has a tropical climate in the coastal plain, with a more temperate climate higher up. Average temperatures range between 24 and 26 °C (75.2 and 78.8 °F), and maximum annual rainfall is between 730 and 2,000 mm (28.7 and 78.7 in) -

== Economy ==
The population is mainly engaged in agriculture and waterfront fisheries. One of the best coffees in the world, the Pluma Hidalgo, is cultivated in the Pochutla district. In other parts of the region lemons are grown to make lemon oil, a raw material for perfumes and medicines. Pine and oak wood is harvested for plywood. Ranching is a major source of revenue. There is also small-scale exploitation of iron, copper and magnesium, and the region has titanium deposits.

It is a tourist region, based on the beaches of Huatulco and Puerto Escondido. To develop this industry, the government has emphasized construction of airports, ports and tourist roads.

== People ==
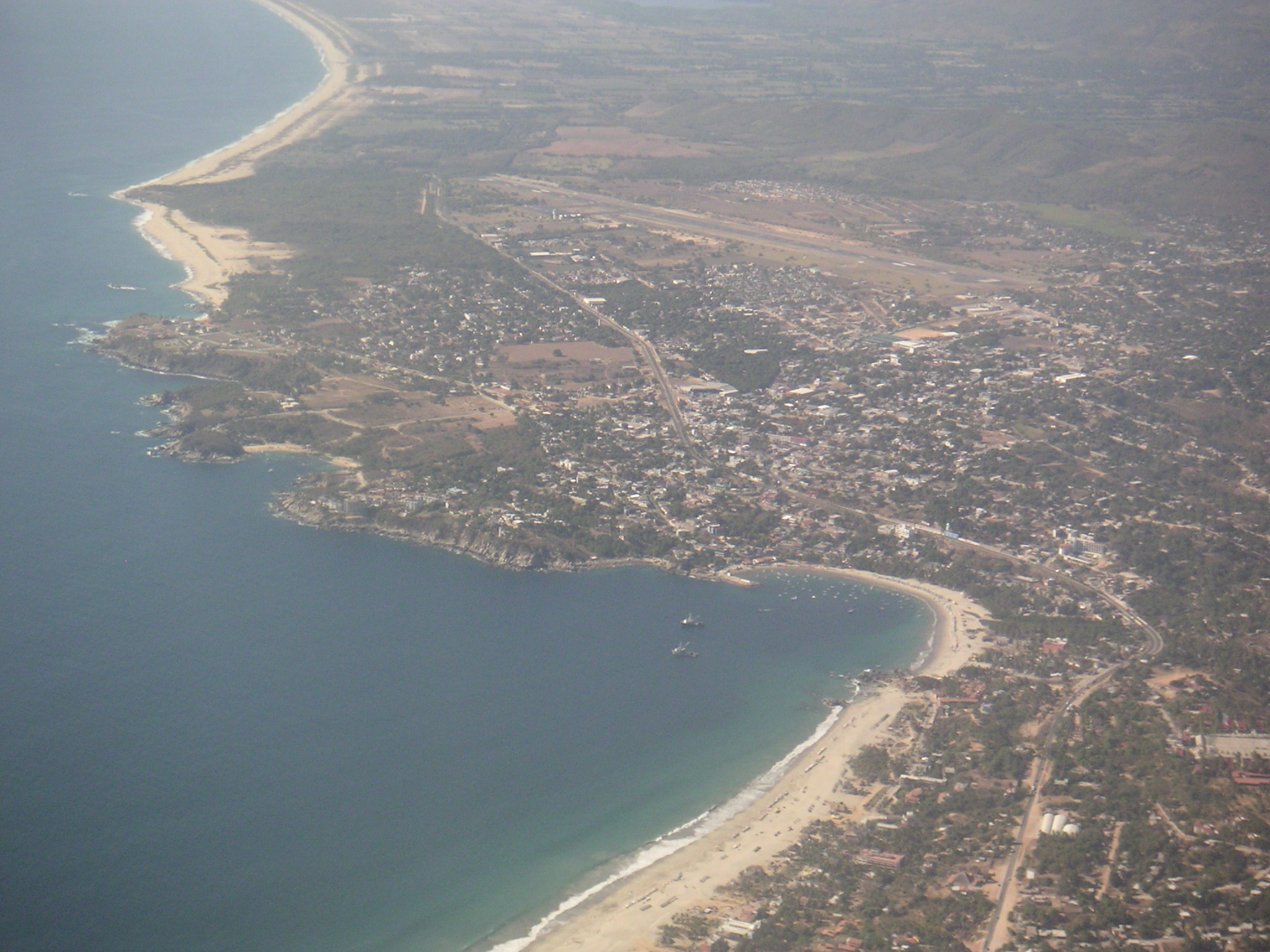
Puerto Escondido.

Historically the region has been tied culturally and economically with the Costa Chica in the state of Guerrero and with Acapulco in particular, rather than with the city of Oaxaca. The reasons are that the coasts of Oaxaca and Guerrero states share a common history, and the Federal Highway 200 connects the coasts of both states.

The population includes Mestizos and Afro-Mexicans, as well as indigenous Mixtec, Amuzgo, Chatino, Chontal, Zapotec peoples. The famous Oaxacan troubadour Álvaro Carrillo was born in San Juan Cacahuatepec.

Important towns or municipalities include: Pinotepa Nacional, Pochutla, Puerto Escondido, Puerto Ángel, Santa Catarina Juquila, Santa María Huatulco, Jamiltepec, Tututepec, Pinotepa de Don Luis, San Juan Cacahuatepec, San Pedro Jicayán, Santos Reyes Nopala, San Gabriel Mixtepec, San Agustín Loxicha, and Pluma Hidalgo. Santa Catarina Juquila is one of the most important religious centers of Mexico, where many people visit the shrine of the Virgin of Juquila each year.

== Dance ==
Dance is an important element of the coast's cultural life. Dance in this area is an amalgam of indigenous, "African" and Spanish elements, much like the rest of the culture here. Authorities here, including village elders, the town councils, municipal authorities as well as important village figures have worked to keep traditions, such as the "sones" (traditional music) and "chilenas" (dance performed particularly in Pinotepa Nacional) alive. The area hosts an annual ‘’’Coastal Dance Festival’’ with the purpose of preserving and popularizing traditional coast dances.

One example of local dance is the Petate Bull dance. There are numerous bull dances in Mexico but the version that is performed in the village of Santiago Collantes in the municipality of Pinotepa Nacional, is a lively, vivacious dance inspired by local history. This dance is the best-known of the region and was performed in 1911 when Mexican president Francisco Madero visited the village. According to legend, the president was so pleased with the performance that he shook each dancer's hand and promised them gifts from the capital if they continued to perform the dance. While no such gifts came, the town has continued to perform the dance as part of the town's yearly festival. Santiago Collantes is also known for its version of the Devil's Dance, which is related to the hardships of slavery and serf-like conditions that the slaves suffered. Pinotepa Nacional has its well-known Chilena dance, which may be related to the cueca (or zamueca) dances of South America. Other dances performed in the area include the Turtle Dance, the Tiger Dance, and the old and new versions of the Badger's Dance.

Every year in November the government organizes the Coastal Dance Festival, where regional groups from the Oaxaca coast and guests from Michoacán, Guerrero and Chiapas in Puerto Escondido have assembled since 1994 to give exhibitions of the traditional dances of the southern Pacific region.

== Largest cities ==
Largest cities or towns in Costa Region Source: INEGI
Rank		Municipality	Pop.
1	Santiago Pinotepa Nacional	Santiago Pinotepa Nacional	33,276
2	Puerto Escondido	San Pedro Mixtepec-Distrito 22	29,903
3	La Crucecita	Santa María Huatulco	19,252
4	Río Grande	Villa de Tututepec de Melchor Ocampo	15,373
5	San Pedro Pochutla	San Pedro Pochutla	14,071
6	Brisas de Zicatela	Santa María Colotepec	10,632
7	Santa María Huatulco	Santa María Huatulco	10,504
8	Santiago Jamiltepec	Santiago Jamiltepec	10,387
9	Santa Catarina Juquila	Santa Catarina Juquila	8,084
10	Bajos de Chila	San Pedro Mixtepec-Distrito 22	6,694
