= Tataltepec Chatino =

Zapotecan language of Oaxaca, Mexico

- Lowland Chatino
- Native to: Mexico
- Region: Oaxaca
- Native speakers: 540 (2015)
- Language family: Oto-Manguean: Zapotecan; Chatino; Tataltepec Chatino

Language codes
- ISO 639-3: cta
- Glottolog: tata1258

Tataltepec Chatino, also known as Lowland Chatino and Chatino Occidental Bajo, is an indigenous Mesoamerican language, one of the Chatino family of the Oto-Manguean languages. It is not intelligible with other Chatino languages. It is named after the town of Tataltepec de Valdés, and is also spoken in San Pedro Tututepec.

== Status ==
Tataltepec de Valdés is divided between Chatinos, only a few of whom know Chatino, and Mestizos, none of whom know Chatino. Spanish is the dominant language of Tataltepec de Valdés, and is the only language used in all domains of public life except for conversations between speakers of Tataltepec Chatino. Unlike in other Chatino-speaking towns, loudspeakers used for public announcements broadcast exclusively in Spanish. Spanish is the only language used for government, but Chatino-speaking officials use the language when no monolingual Spanish-speakers are present. Unlike other Chatino communities, ceremonies welcoming new officials to local government are conducted entirely in Spanish.

Chatino speakers know that their numbers are in decline, but there are some movements towards revitalization. There are signs of nostalgia among all community members for the language, including among the younger generation, and public events feature young Chatinos (typically semi-speakers) who are using the language in various ways. Proficiency in Tataltepec is increasingly no longer being taken for granted, who increasingly view even some knowledge of Tataltepec Chatino as praiseworthy.

== Phonology ==
=== Vowels ===
There are five vowels: /a, e, i, o, u/. All vowels except for /u/ can be nasalized, and all vowels (oral and nasal) can be lengthened.

=== Consonants ===
		Labial	Alveolar		Velar		Laryngeal
		Labial	plain	laminal	plain	labialized	Laryngeal
Stop		p	t	tʲ	k	kʷ	ʔ
Affricate			t͡s	t͡ʃ			
Fricative		(f)	s	ʃ			h
Nasal		m	n	nʲ			
Approximant	median	(β̞)		j̊ j		w	
Approximant	lateral		l	lʲ			
Flap			ɾ				

All labial consonants occur more rarely than other consonants, and /β̞/ and /f/ occur mainly in nativized loanwords.

=== Tones ===
Tataltepec Chatino has a complex tone system consisting of eight tone sequences, of which each has up to two constituent tones. These tones are characterized as being low, high, mid-level falling, and superhigh rising. The falling tone displays a very minimal contour.

== Sources ==
- Sullivant, John Ryan (2011). Tataltepec Chatino Verb Classification and Aspect Morphology (Thesis). University of Texas at Austin. hdl:2152/ETD-UT-2011-05-3378.
