= Eastern Chatino =

Zapotecan language of Oaxaca, Mexico

Highland Chatino
- Sierra Chatino
- Native to: Mexico
- Region: Oaxaca
- Native speakers: (36,220 cited 2000)
- Language family: Oto-Manguean: Zapotecan; Chatino; Zacatepec–Highlands; Highland Chatino

Language codes
- ISO 639-3: Variously: ctp – Western Highland cly – Eastern Highland (Lachao-Yolotepec) cya – Nopala ctz – Zacatepec
- Glottolog: east2736
- ELP: Western Highland Chatino

Highland Chatino is an indigenous Mesoamerican language, one of the Chatino family of the Oto-Manguean languages. Dialects are rather diverse; neighboring dialects are about 80% mutually intelligible.

For grammatical details, see Chatino languages, which includes examples from Yaitepec dialect.

== Dialects ==
Eastern Chatino is spoken in 14 dialects in 17 communities that centered on the economic and cultural centers of Santa Catarina Juquila and Santiago Yaitepec. ISO assigns these dialects to four groups with different language codes, but there is no objective evidence that the dialects grouped together are closest to each other. Dialects include:

Lachao-Yolotepec
Yaitepec
Panixtlahuaca
Quiahije
Nopala
Zacatepec

== Phonology ==
=== Yaitepec Chatino ===
Yaitepec Chatino has the following phonemic consonants (Rasch 2002):

Consonants
		Bilabial	Alveolar		Palatal	Velar		Glottal		
		Bilabial	plain	pal.	Palatal	plain	lab.	plain	lab.	pal.
Plosive	voiceless	p	t		c	k	kʷ	ʔ		
Plosive	voiced		d		ɟ	ɡ	ɡʷ			
Affricate	voiceless		t͡s		t͡ʃ					
Affricate	voiced		d͡z							
Fricative	voiceless		s		ʃ			h	hʷ	hʲ
Fricative	voiced		z		ʒ					
Nasal	plain	m	n	nʲ						
Nasal	preglottal		ʔn	ʔnʲ						
Lateral			l	lʲ						
Rhotic			ɾ							
Approximant	plain				j		w			
Approximant	preglottal				ʔj		ʔw			

- Sounds /d͡z, ʒ/ only rarely occur.
- Other fricative sounds /ð, ɣ/ may also appear as a result of Spanish loanwords.
- /hʷ/ is heard as a labio-dental [f] when preceding consonants.
- Nasals when preceding consonants, are heard as syllabic [n̩, m̩].
- A bilabial nasal /m/ can also be written as ⟨nw⟩ orthographically. When ⟨nw⟩ is preceding a /k/, it is pronounced as [ŋʷ], elsewhere; it is heard as [m].
- /w/ can be heard as a bilabial fricative [β], when preceding sounds /j, i, e/ in word-initial position.
- /n/ assimilates as [ŋ] when preceding velar consonants /k, ɡ/.
- /k/ is heard as [kʲ] when preceding /e/.
- /j/ is heard as voiceless [j̊] when preceding a voiceless consonant.

Vowels
	Front		Central	Back	
	oral	nasal	Central	oral	nasal
Close	i	ɪ̃		u	ũ
Mid	e	ɛ̃		o	ũ
Open			a		

An epenthetic schwa sound [ə] is heard in between consonants.

Rasch (2002) reports ten distinct tones for Yaitepec Chatino: the four level tones of high /˥/, mid /˦/, low-mid /˨/, and low /˩/; the two rising tones /˦˥/ and /˨˦/; and the three falling tones /˥˦/, /˦˨/, /˨˩/, as well as a more limited falling tone /˦˩/, found in a few lexical items and in a few completive forms of verbs.

== Orthography ==
There are a variety of practical orthographies for Chatino, most based on Spanish orthography. Typically, ⟨x⟩ = /ʃ/, ⟨ch⟩ = /tʃ/, and /k/ is spelled ⟨c⟩ before back vowels but ⟨qu⟩ before front vowels.

In Quiahije Chatino, and perhaps more broadly across Highland Chatino, superscript capitals A–L are used as lexical tone letters: ⟨ᴬ ᴮ ꟲ ᴰ ᴱ ꟳ ᴳ ᴴ ᴵ ᴶ ᴷ ᴸ⟩, with additional letters ⟨ᴹ⟩ and ⟨꟱⟩ for tone sandhi. Not all of these are distinct in all dialects; rather, they mark pan-dialect tone-cognate sets.

In Yaitepec dialect, the pronunciations are:

⟨ᴬ⟩ [˧] (3)
⟨ᴮ⟩ [˦˨] (24)
⟨ꟲ⟩ = ⟨ᴷ⟩ [˦˧] (23)
⟨ᴰ⟩ [˥˨] (14)
⟨ᴱ⟩ [˥] (1)
⟨ꟳ⟩ = ⟨ᴸ⟩ [˧˦] (32)
⟨ᴳ⟩ [˥˦] (12)
⟨ᴴ⟩ [˨˧] (43)
⟨ᴵ⟩ [˦] (2)
⟨ᴶ⟩ [˧˥] (31)
