= Chatinos =

Chatino Chaqᶠ tnyaᴶ
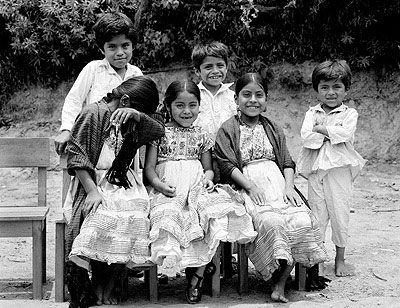
- Chatino children.

Total population
- ~23,000 (Mexico)

Regions with significant populations
- Mexico (Oaxaca)

Languages
- Chatino, Spanish, San Juan Quiahije Chatino Sign Language

Religion
- predominantly Roman Catholic

Related ethnic groups
- Zapotec

The Chatinos are an Indigenous people of Mexico. Chatino communities are located in the southeastern region of the state of Oaxaca in southern central Mexico. Their native Chatino languages are spoken by about 23,000 people (Ethnologue surveys), but ethnic Chatinos may number many more. The Chatinos of San Juan Quiahije call themselves neqᴬ tnyaᴶ and their language Chaqᶠ tnyaᴮ.

Chatino populations are found in the following Oaxacan municipalities, mostly in the area around Juquila: Santos Reyes Nopala, San Juan Quiahije or Kichinᴬ kiqyaᶜ, San Miguel Panixtlahuaca or Kchinᴬ Skwiᴱ, Santiago Yaitepec or Keᴳ Xinᴱ, Santa Cruz Zenzontepec or Qyaᶜ ytiᴮ, San Juan Lachao or Tsoᴴ, Santa María Temaxcaltepec or Xyanᴬ, Santa Catarina Juquila or Sqweᶠ and Tataltepec de Valdés or Jloꞌo.

The region that the Chatinos inhabit is rich in natural resources. Traditionally many Chatino people have been involved in agriculture, which depends very much on the climate, so some Chatinos have had to emigrate to the corners of the district of Juquila to work on coffee plantations. Most Chatino communities have public services, and there are runways for airports in many municipalities. Federal bilingual schools, high schools, and telesecundarias (distance education programs for secondary and high school students) have been established.

The traditional authorities of this people are organized in a system based on civil and religious roles, in which advice from elders is treated as the greatest authority. They believe in the Holy Grandmother, the Holy Father Sun, the Holy Mother Earth, and the Holy Mother Moon. In addition, they worship the deities of water, wind, rain, the mountain, and fire.

== Chatino languages ==
Chatino is a family of Indigenous Mesoamerican languages, which is classified under the Zapotecan branch of the Oto-Manguean language family. The Chatino people have close cultural and linguistic ties with the Zapotec peoples, whose Zapotec language form the rest of the Zapotecan branch of the Otomanguean language family.

According to Campbell, there are three main Chatino languages, which exhibit varying degrees of mutual intelligibility: Zenzontepec Chatino, Tataltepec Chatino, and Eastern or Highland Chatino.

Varieties of Eastern or Highland Chatino are the most widely spoken. The Zenzontepec language is also spoken in Tlapanalquiahuitl and Tlacotepec; the Tataltepec language is used only in that municipio.
