= Mixtepec Zapotec (disambiguation) =

Mixtepec Zapotec is an Oto-Manguean language of Oaxaca, Mexico.

Mixtepec Zapotec may also refer to:

- San Agustín Mixtepec Zapotec, a nearly extinct Zapotec language of Oaxaca, Mexico
- Asunción Mixtepec Zapotec, a nearly extinct Oto-Manguean language of western Oaxaca, Mexico
- San Miguel Mixtepec Zapotec, a Zapotec language of Oaxaca, Mexico
- San Mateo Mixtepec Zapotec, a Zapotec language of Oaxaca, Mexico
