= Zapoteco de la Sierra sur, noroeste =

Zapoteco de la Sierra sur, noroeste is a name used by INALI for a variety of Zapotec recognized by the Mexican government. It corresponds to three ISO languages:

- Mixtepec Zapotec (ISO 639-3: zte), spoken in Villa Sola de Vega, Oaxaca
- Zaniza Zapotec (ISO 639-3: zpw), spoken in western Oaxaca
- Elotepec Zapotec (ISO 639-3: zpm), spoken in Oaxaca

== See also ==
- Zapoteco
