= Ozolotepec Zapotec =

Zapotec language of Mexico

- Native to: Mexico
- Region: Oaxaca
- Native speakers: (6,500 cited 1990 census)
- Language family: Oto-Manguean: Zapotecan; Zapotec; Sierra Sur; Miahuatlan; Ozolotepec Zapotec
- Dialects: San Marcial Ozolotepec; San Gregorio Ozolotepec

Language codes
- ISO 639-3: zao
- Glottolog: ozol1235

Ozolotepec Zapotec is a Zapotec language spoken in southern Oaxaca, Mexico. It is partially intelligible with Cuixtla Zapotec and Loxicha Zapotec.

Some towns named Ozolotepec speak Xanaguía Zapotec or Xanica Zapotec.
