= Solteco Zapotec =

Extinct Zapotec language of Mexico

- Native to: Mexico
- Region: Oaxaca
- Era: attested 1886
- Language family: Oto-Manguean (MP): Zapotecan; Zapotec; Solteco Zapotec

Language codes
- ISO 639-3: None (mis)
- Glottolog: None

Solteco Zapotec is an extinct Zapotec language of western Oaxaca, Mexico. It was perhaps the most divergent Zapotec language.

"Solteco" is a generic name used for several varieties of Zapotec.

There are very few written sources for Solteco. The largest record of Solteco is found in the responses to an 1886 vocabulary questionnaire. The questionnaire indicates that the Solteco language was already in disuse, but an unnamed 92-year-old woman from San Ildefonso Sola was able to provide Solteco vocabulary.

== Classification ==
Solteco has consistently been identified as a relative of the Chatino and Zapotec language families, but there is some debate as to where it belongs in the subclassification of Zapotecan: whether Solteco is an independent third branch of Zapotecan, or part of the Zapotec branch, which is the current consensus. Based on some traits shared, including positional restrictions on the historical development affecting labialized velars and the presence of a lateral-initial animacy prefix, Solteco can be considered a member of the Western Zapotec group of languages, which also includes the Zapotec languages of Totomachapan, Lachixío, Mixtepec, and Los Altos.

== Features of Solteco ==
Solteco has only partially participated in the develarization of Proto-Zapotecan labialized velar consonants (*kw, *kkw > *b, *p). Proto-Zapotecan *kw appears in Solteco as /b/ only in initial contexts, and the fortis *kkw remains a labialized velar /kw/.

Proto-Zapotecan laterals appear in Solteco as nasal consonants in words reconstructed with nasal vowels. This is unlike other Zapotec languages, where these laterals are preserved.

Solteco words in the 1886 vocabulary survey sometimes are transcribed with a letter ⟨n⟩ in the middle of words. One researcher has suggested that this ⟨n⟩ may indicate the nasalization of the preceding vowel.
