= San Vicente Zapotec =

Zapotec language of Oaxaca, Mexico

- San Vicente Coatlán Zapotec; Southern Ejutla Zapotec
- Native to: Mexico
- Region: Oaxaca
- Native speakers: 3,400 (2005 census)
- Language family: Oto-Manguean: Zapotecan; Zapotec; Sierra Sur; Miahuatlan; San Baltázar Loxicha; San Vicente Zapotec

Language codes
- ISO 639-3: zpt
- Glottolog: sanv1242
- ELP: San Vicente Coatlán

San Vicente Zapotec (in full San Vicente Coatlán Zapotec, also Southern Ejutla Zapotec), is a Zapotec language spoken in southern Oaxaca, Mexico, in the Ejutla District and San Vicente Coatlán.

It is 75% intelligible with San Baltázar Loxicha Zapotec, and 45% intelligible with Santo Domingo Coatlán Zapotec.

== Phonology ==
=== Vowels ===
	Front	Back
Close	i	u
Mid	e	o
Mid	ɛ	ɔ
Open	a	

=== Consonants ===
		Labial	Dental	Alveolar	Retroflex	Palatal	Velar	Labio- velar
Plosive		p	t̪			tʲ	k	kʷ
Affricate				ts	tʂ			
Fricative	voiceless	(f)	θ	s	ʂ		x	
Fricative	voiced	β	ð	z	ʐ		ɣ	
Nasal		m		n		ɲ	ŋ	
Rhotic				r				
Lateral					ɭ			
Approximant		w				j		
