= Mitla Zapotec =

Oto-Manguean language of Oaxaca, Mexico

- (San Pablo Villa de Mitla)
- Didxsaj
- Pronunciation: [didʒˈsaʰ]
- Native to: Mexico
- Region: Mitla Valley, Oaxaca
- Native speakers: (20,000 cited 1983)
- Language family: Oto-Manguean: Zapotecan; Zapotec; Central; Mitla Zapotec

Language codes
- ISO 639-3: zaw
- Glottolog: mitl1236

Mitla Zapotec, or Didxsaj, is an Oto-Manguean language of Oaxaca, Mexico.

Guelavia Zapotec is reported to be 75% intelligible, but the reverse is apparently not the case.

== Phonetics, phonology, and orthography ==
Mitla Zapotec has the following consonants:

- Fortis: p, t, k, k^{w}, s, ʃ, m:, n:, l:
- Lenis: b, d, g, g^{w}, z, ʒ, m, n, l
- Neutral: ɾ [flap r], r [trill r], f, x, ʔ, h, w, y.

/f/ is rare in native words.

- Mitla Zapotec has six vowels: /a, æ, e, i, o, u/. The vowel /æ/ is written ⟨ä⟩ in the practical orthography.

Vowels contrast in phonation, with a difference between modal phonation, breathy phonation, and creaky phonation. For example

- gihts [gi̤ts] 'paper'
- be'ts [bḛts] 'louse'

== Noun morphology ==
Mitla Zapotec has little noun morphology. Pluralization is indicated by a plural proclitic /re=/, as in the following example

re=guejdx
[re=ge̤dʒ]
PL=village
'villages'

Alienably possessed nouns have a prefix ʃ- (spelled ⟨x⟩ in the popular orthography), as in the following examples (cited first in practical orthography, then in IPA).

x-cojb Maria
[ʃ-ko̤b maria]
POSS-dough Maria
'Maria's dough'

x-cu'n=reni
[ʃ-kuʔn=ɾeni]
POSS-tortilla=3pl
'their tortillas'

== Verb morphology ==
=== Aspectual morphology ===
Briggs analyses Mitla Zapotec as having six aspects, each of which has an ablative ('go and V') and non-ablative variant. They are

1. continuative, e.g., ka' 'to take' ka-ká'-ni 'he continually takes'
2. habitual, e.g., wi 'to see' r-wi-ni 'he habitually sees'
3. completive, e.g., sloh 'to begin' gu-sloh-ni 'he began'
4. potential, e.g., sæu 'to close' gu-su-ni-ni 'he is going to close it'
5. unfulfilled, e.g., llux 'to finish' nu-llûx-ni 'he didn't finish'
6. incomplete, e.g., re 'to invite' zu-re-ni 'he will invite'

The following example shows the aspectual inflection of three verbs in Mitla Zapotec.

habitual	unreal	continuative	potential	definite future	completive	
/ɾ-baʰnː/	/ni-baʰnː/	/ka-baʰnː/	/gi-baʰnː/	/si-baʰnː/	/bi-baʰnː/	' wake up'
/ɾ-aʰdʒ/	/nj-aʰdʒ/	/kaj-aʰdʒ/	/g-adʒ/	/s-aʰdʒ/	/guʰdʒ/	' get wet'
/ɾ-uʰn/	/nj-uʰn/	/kaj-uʰn/	/g-uʰn/	/s-uʰn/	/b-eʰn/	' do, make'

=== Person marking ===
Person marking is shown with a set of post-verbal clitics, which are used for both subjects and objects

		singular	plural
1st person		=ǽ	=nú
2nd person		=lu	=tú
3rd person	ordinary	=ni	=reni
3rd person	respect	=bá	=reni
3rd person	male to male	=xí	=reni

The following examples show examples of verbs with aspect and person marking

Gu-kwaʔts=ǽ=lu
POT-hide=1sg=2sg
'I am going to hide you.'

Ba-saʔN=ǽ=tú
COMPL-leave=1sg=2pl
'I left you (pl).'

== Syntax ==
The most basic word order is VSO. However, SVO also occurs, especially with a topicalized subject.

Zä nigui=re
go man=this
'This man went away'

Narä r-hui=ä́ la'tu
I HAB-see=1sg 2pl
'I see you (pl).'

R-ahp byûz llîbr
HAB-have child book
'The child has a book'
