= Mazaltepec Zapotec =

Oto-Manguean language of Oaxaca, Mexico

- (Santo Tomás Mazaltepec)
- Native to: Mexico
- Region: Oaxaca
- Native speakers: (2,200 cited 1990 census)
- Language family: Oto-Manguean: Zapotecan; Zapotec; Mazaltepec Zapotec

Language codes
- ISO 639-3: zpy
- Glottolog: maza1294
- ELP: Etla

Mazaltepec Zapotec, also known as Etla Zapotec, is a divergent Zapotec language of the Mexican state of Oaxaca. It stands apart from other varieties of Zapotec; it has only 10% intelligibility with San Juan Guelavía Zapotec (at least with some varieties, as that may not be a single language), but zero intelligibility with other varieties of Zapotec that have been tested. The moribund Tejalapan Zapotec may be closer.
