= Isthmus Zapotec =

Language

- Juchitán Zapotec
- diidxazá
- Pronunciation: [dìdʒàˈzà]
- Region: Oaxaca, Mexico
- Native speakers: (85,000 cited 1990 census)
- Language family: Oto-Manguean: Zapotecan; Zapotec; Central; Extended Ocotepec; Isthmus Zapotec
- Writing system: Latin

Language codes
- ISO 639-3: zai
- Glottolog: isth1244
- ELP: Isthmus Zapotec
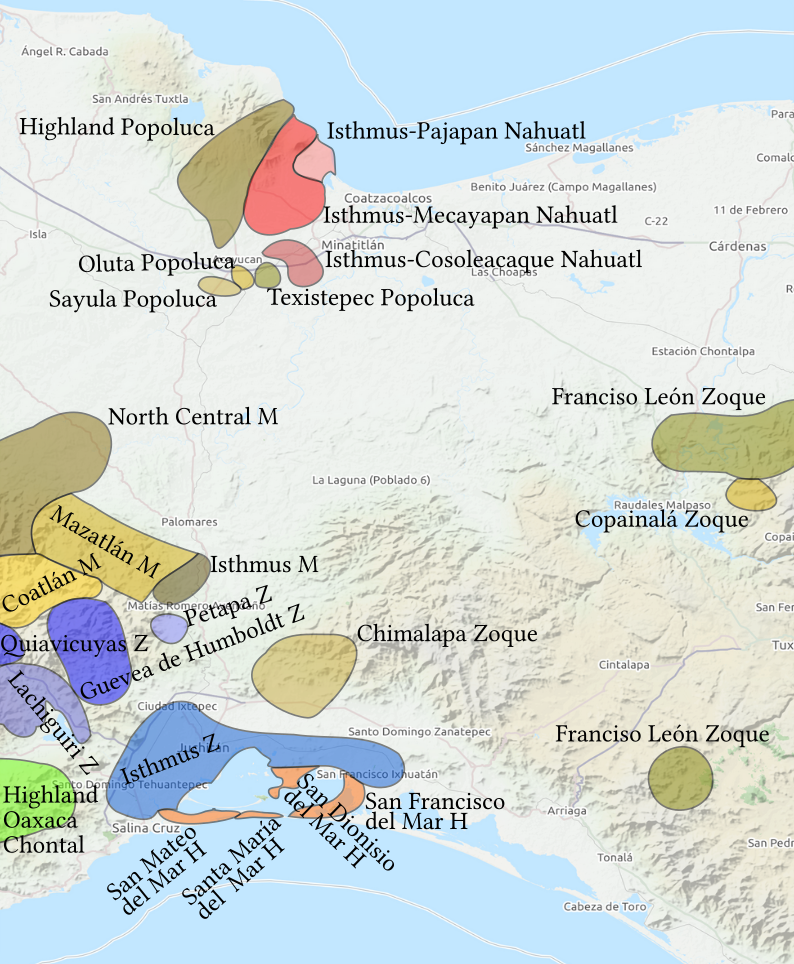
- Location of Isthmus Zapotec (blue) on the Southern Coast

Isthmus Zapotec, also known as Juchitán Zapotec (native name diidxazá; Spanish: Zapoteco del Istmo), is a Zapotec language spoken in Tehuantepec and Juchitán de Zaragoza, in the Mexican state of Oaxaca. According to the census of 1990 it has about 85,000 native speakers, however this number is rapidly decreasing, as speakers shift to Spanish.

Guevea de Humboldt Zapotec, a different language, is sometimes referred to as "Northern Isthmus Zapotec."

Since the Ley General de Derechos Lingüísticos de los Pueblos Indígenas was passed in 2003 Isthmus Zapotec, along with all other indigenous languages of Mexico, was officially recognised by the Mexican State.

== Phonology ==
The consonants of Isthmus Zapotec are shown below. There are two types of consonants: strong and weak. Strong and weak consonants are called Fortis and Lenis. Fortis voiceless consonants that are represented by double letter for example: nn symbolizes the fortis of /n/. Fortis consonants are also longer than lenis consonants.

=== Consonants ===
The consonants for Isthmus Zapotec are as follows:

| | | Labial | Alveolar | Palatal | Velar |
|---|---|---|---|---|---|
| Nasal | | m ⟨m⟩ | n ⟨n⟩ | ɲ ⟨ñ⟩ | |
| Plosive/ Affricate | voiceless | p ⟨p⟩ | t ⟨t⟩ | tʃ ⟨ch⟩ | k ⟨c⟩ (Note: When a /k/ sound occurs before "e" or "i", it is spelled ⟨qu⟩.) |
| Plosive/ Affricate | voiced | b ⟨b⟩ | d ⟨d⟩ | dʒ ⟨dx⟩ | g ⟨g⟩ (Note: When a /g/ sound occurs before "e" or "i", it is spelled ⟨gu⟩. Also, the sound /gw/ is written ⟨gü⟩.) |
| Fricative | voiceless | | s ⟨s⟩ | ʃ ⟨xh⟩ (Note: Except before another consonant when it is written as ⟨x⟩.) | |
| Fricative | voiced | | z ⟨z⟩ | ʒ ⟨x⟩ | |
| Approximant | | | l ⟨l⟩ | j ⟨y⟩ | w ⟨hu⟩ |
| Vibrant | trill | (ʙ) ⟨bŕ⟩ | r ⟨r̠⟩ | | |
| Vibrant | tap | | ɾ ⟨r⟩ | | |

This sound "bŕ" occurs very rarely for a bilabial trill [ʙ]. It occurs in words like "berenbŕ".

A couple consonant sounds may also be geminated (ex.; /l/ ~ /lː/, /n/ ~ /nː/).

=== Vowels ===
Isthmus Zapotec has five vowels (a, e, i, o, u). These occur in the three phonation types of stressed syllables: modal, checked, and laryngealized.

Checked vowels sound as if they end in glottal stop; for example words such as in English "what, light take, put." The glottal stop is a vowel feature. Checked vowels can also be a slightly laryngealized during a glottal closure.

Laryngealized vowels are longer and pronounced with a creaky voice. Sometimes they are pronounced with a clear pronunciation of the vowel after a soft glottal stop. There are no breathy vowels in Zapotec.

| | | Front | Back |
|---|---|---|---|
| Close | modal | i | u |
| Close | checked | iʼ | uʼ |
| Close | laryngealized | ḭ | ṵ |
| Mid | modal | e | o |
| Mid | checked | eʼ | oʼ |
| Mid | laryngealized | ḛ | o̰ |
| Open | modal | a | |
| Open | checked | aʼ | |
| Open | laryngealized | a̰ | |

== Morphology ==
The verb structure for the Isthmus Zapotec is as follows: ASPECT (THEME) (CAUSATIVE) ROOT VOWEL. The verbs of Isthmus Zapotec usually contain around seven aspects. Research conducted by Stephen A. Marlett and Velma B. Pickett suggests "that for some verbs the completive and potential aspect prefixes are added at an earlier stratum than for most verbs". In Isthmus Zapotec, the four main causative prefixes are added /k-/, /si-/, /z-/, and /Ø-/ and at times, two of them can be found in a verb. E.g. /si-k-/. The prefix /u-/ allows for the addition of the word "make" into the word "quiet" as in u-si-ganî, meaning "make quiet". The Isthmus Zapotec refer to themselves by using the first person inclusive pronoun.

Simple (monomorphemic) verb stem plus particle
| Isthmus Zapotec | English |
|---|---|
| -eʔeda | come |
| neé | and or with |
| -eʔeda-neé | bring |
| b-eʔeda-neé-bé (nií) | he brought (it) |
| ru-uni-neé-bé (ní naʔa) | he does (it) with (me) |

Simple verb stem plus noun stem
| Isthmus Zapotec | English |
|---|---|
| -naaba | ask |
| diʔidžaʔ | word |
| -naaba-diʔidžaʔ | ask a question |
| gu-naaba-diʔidža (hnyoʔoúʔ) | ask your mother |

In Isthmus Zapotec, the verb stems can be single morphemes or they can also be compounds of two morphemes. There are three compound stems, the first two are highlighted by the above two charts. In the first chart, -eʔeda translates to 'come' and nee translates to 'and or with' with morphemes added in the beginning and at the end of the word, altering its overall meaning. They are simple (monomorphemic) verb stem plus particle. In the second chart, -naabatranslates to 'ask' while diʔidžaʔ translates to 'word' which are simple verb stem plus noun stem. The third compound is a simple verb stem plus noun stem where -aaka and -unni are the verb stem. The verb stem -aaka translates to 'happen or come to pass' while -unni translates to 'do'. Any Spanish infinitive is theoretically a second component in the compound. Spanish words are also incorporated with Isthmus Zapotec morphemes such as r-aaka-retratar-beé meaning 'he gets his picture taken' where the Spanish word retratar has Isthmus Zapotec morphemes at the beginning and at the end. The charts below are the classes of morphemes in Isthmus Zapotec:

=== Classes of Morphemes in Isthmus Zapotec ===
Various Verbal Affixes in Isthmus Zapotec
| Isthmus Zapotec | Name Forms |
|---|---|
| {si-} | causative |
| {na-} | stative |
| {gu-} | potential |
| {wa-} | perfective |
| {zu-} | incompletive |
| {bi-} | completive; singular imperative |
| {ru-} | habitual |
| {nu-} | unreal |
| {ku-} | continuative |
| {na-} | movement |
| {tše-} | movement-intention, present |
| {ze-} | movement-intention, future |
| {ye-} | movement-intention, completive |
| {zé-} | movement-intention, incompletive |
| {la-} | plural imperative |
| {ké-} | negative |
| {kádi-} | negative |
| {-di} | negative |
| {-sii} | as soon as |
| {-šaʔataʔ} | too much |
| {-ru} | still, yet |
| {-gaa} | meanwhile |
| {-peʔ} | emphasizer |
| {-ka} | right away |
| {-ža} | reverser |
| {-saʔa} | reciprocal |

Subjects in Isthmus Zapotec
| Isthmus Zapotec | Name Forms |
|---|---|
| {ka-} | plural of subject (to nouns) |
| {-éʔ} | first person singular |
| {-luʔ} | second person singular |
| {-beé} | third person singular, humans |
| {-meé} | third person singular, animals |
| {-nií} | third person singular, inanimate |
| {-ʔ} | third person singular, known subject |
| {-nuú} | first person plural inclusive |
| {-duú} | first person plural exclusive |
| {-tuú} | second person plural |

An example for the morpheme {-ka}, attaching it to an Isthmus Zapotec word will make the word plural. The Isthmus Zapotec word zigi (chin) when {-ka} is added as a prefix will become kazigi (chins). Zike (shoulder) will become kazike (shoulders) and diaga (ear) will become kadiaga (ears).

Word Interrogation in Isthmus Zapotec
| Isthmus Zapotec | Name Forms |
|---|---|
| {-lá} | yes-or-no questions |
| {-yaʔ} | questions other than yes-or-no |
| {nyeʔe-} | yes-or-no questions; occurs only with -lá |

Yes/no question particles In Isthmus Zapotec are not mandatory, however, the question particle [lá?] is required in these form of questions.

Tense-Aspect-Mood (TAM) Prefixes
| Prefix | TAM |
| ri-, ru- | Habitual |
| bi-, gu- | Completive |
| ca-, cu- | Progressive |
| za-, zu- | Irrealis |
| ni-, nu-, ñ- | Potential |
| hua- | Perfect |
| na- | Stative |

Demonstratives in Isthmus Zapotec
| ri' | proximal (objects near the speaker) |
| ca | mesioproximal (objects near the addressee) |
| rica' | mesiodistal (objects away but near from both speaker and addressee) |
| que | distal (objects far away from both speaker and addressee) |

Pronominal System in Isthmus Zapotec
| Categorization | Dependent Form | Independent Form |
|---|---|---|
| 1st person singular | -a' | naa |
| 2nd person singular | -lu' | lii |
| 1st person plural inclusive | -nu | laa-nu |
| 1st person plural exclusive | -du | laa-du |
| 2nd person plural | -tu | laa-tu |

=== Syllable structure ===
Isthmus Zapotec has mainly open syllables.

== Poems ==
This poem Bidxi was written by Victor Terán and translated into English by David Shook
| Original Isthmus Zapotec | Bridge Translation | English Translation |
|---|---|---|
| Bidxi | Toad | Frog |
| Cachesa, cachesa ti bidxi' ludoo ti bidxi' ruaangola ti bidxi' nambó' Latá', lataguuya' lataguuya oh, ti bidxi' luyaandi cachese ludoo. | Jumps, that it jumps a toad on the cord thick-lipped toad pot-bellied toad Come, come, come to see come, come, come to see a toad with bug-eyes that jumps in a straight line | Jump! Jump! Frog skip the rope Wide-mouth frog Pot-bellied frog Come, come and see Come and see – look Bug-eyed frog Jump skip the rope |
