= Coatecas Altas Zapotec =

Zapotec language of Oaxaca, Mexico

- (Coatecas Altas, Oaxaca)
- Native to: Mexico
- Region: Oaxaca
- Native speakers: 4,900 (2005 census)
- Language family: Oto-Manguean: Zapotecan; Zapotec; Sierra Sur; Miahuatlan; Coatecas Altas Zapotec

Language codes
- ISO 639-3: zca
- Glottolog: coat1244
- ELP: Amatec Zapotec (shared)

Coatecas Altas Zapotec is a Zapotec language spoken in southern Oaxaca, Mexico, in and around the town of Coatecas Altas, in the Ejutla District, south of Oaxaca City. It is 83% intelligible with Ozolotepec Zapotec, and similar to Miahuatlán Zapotec.

Communities of Coatecas Altas speakers can also be found in Soconusco, Chiapas, San Bernardino, Oaxaca, and in the areas surrounding San Quintín, Baja California.
