= Lachixío =

Lachixío may refer to:

- Lachixío Zapotec, Zapotec language of Oaxaca, Mexico
- San Vicente Lachixío, town and municipality in Oaxaca
- Santa María Lachixío, town and municipality in Oaxaca
