= Texmelucan Zapotec =

Oto-Manguean language of Oaxaca, Mexico

- (San Lorenzo Texmelucan); Central Sola de Vega Zapotec; Papabuco
- Native to: Mexico
- Region: Oaxaca
- Native speakers: (4,600 cited 2000)
- Language family: Oto-Manguean: Zapotecan; Zapotec; Papabuco; Texmelucan Zapotec

Language codes
- ISO 639-3: zpz
- Glottolog: texm1235
- ELP: Texmelucan Zapotec

Texmelucan Zapotec (Central Sola de Vega Zapotec) is an Oto-Manguean language of the San Lorenzo Texmelucan Municipality in western Oaxaca, Mexico (settlements of Benito Juárez, Ciénega del Río, El Arador, El Carrizal, El Ojo de Agua, El Palo de Lima, El Papayo (Río Papayo), El Ratón, El Suchil, Feliciano Martínez, La Calandria, Llano Verde, Llano Verde, Los Sabinos, Manantial de Agua, Naranjales, Piedra Blanca, Piedra de la Señora, Pueblo Nuevo, Rincón de Talea, Río Limar, Río Nube (El Platanar), Río Pescadito, Río Tambor, Río Tigre, Río de Talea, San José, Barrio de Totopostle, and San Lorenzo Texmelucan). It is a divergent Zapotec language, having only 10% intelligibility with its closest relative, Zaniza Zapotec. Both go by the name Papabuco.

== Phonology ==
Texmelucan Zapotec has been analyzed with twenty-five consonants /p, b, t, d, k, ky, kw, g, gy, gw, č, ǰ, s, z, š, ž, f, m, n, ñ, ŋ, l, ly, r, h/ (as seen in the chart below) and five vowels /i, e, a, o, u/. Interpreted IPA values are given in square brackets. Vowels may be oral or nasal, and may be plain, laryngealized (written as a doubled vowel), or glottalized (Vʔ).

Texmelucan Zapotec Consonants
		Labial	Dental	Alveo- palatal	Palatal	Velar		Glottal
		Labial	Dental	Alveo- palatal	Palatal	plain	labialized	Glottal
Plosive/ Affricate	voiceless	p	t	tʃ ⟨č⟩	c ⟨ky⟩	k	kʷ ⟨kw⟩	
Plosive/ Affricate	voiced	b	d	dʒ ⟨ǰ⟩	ɟ ⟨gy⟩	g	gʷ ⟨gw⟩	
Fricative	voiceless	f	s	ʃ ⟨š⟩				h
Fricative	voiced		z	ʒ ⟨ž⟩				
Nasal		m	n		ɲ ⟨ñ⟩	ŋ		
Lateral			l		ʎ ⟨ly⟩			
Flap			ɾ					

Syllables may begin with up to two consonants and closed by up to one consonant.

Texmelucan Zapotec has four phonemic tones: high, falling, mid and low. On non-modal vowels, the number of possible tones is reduced: only mid and low tones are found on laryngealized vowels and only high and low tones are found on glottalized (or checked) syllables.

== Semantics ==
The semantics of the verbs 'go', 'come' and 'arrive' in Texmelucan Zapotec, as in other Zapotecan languages, relies on the notion of a deictic base. Each one of these words may be translated by one of a pair of verbs in Texmelucan Zapotec that differ based on whether the motion is toward or away from a deictic base. The deictic base is "the place where the person in motion normally or expectedly returns", and when mentioned by Texmelucan Zapotec speakers, places like "my country", the town of San Lorenzo Texmelucan, and one's house are always treated as the deictic base. The table below summarizes the features of these six verbs. The cited forms are in the completive aspect and have a third-person masculine subject.

Semantics of 'go', 'come', and 'arrive' in Texmelucan Zapotec
	Verb	motion ___ location of speech act	motion ___ deictic base
go_{1}	byay	from	towards
go_{2}	gway	from	away from
come_{1}	byeed yu	towards	towards
come_{2}	biid yu	towards	away from
arrive_{1}	briy	(one-way motion irrespective of source)	towards
arrive_{2}	bruʔnyay	(one-way motion irrespective of source)	away from
