= Quiegolani Zapotec =

Zapotec language of Oaxaca, Mexico

- (Santa María Quiegolani)
- Native to: Mexico
- Region: Oaxaca
- Native speakers: (2,000 cited 2000 census)
- Language family: Oto-Manguean: Zapotecan; Zapotec; Sierra Sur; Cis-Yautepec; Quiegolani Zapotec

Language codes
- ISO 639-3: zpi
- Glottolog: sant1451

Quiegolani Zapotec (Western Yautepec Zapotec) is a Zapotec language of Oaxaca, Mexico.

== See also ==
- Santa María Quiegolani

== Bibliography ==
- Black, Cheryl A. (2000), Quiegolani Zapotec Syntax: A Principles and Parameters Account, SIL International, ISBN 978-1556710995
