= ZPP =

ZPP may refer to:

- ZPP (complexity), a complexity class in computational complexity theory
- Zinc protoporphyrin
- zirconium-potassium perchlorate, a pyrotechnic composition
- Związek Patriotów Polskich, a Polish communist political party
- Zero-product property, a mathematical propety of multiplication.

zpp may refer to:

- ISO 639:zpp, ISO 639-3 code for El Alto Zapotec
