= Lachiguiri =

Lachiguirí may refer to:

- San José Lachiguirí, Oaxaca
- Santiago Lachiguiri, Oaxaca
- Lachiguiri Zapotec language
