= ZPF =

ZPF may refer to:

- Quiatoni Zapotec, a Zapotec language of Mexico
- Waco ZPF, an American biplane
- Zero-point field
