= Felipe López (author) =

Zapotec author)

Felipe H. Lopez
- Born: San Lucas Quiaviní, Oaxaca, Mexico
- Writing career
- Language: Zapotec, Spanish
- Genre: Poetry
- Notable awards: 2017 Premios CaSa for the creation of Zapotec literature

Felipe H. Lopez is a Zapotec-language scholar and writer.

== Life ==
Lopez was born in the town of San Lucas Quiaviní, Oaxaca in Mexico. At the age 16, he migrated to Los Angeles, California, speaking no English and little Spanish. Later, he obtained a Ph.D. from the University of California, Los Angeles in Urban planning, and currently he is a faculty member at Seton Hall University. He has published poetry, academic articles, and Zapotec-language learning materials. In 2021, he had an appearance in Netflix's animated series City of Ghosts, where he represented himself, a Zapotec-language professor.

== Works ==
- Munro, Pamela & Felipe H. Lopez et al. Di'csyonaary x:tèe'n dìi'zh sah Sann Lu'uc = San Lucas Quiaviní Zapotec dictionary. Los Angeles : UCLA Chicano Studies Research Center Publications, 1999.
- Lopez, Felipe H. 2020. "Recovering Knowledge through Forgotten Words." Global SL (blog), Campus Compact, July 17, 2020.
- Lopez, Felipe H., Luis Escala-Rabadan, and Raul Hinojosa. 2001. "Migrant Associations, Remittances, and Regional Development between Los Angeles and Oaxaca, Mexico." UCLA NAID.
- Lopez, Felipe H., and David Runsten. 2004. "Mixtecs and Zapotecs Working in California: Rural and Urban Experiences." In Indigenous Mexican Migrants in the United States, edited by Jonathan Fox and Gaspar Rivera-Salgado, 249-78. San Diego: Center for U.S.-Mexican Studies, UCSD/Center for Comparative Immigration Studies, UCSD.
- Lopez, Felipe H. 2017. Mam and Guepy: Two Valley Zapotec Poems. Latin America Literary Review Vol. 44 (88): 83-84. Online: https://www.lalrp.net/articles/abstract/22/.
- Lopez, Felipe H. 2018. "Seven Poems." Latin American Literature Today 1(7). Online: https://www.latinamericanliteraturetoday.org/en/2018/august/seven-poems-felipe-h-lopez.
- Lopez, Felipe H. 2018. Liaza chaa ‘I’m going home’. Latin American Literature Today 1(7). Online: https://www.latinamericanliteraturetoday.org/en/2018/august/liaza-chaa-im-going-home-felipe-h-lopez.
- Lopez, Felipe H. 2018. "Gyec Muly – The Money Cage – La jaula de dinero." The Acentos Review. Online: https://www.acentosreview.com/may2018/felipe-h-lopez-and-brook.html.
- Lopez, Felipe H., Brook Danielle Lillehaugen, & Pamela Munro, with Savita M. Deo, Graham Mauro, & Saúl Ontiveros. 2019. San Lucas Quiaviní Zapotec Talking Dictionary, version 2.0. Living Tongues Institute for Endangered Languages. http://www.talkingdictionary.org/sanlucasquiavini.
- Lopez, Felipe H. 2021. Reclaiming our Languages. In Flores-Marcial et al. (eds), Caseidyneën Saën–Learning Together: Colonial Valley Zapotec Teaching Materials. Online: http://ds-wordpress.haverford.edu/ticha-resources/modules/chapter/reclaiming-our-languages/.
- Lopez, Felipe H. 2022. "3 Poems - Rla dizh / Xjaa / Lo nez Santa Mony." Latin@ Literatures: A Cultural and Literary Journal (3). Online: https://www.latinoliteratures.org/archives/935.
- Munro, Pamela, Brook Danielle Lillehaugen, Felipe H. Lopez, Brynn Paul, and Lillian Leibovich. 2022. Cali Chiu? A Course in Valley Zapotec, 3rd edition. Haverford: Haverford College Libraries Open Educational Resources. Online: https://oer.haverford.edu/cali-chiu/.
