= Rincón Zapotec =

Zapotecan language spoken in Mexico

- Didza Xidza
- Native to: Mexico
- Region: northern Oaxaca
- Native speakers: (41,000 cited 1990–2000)
- Language family: Oto-Manguean: Zapotecan; Zapotec; Sierra Norte; Rincon; Rincón Zapotec

Language codes
- ISO 639-3: Variously: zar – Rincón zsr – Southern Rincón zcd – Las Delicias
- Glottolog: rinc1236
- ELP: Rincón

Rincón Zapotec (Northern Villa Alta Zapotec, Nexitzo) is a Zapotec language of Oaxaca, Mexico.

Temaxcalapan dialect may be distinct enough to be considered a separate language. The next closest language is Choápam Zapotec, with 65% intelligibility.

Las Delicias and Yagallo have approximately 75% similarity.

== Phonology ==
=== Vowels ===
	Front	Central	Back
Close	i	ɨ	u
Mid	e		o
Open	æ	a	

=== Consonants ===
		Bilabial	Alveolar	Palatal	Velar	Glottal
Plosive	voiceless	p	t		k	ʔ
Plosive	voiced	b	d		ɡ	ʔ
Affricate	voiceless		ts	tʃ		
Affricate	voiced		dz	dʒ		
Fricative	voiceless		s	ʃ	x	
Fricative	voiced		z	ʒ		
Nasal			n			
Rhotic			ɾ			
Approximant			l	j		

Sounds such as /f k ʎ m ɲ r v w/ only occur in loanwords from Spanish. A double consonant ll occurs as a geminated /lː/ rather than a palatalized ll from Spanish.
