= Petapa Zapotec =

Zapotecan language of the isthmus of Mexico

- (Santa María Petapa)
- Native to: Mexico
- Region: Oaxaca
- Native speakers: (8,000 cited 1990 census)
- Language family: Oto-Manguean: Zapotecan; Zapotec; Central; Trans-Yautepec; Petapa Zapotec

Language codes
- ISO 639-3: zpe
- Glottolog: peta1247
- ELP: Petapa Zapotec

Petapa Zapotec (Zapoteco de Santa María Petapa) is a Zapotecan language of the isthmus of Mexico.
