= WTZ =

WTZ may refer to:

- William T. Zenor (1846–1916), United States Representative from Indiana
- Western Tlacolula Zapotec
