= Santa María Quiegolani =

- Municipality and town
- Location in Mexico
- Coordinates: 16°16′N 96°03′W
- Country: Mexico
- State: Oaxaca

Area
  - Total: 122.48 km^{2} (47.29 sq mi)
- Elevation: 2,160 m (7,090 ft)

Population (2010) Municipality
  - Total: 1,770
- Time zone: UTC-6 (Central Standard Time)

Santa María Quiegolani is a town and municipality in Oaxaca in south-western Mexico. It is part of the Yautepec District in the east of the Sierra Sur Region.

== Name ==
The name is derived from Zapotec meaning "ancient rock" (according to a native Zapotec speaker from the town), "carved rock" or possibly "within the river".

== Geography ==
The municipality covers an area of 122.48 km^{2} at an elevation of 2,160 meters above sea level in the Sierra Madre del Sur mountains. The climate is mild and humid.

=== Flora and fauna ===
Trees include pine, oak, mahogany, cedar, ash, Tepehuaje, guanacastle, cuachipilin, Nopo and pochote. Mango, plum, avocado, sapodilla, mamey, peach, granaditas, plum, orange and lemon grow in the area.

Wild animals include fox, coyote, cougar, deer, squirrel, badger, armadillo, ocelot, lion, raccoon, opossum, skunk, chupamiel, boar and tepexcuintle. There are iguana, lizard, chintete, turtle, rattlesnake, coral snake and boa.

== Demography ==
As of 2005, the municipality had 317 households with a total population of 1,537 of whom 1,240 spoke an indigenous language. The main economic activity is agriculture, growing maize, sorghum, peanuts and other crops such as beans, coffee and various fruits. About 30% of households raise pigs or goats. Hunting and fishing are practiced for self consumption. There is some logging of maguey and timber.

== See also ==
- Quiegolani Zapotec
