= Antequera Zapotec =

16th-century Zapotec dialect of Mexico

- Native to: Mexico
- Region: Oaxaca
- Era: 16th century
- Language family: Oto-Manguean: Zapotecan; Zapotec; Central; Trans-Yautepec; Antequera Zapotec

Language codes
- ISO 639-3: None (mis)
- Glottolog: None

Antequera Zapotec is the dialect of Zapotec of 16th-century colonial documents such as Córdova 1578 (Smith Stark 2007).

"Antequera" is an old name for the city of Oaxaca.
