= Abejones Zapotec =

Zapotec language of Oaxaca, Mexico

- Native to: Mexico
- Region: Abejones, Oaxaca
- Language family: Oto-Manguean: Zapotecan; Zapotec; Sierra Norte; Sierra Juárez; Abejones Zapotec

Language codes
- ISO 639-3: None (mis)
- Glottolog: None

Abejones Zapotec is a Zapotec language of Oaxaca, Mexico.
