= Asunción Mixtepec Zapotec =

Oto-Manguean language of Oaxaca, Mexico

- Native to: Mexico
- Region: Oaxaca
- Native speakers: (100 cited 1990 census)
- Language family: Oto-Manguean: Zapotecan; Zapotec; Central Zapotec?; Valley?; Asunción Mixtepec Zapotec

Language codes
- ISO 639-3: zoo
- Glottolog: asun1236
- ELP: Asunción Mixtepec Zapotec

Asunción Mixtepec Zapotec (North Central Zimatlan Zapotec) is a nearly extinct Oto-Manguean language of western Oaxaca, Mexico. It is a divergent Zapotec language, 22% intelligible with Ayoquesco Zapotec, the most similar other language.
