= Tabaá Zapotec =

Zapotec language of Mexico

- Native to: Mexico
- Region: Oaxaca
- Native speakers: (2,000 cited 1992)
- Language family: Oto-Manguean: Zapotecan; Zapotec; Sierra Norte; Zoogochoan; Tabaá Zapotec

Language codes
- ISO 639-3: zat
- Glottolog: taba1268
- ELP: Villalta (shared)

Tabaá Zapotec (Central Villa Alta Zapotec) is a Zapotec language of San Juan Tabaá, Oaxaca, Mexico.
