= ZPB =

ZPB or zpb may refer to:

- Sachigo Lake Airport (IATA: ZPB), an airport in Sachigo Lake First Nation, Ontario, Canada
- San Bartolo Yautepec Zapotec (ISO 639-3: zpb), an Oto-Manguean language of western Oaxaca, Mexico
