= Quioquitani Zapotec =

Zapotec language of Oaxaca, Mexico

- (Santa Catarina Quioquitani)
- Quierí Zapotec; Tiits Së
- Pronunciation: [tiˤts sæ]
- Native to: Mexico
- Region: Oaxaca
- Native speakers: (4,000 cited 1991)
- Language family: Oto-Manguean: Zapotecan; Zapotec; Sierra Sur; Yautepec; Quioquitani Zapotec

Language codes
- ISO 639-3: ztq
- Glottolog: quio1241

Quioquitani Zapotec, or Quioquitani-Quierí Zapotec (Zapoteco de Quioquitani y Quierí), natively Tiits Së, is a Zapotec language of Oaxaca, Mexico.

San Pedro Leapi Zapotec is divergent, and perhaps a separate language.
