= Chichicápam Zapotec =

Zapotec language of Oaxaca, Mexico

Chichicapan Zapotec
- (San Baltazar Chichicápam)
- Native to: Mexico
- Region: Oaxaca
- Native speakers: 2,700 (2005)
- Language family: Oto-Manguean: Zapotecan; Zapotec; Central; Valley; Chichicapan Zapotec

Language codes
- ISO 639-3: zpv
- Glottolog: chic1274

Chichicapan Zapotec (Eastern Ocotlán Zapotec, Zapoteco de San Baltazar Chichicápam) is a Zapotec language of Oaxaca, Mexico. The town's name is spelled as both Chichicápam and Chichicapan.

== Bibliography ==
- Benton, Joseph. 1986. "El Cuento del Viejo Abuelo." Revista del Mundo 1.14-31. México, D.F.
- Benton, Joseph P. 1997. "Aspect shift in Chichicapan Zapotec narrative discourse." (Cambio de aspecto en los discursos narrativos del zapoteco de Chichicápam.) SIL Mexico Workpapers 12:34-46.
- Benton, Joseph P. 1987. "Clause and sentence-level word order and discourse strategy in Chichicapan Zapotec oral narrative discourse." (El orden de las palabras a nivel de cláusula y de oración en los discursos narrativos del zapoteco de Chichicapan.) SIL Mexico Workpapers 9.72-84.
- Benton, Joseph P., Andy Black, and Barbara Glaser. 1997. "Modeling Chichicapan Zapotec morphology." (La modelación de la morfología del zapoteco de Chichicápam.) SIL Mexico Workpapers 12.11-33.
- Benton, Joseph P. 1981. "The completive and potential form of Chichicapan Zapotec verbs." SIL UND Workpapers 25.11-30.
- Benton, Joseph Phelps. 1992. Chichicapan Zapotec Communication Styles and World View. M.A. Thesis, Pasadena, CA: Fuller Theological Seminary.
