= ZTE (disambiguation) =

ZTE is a Chinese telecommunication equipment company.

ZTE may also refer to:

- Zalaegerszegi TE, a once-time champion Hungarian football team
- ISO 639:zte, a code referring to the Zapotec languages
- Zero thermal expansion, a property of materials that do not expand when being heated
