= Villa Sola de Vega =

- Municipality and town
- Location of the municipality in Oaxaca

- Location in Mexico
- Coordinates: 16°30′45″N 96°58′50″W
- Country: Mexico
- State: Oaxaca

Area
  - Total: 976.288 km^{2} (376.947 sq mi)

Population (2010)
  - Total: 12,525
  - Density: 12.829/km^{2} (33.227/sq mi)
- Time zone: UTC-6 (Central Standard Time)

Villa Sola de Vega is a town and municipality in Oaxaca in south-western Mexico, part of the Sola de Vega District in the Sierra Sur Region. The meaning "Place of quails" comes from "zollin": quail and "tlán": place of.

== Geography ==
The municipality covers an area of 680 km^{2} (260 mi^{2}). The municipal seat is at an elevation of 1,440 m (4,720 ft). Average temperature is 18 °C (64 °F) and average rainfall is 950ml per year. The Sola River runs through the municipality, a tributary of the Atoyac River.

=== Flora and fauna ===
The terrain is rugged and forested with oak and pines in the highlands and shrubs in the lowlands. Fauna include deer, wild boar, fox, grasshoppers, rabbits, coyotes, reptiles and armadillos.

== Demography ==
As of 2005, the municipality had 2,448 households with a total population of 11,884, of whom 199 spoke an indigenous language. Lachixío Zapotec is spoken in the municipality. Elotepec Zapotec is spoken in the village of San Juan Elotepec.

== Economy ==
Most of the population is engaged in agriculture, growing corn and beans, while a minority is dedicated to logging. Sola de Vega is connected by a paved road to Puerto Escondido, Oaxaca, but other roads are unpaved.
