= San Bartolo Yautepec Zapotec =

Oto-Manguean language of Oaxaca, Mexico

- Yautepec Zapotec
- Native to: Mexico
- Region: Oaxaca
- Native speakers: (250 cited 2000)
- Language family: Oto-Manguean: Zapotecan; Zapotec; (?); San Bartolo Yautepec Zapotec

Language codes
- ISO 639-3: zpb
- Glottolog: yaut1235
- ELP: Yautepec Zapotec

San Bartolo Yautepec Zapotec is an Oto-Manguean language of western Oaxaca, Mexico. It is a divergent Zapotec language, 10% intelligible with Tlacolulita Zapotec and not at all intelligible with other varieties. It is moribund, with all speakers born before 1955.

The ISO name is simply "Yautepec", but several other Zapotec languages go by that name.
