= ZCA =

ZCA or zca may refer to:

- Zero-phase component analysis - a variant of principal component analysis with rotation neutralized.
- Zee Cine Awards, an awards ceremony for the Indian film industry
- zca, the ISO 639-3 code for the Coatecas Altas Zapotec in Oaxaca, Mexico
