= ZPR =

ZPR May refer to:

- Xánica Zapotec, ISO 639-3 language code zpr
- Preston Road tube station, London, England, National Rail station code ZPR
- The LITTLE ZIPPER (ZPR) protein, the first microprotein discovered in plants
- ZPR Media Group, a media company in Poland
- Zero power reactors, identifier of several research nuclear reactors at Argonne National Laboratory; see List of nuclear research reactors#United States
