= Xadani Zapotec =

Zapotec language of Oaxaca, Mexico

- (Santa María Xadani)
- Native to: Mexico
- Region: Oaxaca
- Native speakers: (340 cited 1990 census)
- Language family: Oto-Manguean: Zapotecan; Zapotec; Sierra Sur; Miahuatlan; Xadani Zapotec

Language codes
- ISO 639-3: zax
- Glottolog: xada1235

Xadani Zapotec (Eastern Pochutla Zapotec) is a Zapotec language spoken in southern Oaxaca, Mexico.
