= Quiavicuzas Zapotec =

Language

- (Santiago Quiavicuzas)
- Native to: Mexico
- Region: Oaxaca
- Native speakers: (4,000 cited 1990 census)
- Language family: Oto-Manguean: Zapotecan; Zapotec; Central; Trans-Yautepec; Quiavicuzas Zapotec

Language codes
- ISO 639-3: zpj
- Glottolog: quia1235

Quiavicuzas Zapotec (Northeastern Yautepec Zapotec, Zapoteco de San Juan Lachixila) is a Zapotecan language of the isthmus of Mexico.
