= ZPD =

ZPD may refer to:

- Yavesía Zapotec, ISO 639-3 language code zpd
- Zone of proximal development, a concept in educational psychology
- Zootopia Police Department, the police department in the movie Zootopia
