= Aloápam Zapotec =

Zapotec language of Oaxaca, Mexico

- tizha'
- Native to: Mexico
- Region: Northern Oaxaca
- Native speakers: (3,400 cited 2000 census)
- Language family: Oto-Manguean: Zapotecan; Zapotec; Sierra Norte; Sierra Juárez; Western Ixtlán; Aloápam Zapotec

Language codes
- ISO 639-3: zaq
- Glottolog: aloa1235

Aloápam Zapotec is a Zapotec language of Oaxaca, Mexico.
