= Tejalapan Zapotec =

Zapotecan language

- (San Felipe Tejalápam)
- Native to: Mexico
- Region: Oaxaca
- Ethnicity: 4,700 people in the town (no date, but probably 1990 census)
- Native speakers: (50 cited 2000)
- Language family: Oto-Manguean: Zapotecan; Zapotec; Mazaltepecan?; Tejalapan Zapotec

Language codes
- ISO 639-3: ztt
- Glottolog: teja1235
- ELP: Tejalapan Zapotec

Tejalapan Zapotec (Zapoteco de Tejalápam) is a nearly extinct Zapotecan language of the Mexican state of Oaxaca (San Felipe Tejalapam). It may be closest to the otherwise divergent Mazaltepec Zapotec.
