= San Bernardino, Oaxaca =

Coordinates: 18°07′N 97°00′W

San Bernardino
- Village
- Location in Mexico
- Country: Mexico
- State: Oaxaca
- Municipality: Santa María Tonameca

San Bernardino is a village in Oaxaca, Mexico, in the municipality of Santa María Tonameca.

Coatecas Altas Zapotec is spoken as a result of families coming to the village from Coatecas Altas, Oaxaca.
