= Tlacolulita Zapotec =

Zapotec language of Oaxaca, Mexico

- (Asunción Tlacolulita)
- Native to: Mexico
- Region: Oaxaca
- Native speakers: (53 cited 2000)
- Language family: Oto-Manguean: Zapotecan; Zapotec; Sierra Sur; Cis-Yautepec; Tlacolulita Zapotec

Language codes
- ISO 639-3: zpk
- Glottolog: tlac1240
- ELP: Tlacolulita Zapotec

Tlacolulita Zapotec (Southeastern Yautepec Zapotec) is a Zapotec language of Oaxaca, Mexico. It is not closely related to other languages.
