= Zaniza Zapotec =

Oto-Manguean language

- (Santa María Zaniza); Western Sola de Vega Zapotec; Papabuco
- Native to: Mexico
- Region: Oaxaca
- Native speakers: (770 cited 1990 census)
- Language family: Oto-Manguean: Zapotecan; Zapotec; Papabuco; Zaniza Zapotec

Language codes
- ISO 639-3: zpw
- Glottolog: zani1235
- ELP: Zaniza Zapotec

Zaniza Zapotec (Zapoteco de Santa María Zaniza) is an Oto-Manguean language of western Oaxaca, Mexico. It is one of several Zapotec languages called Papabuco. It has only 10% intelligibility with Texmelucan Zapotec, its closest important relative. (Speakers of the nearly extinct Elotepec Zapotec have 70% understanding of Zaniza, but it is not known if the reverse is true, so this may be a question of familiarity.)

The language is spoken in Santa María Zaniza, Oaxaca. As of 2003, the language had about 400 fluent speakers. It is also spoken in Santiago Textitlán.

== Phonology ==
Zaniza Zapotec Consonants
		Labial	Alveolar	Retroflex	Palatal	Velar		Glottal	
		Labial	Alveolar	Retroflex	Palatal	plain	lab.	plain	lab.
Nasal		m	n		ɲ				
Plosive/ Affricate	fortis	p	t		ʧ	k	kʷ		
Plosive/ Affricate	lenis	b	d		ʤ	g	gʷ		
Fricative	fortis	f	s	ʂ	ʃ			h	hʷ
Fricative	lenis		z	ʐ	ʒ				
Rhotic			ɾ						
Lateral			l		ʎ				
Glide		w			j				

Zaniza Zapotec has five vowels /i, e, a, o, u/, phonemic vowel nasalization, and a distinction between modal and laryngealized vowels.

=== Tone ===
Zaniza Zapotec words contrast low, mid, and high tones on stressed syllables. Unstressed syllables, apart from a few pronominal enclitics, do not bear contrastive tone.
