= Lapaguía Zapotec =

Zapotec language of Oaxaca, Mexico

- (Santiago Lapaguia); Lapaguía-Guivini Zapotec
- Native to: Mexico
- Region: Oaxaca
- Native speakers: (4,200 cited 1983)
- Language family: Oto-Manguean: Zapotecan; Zapotec; Sierra Sur; Cis-Yautepec; Lapaguía Zapotec
- Dialects: Lapaguía; Guivini

Language codes
- ISO 639-3: ztl
- Glottolog: lapa1249

Lapaguía Zapotec, or Lapaguía-Guivini Zapotec, is a Zapotec language spoken in southern Oaxaca, Mexico.
