= Loxicha Zapotec =

Zapotec language of Oaxaca, Mexico

- Diste
- Native to: Mexico
- Region: south Oaxaca
- Native speakers: (75,000 cited 2000 census)
- Language family: Oto-Manguean: Zapotecan; Zapotec; Sierra Sur; Miahuatlan; Loxicha Zapotec
- Dialects: San Agustín Loxicha; San Bartolomé Loxicha; San Andrés Paxtlán; San Miguel Suchixtepec

Language codes
- ISO 639-3: ztp
- Glottolog: loxi1235
- ELP: Coatec Zapotec (shared)

Loxicha Zapotec (Western Pochutla Zapotec) is a Zapotec language of Oaxaca, Mexico. It is one of the most populous varieties of Zapotec, and the majority of speakers are monolingual.

Not all varieties of Zapotec from towns named "Loxicha" are part of Loxicha Zapotec. San Baltázar Loxicha Zapotec, which includes Santa Catarina Loxicha, is a distinct language.

== Phonology ==
=== Vowels ===
	Front	Back
Close	i	u
Mid	e	o
Open	a	

=== Consonants ===
		Bilabial	Dental	Alveolar	Palatal	Velar	Labio- velar	Uvular
Plosive	voiceless	p	t			k	kʷ	
Plosive	voiced	b	d			ɡ		
Affricate	voiceless			ts	tʃ			
Affricate	prenasal				ⁿdʒ			
Fricative	voiceless	(ɸʷ)	θ	(s)	ʃ			χ
Fricative	voiced			z				
Nasal		m		n		(ŋ)		
Rhotic				r				
Lateral				l				
Approximant		w			j			

/b, d/ can be realized as [β ð] when occurring intervocalically. /ɡ/ is realized as [ɣ] when occurring at the first syllable. /ɸʷ, s/ only occur in Spanish loanwords. /ŋ/ only marginally occurs and at the end of a syllable.
