= Xanaguía Zapotec =

Zapotec language of Oaxaca, Mexico

- (Santa Catarina Xanaguía)
- Diidz Zë
- Native to: Mexico
- Region: Oaxaca
- Native speakers: (2,500 cited 1990 census)
- Language family: Oto-Manguean: Zapotecan; Zapotec; Sierra Sur; Cis-Yautepec; Xanaguía Zapotec

Language codes
- ISO 639-3: ztg
- Glottolog: xana1235

Xanaguía Zapotec (Diidz Zë) is a Zapotec language of Oaxaca, Mexico.
