= El Alto Zapotec =

Zapotec language of Oaxaca, Mexico

- (San Pedro el Alto)
- Native to: Mexico
- Region: Oaxaca
- Native speakers: (900 cited 1990 census)
- Language family: Oto-Manguean (MP): Zapotecan; Zapotec; Western; El Alto Zapotec

Language codes
- ISO 639-3: zpp
- Glottolog: elal1235
- ELP: Coyachilla (shared)

El Alto Zapotec (Zapoteco de San Pedro el Alto), also known as South Central Zimatlan Zapotec, is a Zapotec language of Oaxaca, Mexico, spoken in the towns of San Pedro el Alto, San Antonino el Alto, and San Andrés el Alto.

It has 20% intelligibility with the most similar variety of Zapotec, Totomachapan Zapotec.
