= San Baltázar Loxicha Zapotec =

Zapotec language of Oaxaca, Mexico

San Baltazar Loxicha Zapotec
- Native to: Mexico
- Region: Oaxaca
- Native speakers: (1,500 cited 1990 census)
- Language family: Oto-Manguean: Zapotecan; Zapotec; Sierra Sur; Miahuatlan; San Baltazar Loxicha Zapotec

Language codes
- ISO 639-3: zpx
- Glottolog: sanb1241

San Baltazar Loxicha Zapotec (Northwestern Pochutla Zapotec) is a Zapotec language spoken in southern Oaxaca, Mexico. It is spoken in the towns of San Baltazar Loxicha and Santa Catarina Loxicha. It is not the same language as the other dialects spoken in towns named Loxicha, but it is in the same branch of Zapotec.
