= Choápam Zapotec =

Zapotec language of Oaxaca, Mexico

- Diꞌidzaꞌ xidzaꞌ
- Native to: Mexico
- Region: northern Oaxaca, Veracruz
- Native speakers: 12,000 (2007)
- Language family: Oto-Manguean: Zapotecan; Zapotec; Sierra Norte; Choápam Zapotec

Language codes
- ISO 639-3: zpc
- Glottolog: choa1237
- ELP: Choapan

Choápam Zapotec (Zapoteco de Choápam; in Veracruz Zapoteco de San Juan Comaltepec) is a Zapotec language of Oaxaca, Mexico. Historical accounts suggest that Zapotec people arrived in the area of Choapam only a generation or two before the Spanish conquest, conquering what was previously Mixe territory.

== Phonology ==
=== Consonants ===
	Bilabial	Alveolar	Postalveolar	Palatal	Velar	Glottal
Nasal	m	n			ŋ	
Plosive	p b	t d			k g	ʔ
Fricative		s z	ʃ ʒ		(x)	
Affricate		t͡s d͡z	t͡ʃ d͡ʒ			
Liquid		l r				
Glide	w			j		

- [x] occurs as an allophone of [k]
- [r] has the voiceless allophone [ṛ] when in a nasal segment (e.g. rná^{1}baˀ^{2} [ṛnábaˀ] (I ask))
- The pronunciation of [r] is variable, sometimes pronounced as apico-alveolar and with one to several flaps, with one being the most common.

=== Vowels ===
[i], [e], [ɛ], [o], [u], [a]

The vowels [i], [u], [a], [e] and [ɛ] are nasalised when followed by 'n' at the end of a word.

=== Tones ===
Choapam Zapotec has three pitches, or tones, which are high, mid, and low, indicated respectively by [^{3}] (superscript 3), [^{2}] (superscript 2), and [^{1}] (superscript 1), written after each syllable.
