= Lachiguiri Zapotec =

Zapotecan language of the isthmus of Mexico

- (Santiago Lachiguiri)
- Diitza
- Region: Oaxaca, Mexico
- Native speakers: (5,000 cited 1977)
- Language family: Oto-Manguean: Zapotecan; Zapotec; Central; Trans-Yautepec; Lachiguiri Zapotec

Language codes
- ISO 639-3: zpa
- Glottolog: lach1250

Lachiguiri Zapotec (Northwestern Tehuantepec Zapotec, Zapoteco de Santiago Lachiguiri) is a Zapotecan language of the isthmus of Mexico.
