= Ayoquezco Zapotec =

Language

Ayoquesco Zapotec
- (Santa María Ayoquezco)
- Native to: Mexico
- Region: south Oaxaca
- Native speakers: (880 cited 1990 census)
- Language family: Oto-Manguean: Zapotecan; Zapotec; Central; Ayoquesco Zapotec

Language codes
- ISO 639-3: zaf
- Glottolog: ayoq1235
- ELP: Ayoquesco

Ayoquesco Zapotec (Western Ejutla Zapotec, Zapoteco de Santa María Ayoquezco) is a small Zapotec language of Oaxaca, Mexico. Ayoquesco Zapotec (Dísè) is spoken in Santa María Ayoquezco and Santa Cruz Nexila, around 50% intelligible to San Andres Zabache speakers.
