= Guevea Zapotec =

Zapotecan language of the isthmus of Mexico

- Guevea de Humboldt Zapotec
- Native to: Mexico
- Region: Oaxaca
- Native speakers: (4,700 cited 2000 census)
- Language family: Oto-Manguean: Zapotecan; Zapotec; Central; Trans-Yautepec; Guevea Zapotec

Language codes
- ISO 639-3: zpg
- Glottolog: guev1238

Guevea Zapotec, or Guevea de Humboldt Zapotec (Northern Isthmus Zapotec), is a Zapotecan language of the isthmus of Mexico.
