= Yavesía Zapotec =

Zapotec language of Oaxaca, Mexico

- (Santa María Yavesía); Southeastern Ixtlán Zapotec
- Native to: Mexico
- Region: Oaxaca
- Native speakers: (6,000 cited 1992)
- Language family: Oto-Manguean: Zapotecan; Zapotec; Sierra Norte; Sierra Juárez; Yavesía Zapotec

Language codes
- ISO 639-3: zpd
- Glottolog: sout3005
- ELP: Ixtlán (shared)

Yavesía Zapotec, also known as Southeastern Ixtlán Zapotec (Zapoteco del Sureste de Ixtlán) and Latuvi Zapotec, is a Zapotec language of Oaxaca, Mexico.
