= San Pedro el Alto =

San Pedro El Alto
- Municipality and town
- Location in Mexico
- Coordinates: 16°02′N 96°28′W
- Country: Mexico
- State: Oaxaca

Population (2010)
  - Total: 3,903
- Time zone: UTC-6 (Central Standard Time)

San Pedro el Alto is a town and municipality in Oaxaca in south-western Mexico. The municipality covers an area of km^{2}. It is part of the Pochutla District in the east of the Costa Region.

As of 2005, the municipality had a total population of .

El Alto Zapotec is spoken in the town.
