= Santa María Zaniza =

- Municipality and town
- Location in Mexico
- Coordinates: 16°39′N 97°21′W
- Country: Mexico
- State: Oaxaca

Population (2020)
  - Total: 2,469
- Time zone: UTC-6 (Central Standard Time)

Santa María Zaniza is a town and municipality in Oaxaca in southwestern Mexico. It is part of the Sola de Vega District in the Sierra Sur Region.

The Zaniza Zapotec language is spoken in the town.
