= San Agustín Mixtepec Zapotec =

Zapotec language of Oaxaca, Mexico

- Native to: Mexico
- Region: Oaxaca
- Native speakers: (59 cited 1994)
- Language family: Oto-Manguean: Zapotecan; Zapotec; Sierra Sur; Yautepec; San Agustín Mixtepec Zapotec

Language codes
- ISO 639-3: ztm
- Glottolog: sana1286
- ELP: San Agustín Mixtepec Zapotec

San Agustín Mixtepec Zapotec is a nearly extinct Zapotec language of Oaxaca, Mexico.
