= Quiatoni Zapotec =

Zapotec language of Oaxaca, Mexico

- (San Pedro Quiatoni)
- Native to: Mexico
- Region: Oaxaca
- Native speakers: (15,000 cited 2000)
- Language family: Oto-Manguean: Zapotecan; Zapotec; Central; Quiatoni Zapotec

Language codes
- ISO 639-3: zpf
- Glottolog: sanp1261
- ELP: Tlacolula (shared)

Quiatoni Zapotec (San Pedro Quiatoni Zapotec, Eastern Tlacolula Zapotec) is a Zapotec language of Oaxaca, Mexico.
