= Juchitán de Zaragoza =

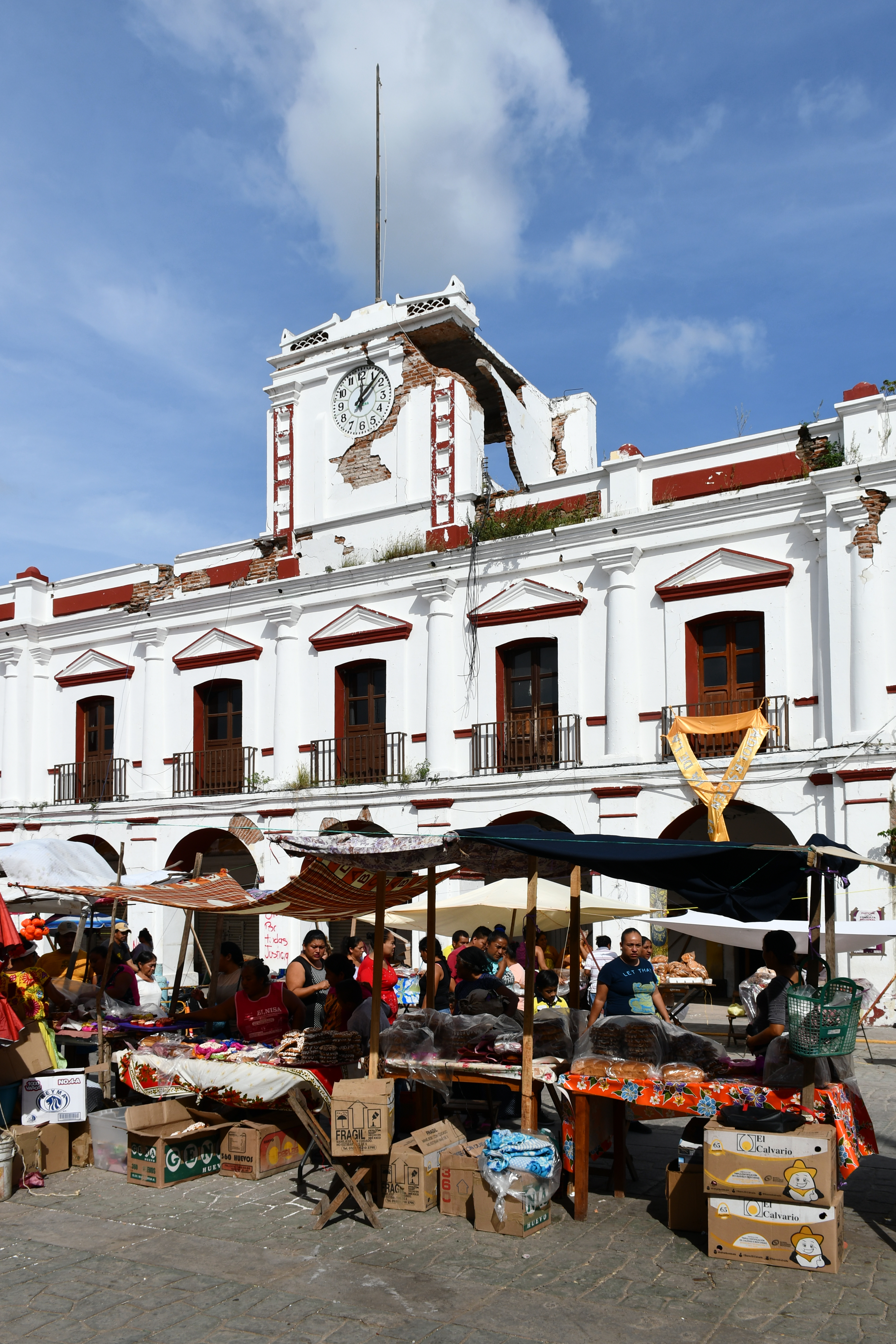
- The Town Hall. Damage from the 2017 earthquake is visible

- Location within Oaxaca Location within Mexico
- Coordinates: 16°26′N 95°01′W
- Country: Mexico
- State: Oaxaca
- Municipality: Juchitán de Zaragoza
- Founded: 1486 Cosijopí (Zapotec king)

Government
  - Municipal president: none
  - Federal electoral district: Oaxaca's 7th

Area
  - Town: 16.4 km^{2} (6.3 sq mi)
  - Municipality: 415 km^{2} (160.1 sq mi)
- Elevation: 30 m (98 ft)

Population (2020 census)
  - Town: 88,280
  - Town density: 5,380/km^{2} (13,900/sq mi)
  - Municipality: 113,570
  - Municipality density: 273.9/km^{2} (709.4/sq mi)
- Demonym: Juchiteco(a)
- Time zone: UTC-6 (Zona Centro)
- Postal code: 70000
- Area code: 971

Juchitán de Zaragoza (Spanish pronunciation: [xutʃiˈtan de saɾaˈɣosa]; Spanish name; Isthmus Zapotec: Xabizende [ʒàbìˈzěndè]) is an indigenous town in the southeast of the Mexican state of Oaxaca. It is part of the Juchitán District in the west of the Istmo de Tehuantepec region. With a 2020 census population of 88,280, it is the third-largest city in the state. The majority of the indigenous inhabitants are Zapotecs and Huaves. The town also serves as the municipal seat for the surrounding municipality, with which it shares a name. The municipality has an area of 414.64 km^{2} (160.1 sq mi) and a population of 113,570, the state's third-largest in population.

Juchitán is located 26 km northeast of the city of Tehuantepec. Its Palacio Municipal dates back to the middle of the 19th century and perhaps is the widest "palace" in Mexico with 31 arches in its front portal. Its main church is the Parroquia de San Vicente Ferrer (Parish of San Vicente Ferrer) which dates from the 17th century. To the west of the Palacio is a large market where local products can be seen and a local variant of the Zapotec language can be heard.

== History ==
The people of Juchitán have led several local revolts. In 1834, "Che Gorio Melendre", a native of Juchitán, directed a revolt against the government of Oaxaca, demanding control of salt mines on the coast southwest of Juchitán and local autonomy of the county. The revolt was interrupted by the Mexican–American War in 1847. Irregular troops commanded by Melendre joined the resistance against the invasion. After the invasion by the United States, the governor of Oaxaca, Benito Juárez, responded to the local demands of Che Gorio Melendre on May 19, 1850, by sending troops to burn the city of Juchitán and to assassinate their leader Melendre.

On September 5, 1866, during the French intervention in Mexico, the indigenous people of Juchitán, Unión Hidalgo, San Blas Atempa, and Ixtaltepec defeated the Royal French Army stationed in Tehuantepec. Most of the army of Porfirio Díaz, later President of Mexico, were natives of Juchitán. José Fructuoso Gómez, nicknamed Che Gómez, directed a 1910 revolt in support of the Mexican Revolution, allied with Zapata and Villa. In the 1970s, a group of left wing students, workers and farmers organized with the intent of taking control of the local county through elections, instead of by force. In February 2001, Juchitán municipality received the caravan of Zapatista Army of National Liberation (EZLN).

The violent history of Juchitán involves the strategic geopolitical location of the area, which is located on the Isthmus of Tehuantepec, the thin part of Mexico between the Pacific Ocean and the Gulf of Mexico. The zone has been coveted by many countries since the McLane–Ocampo Treaty, which was signed in December 1859. Under the treaty, President Benito Juárez received a loan in exchange for the use of the isthmus of Tehuantepec by the United States. In the 1970s an attempt to resurrect the treaty, called the Alfa–Omega project, was aborted. In 2000, the project was finally approved as the Plan Puebla Panama.

Gamesa and Iberdrola are currently making important investments in Juchitán, to create a big wind power eolic park -called Proyecto La Venta II- able to produce at least 88 megawatts of power. The project will make Juchitán the center of renewable energy in Mexico, as well as an example to the rest of Latin America as the eolic park would be the largest in all the region. This project has been criticized because of the lack of information given by Gamesa, Iberdrola and the Mexican Government about its possible ecological, political and cultural consequences on a region whose culture is based on the property of the land used by the Proyecto La Venta II.

In 2006, it was renamed as "Heroica Ciudad de Juchitán de Zaragoza" (Heroic City of Juchitán de Zaragoza) by the State Congress for its inhabitants' defense against the French invasion.

Between June and October 2020, Juchitán reported 241 COVID-19 pandemic-related deaths; space in local cemeteries was at a premium.

In February 2021 the National Institute of Indigenous Peoples (INPI) and the Comisión Federal de Electricidad (CFE) reached an agreement with Santa María del Mar agency to allow the operation of 540 kV solar power plant, providing electricity for the first time in ten years.

In October 2024 President Russell M. Nelson of The Church of Jesus Christ of Latter-day Saints announced that a temple would be constructed in Juchitán de Zaragoza.

=== 2017 Chiapas earthquake ===
Shortly before midnight on 7 September 2017, an earthquake struck off the coast of Chiapas, registered at either 8.1 or 8.2. The historic earthquake was said to have been the strongest in Mexico in a century.

Juchitán de Zaragoza, on the Oaxacan coast, was one of the cities most damaged by the earthquake. Entire streets were destroyed, its 1860 municipal palace suffered notable destruction, with a large part of the building completely collapsed. In the aftermath of the quake, a resident retrieved the national flag of Mexico and placed it on top of the rubble - the image quickly went viral and became a symbol of patriotism and national unity in the disaster-stricken nation.

== Culture ==
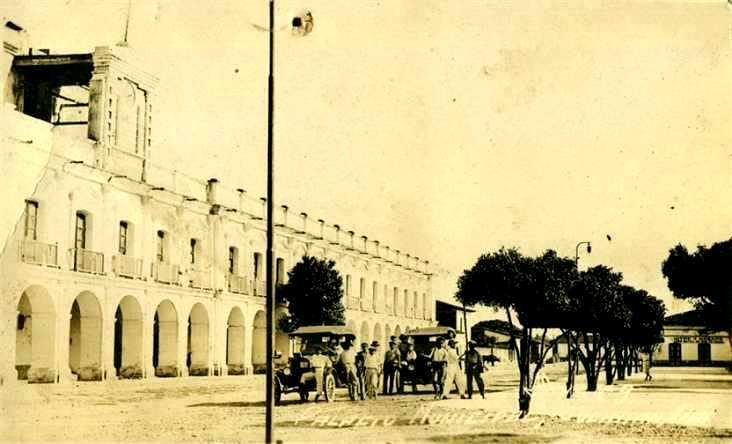
Juchitán Municipal Palace

Citizens of Juchitán have also made contributions in the arts, such as painting, poetry, music, folk dance, and sculpture.

In May, residents celebrate the Fiesta de las Velas (Festival of the Candles) in honor of its patron saint San Vicente Ferrer, with a large procession.

The Isthmus Zapotec, an indigenous people who comprise about 70 percent of the population of Juchitán, practice a melding of Catholic and indigenous spiritual traditions. In a slide-illustrated lecture and book, anthropologist Anya Peterson Royce shows how the Zapotec use flowers, processions and prayer in rituals that protect and guide spirits on their journey of dying. She also describes the Day of the Dead and Holy Week rituals and the role of the community healer.

The municipality also has a reputation as a significant oasis of tolerance and respect for LGBTQ people in Mexico, due to the traditional Zapotec culture of muxes.

== Geography ==
=== Climate ===
Climate data for Juchitán de Zaragoza (1951-2010)
Month	Jan	Feb	Mar	Apr	May	Jun	Jul	Aug	Sep	Oct	Nov	Dec	Year
Record high °C (°F)	40.5 (104.9)	41.5 (106.7)	40.0 (104.0)	46.0 (114.8)	45.0 (113.0)	41.0 (105.8)	42.0 (107.6)	42.0 (107.6)	42.0 (107.6)	42.0 (107.6)	43.0 (109.4)	40.5 (104.9)	46.0 (114.8)
Mean daily maximum °C (°F)	29.8 (85.6)	31.0 (87.8)	32.4 (90.3)	34.0 (93.2)	34.7 (94.5)	32.9 (91.2)	32.6 (90.7)	33.0 (91.4)	32.2 (90.0)	31.4 (88.5)	30.9 (87.6)	30.0 (86.0)	32.1 (89.8)
Daily mean °C (°F)	24.9 (76.8)	25.5 (77.9)	26.9 (80.4)	28.6 (83.5)	29.4 (84.9)	28.2 (82.8)	27.9 (82.2)	28.1 (82.6)	27.5 (81.5)	26.9 (80.4)	26.4 (79.5)	25.4 (77.7)	27.1 (80.8)
Mean daily minimum °C (°F)	19.9 (67.8)	20.0 (68.0)	21.4 (70.5)	23.1 (73.6)	24.0 (75.2)	23.4 (74.1)	23.2 (73.8)	23.3 (73.9)	22.9 (73.2)	22.5 (72.5)	21.8 (71.2)	20.7 (69.3)	22.2 (72.0)
Record low °C (°F)	12.0 (53.6)	10.0 (50.0)	11.5 (52.7)	11.0 (51.8)	15.0 (59.0)	15.0 (59.0)	11.5 (52.7)	14.5 (58.1)	12.0 (53.6)	16.0 (60.8)	13.0 (55.4)	10.6 (51.1)	10.0 (50.0)
Average precipitation mm (inches)	7.2 (0.28)	3.6 (0.14)	5.8 (0.23)	5.8 (0.23)	58.9 (2.32)	228.1 (8.98)	159.7 (6.29)	169.6 (6.68)	239.0 (9.41)	75.0 (2.95)	20.1 (0.79)	5.6 (0.22)	978.4 (38.52)
Average precipitation days (≥ 0.1 mm)	1.0	0.5	0.6	0.6	4.1	11.8	8.5	8.8	11.2	4.7	1.2	0.5	53.5
Source: Servicio Meteorológico National

== The municipality ==
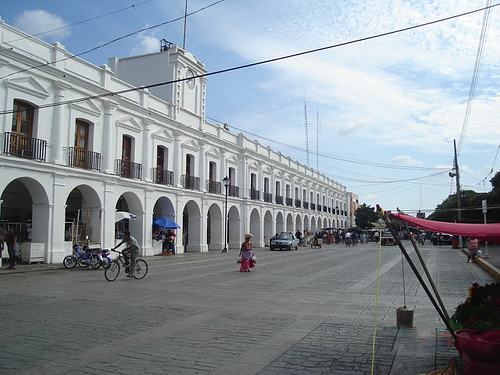
City Hall of Juchitan city

As municipal seat, Juchitán has governing jurisdiction over the following communities:

15 de Agosto, 5 de Septiembre, Álvaro Obregón, Cerro Cristo, Charis, Chicapa de Castro, Colonia 19 de Marzo (Colonia San José), Colonia de la Amistad, Colonia Jesús González Cortaza, Colonia José Yola, Colonia Mariano Montero, Colonia San Vicente, Colonia Santa Rosita, Dos Arbolitos, Dos Hermanos, El Caballero Burro, El Chamizal (Toledo Cueto), El Chaparral, El Porvenir, El Tamarindo, Emiliano Zapata, Esquipulas 1, Esquipulas 2, Estero Guiee, Gaspar Torres Urbieta, Huanacastal, La Esperanza, La Estancia (Santa Cecilia), La Guadalupana, La Liebre (Paraje la Liebre), La Negrita, La Providencia, La Venta, La Ventosa 1, La Ventosa 2, Los Aguacates, Los Cocos Los Ordaz II, Los Vicentes Minerva, Onésimas (Argelino Solórzano), Parada San Vicente, Pepe y Lolita, Piedra Larga, Playa San Vicente, Primera Curva, Rancho Adelma, Rancho Babel López Sánchez, Rancho Chuvalessa, Rancho de los Vásquez (Colonia Palomar), Rancho Domitilo Marquez, Rancho Don Cutberto, Rancho el Ángel, Rancho Esquipulas, Rancho Francisco Rancho Guadalupe, Rancho Juanita, Rancho Lucita, Rancho Martín Vicente, Rancho Nemesio Valdivieso López, Rancho San Antonio, Rancho San Luis, Rancho Torres, Río Viejo (Mojonera), Salinas Santa Cruz, San Antonio, San Isidro, San José, Santa Clara, Santa Fe 1, Santa Fe 2, Santa Lucía, Santa María del Mar, and Santa Rita.
