= Santo Domingo Coatlán Zapotec =

Zapotec language of Oaxaca, Mexico

Coatlán Zapotec
- (Santo Domingo Coatlán)
- Region: Oaxaca in Mexico
- Native speakers: (500 cited 1992)
- Language family: Oto-Manguean: Zapotecan; Zapotec; Sierra Sur; Miahuatlan; Coatlán Zapotec

Language codes
- ISO 639-3: zps
- Glottolog: coat1243
- ELP: Coatec Zapotec (shared)

Coatlán Zapotec (Western Miahuatlán Zapotec) is a Zapotec language spoken in southern Oaxaca, Mexico. It uses linguolabial sounds as onomatopoeia.

It is also known as San Miguel Zapotec and Zapoteco de Santa María Coatlán, to distinguish it from Zapoteco de San Vicente Coatlán. It is the only language that uses the linguolabial click. However, it is only used for onomatopoeias.

== Sources ==
- Beam de Azcona, Rosemary G. 2004. A Coatlán-Loxicha Zapotec Grammar. Ph.D. dissertation. University of California, Berkeley.
