= Xánica Zapotec =

Zapotec language of Oaxaca, Mexico

- (zapoteco de Santiago Xánica)
- Native to: Mexico
- Region: Oaxaca
- Native speakers: (2,500 cited 1990 census)
- Language family: Oto-Manguean: Zapotecan; Zapotec; Sierra Sur; Cis-Yautepec; Xánica Zapotec

Language codes
- ISO 639-3: zpr
- Glottolog: sant1452

Santiago Xanica Zapotec is a Zapotec language of Oaxaca, Mexico.
