= Western Tlacolula Valley Zapotec =

Zapotec language of Oaxaca, Mexico

Tlacolula Valley Zapotec
- Valley Zapotec
- Dizhsa
- Native to: Mexico
- Region: central Oaxaca
- Native speakers: (28,000 cited 1990 census)
- Language family: Oto-Manguean: Zapotecan; Zapotec; Central; Valley; Tlacolula Valley Zapotec
- Dialects: Teotitlán del Valle; San Martín Tilcajete; Jalieza Zapotec; San Juan Teitipac

Language codes
- ISO 639-3: zab
- Glottolog: sanj1284
- ELP: Tlacolula (shared)

A man speaking Tlacolula Valley Zapotec, recorded in San Lucas Quiaviní.

Tlacolula Valley Zapotec or Valley Zapotec, known by its regional name Dizhsa, and formerly known by the varietal name Guelavia Zapotec (Zapoteco de San Juan Guelavía) is a Zapotec language of Oaxaca, Mexico.

Tlacolula Valley Zapotec is a cluster of Zapotec languages spoken in the western Tlacolula Valley, which show varying degrees of mutual intelligibility. All varieties of Valley Zapotec are endangered. The languages in this group include:

- Santa Ana del Valle Zapotec
- Teotitlán del Valle Zapotec
- San Lucas Quiaviní Zapotec
- Tlacolula de Matamoros Zapotec
- San Juan Guelavía Zapotec
- San Jerónimo Tlacochahuaya Zapotec
- San Juan Teitipac Zapotec

Teotitlán del Valle dialect is divergent, 59% intelligible to San Juan Guelavía proper. Valley Zapotec is also spoken in the city of Oaxaca, capital of the state of Oaxaca.

In April 2014, linguist Brook Danielle Lillehaugen, along with students from Haverford and Swarthmore Colleges, visited Tlacolula de Matamoros to present an online Tlacolula Valley Zapotec talking dictionary to local leaders. It was estimated that about 100 elderly speakers of this Zapotecan language remain.

Tlacolula Valley Zapotec is a VSO language.

== Phonology ==
=== Consonants ===
		Labial	Alveolar	Post- alveolar	Retroflex	Velar
Plosive	voiceless	p	t			k
Plosive	voiced	b	d			g
Affricate	voiceless		ts	tʃ	tʂ	
Affricate	voiced		dz	dʒ		
Fricative	voiceless		s	ʃ	ʂ	
Fricative	voiced		z	ʒ	ʐ	
Nasal	voiced	m	n			
Nasal	voiceless	m̥	n̥			
Lateral	voiced		l			
Lateral	voiceless		l̥			
Rhotic			ɾ~r			
Glide		w		j		

Most stops occur to be realized as fricatives and may fluctuate as well; /p b d ɡ/ become [ɸ β ð ɣ~x]. Rhotic consonants are voiceless when preceding a voiceless consonant; /ɾ~r/ ~ [ɾ̥~r̥]. Most consonants may also be geminated (ex. /t/ ~ /tː/). Approximant consonants are phonetically realized as [j̟] and [w̟].

Voiceless stops generally have a slight aspiration. Some sounds are only found in loanwords (/f/ and /j/).

The following is represented in the San Juan Guelavía dialect:

=== Vowels ===
	Front	Central	Back
Close	i	ɨ	u
Mid	e		o
Open		a	

Tlacolula Valley Zapotec vowels are classified as modal, creaky (á), checked (a'), or breathy (ah).

Vowels may also occur as pharyngealized /vˤ/ or glottalized /vˀ/.

Vowels may be differentiated by phonation and tone. Tlacolula Valley Zapotec has four tones: level high, level low, rising, and falling. Vowels differing in phonation often occur together in the same syllable as diphthongs. While a given vowel complex will always have the same tone, there are no tone contrasts for the same vowel complex.

Tones
Tone	Bel	gyia	na	nda
High		gyiia 'will go home'		
high	Be'll 'Abel'			
Low	behll 'fish'		nah 'now' nnah 'says'	
Low		gyihah 'rock'		
Low		gyìa 'agave root'	nàa 'is'	ndàa 'sensitive'
Falling				nda'ah 'had bean poured'
Falling		gyii'ah 'will drink'		
Falling	bèèe'll 'snake	gyììa' 'flower'		
Falling	bèe'l 'naked' bèe'll 'sister		nàa' 'I'	ndàa' 'loose'
Falling			nnàa'ah 'heavy'	ndàa'ah 'had broken'
Falling	beèe'l 'meat'		nnaàa' 'hand	ndaàa' 'hot'

The chart the level high, level low, rising, or falling the tone makes that the syllables make in the vowels of the word. Speakers take notice of the vowel complex, in the chart most words are spelled in the same way.

== Morphology ==
Foreman and Lillehaugen (2017) provide data showing that positional verbs in CVZ have unique morphological properties and participate in a defined set of syntactic constructions, showing that positional verbs formed a formal class of verbs in Valley Zapotec as early as the mid-1500s. This work contributes to the typological literature on positional verbs, demonstrating the type of morphosyntactic work that can be done with a corpus of CVZ texts, and contributes to our understanding of the structure and development of the modern Zapotec positional verb system with implications for the larger Zapotec locative system.

Though the most basic order has the verb at the beginning of the sentence, all Zapotec languages have a number of preverbal positions for topical, focal, negative, and/or interrogative elements. The following example from Quiegolani Zapotec shows a focused element and an adverb before the verb

Laad - foc ʂ-unaa-poss-woman Dolf-Rodolfo d͡ʒe - already z-u - prog-stand nga - there = Roldofo's wife was already standing there.

=== Word order variation ===
Zapotec languages also show the phenomenon known as pied-piping with inversion, which may change the head-initial order of syntactic phrases including noun phrases, adpositional phrases, and quantifier phrases.

=== Verbal morphology ===
==== Passive morphology ====
A few varieties of Zapotec have Passive voice morphology, shown by a prefix on the verb. Compare Texmelucan Zapotec root /o/ 'eat' and its passive stem /dug-o/ 'be eaten', with the prefix /dug-/. In many other cases, the transitive-intransitive verb pairs are appropriately described as causative vs. non-causative verb pairs and not as transitive-passive pairs.

==== Causative morphology ====
Most if not all varieties of Zapotec languages have intransitive-transitive verb pairs which may be analyzed as noncausative vs. causative. The derivation may be obvious or not depending on the kinds of sounds that are involved. In the simplest cases, causative is transparently seen to be a prefix, cognate with /s-/ or with /k-/, but it may also require the use of a thematic vowel /u/, as in the following examples from Mitla Zapotec:

Base verb root	Causative verb stem
/juʔ/ ‘enter’	/u-s-juʔ/ ‘put in' (i.e. 'cause to enter')
/ja/ ‘be clean’	/u-s-ja/ ‘clean' (i.e. 'cause to be clean')

Setting aside possible abstract analyses of these facts (which posit an underlying prefix /k-/ that causes the allomorphemic variations to surface), we can illustrate the kinds of non-causative vs. causative pairs with the following examples. (Basic intransitive verbs are more common than basic transitive verbs, as in many languages.) The presence of the theme vowel /u-/ should be noted in the causative verbs, and in some cases is the only difference between the two verbs. One example of a double causative is also included here; these are not possible in all varieties.

Base verb root	Causative verb stem	
/ʒiˀ/ ‘be squeezed’	/u-ʃiˀ/ ‘squeeze’	
/deʰb/ ‘be wrapped’	/u-teʰb/ ‘wrap’	
/niʰt/ ‘be lost’	/u-nniʰt/ ‘lose’	
/liˀb/ ‘be tied’	/u-lliˀb/ ‘tie’	
/dzukaʰ/ ‘be taken away’	/u-tsukaʰ/ ‘take away’	
/kaˈduˀ/ ‘be tied’	/u-k-waˈduˀ/ ‘tie’	
/uʔtʃ/ ‘be mixed’	/u-g-uʔtʃ/ ‘mix’	/u-s-g-uʔtʃ/ 'stir'

Tlacolula Valley Zapotec differs from other Zapotec language varieties in its use of pronominal clitics in regards to formality and hierarchy.

Zapotec words contain three important syllabic positions: pre-key syllable, key syllable, and clitic. Some key syllables exhibit changes when they are non-phrase final; key syllables containing three vowels may reduce to two-vowel "combination form" sequences, while key syllables containing two vowels may reduce to one vowel syllables.

=== Noun morphology ===
There is virtually no true morphology in the Zapotec noun. There is no case marking. Plurality is indicated (if at all) in the noun phrase, either by a number or a general quantifier that may be simply translated as "plural". Possessors are also indicated in the noun phrase either by a nominal or a pronominal element. (In both of these cases, since the plural morpheme and the pronouns may be enclitics, they are often written as if they were prefixes and suffixes, respectively, although they arguably are not true affixes.)

The only clear morphology in most varieties of Zapotec is the derivational prefix /ʂ-/ (or its cognate) that derives an inherently possessed noun from a noun that does not take a possessor. Compare Mitla Zapotec /koʰb/ 'dough', /ʃ-koʰb/ 'dough of'. The derived noun is used when the possessor is indicated, as in /ʃkoʰb ni/ 'his/her dough'.

Determiners

In Western Tlacolula Valley Zapotec, determiners come in varied forms and have a multitude of uses, with current research suggesting that they may have even more purposes that have yet to be discovered. Most often though, they are used to indicate definiteness, and make both spatial and temporal distinctions in regular discourse, which is similar to several other Zapotec languages. The use of these specific determiners is extremely similar to that of the demonstrative adjective and the definite article in English and Spanish. These four main determiners are: =rè (the proximal), =kang (the medial), =re (the distal), and =ki (the distal/invisible). The three spatial determiners each have their own specific usages: =rè (the proximal) is used to reference something close to the speaker, =re (the distal) has the same purpose for things that are slightly further away, but generally still visible, and =ki (the distal/invisible) is for referents that are not visible at all to the speaker at the time of utterance. It is possible that =kang (the medial) can be used to signify a medium distance between =rè and =re, but it is more likely that its main function is actually indicative. Also, research in the last decade has revealed that the distal =ki is typically the most commonly used determiner, since its function of denoting the past tense is required when telling folktales, local legends, or recounting personal narratives. At this time, there is still no evidence to suggest that the speaker's position relative to that of the referent's carries any significance in any of these scenarios.

== Syntax ==
Here are a few syntax terminology that are relevant to this section:

Relevant syntactic terminology
Part of speech	Abbreviation
Noun	N
Verb	V
Article	Art.
Adjective	Adj.
Conjunction	Conj.
Adverb	Adv.
Preposition	Pre.
Pronouns	Pr.
Noun phrase	NP
Verb phrase	VP
Prepositional phrase	PP

Below is a relevant lexicon for the sentence examples.

Lexicon
English	Zapotec
Christmas	Nabidaa (N)
dinner	xchihih (N)
aunt	biied (N)
Paula	Lia Paww (N)
makes	ruhny (V)
by	caàa'nn (Pre.)
is	càa (V)
prepared	ryehnny (V)
uncle	ti'u (N)
Alfonso	Po'onnzh (N)
up	nehz yaàa' (N)
whisks	rsyaàa'd (V)
whisked	ryaàa'd (V)
drinks	boluntaa (N)

Examples of sentence structure (San Lucas Quiaviní Zapotec)
English	Zapotec	Subject	Verb	Object
Aunt Paula makes Christmas dinner.	Biied Lia Paaw ruhny Nabidaa xchihih.	Aunt Paula	makes	Christmas dinner
Christmas dinner is prepared by Aunt Paula.	Nabidaa xchihih càa ryehnny caàa'nn Biied Lia Paaw.	Aunt Paula	is prepared by	Christmas dinner
Uncle Alfonso whisks up Christmas drinks.	Ti’u Po’onnzh rsyaàa'd nehz yaàa' Nabidaa boluntaa.	Uncle Alfonso	whisks up	Christmas drinks
Christmas drinks whisked up by Uncle Alfonso	Nabidaa boluntaa ryaàa'd nehz yaàa' caàa'nn Ti’u Po’onnzh	Uncle Alfonso	whisked up	Christmas drinks

Syntactic analysis
Subject (NP) English	Subject (NP) Zapotec	Verb (VP) English	Verbal predicate head (V) Zapotec	Preposition Zapotec PP	Preposition English	Object (NP) English	Object (NP) Zapotec (NP → NP N)
Aunt Paula	Biied Lia Paaw	makes	ruhny	-		Christmas dinner	Nabidaa xchihih
Christmas dinner	Nabidaa xchihih	is prepared	càa ryehnny	caàa'nn	by	Aunt Paula	Biied Lia Paaw
Uncle Alfonso	Ti’u Po’onnzh	whisks up	rsyaàa'd nehz yaàa'	-		Christmas drinks	Nabidaa boluntaa
Christmas drinks	Nabidaa boluntaa	whisked up	ryaàa'd nehz yaàa'	caàa'nn	by	Uncle Alfonso	Ti’u Po’onnzh

== Orthography ==
Very few Tlacolula Valley Zapotec speakers are literate in the language. Of the two main orthographies used, twelve consonant sounds are generally agreed upon by both: p, t, c/qu, b, d, f, g/gu, j, ts, z, r, rr, and y. Six vowel sounds are generally agreed upon: a, e, i, o, u, and ë/ɨ.

Vowel orthography
Vowel	Phonetic identification
a	plain (non-creaky, non-checked)
àa	checked
aa	creaky or checked

More complicated systems exist, which include contour tones and broader differentiation of vowel types. However, more recent analysis of the New Testament reveals that vowel types are differentiated orthographically to a greater extent than current vowel orthography systems suggest (for example, using an acute accent on single vowels to differentiate different words spelled the same way).

== Bibliography ==
- Liga Bíblica, La [Jones, Ted, et al.]. 1995. Xtiidx Dios Cun Ditsa (El Nuevo Testamento en el zapoteco de San Juan Guelavía y en español).
- Jones, Ted E., and Lyle M. Knudson. 1977. "Guelavía Zapotec Phonemes". Studies in Otomanguean Phonology, ed., William R. Merrifield, pp. 163–80. [Dallas/Arlington]: SIL / University of Texas, Arlington.
- Jones, Ted E., and Ann D. Church. 1985. "Personal pronouns in Guelavía Zapotec". S.I.L.-Mexico Workpapers 7: 1–15.
- Munro, Pamela (2003). Preserving the Language of the Valley Zapotecs: The Orthography Question (PDF). Language and Immigration in France and the United States: Sociolinguistic Perspectives University of Texas. pp. 1–23.
- Munro, Pamela, Brook Danielle Lillehaugen and Felipe H. Lopez. 2007. Cali Chiu? A Course in Valley Zapotec.
- Munro, Pamela and Felipe H. Lopez, with Olivia V. Méndez, Rodrigo Garcia, and Michael R. Galant. 1999. Di'csyonaary X:tèe'n Dìi'zh Sah Sann Lu'uc (San Lucas Quiaviní Zapotec Dictionary/ Diccionario Zapoteco de San Lucas Quiaviní). Chicano Studies Research Center Publications, UCLA.
- Suarez, Jorge A., 1983. The Mesoamerican Indian Languages. Cambridge University Press, p. 40.
- Fenton, Donna. (2010). Multiple functions, multiple techniques: The role of methodology in a study of Zapotec determiners. In Andrea L. Berez, Jean Mulder, & Daisy Rosenblum (Eds.), Fieldwork and linguistic analysis in indigenous languages of the americas (125–145). Honolulu, HI: University of Hawai’i Press.
