= Miahuatlán Zapotec =

Zapotec language of Oaxaca, Mexico

- Cuixtla Zapotec
- Diiste
- Native to: Mexico
- Region: Oaxaca
- Native speakers: 1,000 (2007)
- Language family: Oto-Manguean: Zapotecan; Zapotec; Sierra Sur; Miahuatlan; Miahuatlán Zapotec

Language codes
- ISO 639-3: zam
- Glottolog: miah1235

Miahuatlán Zapotec, also known as Cuixtla Zapotec, is a Zapotec language spoken in southern Oaxaca, Mexico.

== Sources ==
- Ruegsegger, Manis & Jane Ruegsegger. 1955. Vocabulario zapoteco del dialecto de Miahuatlán del Estado de Oaxaca. Mexico City: Instituto Lingüístico de Verano.
