= Totomachapan Zapotec =

Zapotec language of Oaxaca, Mexico

- (San Pedro Totomachápam)
- Native to: Mexico
- Region: Oaxaca
- Ethnicity: 1,010 (1990 census)
- Native speakers: (260 cited 1990 census)
- Language family: Oto-Manguean (MP): Zapotecan; Zapotec; Western; Soltecoan; Totomachapan Zapotec

Language codes
- ISO 639-3: zph
- Glottolog: toto1308
- ELP: Totomachapam

Totomachapan Zapotec (Western Zimatlán Zapotec) is a Zapotec language of Oaxaca, Mexico. There is no mutual intelligibility with other Zapotec languages.
