= Santa María Lachixío =

Town and municipality in Oaxaca, Mexico

- Municipality and town
- Location in Mexico
- Coordinates: 16°43′N 97°01′W
- Country: Mexico
- State: Oaxaca
- Time zone: UTC-6 (Central Standard Time)

Santa María Lachixío is a town and municipality in Oaxaca in southwestern Mexico. The municipality covers an area of approximately 49 km^{2} (19 sq mi). It is part of the Sola de Vega District in the Sierra Sur Region.

As of 2020, the municipality had a total population of 1,679.

Lachixío Zapotec is spoken in the town.
