= Elotepec Zapotec =

Zapotec language of a village in Oaxaca

- (San Juan Elotepec)
- Papabuco
- Native to: Mexico
- Region: Oaxaca
- Native speakers: (200 cited 1990 census)
- Language family: Oto-Manguean: Zapotecan; Zapotec; Papabuco; Elotepec Zapotec

Language codes
- ISO 639-3: zte
- Glottolog: elot1235
- ELP: Elotepec Zapotec

Elotepec Zapotec (Zapoteco de San Juan Elotepec) is a Zapotec language of a single village in western Oaxaca, Mexico, San Juan Elotepec in the Municipio of Villa Sola de Vega. It is one of several Zapotec languages called Papabuco, and has 68% intelligibility of Zaniza Zapotec.

INALI, the National Institute of Indigenous Languages of Mexico, and the Documenting Endangered Languages Program of the National Science Foundation have funded the creation of an online archive of Elotepec Zapotec.

== Sources ==
- Operstein, Natalie. "San Juan Elotepec Zapotec in written sources" (PDF). Archived from the original (PDF) on 2014-03-10.
- Belmar, Francisco (1901). Breve noticia del idioma papabuco del pueblo de Elotepec. Idiomas indígenas del estado de Oaxaca. Oaxaca: Imprenta del Comercio. OCLC 19643637.
