= Mixtepec Zapotec =

Oto-Manguean language of Oaxaca, Mexico

- (San Juan Mixtepec)
- Native to: Mexico
- Region: Oaxaca
- Native speakers: (7,000 cited 1991)
- Language family: Oto-Manguean: Zapotecan; Zapotec; Sierra Sur; Cis-Yautepec; Mixtepec Zapotec
- Dialects: San Jose Lachiguiri

Language codes
- ISO 639-3: zpm
- Glottolog: mixt1426
- ELP: Mixtepec Zapotec

Mixtepec Zapotec (San Juan Mixtepec Zapotec, Eastern Miahuatlán Zapotec) is an Oto-Manguean language of Oaxaca, Mexico. It is reported to have 80% intelligibility with Lapaguía Zapotec, but with only 45% intelligibility in the other direction.

The variety of San Jose Lachiguiri is perhaps a separate language.
