= San Lucas Quiaviní =

- Municipality and town
- Location in Mexico
- Coordinates: 16°54′N 96°28′W
- Country: Mexico
- State: Oaxaca

Area
  - Total: 58.69 km^{2} (22.66 sq mi)

Population (2005)
  - Total: 1,769
- Time zone: UTC-6 (Central Standard Time)

San Lucas Quiaviní is a town and municipality in Oaxaca in south-western Mexico. The municipality covers an area of 58.69 km^{2}. It is part of the Tlacolula District in the east of the Valles Centrales Region.

As of 2005, the municipality had a total population of 1,769.
