= Lachixío Zapotec =

Zapotec language of Oaxaca, Mexico

- East Sola de Vega Zapotec
- Dialu
- Native to: Mexico
- Region: Oaxaca
- Native speakers: 3000 (2007)
- Language family: Oto-Manguean (MP): Zapotecan; Zapotec; Western; Lachixío Zapotec

Language codes
- ISO 639-3: zpl
- Glottolog: lach1249
- ELP: Coyachilla (shared)

Lachixío Zapotec is a Zapotec language of Oaxaca, Mexico. It is spoken in the Sola de Vega District by around 3000 speakers in Santa María Lachixío and San Vicente Lachixío. While many other Zapotec languages have suffered major language shifts to Spanish, most children in these towns are raised with Zapotec and learn Spanish at an early age (Sicoli 2007: 28).

Lachixío is part of the West Zapotec language branch, which is considered the earliest divergent branch of the Zapotec family and adjacent to the Chatino language family (Sicoli 2015). Many of the Zapotec languages are mutually unintelligible. However, some Zapotec languages share many grammatical features such as word and morpheme order as well as many lexical items.

Like other Zapotec languages, Lachixío Zapotec is a tonal language with VSO word order. The language contains a variety of clitics, including subject and object enclitics pronouns, which are prosodically bound to the following or preceding stressed unit (Sicoli 2007: 70).

== Sources ==
- Sicoli, Mark A. 2000. "Loanwords and contact-induced phonological change in Lachixío Zapotec." Proceedings of the 25th annual meeting of the Berkeley Linguistics Society. Berkeley: Berkeley Linguistic Society.
- Sicoli, Mark A. 2007. Tono: A linguistic ethnography of tone and voice in a Zapotec region. University of Michigan PhD dissertation.
- Sicoli, Mark A. 2010. "Shifting voices with participant roles: Voice qualities and speech registers in Mesoamerica." Language in Society 39(4): 521-553.
- Sicoli, Mark A. 2011. "Agency and ideology in language shift and language maintenance." Ethnographic contributions to the study of endangered languages: A linguistic anthropological perspective, edited by Tania Granadillo and Heidi Orcutt-Gachiri, 161-176. Tucson: University of Arizona Press.
- Sicoli, Mark A. 2015. "Agency and verb valence in Lachixío Zapotec." Valence changes in Zapotec: Synchrony, Diachrony, Typology, edited by Natalie Operstein & Aaron Sonnenschien. Amsterdam: John Benjamins Publishing Company, Typological Studies in Language Series.
