= Zapotecan languages =

Oto-Manguean language branch of Mexico

Zapotecan
- Sapotekan
- Geographic distribution: Oaxaca, Mexico
- Linguistic classification: Oto-Manguean: Eastern Oto-Mangue; Popolocan–Zapotecan; Zapotecan
- Subdivisions: Zapotec; Chatino

Language codes
- Glottolog: zapo1436

The Zapotecan languages are a group of related Oto-Manguean languages which descend from the common Proto-Zapotecan language spoken by the Zapotec people during the era of the dominance of Monte Albán.

== Classification ==
The Zapotecan languages are usually divided into two branches; the Zapotec languages and the Chatino languages. Minor variants, including Solteco Zapotec and Papabuco, are considered by some authors to be divergent Zapotec languages. Based on analysis of the pronominal systems and other innovations, the following relationship has been proposed:

- Zapotecan
  - Chatino
    - Zenzontepec Chatino
    - Coastal
      - Tataltepec Chatino
      - Eastern Chatino
  - Zapotec
    - - Solteco
      - Northern
        - Sierra
        - Cajonos
        - Rincón
      - Central
        - Valley
        - Isthmus
    - Southern
    - Papabuco

Glottochronological estimates place the time of diversification of Proto-Zapotecan to 24 centuries ago; that is to say, about a millennium more than the time of diversification for Zapotec itself.

Since the 19th century, a relationship between the Zapotecan languages and the Mixtecan languages within Oto-Manguean has been recognized; these two sub-families would form an Eastern branch of Oto-Manguean.

== Lexical comparison ==
The following table shows the pronominal subjects en Proto-Zapotec, Chatino, Papabuco, and Proto-Zapotecan:

GLOSS	Proto-Zapotec	Chatino	Papabuco	Proto-Zapotecan
1S	*naʔ	ʔnyãã^{43}	ã	*naʔ
2S	*luʔ(i) *nuʔ	ʔĩĩ^{21}	ru	*luʔ *nuʔ
3S.HUM	*pi			
3S.AN	*ma(ni)			
3S.IN	*ni			
1P.IN	*na	ʔnyãã^{23}	na	*nã
1P.EX	*tyiʔu *ya	ʔwa^{43}		*yã
2P	*wa	ʔwã^{32}		*wã
3P				

The numerals have the following tentative reconstruction:

	one	two	three	four	five	six	seven	eight	nine	ten
Proto-Zapotec	*tobi	*t^{j}op-	*tson-	*tap-	*gayoʔ	*šopa	*ga'tsi	*šonoʔ	*gaʔ	*tsi
Highland Chatino	ska^{23}	tuk^{w}a^{32}	snã^{32}	hak^{w}a^{23}	ki'yu^{32}	sk^{w}a^{32}	kati^{21}	snũ^{23}	kaa^{2}	tii^{2}
Proto-Zapotecan		*tuk^{w}-	*tsna-	*tak^{w}-	*kayu^{ʔ}	*sk^{w}a	*ka'ti	*snu	*ka^{ʔ}	*tii
