= List of Oto-Manguean languages =

The following list of Oto-Manguean languages includes languages by ISO 639-3 code and their respective geographical distributions as given by Ethnologue (22nd edition).

== Languages ==
| Language | ISO 639-3 code | State(s) | Municipalities and towns |
|---|---|---|---|
| Amuzgo, Guerrero | amu | Guerrero | Xochistlahuaca municipality, Cochoapa, Cozoyoapan, Guadalupe Victoria, Huehuetonoc, Huistepec, Rancho del Cura, Tlacoachistlahuaca, and Zacoalpan. The Santa Catarina River separates the Guerrero variety from Oaxaca varieties. |
| Amuzgo, Ipalapa | azm | Oaxaca | Putla District, La Ciénaga, Santa María Ipalapa northeast of San Pedro Amuzgos, Tlaxiaco to coast |
| Amuzgo, San Pedro Amuzgos | azg | Oaxaca | Putla District, San Pedro Amuzgos and outlying settlements |
| Cuicatec, Tepeuxila | cux | Oaxaca | 16 towns in northwest |
| Cuicatec, Teutila | cut | Oaxaca | San Pedro Teutila; 8 towns |
| Mixtec, Juxtlahuaca | vmc | Oaxaca | San Martín Duraznos, San Miguel Tlacotepec, San Sebastián Tecomaxtlahuaca, Santa María Tindú, and Santa María Yucunicoco, central Santiago Juxtlahuaca, Santos Reyes Tepejillo; Baja California state: San Quintín valley |
| Mixtec, Tijaltepec | xtl | Oaxaca | Tlaxiaco District: San Pablo Tijaltepec, and Santa María Yosoyúa towns |
| Mixtec, Yoloxóchitl | xty | Guerrero | San Luis Acatlán municipality, Cuanacastitlán and Yoloxóchitl, south of Tlapa, halfway between the Metlatónoc and Ayutla Mixtec |
| Mixtec, Ayutla | miy | Guerrero | Ayutla and scattered in about 30 mountain towns |
| Mixtec, Cacaloxtepec | miu | Oaxaca | Santiago Cacaloxtepec town |
| Mixtec, Chazumba | xtb | Oaxaca | Santiago Chazumba municipality and town, San Pedro y San Pablo Tequixtepec; Puebla state: Petlalcingo, Santa Gertrudis Cosoltepec, Totoltepec de Guerrero, and Zapotitlán villages |
| Mixtec, Chigmecatitlán | mii | Puebla | Santa Catarina Tlaltempan and Santa María Chigmecatitlán south of Puebla City |
| Mixtec, Coatzospan | miz | Oaxaca | San Juan Coatzóspan |
| Mixtec, Diuxi-Tilantongo | xtd | Oaxaca | Diuxi and Tilantongo areas, 20 towns or villages. Mexico City, Oaxaca City and Puebla City |
| Mixtec, Magdalena Peñasco | xtm | Oaxaca | Tlaxiaco District, San Agustín Tlacotepec, San Cristobal Amoltepec, San Mateo Peñasco, and Santa María Magdalena Peñasco municipalities |
| Mixtec, Metlatónoc | mxv | Guerrero | Cochoapa and Tlacoachistlahuaca municipalities, Metlatónoc, San Rafael, and towns south |
| Mixtec, Ocotepec | mie | Oaxaca | west central |
| Mixtec, San Miguel el Grande | mig | Oaxaca | Chalcatongo |
| Mixtec, Santa María Zacatepec | mza | Oaxaca | Atotonilco, Las Palmas, Nejapa, Rancho de la Virgen, San Juan Viejo, San Miguel, and Tapanco towns |
| Mixtec, Southeastern Nochixtlán | mxy | Oaxaca | Nochixtlán District, El Oro, La Herradura, La Paz, La Unión Zaragoza, Ojo de Agua Nuxaá, Reforma, San Andrés Nuxiño, Santa Inés de Zaragoza, and Santo Domingo Nuxaá |
| Mixtec, Southwestern Tlaxiaco | meh | Oaxaca | |
| Mixtec, Tidaá | mtx | Oaxaca | |
| Mixtec, Tututepec | mtu | Oaxaca | San Pedro Tututepec, Santa Cruz Tututepec, Santa María Acatepec, and other towns |
| Mixtec, Yosondúa | mpm | Oaxaca | |
| Mixtec, Yucuañe | mvg | Oaxaca | northeast Tlaxiaco District, San Bartolomé Yucuañe. Many work in Mexico City and the United States. |
| Mixtec, Yutanduchi | mab | Oaxaca | Nochixtlán District, Yutanduchi de Guerrero |
| Mixtec, Alacatlatzala | mim | Guerrero | Alacatlatzala, Cahuatache, Cuautipa, Cuba Libre, Jilotepec, Ocuapa, and Potoichan, Quiahuitlatlatzala, San Isidro Labrador, Tenaztalcingo, Tepecocatlán, Tototepec, Xonacatlán, and Zacatipa towns; across western border, into Oaxaca state |
| Mixtec, Alcozauca | xta | Guerrero and Oaxaca | near Metlatónoc, Guerrero (14 villages); south of San Mateo Neyapan, Oaxaca |
| Mixtec, Amoltepec | mbz | Oaxaca | Santiago Amoltepec municipality, Sola de Vega District, Barranca Oscura, Colonia de Jesús, El Armadillo, El Cocal, El Laurel, El Mamey, El Zapote, La Mesilla, La Tortuga, Las Cuevas, Llano Conejo and Llano Tigre. 20 villages. |
| Mixtec, Apasco-Apoala | mip | Oaxaca | Jocotipac, Nduayaco, San Miguel Chicahua, San Miguel Huautla, Santa María Apasco, and other towns |
| Mixtec, Atatlahuca | mib | Oaxaca | San Esteban Atatlahuca and Santa Catarina Yosonotú towns |
| Mixtec, Chayuco | mih | Oaxaca | Santa Catarina Mechoacán and San Agustín Chayuco municipalities |
| Mixtec, Cuyamecalco | xtu | Oaxaca | Cuicatlán District: Cuyamecalco, San Miguel Santa Flor, and Santa Ana Cuauhtémoc |
| Mixtec, Huitepec | mxs | Oaxaca | Huitepec municipality, San Antonio Huitepec, San Francisco Yucucundo and Santiago Huajolotipac. Baja California state: near Ensenada |
| Mixtec, Itundujia | mce | Oaxaca | Putla District, Guerrero and Morelos villages southwest of Yosondúa, southeast of Putla |
| Mixtec, Ixtayutla | vmj | Oaxaca | Jamiltepec District, Carasul, El Carasol, El Huamuche, El Mosco, Frutillo, Ixtayutla, La Humedad, Las Limas, Llano Escondido, Llano Verde, Macahuite, Nuyuku, Olintepec, Pueblo Viejo, San Lucas, Santiago Ixtayutla, Xiniyuba, Yomuche, Yucuyá |
| Mixtec, Jamiltepec | mxt | Oaxaca | San Andrés Huaxtaltepec, Santa Elena Comaltepec, Santa María Huazolotitlán, Santiago Jamiltepec, Santiago Tetepec |
| Mixtec, Mitlatongo | vmm | Oaxaca | Nochixtlán, Santa Cruz Mitlatongo, and Santiago Mitlatongo |
| Mixtec, Mixtepec | mix | Oaxaca | San Juan Mixtepec, Tlaxiaco (district head); Baja California state: San Quintín valley |
| Mixtec, Northern Tlaxiaco | xtn | Oaxaca | Teposcolula District, San Antonino Monte Verde and San Sebastián Nicananduta municipalities; Tlaxiaco District, San Juan Ñumí and Santiago Nundichi municipalities |
| Mixtec, Northwest Oaxaca | mxa | Oaxaca | Guadalupe Portezuelo, San Simón Zahuatlán, and Santos Reyes Yucuná |
| Mixtec, Peñoles | mil | Oaxaca | Santa María Peñoles municipality, Cholula, Huazolotipac, and Monteflor agencies |
| Mixtec, Pinotepa Nacional | mio | Oaxaca | Jamiltepec District: Pinotepa de Don Luis, San Antonio Tepetlapa, San Francisco Sayultepec, San Juan Atoyac, San Juan Cacahuatepec, San Juan Jicayán, San Miguel Tlacamama, San Pedro Jicayán, San Pedro Tulixtlahuaca, San Sebastian Ixcapa, Santa Cruz Itacuán, Santa María Jicaltepec, Santiago Pinotepa Nacional, and Tulixtlahuaca |
| Mixtec, San Juan Colorado | mjc | Oaxaca | San Juan Colorado and San Pedro Atoyac in coastal area |
| Mixtec, San Juan Teita | xtj | Oaxaca | Tlaxiaco District, San Juan Teita town |
| Mixtec, San Miguel Piedras | xtp | Oaxaca | Nochixtlán District |
| Mixtec, Santa Lucía Monteverde | mdv | Oaxaca | Putla District, mostly Agua del Toro and Ocotlán |
| Mixtec, Silacayoapan | mks | Oaxaca | San Jorge Nuchita, Santo Domingo Tonala; also in Tijuana |
| Mixtec, Sindihui | xts | Oaxaca | Sindihui municipality |
| Mixtec, Sinicahua | xti | Oaxaca | Tlaxiaco District, Sinicahua municipality, San Antonio Sinicahua and Siniyucu |
| Mixtec, Southern Puebla | mit | Oaxaca | Zapotitlán Palmas municipality; Puebla state: Acatlán, Petlalcingo, San Jerónimo Xayacatlán, and Xayacatlán de Bravo municipalities |
| Mixtec, Soyaltepec | vmq | Oaxaca | Teposcolula District, Guadalupe Gabilera, and San Bartolo Soyaltepec villages |
| Mixtec, Tacahua | xtt | Oaxaca | Tlaxiaco District, southeast of San Miguel el Grande, east of Yosondúa |
| Mixtec, Tamazola | vmx | Oaxaca | Nochixtlán and San Juan Tamazola |
| Mixtec, Tezoatlán | mxb | Oaxaca | Tezoatlán area, San Andrés Yutatío, San Isidro de Zaragoza, San Juan Diquiyú, San Marcos de Garzón, San Martín del Río, San Valentín de Gómez, Santa Catarina Yotandú, Yucuñuti de Benito Juárez, and Yucuquimi de Ocampo |
| Mixtec, Tlazoyaltepec | mqh | Oaxaca | Santiago Tlazoyaltepec municipality; Baja California state: Maneadero area south of Ensenada |
| Mixtec, Western Juxtlahuaca | jmx | Oaxaca and Guerrero | Oaxaca: San Martín Peras and Río Frijol; Guerrero: Santa Cruz Yucucani, and San José Yoxocaño municipalities, Malvabisco, Rancho Limón, Río Aguacate, Boca de Mamey, Oaxaca-Guerrero border due west of Juxtlahuaca; Baja California, and Mexico (San Quintín valley, Maneadero, Tijuana, San Antonio de las Minas) |
| Triqui, Chicahuaxtla | trs | Oaxaca | Tlaxiaco District, San José Xochistlán; Putla District, Santo Domingo del Estado |
| Triqui, Copala | trc | Oaxaca | Juxtlahuaca, Miguel Alemán, San Juan Copala; Sonora (1,000 speakers); Baja California state: San Quintín valley; Mexico City. |
| Triqui, San Martín Itunyoso | trq | Oaxaca | Tlaxiaco |
| Mazatec, Jalapa de Díaz | maj | Oaxaca and Veracruz | 13 towns |
| Mazatec, Chiquihuitlán | maq | Oaxaca | |
| Mazatec, Huautla | mau | Oaxaca | Huautla northeast to Presa Miguel Alemán, and Puebla |
| Mazatec, Ixcatlán | mzi | Oaxaca | Chichicazapa, Nuevo Ixcatlán, and San Pedro Ixcatlán |
| Mazatec, San Jerónimo Tecóatl | maa | Oaxaca | San Antonio Eloxochitlán, San Jerónimo Tecóatl, San Lorenzo, San Lucas Zoquiapan, San Pedro Ocopetatillo, Santa Ana, and Santa Cruz Acatepec municipalities; a few in Puebla and San Sebastian Tlacotepec municipalities. 12 towns. |
| Mazatec, Ayautla | vmy | Oaxaca | Teotitlán District: San Bartolomé Ayautla |
| Mazatec, Mazatlán | vmz | Oaxaca | Teotitlán District: Mazatlán Villa de Flores in 32 towns and villages; Distrito Federal |
| Mazatec, Puebla and Northeastern | pbm | Oaxaca | San Francisco Huehuetlán, San Lorenzo Cuaunecuiltitla, and Santa Ana Ateixtlahuaca, Oaxaca; Puebla state: San Sebastian Tlacotepec, Santa María Coyomeapan, Tezonapa, Veracruz |
| Mazatec, Soyaltepec | vmp | Oaxaca | Tuxtepec District, Soyaltepec municipality, San Miguel Soyaltepec, Santa María Jacatepec and Soyaltepec island |
| Popoloca, San Juan Atzingo | poe | Puebla | San Juan Atzingo |
| Popoloca, San Marcos Tlacoyalco | pls | Puebla | San Francisco Esperilla, San José Buenavista, San Juan Sacavasco, San Marcos Tlacoyalco, and San Martín Esperilla |
| Popoloca, Santa Inés Ahuatempan | pca | Puebla | Santa Inés Ahuatempan and Todos Santos Almolonga west of Coyotepec and Tehuacán |
| Popoloca, Coyotepec | pbf | Puebla | Coyotepec and San Mateo west of Tehuacán, east of Ahuatempan |
| Popoloca, Mezontla | pbe | Puebla | southwest of Tehuacán city, 1 town; Oaxaca state: border area |
| Popoloca, San Felipe Otlaltepec | pow | Puebla | Huejonapan, San Felipe Otlaltepec, Santa María Nativitas |
| Popoloca, San Luis Temalacayuca | pps | Puebla | San Luis Temalacayuca |
| Chocholtec | coz | Oaxaca | Nochixtlán District: San Juan Bautista Coixtlahuaca, San Miguel Tulancingo, and Santa María Nativitas |
| Ixcatec | ixc | Oaxaca | Nochixtlán, Santa María Ixcatlán |
| Chatino, Zacatepec | ctz | Oaxaca | Juquila District, San Marcos Zacatepec and Juquila villages |
| Chatino, Eastern Highland | cly | Oaxaca | Juquila District, Lachao Pueblo Nuevo, and Santa María Yolotepec villages |
| Chatino, Nopala | cya | Oaxaca | Juquila District; Atotonilco, Cerro el Aire, San Gabriel Mixtepec, Santa María Magdalena Tiltepec, Santa María Temaxcaltepec, Santiago Cuixtla, Santos Reyes Nopala, and Teotepec |
| Chatino, Tataltepec | cta | Oaxaca | Juquila District, extreme west lowland Chatino area, San Pedro Tututepec and Tataltepec de Valdés towns; a few in nearby Spanish centers |
| Chatino, Western Highland | ctp | Oaxaca | Juquila District, Panixtlahuaca, San Juan Quiahije, Yaitepec towns; Ixtapan, Tepenixtelahuaca, Ixpantepec, Amialtepec villages; some hamlets |
| Chatino, Zenzontepec | czn | Oaxaca | Juquila District, Santa Cruz Zenzontepec and San Jacinto Tlacotepec municipalities, former Santa María Tlapanalquiahuitl municipality |
| Zapotec, Lachiguiri | zpa | Oaxaca | Jalapa, Magdalena, and Santa María Totolapilla, north of Isthmus, southwest of Guevea de Humboldt in neighboring municipalities |
| Zapotec, San Baltazar Loxicha | zpx | Oaxaca | San Baltazar Loxicha and Santa Catarina Loxicha south of Oaxaca City |
| Zapotec, Santa Inés Yatzechi | zpn | Oaxaca | Zimatlán District |
| Zapotec, Tlacolulita | zpk | Oaxaca | Asunción Tlacolulita and San Juan Alotepec |
| Zapotec, Yatzachi | zav | Oaxaca | Xoochixtepec, Yalina, Yatzachi el Alto, Yatzachi el Bajo, Yohueche, Zoochila, Zoochina |
| Zapotec, Asunción Mixtepec | zoo | Oaxaca | Asunción Mixtepec, 1 other town southwest of Oaxaca City |
| Zapotec, Ayoquesco | zaf | Oaxaca | San Andrés Zabache, San Martín Lachila, Santa Cruz Nexila, Santa María Ayoquesco |
| Zapotec, Cajonos | zad | Oaxaca | San Francisco Cajonos, San Mateo Cajonos, San Miguel Cajonos, San Pablo Yaganiza, San Pedro Cajonos, and Xagacía |
| Zapotec, Chichicapan | zpv | Oaxaca | |
| Zapotec, Choapan | zpc | Oaxaca | from Comaltepec northeast; Veracruz state: Arena and Playa Vicente border area |
| Zapotec, Coatecas Altas | zca | Oaxaca | Ejutla |
| Zapotec, Coatlán | zps | Oaxaca | Santo Domingo Coatlán, 7 towns near Chatino region |
| Zapotec, Elotepec | zte | Oaxaca | 1 village west of Zimatlán |
| Zapotec, Guevea de Humboldt | zpg | Oaxaca | |
| Zapotec, Isthmus | zai | Oaxaca | Juchitán and Tehuantepec |
| Zapotec, Loxicha | ztp | Oaxaca | Candelaria Loxicha, San Agustín Loxicha, San Andrés Paxtlán, San Bartolomé Loxicha, San Francisco Cozoaltepec, San Miguel Suchixtepec, San Pedro el Alto, San Pedro Pochutla, Santa María Colotepec, Santa María Tonameca, Santo Domingo Morelos between Miahuatlán, Pochutla, and Puerto Escondido |
| Zapotec, Mitla | zaw | Oaxaca | Mitla valley |
| Zapotec, Mixtepec | zpm | Oaxaca | |
| Zapotec, Ocotlán | zac | Oaxaca | Ocotlán and Santiago Apóstol areas |
| Zapotec, Ozolotepec | zao | Oaxaca | southeast Miahuatlán, halfway to the coast. Most towns with ‘Ozolotepec’ in the name included, but not San Francisco Ozolotepec |
| Zapotec, Petapa | zpe | Oaxaca | Juchitán District: Santa María Petapa and Santo Domingo Petapa north of the isthmus |
| Zapotec, Quiavicuzas | zpj | Oaxaca | Yautepec District, Guevea de Humboldt municipality, Guadalupe Guevea; Nejapa de Madero municipality, Carrizal, Corral de Piedra, San Juan Lachixila; San Carlos Yautepec municipality, Santiago Quiavicuzas; northeast of Pan-American Highway |
| Zapotec, Rincón | zar | Oaxaca | north |
| Zapotec, San Pedro Quiatoni | zpf | Oaxaca | Salinas, San Pedro Quiatoni, Unión Juárez, and 20 nearby settlements |
| Zapotec, San Vicente Coatlán | zpt | Oaxaca | Ejutla District: San Vicente Coatlán, a municipality town south of Oaxaca City |
| Zapotec, Santa María Quiegolani | zpi | Oaxaca | central |
| Zapotec, Santiago Xanica | zpr | Oaxaca | southeast Miahuatlán, San Andrés Lovene, San Antonio Ozolotepec, Santa María Coixtepec, Santiago Xanica |
| Zapotec, Santo Domingo Albarradas | zas | Oaxaca | San Miguel Albarradas, Santa María Albarradas, Santo Domingo Albarradas |
| Zapotec, Southeastern Ixtlán | zpd | Oaxaca | Benito Juárez, Capulalpan de Morelos, Carrizal, Guelatao de Juárez, Ixtlán de Juárez, La Trinidad, Latuvi, Llano Grande, Natividad, Nevería, San Miguel Amatlán, Santa Catarina Lachatao, Santa María Yavesía (center), Santiago Xiacui |
| Zapotec, Texmelucan | zpz | Oaxaca | west |
| Zapotec, Western Tlacolula Valley | zab | Oaxaca | central |
| Zapotec, Yatee | zty | Oaxaca | San Cristóbal Lachiruáj, San Francisco Yatee, 4 towns |
| Zapotec, Yautepec | zpb | Oaxaca | San Bartolo Yautepec |
| Zapotec, Zaniza | zpw | Oaxaca | Buenavista, El Frijol, Santa María Zaniza, Santiago Textitlán, Santiago Xochiltepec |
| Zapotec, Aloápam | zaq | Oaxaca | San Isidro Aloápam and San Miguel Aloápam |
| Zapotec, Amatlán | zpo | Oaxaca | east of Miahuatlán. 2 towns. |
| Zapotec, El Alto | zpp | Oaxaca | San Andrés el Alto, San Antonino el Alto, San Pedro el Alto |
| Zapotec, Güilá | ztu | Oaxaca | San Dionisio Ocotepec municipality, Matatlán and San Pablo Güilá agencies |
| Zapotec, Lachixío | zpl | Oaxaca | Sola de Vega municipality, San Mateo Mixtepec, San Vicente Lachixío, and Santa María Lachixío |
| Zapotec, Lapaguía-Guivini | ztl | Oaxaca | La Merced del Potrero, Lapaguía, southeast Miahuatlán, San Felipe Lachillo, and San Juan Guivini |
| Zapotec, Mazaltepec | zpy | Oaxaca | Etla District, San Andrés Zautla, San Pedro y San Pablo Etla, Santo Tomás Mazaltepec in Oaxaca valley northwest of Oaxaca City |
| Zapotec, Miahuatlán | zam | Oaxaca | Cuixtla |
| Zapotec, Quioquitani-Quierí | ztq | Oaxaca | Yautepec municipality, San Pedro Leapi, Santa Catalina Quierí, Santa Catarina Quioquitani, Santiago Lachivía, Santo Domingo Lachivitó, Santo Tomás Quierí |
| Zapotec, San Agustín Mixtepec | ztm | Oaxaca | Miahuatlán and San Agustín Mixtepec |
| Zapotec, Santa Catarina Albarradas | ztn | Oaxaca | Santa Catarina Albarradas (also known as San Antonio Albarradas) |
| Zapotec, Sierra de Juárez | zaa | Oaxaca | north |
| Zapotec, Southern Rincón | zsr | Oaxaca | |
| Zapotec, Tabaa | zat | Oaxaca | |
| Zapotec, Tejalapan | ztt | Oaxaca | Etla District: San Felipe Tejalapan |
| Zapotec, Tilquiapan | zts | Oaxaca | Ocotlán and San Miguel Tilquiapan |
| Zapotec, Totomachapan | zph | Oaxaca | west; 2 towns |
| Zapotec, Xadani | zax | Oaxaca | Pochutla District, San Miguel del Puerto municipality, Santa María Xadani. 16 towns. |
| Zapotec, Xanaguía | ztg | Oaxaca | southeast Miahuatlán, San Francisco Ozolotepec, and San José Ozolotepec, Santa Catarina Xanaguía |
| Zapotec, Yalálag | zpu | Oaxaca | Yalálag; Oaxaca City |
| Zapotec, Yareni | zae | Oaxaca | |
| Zapotec, Zaachila | ztx | Oaxaca | south Oaxaca City, San Bartolo Coyotepec, San Pablo Cuatro Venados, San Raymundo Jalpan, Santa María Coyotepec, Zaachila |
| Zapotec, Zoogocho | zpq | Oaxaca | Oaxaca City, Tabehua, Yalina, Zoogocho |
| Chinantec, Quiotepec | chq | Oaxaca | Etla District, San Juan Bautista Atatlah; Ixtlán District, San Juan Quiotepec, Reforma, Maninaltepec, San Pedro Yolox, and Rosario Temextitlán |
| Chinantec, Chiltepec | csa | Oaxaca | San José Chiltepec |
| Chinantec, Ozumacín | chz | Oaxaca | Ayotzintepec, San Pedro Ozumacín, and Santiago Progreso |
| Chinantec, Comaltepec | cco | Oaxaca | Santiago Comaltepec, Soledad Tectitlán, La Esperanza, San Martín Soyolapan, Vista Hermosa (Quiotepec), San Pedro Yolox, Rosario Temextitlán, Maninaltepec |
| Chinantec, Lalana | cnl | Oaxaca and Veracruz | Lalana municipality, 25 towns; Jocotepec and Petlapa municipalities |
| Chinantec, Ojitlán | chj | Oaxaca | San Lucas Ojitlán, 4 towns and 15 hamlets; Hidalgotitlán, Minatitlán, and Veracruz municipalities. Most relocated because a dam flooded their land in 1991. |
| Chinantec, Palantla | cpa | Oaxaca | San Juan Palantla and more than 21 towns |
| Chinantec, Sochiapam | cso | Oaxaca | Cuicatlán, Retumbadero, San Juan Zapotitlán, San Juan Zautla, San Pedro Sochiapan, and Santiago Quetzalapa |
| Chinantec, Tlacoatzintepec | ctl | Oaxaca | San Juan Bautista Tlacoatzintepec, San Juan Zapotitlán, San Pedro Alianza, Santiago Quetzalapa |
| Chinantec, Usila | cuc | Oaxaca | San Felipe Usila plus 12 towns; Pueblo Doce, Veracruz |
| Chinantec, Valle Nacional | cvn | Oaxaca | San Mateo Yetla in San Juan Bautista Valle Nacional |
| Chinantec, Lealao | cle | Oaxaca | La Hondura, Latani, San Juan Lealao, and Tres Arroyos |
| Chinantec, Tepetotutla | cnt | Oaxaca | El Naranjal, San Antonio del Barrio, San Pedro Tlatepusco, Santa Cruz Tepetotutla, Santo Tomás Texas, and Vega del Sol |
| Chinantec, Tepinapa | cte | Oaxaca | Choapan District, San Juan Petlapa municipality, San Juan Toavela, Santa Isabel Cajonos and Santa María Lovani; Santiago Jocotepec municipality, Linda Vista, San Pedro Tepinapa Comunal (locally known as Monte de Oro), and San Pedro Tepinapa Ejidal |
| Matlatzinca, Atzingo | ocu | México | Ocuilan Municipality, San Juan Atzingo, Santa Lucía del Progreso |
| Matlatzinca, San Francisco | mat | México | San Francisco de los Ranchos |
| Mazahua, Central | maz | México, Michoacán, and Querétaro | México border area; northwest Michoacán; Querétaro state: southern tip |
| Mazahua, Michoacán | mmc | Michoacán | east of Ciudad Hidalgo |
| Otomi, Ixtenco | otz | Tlaxcala and Puebla | Tlaxcala state: El Carmen Tequexquitla municipality, dialect of San Juan Bautista Ixtenco; Puebla state: Heróica Puebla de Zaragoza, Tepeaca, and Tepatlaxco municipalities |
| Otomi, Eastern Highland | otm | Hidalgo, Puebla, and Veracruz | Hidalgo state: Huehuetla, Otomí de la Sierra Baja, Otomi-Tepehua, and San Bartolo Tutotepec municipalities; Puebla state: Pahuatlan, Pantepec, Tlacuilotepec, Tlaxco municipalities; Veracruz state: Ixhuatlan de Madero and Tlachichilco municipalities |
| Otomí, Estado de México | ots | México | Chapa de Mota, San Bartolo Morelos, San Felipe Santiago, and Santa Clara de Juárez |
| Otomi, Querétaro | otq | Querétaro, Michoacán, and Guanajuato | Querétaro state: Amealco de Bonfil Municipality, San Ildefonso and Santiago Mexquititlán; Michoacán: Las Delores area; México state: Acambay municipality; southeast Guanajuato, small border area |
| Otomi, Tenango | otn | Hidalgo and Puebla | San Nicolás |
| Otomi, Mezquital | ote | Hidalgo | Mezquital valley; México state: north border |
| Otomi, Temoaya | ott | México | Temoaya municipality, Enthavi, Jiquipilco el Viejo, San Pedro Abajo, San Pedro Arriba, Solalpan. 16 communities. |
| Otomi, Texcatepec | otx | Veracruz | Texcatepec municipality, Ayotuxtla, Texcatepec, Tzicatlán; Zontecomatlán municipality, Amajac and Hueytepec |
| Otomi, Tilapa | otl | México | Santiago Tilapa, between Mexico City and Toluca |
| Pame, Central | pbs | Querétaro and San Luis Potosí | Querétaro state: El Madrono area; San Luis Potosí state: Lagunillas, Santa Catarina, and Santa María Acapulco |
| Pame, Northern | pmq | San Luis Potosí | Alaquines, Ciudad del Maíz, Rayón, Tamasopo municipalities |
| Pame, Southern | pmz | México | Jiliapan area; possibly Hidalgo state |
| Chichimeco-Jonaz | pei | Guanajuato | San Luis de la Paz, Jonáz village |
| Chiapanec | cip | Chiapas | El Bosque, Las Margaritas, Ocosingo, Alenque, Sabanilla municipalities |
| Me’phaa, Azoyú | tpc | Guerrero | Azoyú municipality, Macahuite, Maxmadí, Toxnene, and Zapotitlán de la Fuente |
| Me’phaa, Tlacoapa | tpl | Guerrero | Tlacoapa municipality, Laguna Seca, Sabana, Tenamazapa, Tlacoapa, Tlacotepec and Totomixtlahuaca |
| Me’phaa, Acatepec | tpx | Guerrero | Acatepec municipality, Acatepec, Apetzuca, Barranca Pobre, Caxitepec, El Fuereño, Escalería ZapataLlano Grande, Mezcaltepec, Tres Cruces, Xilotlancingo; Ayutla municipality, El Camlote, El Salto and Plan de Gatica; Zapotitlán municipality (and dialect), Escalería Lagunas, Huixtlazala, Zapotitlán Tablas; Atlixtac municipality, Huitzapula (and dialect); Atlixtac municipality (Teocuitlapa dialect), Caxitepec, Tonalapa, and Zoquitlán; Quechultenango municipality, El Tojoruco, Nanzintla, and Platanillo |
| Me’phaa, Malinaltepec | tcf | Guerrero | Acapulco municipality, San Martín del Jovero; Atlamajalcingo del Monte municipality, Huehuetepec, San Isidro Labrador and Zilacayotitlán; Iliatenco municipality, Alchipáhuac, and Aserradero, Cruztomáhuac, Iliatenco and San José Vista Hermosa; Malinaltepec municipality, Colombia de Guadalupe, El Rincón, El Tejocote, Malinaltepec, Moyotepec, Ojo de Agua, Paraje Montero, Tierra Colorada; San Luis Acatlán municipality, Pascala del Oro and Pueblo Hidalgo; Metlatónoc municipality, Francisco I. Madero, Juanacatlán and San Juan Puerto Montaña; Tlapa municipality, Las Pilas, San Pedro Acatlán and Santa María Tonaya |
| Mangue | mom | Nicaragua, Costa Rica, Honduras, El Salvador | |
| Subtiaba | sut | Nicaragua | |

== See also ==
- Classification of Mixtec languages
- Municipalities of Oaxaca
- List of Mayan languages
