= Santiago, Oaxaca =

Santiago, Oaxaca may refer to:

- Santiago Amoltepec
- Santiago Apoala
- Santiago Apóstol
- Santiago Astata
- Santiago Atitlán
- Santiago Ayuquililla
- Santiago Cacaloxtepec
- Santiago Camotlán
- Santiago Chazumba
- Santiago Choapam
- Santiago Comaltepec
- Santiago del Río
- Santiago Huajolotitlán
- Santiago Huauclilla
- Santiago Ihuitlán Plumas
- Santiago Ixcuintepec
- Santiago Ixtayutla
- Santiago Jamiltepec
- Santiago Jocotepec
- Santiago Juxtlahuaca
- Santiago Lachiguiri
- Santiago Lalopa
- Santiago Laollaga
- Santiago Laxopa
- Santiago Llano Grande
- Santiago Matatlán
- Santiago Miltepec
- Santiago Minas
- Santiago Nacaltepec
- Santiago Nejapilla
- Santiago Niltepec
- Santiago Nundiche
- Santiago Nuyoó
- Santiago Suchilquitongo
- Santiago Tamazola
- Santiago Tapextla
- Santiago Tenango
- Santiago Tepetlapa
- Santiago Tetepec
- Santiago Texcalcingo
- Santiago Textitlán
- Santiago Tilantongo
- Santiago Tillo
- Santiago Tlazoyaltepec
- Santiago Xanica
- Santiago Xiacuí
- Santiago Yaitepec
- Santiago Yaveo
- Santiago Yolomécatl
- Santiago Yosondúa
- Santiago Yucuyachi
- Santiago Zacatepec
- Santiago Zoochila
