= Zapoteco de Valles, del noreste =

Zapoteco de Valles, del noreste is a name used by INALI for a variety of Zapotec recognized by the Mexican government. It corresponds to two ISO languages:

- Santo Domingo Albarradas Zapotec (ISO 639-3: zas)
- Santa Catarina Albarradas Zapotec (ISO 639-3: ztn)

== See also ==
- Zapoteco
