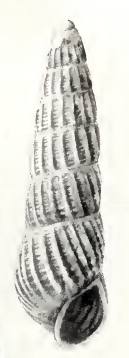
- Drawing of a shell of Turbonilla bartolomensis

Scientific classification
- Kingdom: Animalia
- Phylum: Mollusca
- Class: Gastropoda
- Family: Pyramidellidae
- Genus: Turbonilla
- Species: T. bartolomensis

Binomial name
- Turbonilla bartolomensis Bartsch, 1917

Synonyms
- Turbonilla (Pyrgiscus) bartolomensis Bartsch, 1917

= Turbonilla bartolomensis =

Species of gastropod

Turbonilla bartolomensis is a species of sea snail, a marine gastropod mollusk in the family Pyramidellidae, the pyrams and their allies.

== Description ==
The yellow shell has a conic shape. Its length measures 5.6 mm. The whorls of the protoconch are decollated. The nine whorls of the teleoconch are appressed at the summit, flattened in the middle, except the last, which is inflated and strongly rounded. The whorls are marked by rather strong, well-rounded axial ribs, which are slightly retractively slanting on the early turns and decidedly so on the later volutions. The intercostal spaces about as wide as the ribs marked by 12 deeply incised spiral pits. Of these the fifth is a mere line, while the first four, the sixth, ninth, and tenth are about twice as wide, and the eighth and ninth and eleventh and twelfth form deep broad pits fully three times the width of the last. The suture is moderately constricted. The periphery of the body whorl is strongly inflated, and well rounded. The base of the shell is short, inflated, and well rounded. It is marked by the continuations of the axial ribs, which extend strongly to the umbilical area, between which poorly defined spiral striations may be seen. The aperture is short and broadly oval. The posterior angle is obtuse. The outer lip is thin, showing the external sculpture within. The inner lip is short, partly reflected, free, and provided with an obsolete oblique internal fold at its insertion. The parietal wall is covered by a very thick callus, which renders the peristome complete.

== Distribution ==
The type specimen was found in the Pacific Ocean off San Bartolome Bay, Baja California.
