= ZTU =

ZTU or ztu may refer to:

- Zaqatala International Airport in Azerbaijan (IATA airport code ZTU)
- Güilá Zapotec a Zapotec language of Oaxaca, Mexico (ISO 639-3 code ztu)
