= Santa Inés Yatzeche =

- Municipality and town
- Location in Mexico
- Coordinates: 16°48′N 96°45′W
- Country: Mexico
- State: Oaxaca

Area
  - Total: 11.48 km^{2} (4.43 sq mi)

Population (2005)
  - Total: 975
- Time zone: UTC-6 (Central Standard Time)

Santa Inés Yatzeche is a town and municipality in Oaxaca in southeastern Mexico and is the third smallest municipality in Oaxaca behind Santa Cruz Amilpas and Natividad.

== History ==
The community, which lies on the Atoyac River in the southern Valle Grande, has a long history. Archaeological studies have shown that it was a flourishing center for hundreds of years before the rise of Monte Albán around 500, when it suffered a loss of 75% of its population.

== Population ==
The community is now relatively poor. As of 2000, only 7% of households earned more than twice the minimum wage. Most of the inhabitants, who speak Zapotec, had not completed six years of education. The villagers must travel to Zimatlán to sell produce, and to Oaxaca City to obtain wage-paying work. As of 2005, the total population was 975, of whom 908 spoke an indigenous language, living in 210 homes.

== Geography ==
The municipality covers an area of 11.48 km^{2} at an average elevation of 1,460 meters above sea level. It is part of the Zimatlán District of the Valles Centrales region. The climate is temperate and main economic activity is agriculture and livestock husbandry.
