= Tonto River =

Coordinates: 18°13′59″N 96°24′45″W

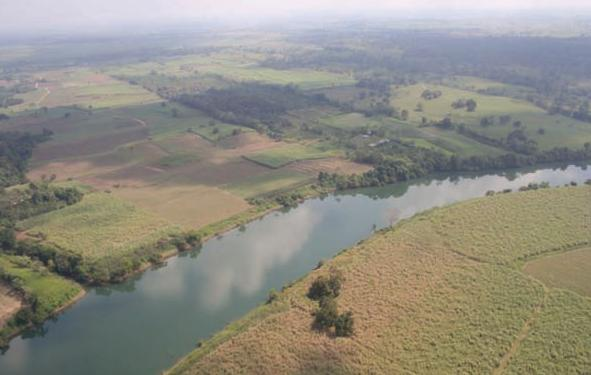
- Rio Tonto

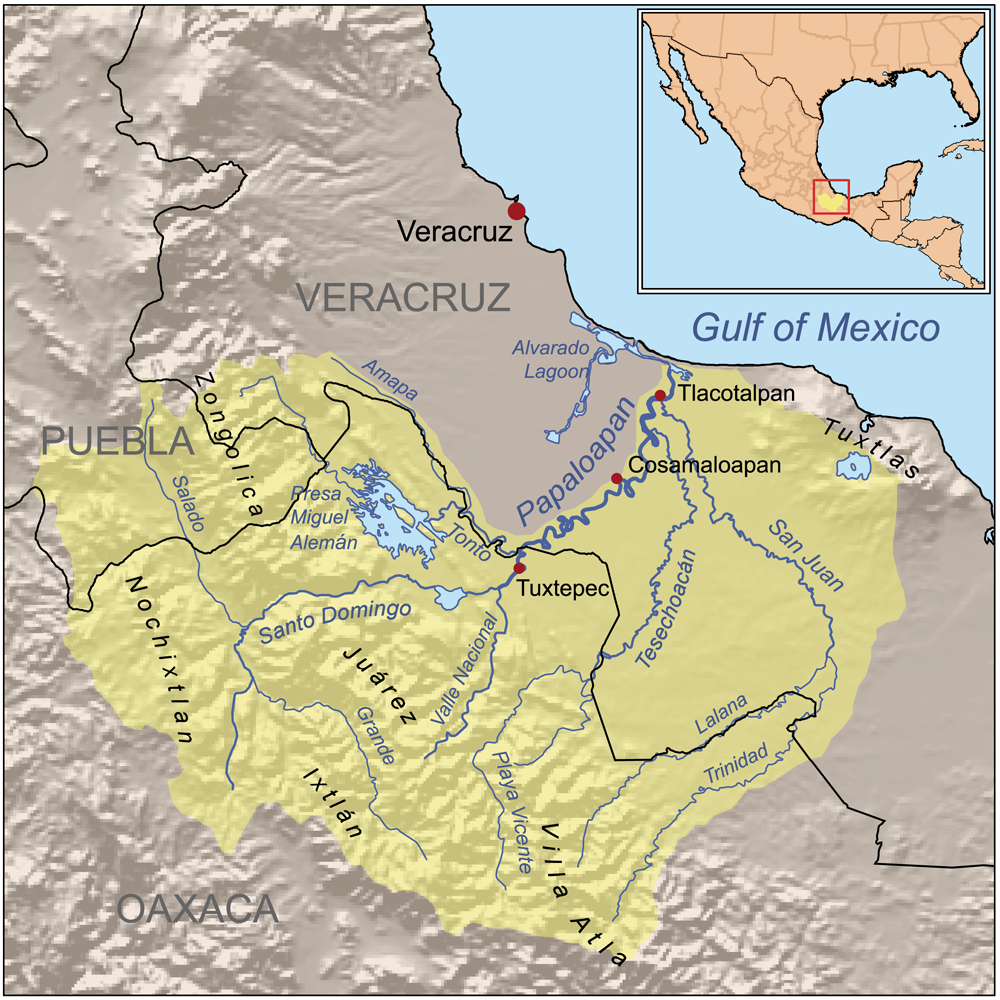
- The Tonto River is in the northwestern part of the Papaloapan River drainage basin

Location
- Country: Mexico

The Tonto River is a river of Oaxaca, Mexico that flows from the mountains of Zongolica. It is dammed by the Miguel Alemán Dam near the town of Temascal or Nuevo Soyaltepec, forming the Miguel Alemán Lake. Below the dam, the river flows southeast past San Juan Bautista Tuxtepec, where it joins the Santo Domingo River to form the Papaloapan River.

== See also ==
- List of rivers of Mexico
