= Tilquiapan Zapotec =

Oto-Manguean language of Oaxaca, Mexico

- San Miguel Tilquiápam
- Region: Oaxaca in Mexico
- Native speakers: 5,000 (2007)
- Language family: Oto-Manguean: Zapotecan; Zapotec; Central; Valley; Tilquiapan–Yatzechi; Tilquiapan Zapotec
- Writing system: Latin script

Language codes
- ISO 639-3: zts
- Glottolog: tilq1235

Tilquiapan Zapotec (Zapoteco de San Miguel Tilquiápam) is an Oto-Manguean language of the Zapotecan branch, spoken in southern Oaxaca, Mexico.

Santa Inés Yatzechi Zapotec is close enough to be considered a dialect, and Ocotlán Zapotec is also close. They were measured at 87% and 59% intelligibility, respectively, in recorded text testing.

== Phonology ==
=== Vowels ===
Vowel phonemes of Tilquiapan Zapotec
	Front	Central	Back
Close	i	ɨ	u
Mid	ɘ		o
Open	a		

Each vowel can also be glottalized, a phenomenon manifested as either creaky voice throughout the vowel or, more commonly, as a sequence of a vowel and a glottal stop optionally followed by an echo of the vowel.

=== Consonants ===
Consonant phonemes of Tilquiapan Zapotec
	Bilabial		Dental/ Alveolar		Post- alveolar		Palatal	Velar			
	Bilabial		Dental/ Alveolar		Post- alveolar		Palatal	plain		labialized	
Nasal	m		n / nː								
Plosive	p	b	t	d	tʃ	dʒ		k	ɡ	kʷ	ɡʷ
Fricative			s	z	ʃ	ʒ					
Tap			ɾ								
Approximant					l / l͡d		j				

As with other Zapotec languages, the primary distinction between consonant pairs like /t/ and /d/ is not of voicing but between fortis and lenis (measured in length), respectively, with voicing being a phonetic correlate. There are two exceptions to this in Tilquiapan:

- The contrast between fortis /nː/ and lenis /n/
- The contrast between fortis /ld/ and lenis /l/

Neither is voiceless, but /nː/ is pronounced a little longer and /ld/ replaces /l/ in certain causative verbs in ways similar to other fortis/lenis consonantal changes (e.g. [blaˀa] 'get loose' vs. [bldaˀa] 'let loose').

/nː/ is not differentiated from /n/ in orthography. Word-final lenis /n/ is realized as [ŋ].

/b/ and /d/ have fricative allophones [β] and [ð] intervocalically.

/ɾ/ before a consonant is [ɹ].

/ɡʷ/ varies between [ɡʷ] ~ [ɣʷ] ~ [w], and /ɡ/ between [ɡ] ~ [ɣ].

/ʃ ʒ/ have retroflex allophones [ʂ ʐ] occurring before /a u/, while [ʃ ʒ] are typically occurring before /i/.
