= Yatzeche Zapotec =

Zapotec language of Oaxaca, Mexico

- (Santa Inés Yatzeche)
- Zegache Zapotec (Santa Ana Zagache)
- Native to: Mexico
- Region: Oaxaca
- Native speakers: (2,200 cited 1990 census)
- Language family: Oto-Manguean: Zapotecan; Zapotec; Central; Valley; Tilquiapan–Yatzeche; Yatzeche Zapotec

Language codes
- ISO 639-3: zpn
- Glottolog: sant1447

Yatzeche or Zegache Zapotec (Santa Inés Yatzeche Zapotec, Southeastern Zimatlán Zapotec) is a Zapotec language spoken in the Santa Ana Zegache and Santa Inés Yatzeche municipalities of Zimatlán District of Oaxaca, Mexico.

It is 75% intelligible with Ocotlán Zapotec. Tilquiapan Zapotec may be a dialect.
