= Yucuquimi de Ocampo =

- Town
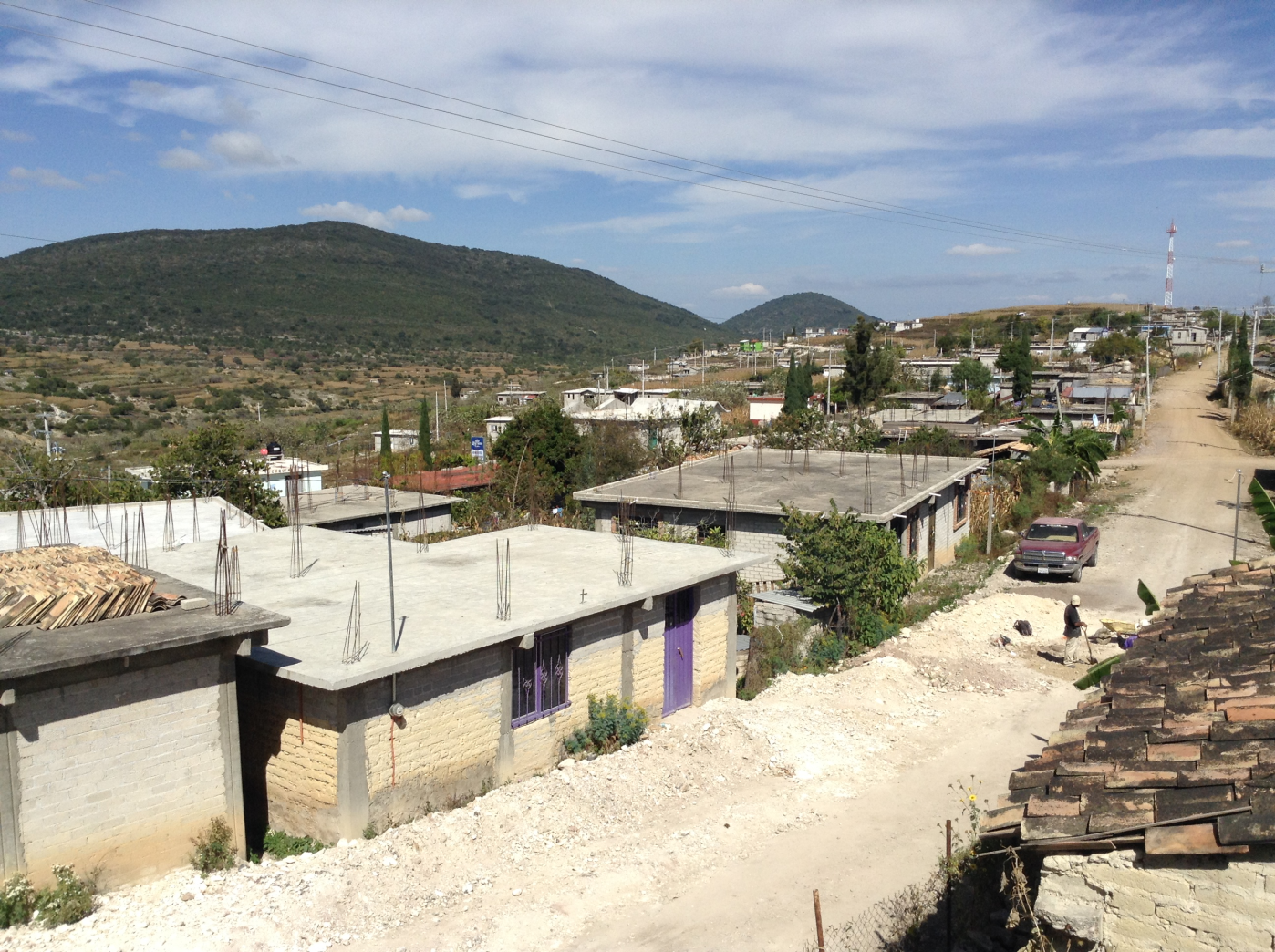
- Buenos Aires neighborhood in Yucuquimi de Ocampo

- Location in the state of Oaxaca, Mexico
- Coordinates: 17°34′50″N 97°53′26″W
- Country: Mexico
- State: Oaxaca
- Elevation: 2,060 m (6,760 ft)

Population (2010 INEGI)
  - Total: 2,260
- Time zone: UTC–6 (Central Standard Time)
  - Summer (DST): UTC-5 (Central Daylight Time)

Yucuquimi de Ocampo is a small town in the municipality of Tezoatlán de Segura y Luna, in the Huajuapan District of the Mixteca Baja region, in the state of Oaxaca, Mexico. Yucuquimi de Ocampo is home to a population of Mixtec people, many of whom still speak the Mixtec language.

== History ==
Yucuquimi de Ocampo's history dates back to pre-Hispanic times.

In September 2019, political conflict arose in the town, with municipal agent Eloina León Vázquez having claimed the government had failed to deliver money and resources that had been promised to the town. The town declared the intent to become an autonomous municipality due to this issue and claims of discrimination and indifference from the state and municipal governments, and inhabitants of the town along with members of the Zapatistas set up a blockade on Federal Highway 190, claiming they would keep the blockade in place until an agreement was reached. Shortly after, forces of the National Guard were sent to the town and surrounding Tezoatlán de Segura y Luna municipality in order to restore government control.

=== Name ===
Yucuquimi de Ocampo's name is derived from the Mixtec phrase yucuquini which is officially translated as "cerro del lucero" in Spanish and roughly means "mountain of the morning star" in English. Many municipal vehicles in Yucuquimi de Ocampo also display the phrase "cerro del lucero" along with an image of a mountain with bright star hovering just above the summit.

== Geography ==
Yucuquimi de Ocampo is located in the mountains of the Mixteca Baja region.

=== Barrios ===
Yucuquimi de Ocampo is made up of five "barrios" or neighborhoods:

- Alta Vista
- Buenos Aires
- Plan de Iguala
- Centro
- Barrio Juarez

Each neighborhood has its own primary school and church building. Centro also holds the town's municipal building and town square were many cultural events are held each year.

== Demographics ==
=== Population ===
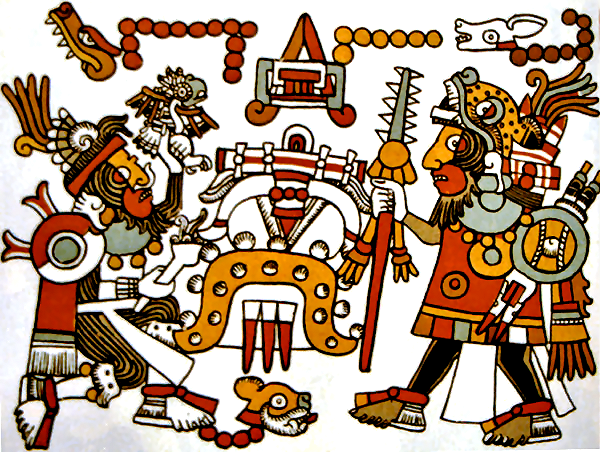
Many of the inhabitants of Yucuquimi de Ocampo are Mixtec

Yucuquimi de Ocampo has a population of 2,260 inhabitants according to data from the INEGI Population and Housing Census of 2010. Of these, 1,024 are men and 1,236 are women.

=== Language ===
Many of the inhabitants of Yucuquimi de Ocampo are Mixtec. The Mixtec Language, specifically Mixteco de Tezoatlán, is spoken by about 86% of the population, according to one estimate. Spanish is also widely spoken here and is officially taught in the schools.

== Community life ==
Yucuquimi de Ocampo is an agricultural community. Many of the town's inhabitants plant corn when the rainy season starts in late May or early June. While a few people have had their fields plowed by a tractor in recent years, the majority still make their own plows and use working animals. The corn is harvested in November and the dried corn stalks are used as feed for the animals. After the corn is harvested, it is stored in large sacks and used to make masa for tortillas.

=== Arts and culture ===
Many of Yucuquimi de Ocampo's inhabitants are skilled artisans, specializing in making articles out of dried palm leaves (see Basket weaving). The people commonly make such things as floor mats, baskets, hats, ropes, fire fans and toys.

=== Recreation ===
Basketball has become very popular among the youth of Yucuquimi de Ocampo in recent years. As a result, there are many public basketball courts around town. The local schools even form basketball teams and play against other schools in the area.

== Infrastructure ==
Yucuquimi de Ocampo is mostly made up of dirt roads. There is only one paved road that connects it with other small towns nearby; San Andrés Yutatío to the North and San Marcos de Garzón to the West. The paved road passes through the Buenos Aires neighborhood.
