= Albarradas Sign Language =

Deaf sign language of Mexico

- Didxa ná’
- Native to: Mexico
- Region: Oaxaca
- Native speakers: some members of a community of 1,000
- Language family: village sign language

Language codes
- ISO 639-3: lsc
- Glottolog: alba1273
- Various sign languages of Turtle Island (North America), excluding Francosign languages. Didxa ná’ is labelled in black as #4.

Albarradas Sign Language, also known as Didxa ná’, is an indigenous village sign language of Mexico. It arose approximately 150 years ago in the Zapotec villages of Santa Catarina Albarradas, San Antonio Albarradas and possibly one other nearby town, due to a high incidence of congenital deafness.

== See also ==
- Santa Catarina Albarradas Zapotec
