= San Felipe Usila =

- Municipality and town
- Location in Mexico
- Coordinates: 17°53′N 96°31′W
- Country: Mexico
- State: Oaxaca

Area
  - Total: 255.17 km^{2} (98.52 sq mi)

Population (2005)
  - Total: 11,642
- Time zone: UTC-6 (Central Standard Time)

San Felipe Usila is a town and municipality in Oaxaca in south-western Mexico. The municipality covers an area of 255.17 km^{2}. It is part of the Tuxtepec District of the Papaloapan Region.

As of 2005, the municipality had a total population of 11,642.

== History ==
The name Usila, also spelled Ucila, derives from the Nahuatl Huitzillan, meaning "place of the hummingbird". Its name in Chinantec is Geugeín. Usila, or Huitzillan, was a prehispanic Chinantec settlement. Cacao and cotton were grown here in addition to the typical Mesoamerican crops of maize, squash, beans, and chile. In order to participate in the main religious festival of the year, one had to undertake a 140-day fast from any ritually impure acts and from all food besides tortillas, a small amount of cooked maize and tobacco. One ceremony celebrated biannually in the spring and fall involved the sacrifice of a child who had never sinned, a turkey, a dog and a cat. The occasion was met with the burning of copal, dancing, and feasting on the flesh of slaves who had been purchased for the occasion.

Usila was conquered by the Aztec Empire, probably by Moctezuma I. It sent tribute of cacao, gold, cotton, maize, beans, chiles, mantas, mats and fruit to the Mexica governor at Tuxtepec, and gold and feather adornments directly to Tenochtitlan. It waged war against Tlacoatzintepec and Tepetotutla, other Chinantec settlements located to the southwest and south respectively.
