= List of Mayan languages =

The Mayan languages are a group of languages spoken by the Maya peoples. The Maya form a group of approximately 7 million people who are descended from an ancient Mesoamerican civilization and spread across the modern-day countries of: Mexico, Belize, Guatemala, Honduras, and El Salvador. Speaking descendant languages from their original Proto-Mayan language, some of their languages were recorded in the form of 'glyphs' of a Mayan script.

== Languages ==
The languages are shown along with their population estimates, as available.

| Language | Speakers | Year | Countries |
|---|---|---|---|
| Achi | 120,000 | 2019 census | Guatemala (Baja Verapaz) |
| Akatek | 68,000 | 2019-2020 | Guatemala (Huehuetenango), Mexico (Chiapas) |
| Awakatek | 10,100 | 2019 census | Guatemala (Huehuetenango), Mexico |
| Chicomuceltec | 0 | extinct | Guatemala (Huehuetenango), Mexico (Chiapas) |
| Chontal | 60,563 | 2020 census | Mexico (Tabasco) |
| Chuj | 63,000 | 2019-2020 | Guatemala (Huehuetenango), Mexico (Chiapas) |
| Chʼol | 254,715 | 2020 census | Mexico (Chiapas) |
| Chʼoltiʼ | 0 | extinct | Guatemala, Belize |
| Chʼortiʼ | 30,000 | 2000 | Guatemala, Honduras |
| Coxoh | 0 | extinct | Mexico (Chiapas) |
| Itzaʼ | 36 | 2023 | Guatemala (El Petén) |
| Ixil | 120,000 | 2019 census | Guatemala (El Quiché), Mexico |
| Jakaltek | 33,000 | 2019 | Guatemala (Huehuetenango), Mexico (Chiapas), |
| Kaqchikel | 410,000 | 2019 census | Guatemala, Mexico (Chiapas) |
| Kʼicheʼ | 1,055,407 | 2020 | Guatemala, Mexico |
| Lacandon | 770 | 2020 | Mexico (Chiapas) |
| Mam | 610,000 | 2019-2020 | Guatemala, Mexico (Chiapas) |
| Maya (Yucatec) | 812,633 | 2010-2014 | Mexico, Belize |
| Mochoʼ | 126 | 2020 | Mexico (Chiapas) |
| Mopan | 13,000 | 2014-2019 | Belize, Guatemala (El Petén) |
| Poqomam | 11,000 | 2019 census | Guatemala |
| Poqomchiʼ | 130,000 | 2019 census | Guatemala (Alta Verapaz, Baja Verapaz, El Quiché) |
| Qʼanjobʼal | 180,000 | 2019 | Guatemala (Huehuetenango), Mexico (Chiapas) |
| Qʼeqchiʼ | 1,371,606 | 2020 | Guatemala, Belize, Mexico |
| Sakapultek | 6,500 | 2019 | Guatemala (El Quiché) |
| Sipakapense | 4,200 | 2019 census | Guatemala (San Marcos) |
| Tektitek | 3,100 | 2019 | Guatemala (Huehuetenango), Mexico (Chiapas) |
| Tének | 168,729 | 2020 census | Mexico (San Luis Potosi, Veracruz) |
| Tojol-abʼal | 67,000 | 2020 census | Mexico (Chiapas) |
| Tzeltal | 589,144 | 2020 census | Mexico (Chiapas) |
| Tzotzil | 550,274 | 2020 census | Mexico (Chiapas) |
| Tzʼutujil | 72,000 | 2019 census | Guatemala |
| Uspantek | 5,100 | 2019 | Guatemala (El Quiché) |

In addition, Chalchitek is considered by some to be a distinct language, while others consider it a dialect of Awakatek.

== See also ==
- Mesoamerican languages
- Mesoamerican Linguistic Area
- List of Oto-Manguean languages
