= Zenzontepec Chatino =

Zapotecan language of Oaxaca, Mexico

- Northern Chatino
- Native to: Mexico
- Region: Oaxaca
- Native speakers: (8,500 cited 2000)
- Language family: Oto-Manguean: Zapotecan; Chatino; Zenzontepec Chatino

Language codes
- ISO 639-3: czn
- Glottolog: zenz1235
- ELP: Zenzontepec Chatino

Zenzontepec Chatino, also known as Northern Chatino, or "Chatino Occidental Alto" is an indigenous Mesoamerican language, one of the Chatino family of the Oto-Manguean languages. It is not intelligible with other Chatino languages. It is spoken by one of the most isolated groups in Oaxaca, the Chatino people in the municipalities of Santa Cruz Zenzontepec and San Jacinto Tlacotepec, and in the former municipality of Santa María Tlapanalquiahuitl.

== Phonology ==
Zenzontepec Chatino has 5 vowels: /a, e, i, o, u/. Vowels may be oral or nasal, and there is a contrast between short and long vowels.

Consonants
	Bilabial	Dental	Alveolar		Palato-alveolar	Palatal	Velar			Glottal
	Bilabial	Dental	plain	palatalized	Palato-alveolar	Palatal	plain	palatalized	labialized	Glottal
Stop	p	t /t̪/		ty /tʲ/			k	ky /kʲ/	kw /kʷ/	ʔ
Affricate			tz /t͡s/		ch /t͡ʃ/					
Fricative			s		x /ʃ/					j /h/
Nasal	m	n /n̪/		ny /nʲ/						
Approximant	b /β̞/	l /l̪/		ly /lʲ/		y /j/			w	
Flap			r /ɾ/							

Stops and affricates are voiced when preceded by a nasal consonant, but are otherwise voiceless.

Zenzontepec Chatino has predictable stem-final stress.

In native vocabulary, the only permissible coda is the glottal stop. Phonological evidence, including evidence from a play language, suggests that the glottal stop of word-medial ʔC clusters belongs to the onset of the following syllable rather than the coda of the preceding syllable, and therefore true codas are only found word-finally.

== Tone ==
Zenzontepec Chatino's tone bearing unit is the mora, and each mora may be assigned a mid tone /M/, a high tone /H/, or be unspecified for tone /Ø/. In practical orthographies, tones are often indicated by accents over vowels: acute accents for /H/ tones, macrons or grave accents for /M/ tones, and no accent if tone is unspecified.

On words with two or more moras (polysyllabic words or monosyllabic words with long vowels) different combinations of tones can be found (/ØØ/, /ØM/, /MH/, /HØ/, and /HM/), some of which are morphologically specialized (/ØH/ and /MM/ which only appear on words inflected for second person singular), while others do not occur (/MØ/ and /HH/).

=== Tone processes ===
The high tone /H/ (but not the mid tone /M/) will spread through following toneless moras until coming into contact another /H/ or /M/ tone or the end of an intonational phrase. The /M/ or /H/ tones that the spreading /H/ tone runs in to will be downstepped phonetically, but will remain /M/ or /H/ phonologically. /M/ tones on monomoraic enclitics will become /H/ tones if its host's tone is /M/ or /ØM/.

== Play language ==
Speakers of Zenzontepec Chatino formerly used a play language called nchakwiʔ tsūʔ ntīlú 'speaking backwards' in which a word's first syllable was transposed to the end of the word, and its tones were replaced with /HØ/.
