= San Pablo Tijaltepec =

- Municipality and town
- Location in Mexico
- Coordinates: 17°01′N 97°31′W
- Country: Mexico
- State: Oaxaca
- Time zone: UTC-6 (Central Standard Time)

San Pablo Tijaltepec is a town and municipality in Oaxaca in south-western Mexico. The municipality covers an area of km^{2}. It is part of the Tlaxiaco District in the south of the Mixteca Region.

As of 2005, the municipality had a total population of .
