= San Mateo Sindihui =

- Municipality and town
- Location within Mexico Location within North America
- Coordinates: 17°0′N 97°21′W
- Country: Mexico
- State: Oaxaca

Area
  - Total: 181.17 km^{2} (69.95 sq mi)

Population (2000)
  - Total: 1,945
- Time zone: UTC-6 (Central Standard Time)

San Mateo Sindihui is a town and municipality in Oaxaca in south-western Mexico. The municipality covers an area of 181.17 km^{2}. It is part of the Nochixtlán District in the southeast of the Mixteca Region.

As of 2005, the municipality had a total population of 1,945.
