= Santiago Yosondúa =

Coordinates: 16°53′N 97°34′W

- Municipality and town
- Interactive map of Santiago Yosondúa
- Country: Mexico
- State: Oaxaca

Area
  - Municipality and town: 215.61 km^{2} (83.25 sq mi)

Population (2005)
  - Municipality and town: 7,197
  - Urban: 1,674
- Time zone: UTC-6 (Central Standard Time)
- Postal code: 71180

Santiago Yosondúa is a municipality and town located in the State of Oaxaca in southwestern Mexico. The municipality covers an area of 215.61 km^{2} and is part of the Tlaxiaco District in the south of the Mixteca Region. The actual town of Santiago Yosondúa lies approximately 95 km to the southeast of Oaxaca de Juárez and 70 km south of Tlaxiaco. The municipality is recognized as the top municipality in the district with three municipal agencies housed there.

== Topography and climate ==
Santiago Yosondúa sits in the center of the Sierra Madre de Oaxaca mountain range, an area of varying elevation. The region consists of flat plains, inclines of between 45 and 70 degrees, and large ravines with sheer drops of up to 90 degrees. These differences in physiography and topography result in varying microclimates throughout Santiago Yosondúa.

In general, the temperature in the municipality can range from 12 to 26 Celsius and the precipitation from 1000 to 2000 millimeters, with an average temperature of 18.9 Celsius and an average annual precipitation of 1409 millimeters. Summer runs from June to September and is the wet season and usually foggy. The dry months are from January to May, with the coldest temperatures in December and January when frost can appear. In the southern part of Yosondúa, the climate can vary from sub-humid to semi-dry.

During February, March, and sometimes April, high winds can occur. For instance, in Atalaya there have been large tornadoes that caused destruction to homes, and other tornadoes have occurred in Alacrán, Imperio, Cabecera de Cañada, Primavera, and San Miguel Ixcatlán.

== Early history ==
There is limited knowledge of the early history of Santiago Yosondúa, and most of what is known comes from oral histories and the few material objects found in caves and lands in the region. These include constructed graves, shrines, idols, polished green stones, flint beads, obsidian arrowheads, stone axes, grinding wheels, metates (stone grinding tables), and molcajetes (mortars and pestles). Scattered ceramic fragments are found all over the town's territory and are inferred to be from the upper Neolithic and Paleolithic era.

The upper Mixtec population's settlements of San José Mogote and Monte Albán date back to 1500-500 BCE and are examples of early villages on top of hills in the Valley of Oaxaca. Another settlement – Tlaxiaco, also known as Ndiji Nuu, meaning "he who has good eyesight or can look far away" – was located on top of a tall hill next to the Yuta Toto River, where a temple of the gods is also situated. It is believed that the name was either related to an Aztec surveillance post used to control the Mixtec people, or to the fact that the settlement was located on the top of a hill where its inhabitants had a clear view into the distance. The ruins of this settlement are mostly located in Jaha Nuu or Yuku Yuu, and the current residents are seeking to protect it from looting.

At a folkloric level, a very simplified retelling of Santiago Yosondúa's founding recounts how a primitive man, traveling in search of subsistence, settled on the top and the slopes of the mountain Jañuu, next to the Esmeralda River. At first the man depended on roots, wild fruits, and hunting to get by, but as the community grew they were able to access the plains on top of the river's banks to plant crops and irrigate them from the river. As such, the location of Santiago Yosondúa provided both defense and food production for its people.

== Current demographics ==
According to a 2020 census, the municipality has a total population of 7,991 of which 47% are male and 53% female, with children under 14 years of age making up 29% of that population. About 1,800 inhabitants are fluent in at least one indigenous language.

Since Santiago Yosondúa existed before the conquest and colonization of Mexico the community members are categorized as being indigenous, and there are elders in the community who continue to speak Mixteco, a form of resistance to past attempts to erase their culture. For when schools were first being established during 1910 and 1911, indigenous children were taught to only learn and speak in Spanish.

Today, elders who still know their native language mostly do not pass it down to their children, leading to an overall decrease in people speaking Mixteco. However, there is a movement to promote the preservation of Mixteco culture, especially with state recognition of indigenous communities as being legal entities under public law. As a result, there is a demand for bilingual and intercultural education in indigenous communities.

== Use of the land ==
=== Agriculture ===
Many families rely on subsistence agriculture, mostly cultivating corn and bean crops as well as wheat, tomatoes, nopal, pumpkin, chilacayote, oats, and chayote. In the lower areas palm, cane, orange, mango, mamey (a fruit), avocado, banana, and lemon are grown, with the crop of choice varying from community to community. For example, in the Cuajilotes community palm harvesting is given priority, whereas tomato has been cultivated for more than 25 years in Buena Vista and El Vergel, although due to increasing resistance to chemical products there has been an increase in pest incidents and the pest population. The first greenhouse in the Cascade community was erected in 2004 and used for tomato production, followed by two more in the Empire community and one more in Sector 3 of Santiago Yosondúa. Greenhouse tomato production was introduced into the municipality because of its high profitability and potential for the region.

Sugar cane is produced in the Yerbasanta, parts of El Vergel, Santa Catarina Cuanana, and Yollotepéc de la Paz communities, mostly for selling in the Plaza of Santiago Yosondua in November and December. Unfortunately, sugar cane has been affected by the lack of irrigation systems for lands above the river. But starting about 10 years ago, watermelon and melon were cultivated half a hectare away from the community of Yerbasanta, and with the help of solidarity fund programs, nopal has been introduced and cultivated in the Cabandihui community. Wheat and oats are cultivated in the communities of Imperio, Cabecera of Cañada, Cañada de Galicia, Atalaya, Alacrán, Yosondúa, La Casacada, congregation Lázaro Cárdenas and others, with the grain from the wheat used to make flour for bread or to be sold.

=== Livestock ===
Families in Santiago Yosondúa mostly raise sheep, goats, pigs, ranch chickens, bull teams, turkeys, horses, and donkeys. These animals not only help with agricultural activities but also represent savings for the family that can be used in times of sickness or grave accident, as payment of passage for youths who want to immigrate, or to fund significant festivities in the region. Some producers in the Sector 3 communities of Imperio and Vergel are trying to farm heritage breeds of cattle like Holsteins for the production of milk and cheese.

=== Forestry ===
The greatest use of wood from the forest is as firewood, primarily fallen-down trunks and dead pinocote, oak, or strawberry trees. But sometimes the lower branches are cut to prevent killing the tree and are stored for later use during the rainy season. Pear and peach are planted in temperate zones, along with mamey, banana, coffee, mango, black sapote, avocado, red plum, orange, lemon, medlar, papaya, and lime.

=== Important rivers ===
The Esmeralda river supplies water to the communities of Waterfall, Cabandihui, and El Vergel, and during the months of February and April has a width of 50 cm and a depth of 15 cm. However, it is contaminated with human rubbish from the municipality such as bags, bottles, and soap, which affects five communities: Centro Yosondúa, La Cascada, Cabandihui, El Vergel, and Cuajilote.

The Palomita river is a permanent river that comes from the north of the municipality and goes through communities in the Congregación Lázaro Cárdenas. It joins with other runoffs that eventually merge with the Esmeralda River.

The Cacalote river goes through the community of Lázaro Cárdenas and also joins the Esmeralda River, although it shrinks a lot during the dry season.

The Yutamá river joins with the Esmeralda River near the Tecomate river, but since it is far away from homes it is hardly used. During April the river is 30 to 50 cm deep and 2 meters wide, and in some parts natural deep ponds are formed.

The Tecomate river comes from the Esmeralda and the Yutamá rivers, and like the Yutamá is hardly used. It is 80 cm deep and 1 to 2 meters wide, but can be up to 3 meters wide during the dry season, when the bulk of the region's rain falls.

The Rió de Cañada y Yutiangito river is formed during the rainy season and usually stops until April or May. It joins the Cuanana river, but as its flow is intermittent it is hardly used.

The Cuanana river is used more than the other rivers, both for irrigation of neighbouring lands and for the extraction of sand and gravel by the Santa Catarina Cuanana and Yolotepéc agencies. The river is 12 meters wide and 80 cm deep, but can be up to 1 meter deep during March. Like many other rivers, its flow increases during the rainy season when it can be up to 3 meters deep.

== Municipal organization ==
The municipality is governed by both political and administrative office bearers.

=== Political office bearers ===
The Municipal Aldermen are members of the city council and as such form a collegiate body of municipal authority that represents the municipality's community. Their specific roles include discussing, approving, and overseeing the activity of the various municipal agencies such as public security, finance, public works, and others. They also need to attend civic events. They are led by the Mayor, who is also in service to the citizens in a number of ways.

The Municipal President is directly responsible for certifying the right carrying out of the provisions of the City Council by the municipal public administration and its staff. To do this, he or she therefore needs to monitor both the needs of the population, as well as the arrangements for carrying out municipal public works. The Municipal Trustee is the legal representative within the municipal territory and is responsible for surveilling the municipal public administration.

=== Administrative office bearers ===
The Municipal Secretary summons city council sessions, prepares the minutes of the sessions, collects signatures from the members of the city council, and attends the hearings of the municipal president. They also compile and distribute the laws, decrees, regulations, official publications of the state government, circulars, and orders to the different agencies of the municipal public administration

The Authority Auxiliaries are the municipal agents and policy or sector bosses that have jurisdictions via city council representatives. They can take charge to maintain order and security as required by the system and traditions.

== Social structures ==
=== Housing ===
As of the 2010 census there were a total of 2127 homes in the municipality. The houses are usually made of wooden walls and cardboard with galvanized sheet or tile roofs, although some rooms are made out of cement. Sewerage and drainage services are available to around 70% of the houses, while the rest have outhouses constructed of wood and metal. Plumbed water is connected to 90% of the homes, in some cases via hoses with a key. In very minimal communities, water comes from springs or ponds. If there is piped water it just comes to the center of the town, and needs to be carried from there to homes via buckets or horses.

=== Food supplies ===
The Santiago Yosondúa community receives deliveries of food supplies and other necessities on Sundays. The market there is the most substantial in the micro-region, with merchants from various municipalities such as Santo Domingo Ixcatlán, Santamaría Yolotepéc, and Chalcatongo de Hidalgo.

=== Health ===
The main health center has a doctor and four nurses where minor illnesses are treated. In most cases of serious illness the patient is transferred to a hospital located in the district of Tlaxiaco and Oaxaca City, which costs more. Four other health centers in the municipality have one doctor and two nurses, but 375 of the population does not receive medical attention at all.

=== Work practices ===
Collective work called tequio is organized at the community level either through prior appointment or by the rural police officer. Similarly, guezas or "turned hand" is a system of mutual aid between neighbours and relatives whereby tasks like preparing the land, or planting and harvesting the cornfields and beans, are not paid for with money but with the same amount of labour given in return.

Usually, a woman's role in the community consists of managing the home through food preparation, cleaning, grinding to make tortillas, and taking care of children, although they also participate in cultivation activities outside the house such as weeding, picking, cutting wheat, or planting.

=== Education and cultural revitalization ===
Low rates of formal education is an ongoing concern in the region, with less than half of the population over the age of 15 having completed an elementary level of education, and fewer than 15% having completed a high school degree. Economic pressures that force children to enter the workforce contribute to the relatively low rate of education. This begins at an early age as both boys and girls of ten years or younger work in outdoor activities such as caring for sheep and goats, with girls also required to work indoors at grinding grain, making food, and cleaning the household. Becoming fifteen comes with new responsibilities such as taking care of bulls, even while studying, and if they are not studying any more – as is common after primary school – they take on full employment such as cleaning in neighbouring towns, supporting their parent's lands, or being assistants to a plumber, bricklayer, or carpenter. If a woman marries when young and has children there is no chance for her to study any more.
