= Guevea de Humboldt =

- Municipality and town
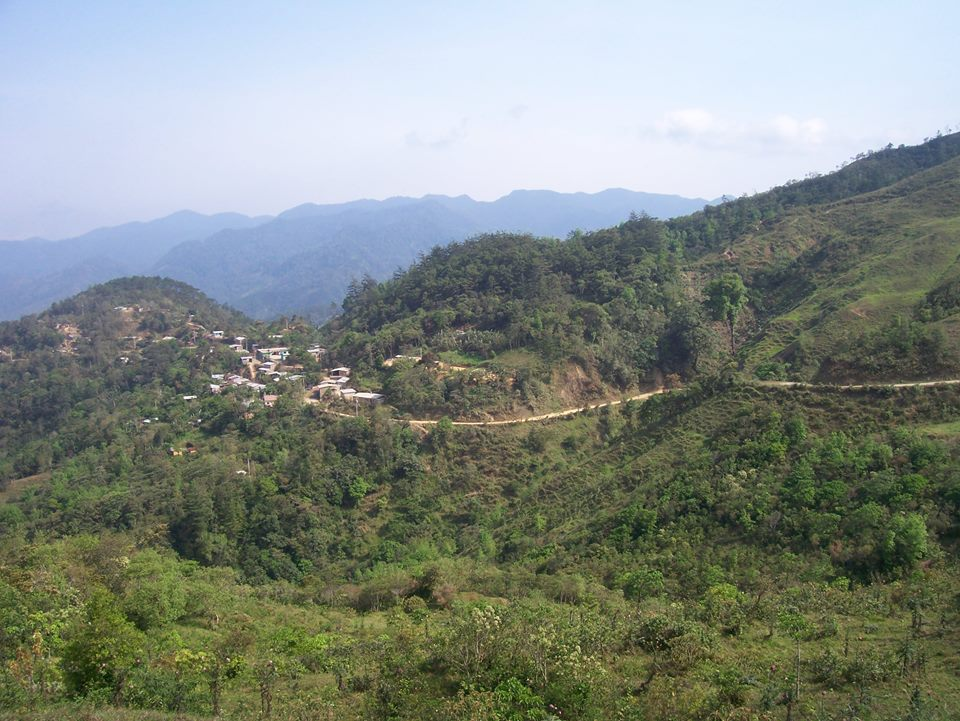

- Location in Mexico
- Coordinates: 16°47′N 95°22′W
- Country: Mexico
- State: Oaxaca

Area
  - Total: 515.43 km^{2} (199.01 sq mi)

Population (2005)
  - Total: 5,283
- Time zone: UTC-6 (Central Standard Time)

Guevea de Humboldt is a town and municipality in Oaxaca in south-western Mexico. It in the north of the Tehuantepec District, which is in the west of the Istmo Region.

== History ==
The name Guevea comes from the variant of the Zapotec language of the local people, and means "flower of muddy water or lily of the river". A painting on cotton cloth from 1540 depicts the town and its neighbor Santo Domingo Petapa. The picture records the history of the people from the time of their migration from Zaachila up to the Spanish conquest, and was designed to establish ancient property rights. The painting records that the town's first Spanish ruler was one Pedro Santiago. The town was called Guevea Santiago until 1936, when the state government changed the name to Guevea Humboldt, naming it after the botanist and explorer Alexander von Humboldt who spent some time in the town.

== Geography ==
The municipality covers an area of 515.43 km^{2}. The town lies at an elevation of 620 meters above sea level. The region is mountainous, on the height of land between the north and south watersheds of the Sierra Mixe.

=== Climate ===
The climate is warm, with most rainfall in the summer. Vegetation includes pine, oak, mahogany, ceiba, cedar and tropical fruit species. Wild fauna include as jaguar, tapir, deer Mazatec, tepeizcuinte, toucan, mockingbird and rattlesnake.

== Economy ==
As of 2005, the municipality had 1,265 households with a total population of 5,283 of whom of 2,475 spoke an indigenous language. It is accessible via a dirt road that connects it with Santa María Guienagati. Economic activities include cultivation of coffee, sugar cane, rice and coconuts, as well as corn, beans and fruits on a smaller scale. Some people raise cattle, pigs, goats and poultry and practice hunting and fishing for local consumption. Some logging extracts fine woods from the forests for furniture manufacturing.

In 1982 the farmers of Guevea de Humboldt and Santa María Guienagati, with advice from Jesuit mission team from the Diocese of Tehuantepec, formed the Union of Indigenous Communities of the Isthmus Region to help gain better prices for their coffee crop. They were later joined by farmers from other communities in the Sierra Mixe and northern Isthmus region. The cooperative, which gained legal status in 1983, assists in technical and financial assistance for local manufactures, as well as storage, transportation and national and international marketing of the products, of which the most important is coffee. As it matured, it paid increased attention to the requirements of women and youth, and to health, education and nutrition. The cooperative gained certification for its members' organic farming, and has established links to fair trade organizations to improve the prices received.
