= Tlacoapa =

City in the Mexican state of Guerrero

- Municipal seat and city
- Location within Guerrero Location within Mexico
- Coordinates: 17°9′N 98°52′W
- Country: Mexico
- State: Guerrero
- Municipality: Tlacoapa
- Time zone: UTC-6 (Zona Centro)

Tlacoapa is a city and seat of the municipality of Tlacoapa, in the Mexican state of Guerrero.
