= Santiago Minas =

Coordinates: 16°26′N 97°10′W

- Municipality and town
- Interactive map of Santiago Minas
- Country: Mexico
- State: Oaxaca
- Time zone: UTC-6 (Central Standard Time)

Santiago Minas is a town and municipality in Oaxaca in south-western Mexico.

As of 2013, the municipality had a total population of 380.
