= Acatepec =

City in the Mexican state of Guerrero

- Municipal seat and city
- Location in Mexico Acatepec (Mexico)
- Coordinates: 16°45′N 98°29′W
- Country: Mexico
- State: Guerrero
- Municipality: Acatepec

Population (2010)
  - Total: 2,238
- INEGI code: 120760001

Acatepec is a city and the seat of Acatepec's municipality, in Guerrero, southern Mexico. As of 2010, the population was 2,238. Acatepec is the most populous location in its municipality and accounts for less than ten percent of its population.
