= Santa María Nativitas =

- Municipality and town
- Location in Mexico
- Coordinates: 17.6667°N 97.3333°W
- Country: Mexico
- State: Oaxaca
- Time zone: UTC-6 (Central Standard Time)

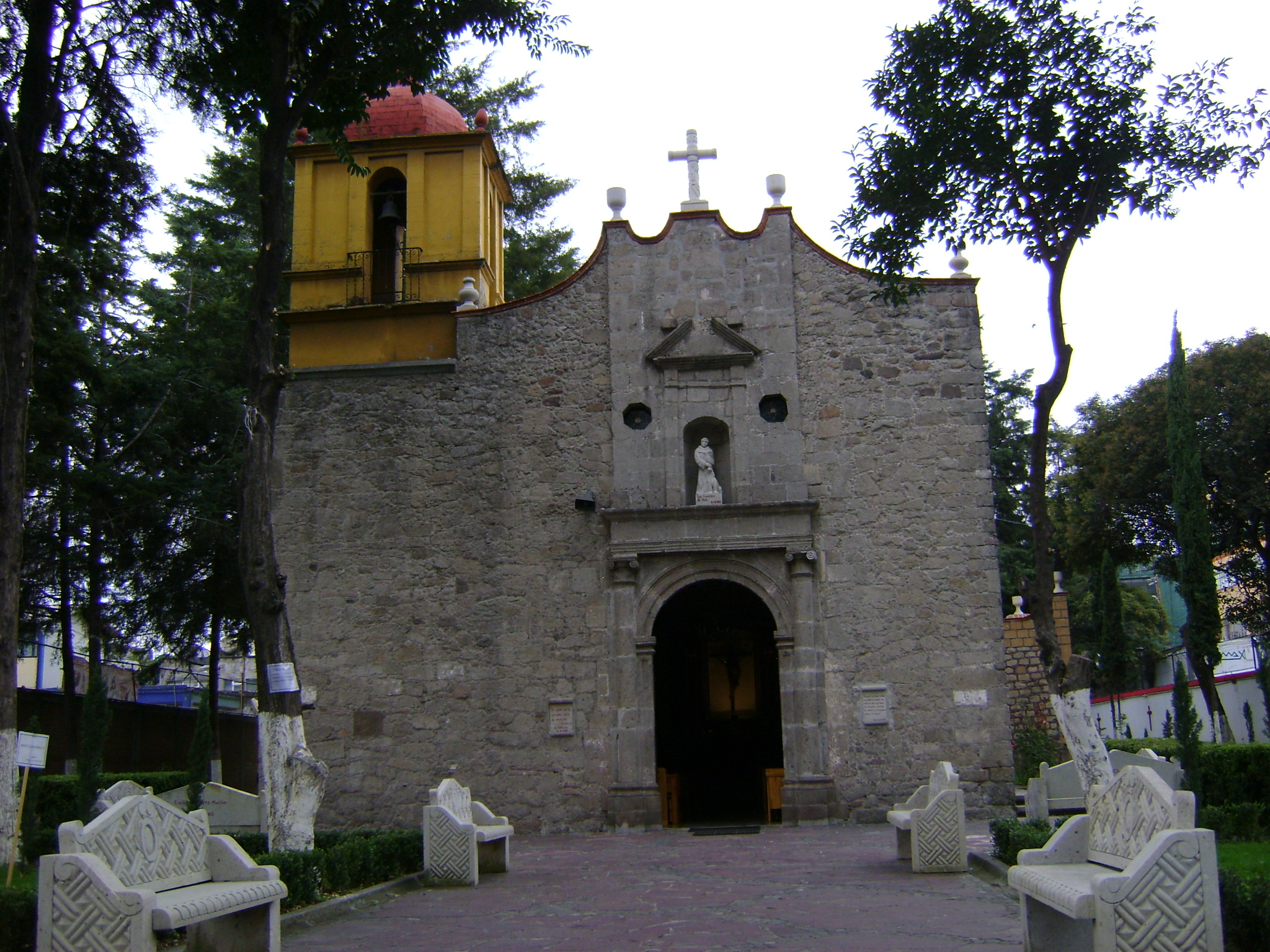
Temple in Santa María Nativitas

Santa María Nativitas is a town and municipality in Oaxaca in south-western Mexico. The municipality covers an area of km^{2}. It is part of the Coixtlahuaca district in the Mixteca Region.

As of 2005, the municipality had a total population of .
