= San Juan Lalana =

- Municipality and town
- Location in Mexico
- Coordinates: 17°28′N 95°53′W
- Country: Mexico
- State: Oaxaca

Area
  - Total: 454.19 km^{2} (175.36 sq mi)

Population (2005)
  - Total: 11,385
- Time zone: UTC-6 (Central Standard Time)

San Juan Lalana is a town and municipality in Oaxaca in south-western Mexico. The municipality covers an area of 454.19 km^{2}. It is part of the Choapam District in the south of the Papaloapan Region.

As of 2005, the municipality had a total population of 11,385.
