= San Agustín Chayuco =

- Municipality and town
- Location in Mexico
- Coordinates: 16°24′N 97°48′W
- Country: Mexico
- State: Oaxaca

Area
  - Total: 107.2 km^{2} (41.4 sq mi)

Population (2005)
  - Total: 4,514
- Time zone: UTC-6 (Central Standard Time)

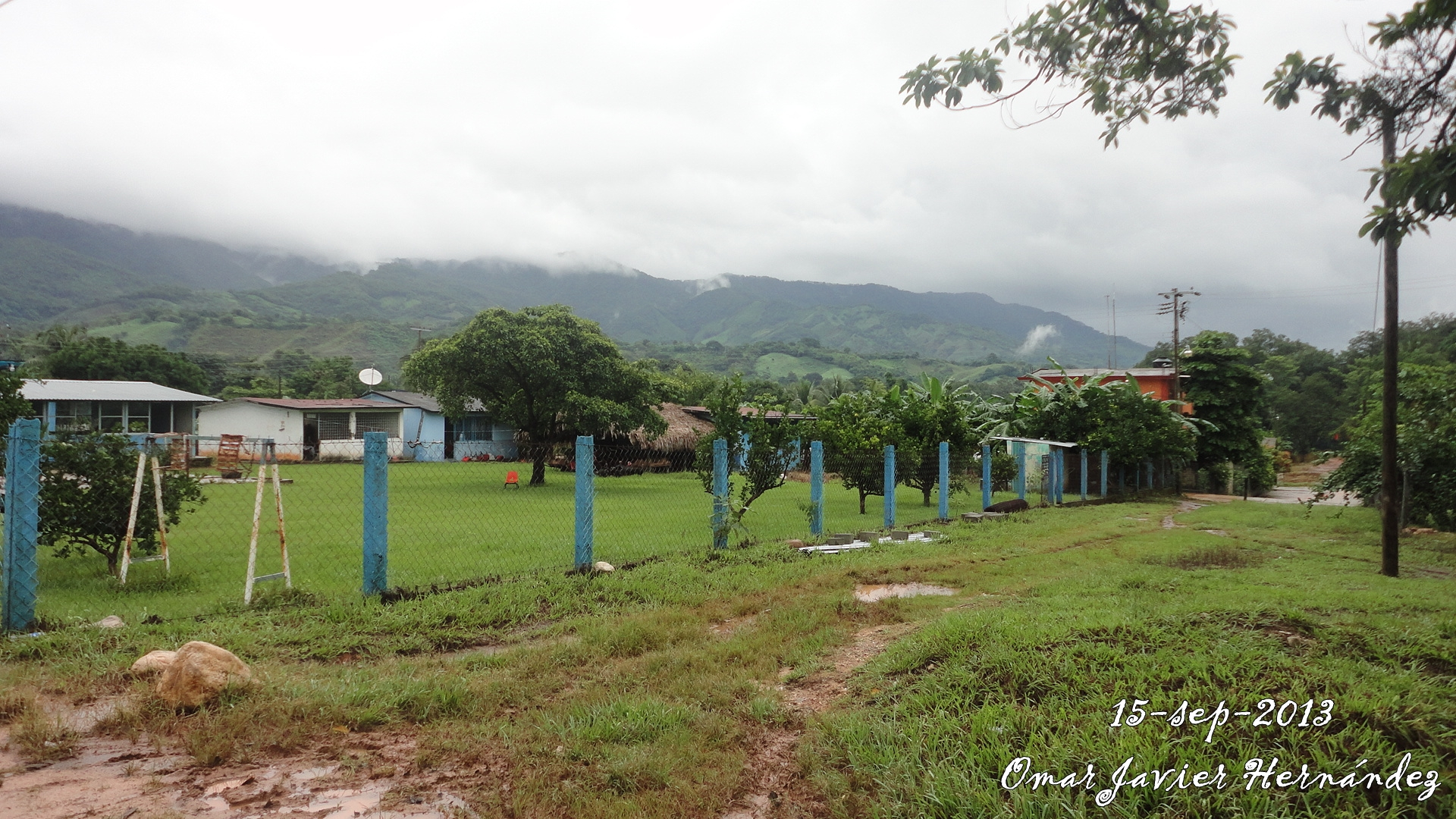

San Agustín Chayuco is a town and municipality in Oaxaca in south-western Mexico. The municipality covers an area of 107.2 km^{2}. It is located in the Jamiltepec District in the west of the Costa Region.

As of 2005, the municipality had a total population of 4,514.
