= Coatzospan Mixtec =

Mixtec language of Oaxaca, Mexico

- (San Juan Coatzóspam)
- Ntudu tuhun davi / Tu’un davi
- Native to: Mexico
- Region: Oaxaca
- Native speakers: (2,100 cited 2000)
- Language family: Oto-Manguean: Mixtecan; Mixtec; Coatzospan–Cuyamecalco; Coatzospan Mixtec

Language codes
- ISO 639-3: miz
- Glottolog: coat1241
- ELP: Northern Alta Mixtec (shared)

Coatzospan Mixtec (Coatzóspam Mixtec) is a Mixtec language of Oaxaca spoken in the town of San Juan Coatzospan.

== Phonology ==
Consonants in parentheses are marginal.

Consonants
		Labial	Dental	Alveolar		Palatal	Velar	
		Labial	Dental	Alveolar		Palatal	plain	labial
Nasal		m		n		ɲ		
Plosive/ Affricate	voiceless	(p)		t	ts	tʲ ~ tʃ	k	kʷ
Plosive/ Affricate	prenasal	(ᵐb)		ⁿd	(ⁿdz)	(ⁿdʲ ~ ⁿdʒ)	(ᵑɡ)	(ᵑɡʷ)
Fricative		β	ð (ðʲ)	(s)		ʃ		
Liquid				l (r)				

In women's speech, /t/ is realized as [tʃ] before front vowels.

Vowel qualities are /a ɨ e i o u/. Vowels may be oral or nasal, creaky or modal, long or short: e.g. /kɨ̰̃ː/ "to go". /o/ is apparently never contrastively nasalized, though it may be phonetically nasalized due to assimilation with a nasal vowel in a following syllable, and morphologically nasalized for the second-person familiar (e.g. /kḭʃi/ 'to come', /kḭʃĩ/ 'you will come'). The preceding vowel nasalizes only if the intervening consonant is voiced, or in some words /ʃ/. Nonetheless, even voiceless fricatives and affricates are phonetically nasalized in such environments: [β̃, ð̃, ts̃, ʃ̃]; the nasalization is visible in the flaring of the nostrils.

The first vowel of a disyllable is creaky if the second consonant is voiceless (except for /ʃ/); only when C2 is voiced or /ʃ/ can there be a contrast between creaky and modal vowels in V1. The irregular behavior /ʃ/ is apparently due to it deriving from proto-Mixtec from both voiceless velar */x/ and voiced */j/ ("*y"). It is words in which /ʃ/ derives from *j that allow V1 to be nasalized or contrastively modally voiced.

Tones are ...
