= San Juan Coatzóspam =

San Juan Coatzóspam Ma Ñuu (Coatzospan Mixtec)
- Municipality and town
- Location in Mexico
- Coordinates: 18°03′N 96°45′W
- Country: Mexico
- State: Oaxaca

Area
  - Total: 63.79 km^{2} (24.63 sq mi)

Population (2005)
  - Total: 2,019
- Time zone: UTC-6 (Central Standard Time)

San Juan Coatzóspam (Coatzospan Mixtec: Ma Ñuu) is a town and municipality in Oaxaca in south-western Mexico. The municipality covers an area of 63.79 km^{2}. It is part of the Teotitlán District in the north of the Cañada Region.

As of 2005, the municipality had a total population of 2,019.
