= Asunción Tlacolulita =

- Municipality and town
- Location in Mexico
- Coordinates: 16°18′N 95°43′W
- Country: Mexico
- State: Oaxaca

Area
  - Total: 244.96 km^{2} (94.58 sq mi)

Population (2005)
  - Total: 699
- Time zone: UTC-6 (Central Standard Time)

Asunción Tlacolulita is a town and municipality in Oaxaca in south-western Mexico. It is part of the Yautepec District in the east of the Sierra Sur Region.

== Geography ==
The municipality covers an area of 244.96 km^{2} at a height of 450 meters above sea level in the Sierra Madre del Sur mountains. The climate is tropical with little rain in the summer. Tree include mahogany, cedar, oak, breadsticks, gunacaxtle, Guayacan and pine. Mango, tamarind, plum, sapodilla, lemon, avocado and papaya fruits are grown. Wild fauna include wild boar, ocelots, snakes, lion, coyotes and foxes.

== Population ==
As of 2005, the municipality had 186 households with a total population of 699 of whom 54 spoke an indigenous language.

== Economy ==
Economic activities include agriculture, growing maize, sorghum, peanuts, beans, coffee and various fruits. The village has two cooperative associations that raise cattle, an important source of income, and some also raise goats, sheep, and pigs. Hunting and fishing are practiced on a small scale for personal consumption. Bricks and roofing tiles are manufactured locally for building houses,
