= Tezoatlán de Segura y Luna =

- Municipality and Town
- Location of the municipality within Oaxaca

- Location in the state of Oaxaca, Mexico
- Coordinates: 17°39′10″N 97°48′34″W
- Country: Mexico
- State: Oaxaca

Area
  - Total: 488.221 km^{2} (188.503 sq mi)
- Elevation: 1,540 m (5,050 ft)

Population (2010 INEGI)
  - Total: 11,319
  - Density: 23.184/km^{2} (60.047/sq mi)
- Time zone: UTC-6 (Central Standard Time)

Tezoatlán de Segura y Luna is a town and municipality in Oaxaca in south-western Mexico. It is part of the Huajuapan District in the north of the Mixteca Region.

== Demographics ==
Tezoatlán de Segura y Luna has a population of 11,319 inhabitants according to data from the INEGI Population and Housing Census of 2010. Of these, 5,158 are men and 6,161 are women.

== Towns ==
The municipality of Tezoatlán de Segura y Luna is made up of several small towns and villages including:

- Bario de Perú
- Bario Independencia
- Caguani
- Cuesta Blanca
- El Aguacate
- El Paredón Amarillo
- Guadalupe de Cisneros
- Juquila de León
- La Lomita
- Las Peñas
- Linda Vista del Progreso
- Miraplayas
- Rancho Juárez
- Rancho Reforma
- Rancho Señor
- Rosario Nuevo
- San Andrés Yutatío
- San Isidro el Naranjo
- San Isidro Zaragoza
- San Juan Cuititó
- San Juan Diquiyú
- San Marcos de Garzón
- San Martín del Río
- San Valentín de Gomez
- San Vicente del Palmar
- Santa Catarina Yutandú
- Santa Cruz Numá
- Santa María Tindú
- Tezoatlán de Segura y Luna
- Yucuñuti de Benito Juárez
- Yucuquimi de Ocampo
