= San Juan Petlapa =

- Municipality and town
- Location in Mexico
- Coordinates: 17°28′N 96°02′W
- Country: Mexico
- State: Oaxaca

Area
  - Total: 253.89 km^{2} (98.03 sq mi)

Population (2005)
  - Total: 2,717
- Time zone: UTC-6 (Central Standard Time)

San Juan Petlapa is a town and municipality in Oaxaca in south-western Mexico. The municipality covers an area of 253.89 km^{2}. It is part of the Choapam District in the south of the Papaloapan Region.

As of 2005, the municipality had a total population of 2,717. Among the population, 773 are Indigenous people.
