= San Bartolo Soyaltepec =

- Municipality and town
- Location in Mexico
- Coordinates: 17°35′N 97°18′W
- Country: Mexico
- State: Oaxaca

Area
  - Total: 70.17 km^{2} (27.09 sq mi)

Population (2005)
  - Total: 681
- Time zone: UTC-6 (Central Standard Time)

San Bartolo Soyaltepec is a town and municipality in Oaxaca in south-western Mexico. The municipality covers an area of 70.17 km^{2}. It is part of the Teposcolula District in the center of the Mixteca Region.

As of 2005, the municipality had a total population of 681.
