= San Pedro Sochiapam =

- Municipality and town
- Location in Mexico
- Coordinates: 17°49′N 96°40′W
- Country: Mexico
- State: Oaxaca

Population (2005)
  - Total: 4,603
- Time zone: UTC-6 (Central Standard Time)

San Pedro Sochiapam is a town and municipality in Oaxaca in south-western Mexico. It is part of Cuicatlán District in the north of the Cañada Region.

As of 2005, the municipality had a total population of 4,603.
