= Yutanduchi de Guerrero =

- Municipality and town
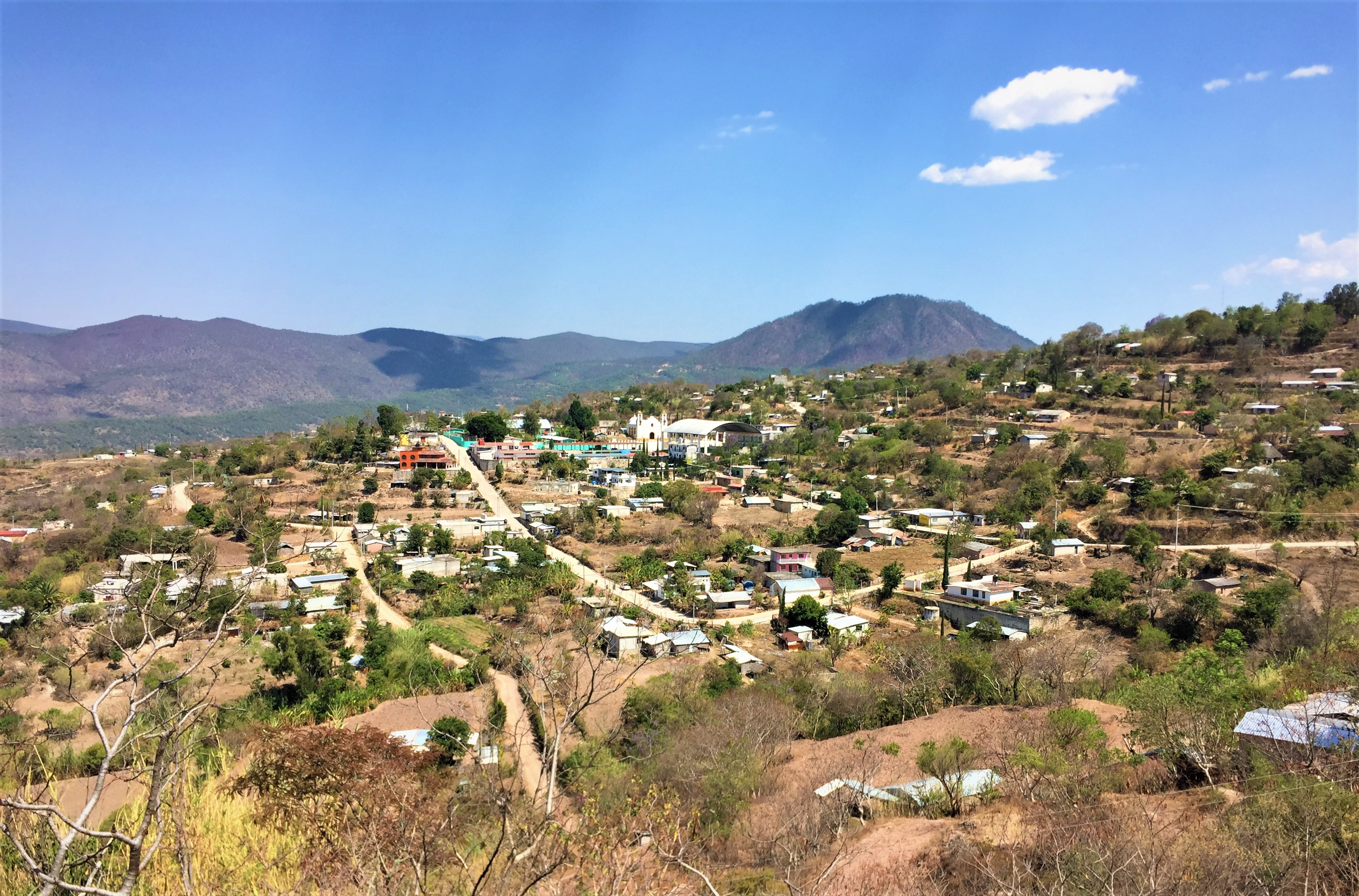

- Location in Mexico
- Coordinates: 17°2′N 97°18′W
- Country: Mexico
- State: Oaxaca
- Time zone: UTC-6 (Central Standard Time)

Yutanduchi de Guerrero is one of the 570 municipalities of Oaxaca. The capital of the municipality is Yutanduchi de Guerrero. The city's INEGI identification number is 20564.

== Geography ==
Yutanduchi de Guerrero is part of the Nochixtlán, which is further subdivided into 32 municipalities. The district is in the southeastern part of the Mixteca Region, in the northwestern part of the state of Oaxaca. As of 2005 INEGI census, the municipality had 1175 inhabitants: 552 men and 623 women. The municipality has an area of 223.27 square kilometers. The average elevation is 1620 meters above sea level.

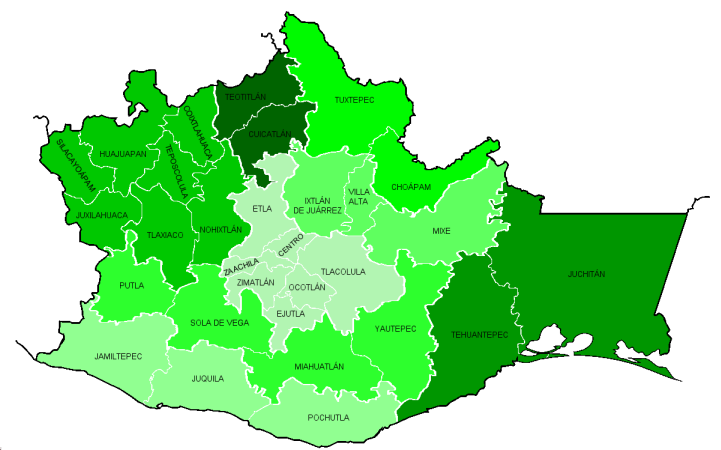
Location of Yutanduchi de Guerrero within the state of Oaxaca.

== Demographics ==
In 2000 there were 966 indigenous people. Of these 818 were older than 5. There are a total of 818 bilinguals (speakers of Spanish and an indigenous language).
