= San Juan Diuxi =

- Municipality and town
- Location in Mexico
- Coordinates: 17°16′50″N 97°22′25″W
- Country: Mexico
- State: Oaxaca

Area
  - Total: 96.96 km^{2} (37.44 sq mi)

Population (2005)
  - Total: 1,280
- Time zone: UTC-6 (Central Standard Time)

San Juan Diuxi is a town and municipality in Oaxaca in south-western Mexico. The municipality covers an area of 96.96 square kilometres (37.44 sq mi). It is part of the Nochixtlán District in the southeast of the Mixteca Region.

As of 2005, the municipality had a total population of 1,280.
