= Santo Tomás Mazaltepec =

Coordinates: 17°10′N 96°52′W

- Municipality and town
- Interactive map of Santo Tomás Mazaltepec
- Country: Mexico
- State: Oaxaca
- Time zone: UTC-6 (Central Standard Time)

Santo Tomás Mazaltepec is a town and municipality in Oaxaca in south-western Mexico. The municipality covers an area of km^{2}. It is part of the Etla District in the Valles Centrales region.

== Demography ==
As of 2005, the municipality had a total population of 1,878, of whom 926 spoke an indigenous language (Zapotec).
