= San Bartolomé Yucuañe =

- Municipality and town
- Location in Mexico
- Coordinates: 17°14′N 97°27′W
- Country: Mexico
- State: Oaxaca

Area
  - Total: 65.07 km^{2} (25.12 sq mi)

Population (2005)
  - Total: 380
- Time zone: UTC-6 (Central Standard Time)

San Bartolomé Yucuañe is a town and municipality in Oaxaca in south-western Mexico. The municipality covers an area of 65.07 km^{2}. It is part of the Tlaxiaco District in the south of the Mixteca Region. As of 2005, the municipality had a total population of 380.
