= San Francisco Ozolotepec =

- Municipality and town
- Location in Mexico
- Coordinates: 16°04′N 96°13′W
- Country: Mexico
- State: Oaxaca

Population (2020)
  - Total: 2,182
- Time zone: UTC-6 (Central Standard Time)

San Francisco Ozolotepec is a town and municipality in Oaxaca in south-western Mexico. The municipality covers an area of km^{2}. It is part of the Miahuatlán District in the south of the Sierra Sur Region.

As of 2020, the municipality had a total population of 2,182.
