= Santo Domingo Petapa =

- Municipality and town
- Location in Mexico
- Coordinates: 16°49′N 95°8′W
- Country: Mexico
- State: Oaxaca

Area
  - Total: 232.2 km^{2} (89.7 sq mi)

Population (2005)
  - Total: 7,583
- Time zone: UTC-6 (Central Standard Time)

Santo Domingo Petapa is a town and municipality in Oaxaca in south-western Mexico.

== Geography ==
The municipality covers an area of 232.2 km^{2}, at an average altitude of 250 meters above sea level, and is part of the Juchitán District of the Istmo de Tehuantepec region. The climate is hot and humid with summer rains.

=== Flora and fauna ===
Flora include mahogany, cedar, oak, pine, pine, and Nopo guanacaste, deer, pochote, chiviveta, beo, mamey, taro and cassava. Wild fauna include boar, badger, raccoon, armadillo, squirrel, wild cat and rabbit.

== Demography ==
As of 2005, the municipality had a total population of 7,583 of whom 2,696 spoke indigenous languages.

A painting on cotton cloth from 1540 depicts the town and its neighbor Guevea de Humboldt. The picture records the history of the people from the time of their migration from Zaachila up to the Spanish conquest, and was designed to establish ancient property rights.

== Economy ==
The main economic activity is coffee cultivation. The people also grow corn, beans, pineapple, citrus, melon and watermelon, raise cattle, horses, pigs and poultry, and engage in logging. The Union of Indigenous Communities of the Isthmus Region, a cooperative founded in 1982, assists in production and distribution of the local products, notably coffee, under a fair trade label.
