= Santa María Apazco =

- Municipality and town
- Location in Mexico
- Coordinates: 17°38′N 97°8′W
- Country: Mexico
- State: Oaxaca
- Time zone: UTC-6 (Central Standard Time)

Santa María Apazco is a town and municipality in Oaxaca in south-western Mexico. It is part of the Nochixtlán District in the southeast of the Mixteca Region.

== Demography ==
In 2015, the population in Santa María Apazco was 1,629 inhabitants (45.4% men and 54.6% women). Compared to 2010, the population in Santa María Apazco decreased by -14.2%. 45.7% of the population was in a situation of moderate poverty and 41.2% in extreme poverty. The vulnerable population due to social deprivation reached 13%, while the vulnerable population by income was 0%.

In 2020, 90.7% of the population in Santa María Apazco had no access to sewage systems, 15.1% did not have a water supply network, 5.37% did not have a bathroom and 5.96% did not have electricity.
