= San Pedro Ixcatlán =

- Municipality and town
- Location in Mexico
- Coordinates: 18°09′N 96°30′W
- Country: Mexico
- State: Oaxaca
- Time zone: UTC-6 (Central Standard Time)

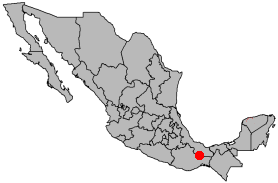

San Pedro Ixcatlán is a town and municipality in Oaxaca in southwestern Mexico. The municipality covers an area of 101.9 km^{2}. It's part of the Tuxtepec District of the Papaloapan Region.
