= San Jacinto Tlacotepec =

- Municipality and town
- Location in Mexico
- Coordinates: 16°31′N 97°23′W
- Country: Mexico
- State: Oaxaca

Area
  - Total: 233.5 km^{2} (90.2 sq mi)

Population (2005)
  - Total: 2,145
- Time zone: UTC-6 (Central Standard Time)

San Jacinto Tlacotepec is a town and municipality in Oaxaca in south-western Mexico. The municipality covers an area of 233.5 km^{2}. It is part of the Sola de Vega District in the Sierra Sur Region.

== Demography ==
As of 2005, the municipality had a total population of 2,145.

The local language, Zenzontepec Chatino, is also spoken in the municipality of Santa Cruz Zenzontepec and in the former municipality of Santa María Tlapanalquiahuitl.
