= San Dionisio Ocotepec =

San Dionisio Ocotepec Xniixh (Güilá Zapotec)
- Municipality and town
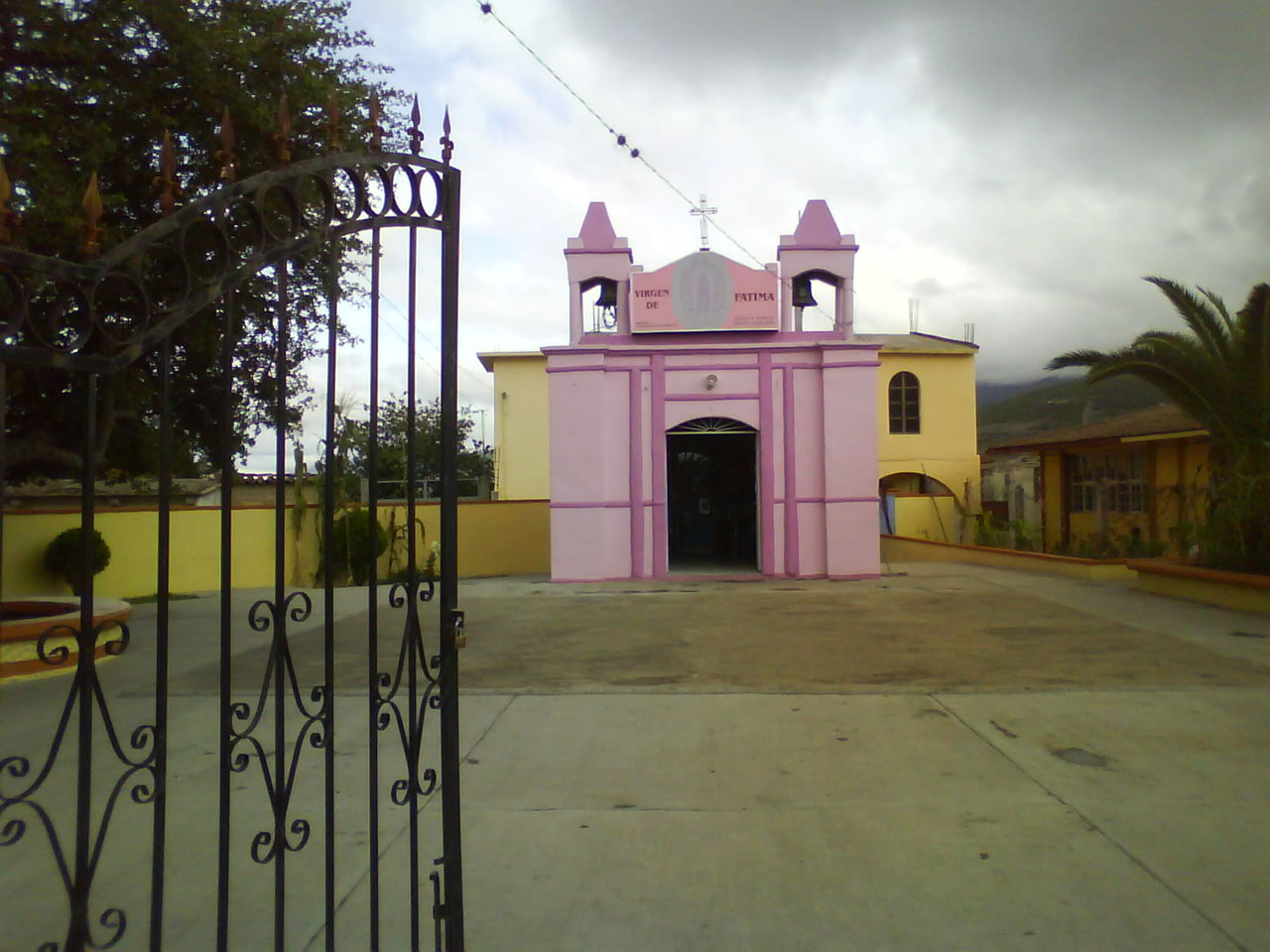

- Location in Mexico
- Coordinates: 16°48′N 96°24′W
- Country: Mexico
- State: Oaxaca

Area
  - Total: 225.82 km^{2} (87.19 sq mi)

Population (2005)
  - Total: 9,487
- Time zone: UTC-6 (Central Standard Time)

San Dionisio Ocotepec (Güilá Zapotec: Xniixh) is a town and municipality in Oaxaca in south-western Mexico. The municipality covers an area of 225.82 km^{2}. It is part of the Tlacolula District in the east of the Valles Centrales Region.

As of 2005, the municipality had a total population of 9,487.
