= Santa Cruz Zenzontepec =

Santa Cruz Zenzontepec Qyaᶜ ytiᴮ
- Municipality and town
- Location in Mexico
- Coordinates: 16°32′N 97°30′W
- Country: Mexico
- State: Oaxaca

Area
  - Total: 361.06 km^{2} (139.41 sq mi)
- Elevation: 950 m (3,120 ft)

Population (2005)
  - Total: 16,773
- Time zone: UTC-6 (Central Standard Time)

Santa Cruz Zenzontepec (Highland Chatino: Qyaᶜ ytiᴮ) is a town and municipality in Oaxaca in south-western Mexico. It is part of the Sola de Vega District in the Sierra Sur Region.

== Name ==
In Highland Chatino, the town is known as Qyaᶜ ytiᴮ.. The name "Zenzontepec" means "Four hills" in Nahuatl.

== Geography ==
The municipality covers an area of 361.06 km^{2} at an elevation of 950 meters above sea level. The terrain is rugged, in the southern edge of the Sierra Madre del Sur. The climate is mild with summer rains. There is a wide variety of trees, flowers and edible plants. Fruit that grow in the area include mango, cherimoya, mamey, lime, lemon, black sapote, nanche, plum, coconut, avocado, lemon, papaya and pineapple. Fauna include mountain lion, tiger, wild boar, deer, badger, opossum, fox, armadillo, squirrel, raccoon, skunk and bats.

== Population ==
As of 2005, the municipality had 3,088 households with a total population of 16,773 of whom 9,643 spoke indigenous languages. The houses typically have cement floors, mud adobe walls and galvanized steel or tile roofs.

== Economy ==
The majority of the population is engaged in agriculture, planting corn, beans and vegetables at the family level. Zenzontepec is one of the centers of the Chatino people, related to the Zapotec but with a distinct language, the Chatino language. Zenzontepec Chatino is also spoken in the municipality of San Jacinto Tlacotepec, and in the former municipality of Santa María Tlapanalquiahuitl.
