= Lake Miguel Alemán =

Reservoir in Mexico

- Location within Oaxaca
- Location: San Miguel Soyaltepec, Oaxaca, Mexico
- Coordinates: 18°14′19.94″N 96°30′44.55″W
- Primary inflows: Tonto River, Santo Domingo River
- Basin countries: Mexico
- Surface area: 47,800 ha (118,000 acres)
- Water volume: 6.77 km^{3} (1.62 cu mi)
- Islands: Isabel Maria islands

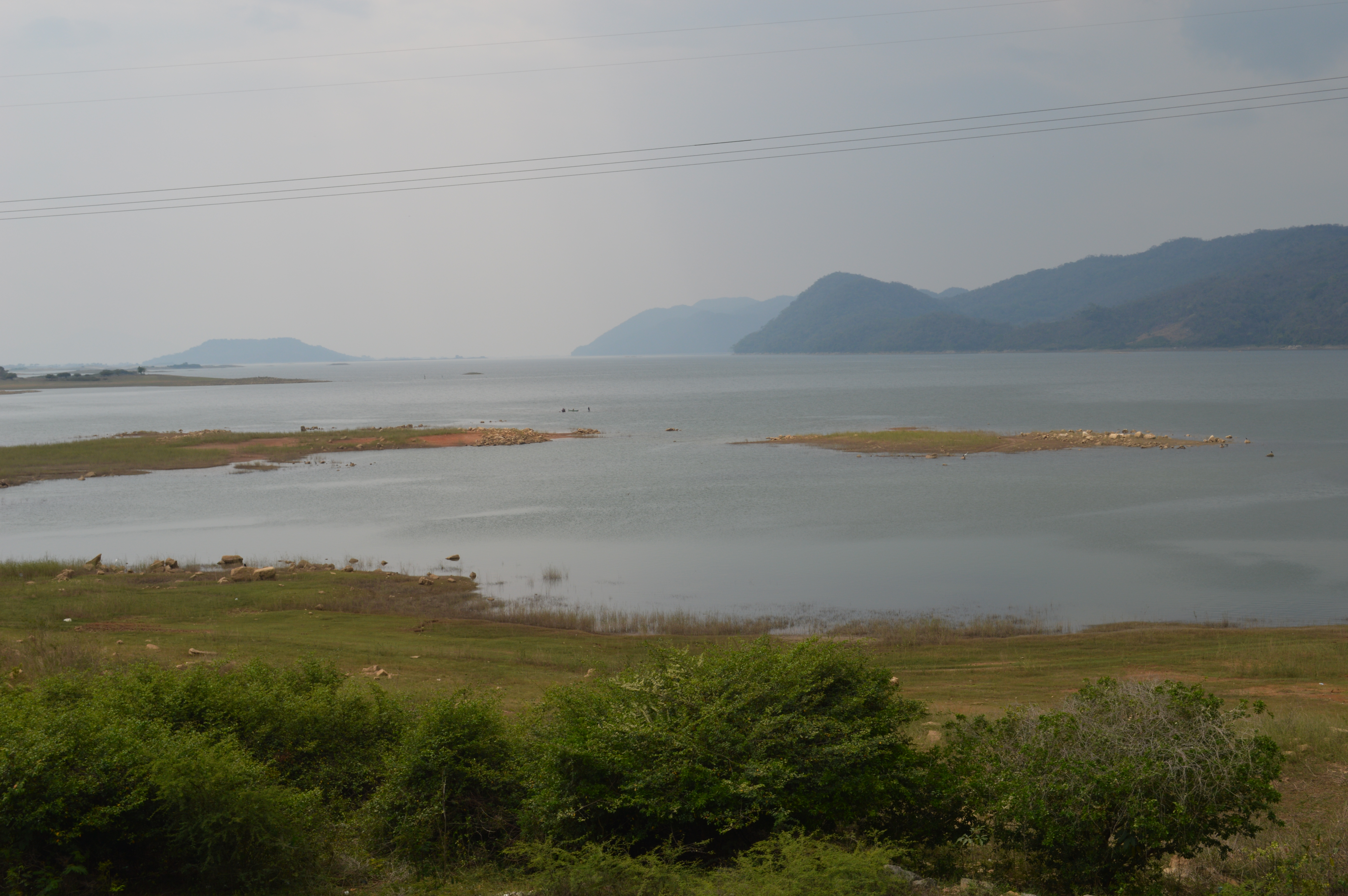
Miguel Aleman Dam in Oaxaca

Lake Miguel Alemán is in the Papaloapan Region of northern Oaxaca state, Mexico. It was formed by the Miguel Alemán Dam on the Tonto River, and is connected by a channel to the reservoir of the Cerro de Oro Dam on the Santo Domingo River. The Tonto and Santo Domingo rivers join downstream of the dams to form the Papaloapan River. The lake is scenic, providing income from fishing and tourism. The northwestern shore and islands have been declared a nature reserve. Commercial fisheries produce approximately 700 tons per year. The hilltops in the area covered by the lake are now the San Miguel Soyaltepec and Isabel Maria Islands. The reservoir contains catfish, tilapia, and carp and other types of fish. Tourist activities include sport fishing, water skiing, rowing and boat tours provided by the local fishermen. Important boat races are sometimes held in May.

In recent years there has been a re-evaluation of the Papaloapan Project's impact on the environment.
