= San Bartolo Yautepec =

- Municipality and town
- Location in Mexico
- Coordinates: 16°26′N 95°58′W
- Country: Mexico
- State: Oaxaca

Area
  - Total: 196.5 km^{2} (75.9 sq mi)

Population (2005)
  - Total: 661
- Time zone: UTC-6 (Central Standard Time)

San Bartolo Yautepec is a town and municipality in Oaxaca in south-western Mexico. It is part of the Yautepec District in the east of the Sierra Sur Region.

== Geography ==
The municipality covers an area of 196.5 km^{2} at an elevation of 860 meters above sea level in the foothills to the east of the Sierra Madre del Sur. The climate is hot, with prevalent winds from the north and most rainfall during summer and autumn.

=== Flora and fauna ===
Trees include oak, prickly pear, mahogany, kapok tree, pine, and guanacaste. Various fruits grow in the area such as avocado, guava, soursop, sapodilla, pitaya, cocoanut, orange, tangerine, pomegranate, lime, lemon, mamey, sapodilla, tamarind, banana and plum. Wildlife includes coyote, deer, armadillo, badger, rabbit, opossum, squirrel, bobcat, ocelot, wild boar and turtle.

== Demography ==
As of 2005, the municipality had 177 households with a total population of 661 of whom 195 spoke an indigenous language.

== Economy ==
The main economic activity is agriculture, growing maize, sorghum, peanuts and other crops such as beans, coffee and various fruits. Some people keep cattle, sheep and pigs, and some produce mezcal.
