= Santiago Xiacuí =

- Municipality and town
- Location in Mexico
- Coordinates: 17°18′N 96°27′W
- Country: Mexico
- State: Oaxaca
- Time zone: UTC-6 (Central Standard Time)

Santiago Xiacuí is a town and municipality in Oaxaca in south-western Mexico. The municipality covers an area of km^{2}. It is part of the Ixtlán District in the Sierra Norte region.

As of 2005, the municipality had a total population of .
