= Albarradas Zapotec =

Zapotec language of Oaxaca, Mexico

- Santo Domingo Albarradas Zapotec
- Native to: Mexico
- Region: Oaxaca
- Native speakers: (5,500 cited 1980 census)
- Language family: Oto-Manguean: Zapotecan; Zapotec; Central; Albarradas Zapotec

Language codes
- ISO 639-3: zas
- Glottolog: sant1450
- ELP: Albarradas Zapotec

Albarradas Zapotec, in full Santo Domingo Albarradas Zapotec, is a Zapotec language of Oaxaca, Mexico. It is spoken in the towns of Santa María Albarradas, Santo Domingo Albarradas, and San Miguel Albarradas. The language of neighboring Santa Catarina Albarradas and San Antonio Albarradas is not mutually intelligible.
