= San Bartolomé Ayautla =

- Municipality and town
- Location in Mexico
- Coordinates: 18°02′N 96°40′W
- Country: Mexico
- State: Oaxaca

Area
  - Total: 118.65 km^{2} (45.81 sq mi)

Population (2005)
  - Total: 3,713
- Time zone: UTC-6 (Central Standard Time)

San Bartolomé Ayautla Tierra del Achiote y el Mamey is a town and municipality in Oaxaca in south-western Mexico. The municipality covers an area of 118.65 km^{2}. It is part of the Teotitlán District in the north of the Cañada Region.

As of 2005, the municipality had a total population of 3,713.
