= Santiago Amoltepec =

Coordinates: 16°37′N 97°30′W

- Municipality and town
- Interactive map of Santiago Amoltepec
- Country: Mexico
- State: Oaxaca

Area
  - Total: 142.99 km^{2} (55.21 sq mi)

Population (2005)
  - Total: 11,113
- Time zone: UTC-6 (Central Standard Time)

Santiago Amoltepec is a town and municipality in the state of Oaxaca in south-western Mexico. The municipality covers an area of 142.99 km^{2}. It is part of the Sola de Vega District in the Sierra Sur Region.

As of 2005, the municipality has a total population of 11,113.
