= Santiago Zoochila =

Coordinates: 17°13′N 96°14′W

- Municipality and town
- Interactive map of Santiago Zoochila
- Country: Mexico
- State: Oaxaca
- Time zone: UTC-6 (Central Standard Time)

Santiago Zoochila is a town and municipality in Oaxaca in south-western Mexico. The municipality covers an area of 8.213km^{2}. It is part of the Villa Alta District in the center of the Sierra Norte Region.

As of 2005, the municipality had a total population of .
