= Santiago Tilantongo =

Coordinates: 17°17′N 97°21′W

- Municipality and town
- Interactive map of Santiago Tilantongo
- Country: Mexico
- State: Oaxaca
- Time zone: UTC-6 (Central Standard Time)

Santiago Tilantongo is a town and municipality in Oaxaca in south-western Mexico. It is part of the Nochixtlán District in the southeast of the Mixteca Region.

As of 2005, Santiago Tilantongo had a total population of 3,348 living in 827 residences. Almost half speak an indigenous language, and all but about 200 are Roman Catholic. The municipality has a pre-school, an elementary school and a telesecundaria, as well as a rural medical clinic, a tianguis market, and a Dominican church. The church dates from the early colonial era and has a number of excellent santos, statues of saints, many done in fine polychrome and some dating to the 16th and 17th centuries.

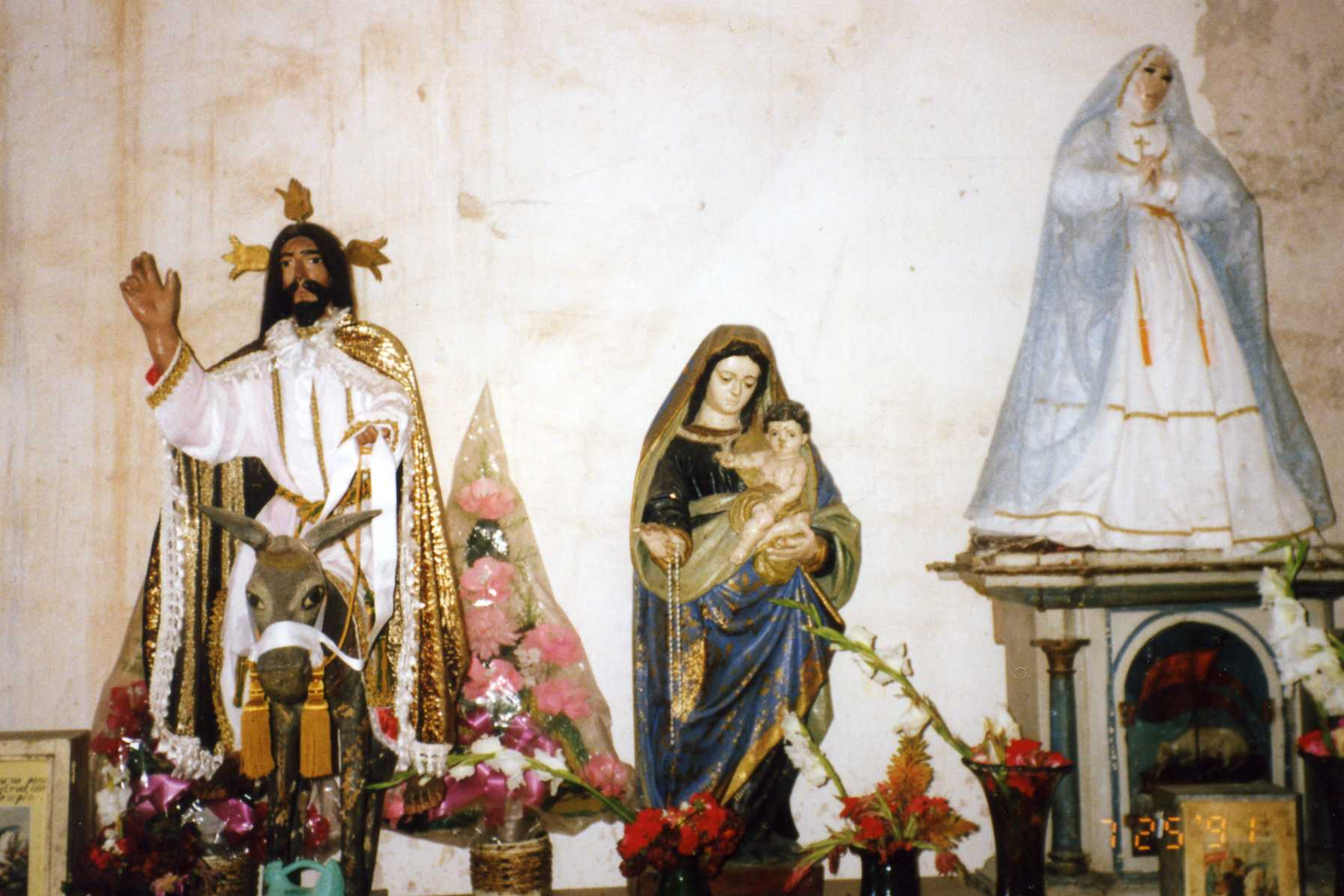
Santos used in Holy Week observances

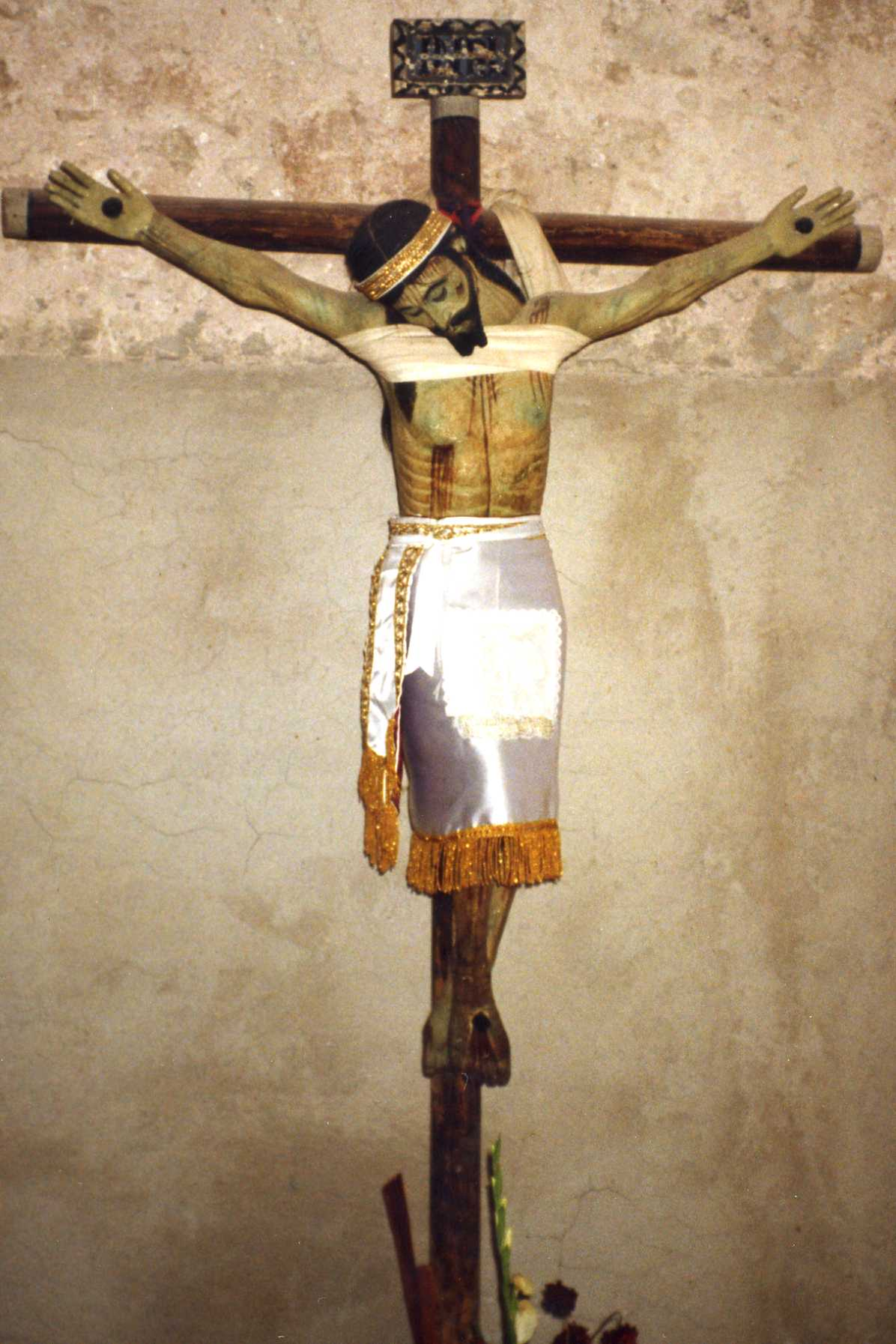
A very old Señor de la Misericordia given a modern loincloth.

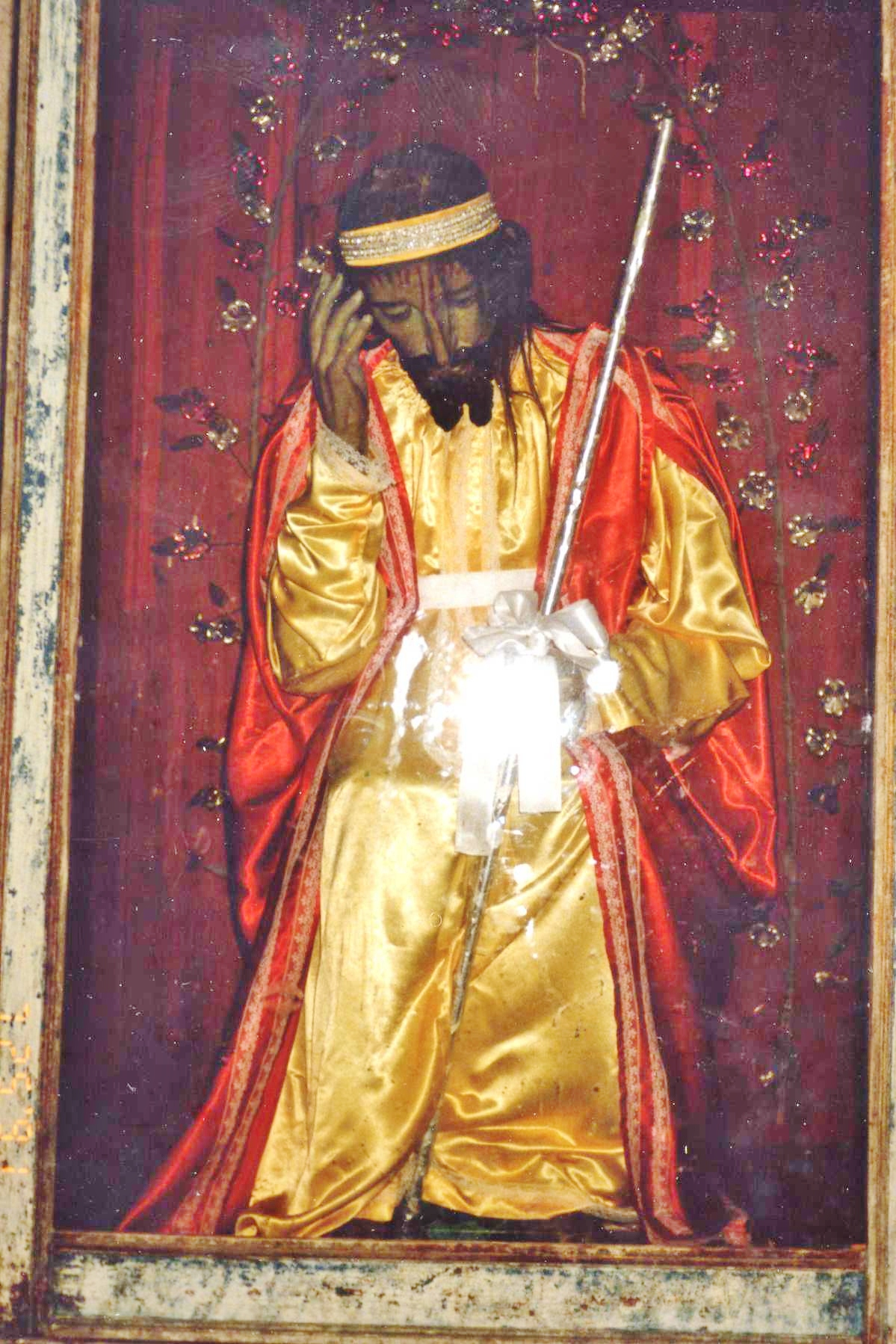
El Dios de la Peña
