= Santiago Textitlán =

Coordinates: 16°42′N 97°15′W

- Municipality and town
- Interactive map of Santiago Textitlán
- Country: Mexico
- State: Oaxaca
- Time zone: UTC-6 (Central Standard Time)

Santiago Textitlán is a town and municipality in Oaxaca in south-western Mexico. The municipality covers an area of km^{2}. It is part of the Sola de Vega District in the Sierra Sur Region.

As of 2005, the municipality had a total population of .

Zaniza Zapotec is spoken in the town.
