= Santiago Chazumba =

- Municipality and town
- Location in Mexico
- Coordinates: 18°12′N 97°40′W
- Country: Mexico
- State: Oaxaca

Population (2020)
  - Total: 4,877
- Time zone: UTC-6 (Central Standard Time)
- Postal code: 69010-69017
- Area code: 953

Santiago Chazumba is a town and municipality in Oaxaca in south-western Mexico. It is part of the Huajuapan District in the north of the Mixteca Region.

As of 2020, the municipality had a total population of 4,877: 2,581 female and 2,296 male.
