= Santiago Jocotepec =

- Municipality and town
- Location in Mexico
- Coordinates: 17°35′N 95°53′W
- Country: Mexico
- State: Oaxaca

Area
  - Total: 732.32 km^{2} (282.75 sq mi)

Population (2005)
  - Total: 12,423
- Time zone: UTC-6 (Central Standard Time)
- Postal code: 68920
- Area code: 287

Santiago Jocotepec is a municipality in Oaxaca in south-western Mexico. It is part of the Choapam District of the Papaloapan Region.

The municipality was established on 15 March 1825. As of 2005, the municipality had a total population of 12,423, of whom 7,173 spoke indigenous languages. The main towns are Monte Negro (population 1,876), Santiago Jocotepec, Rio Chiquito and San Antonio Las Palmas. The municipality covers an area of 732.32 km^{2}, and is on average 100 meters above sea level. The principal river is the Monte Negro.

Municipal president Pedro Escárcega died in 2020 during the COVID-19 pandemic in Mexico.
