= Güilá Zapotec =

Zapotec language of Oaxaca, Mexico

- (San Pablo Güilá)
- Diza
- Native to: Mexico
- Region: Oaxaca
- Native speakers: (9,500 cited 1990 census)
- Language family: Oto-Manguean: Zapotecan; Zapotec; Central; Valley; Güilá Zapotec
- Dialects: San Pablo Güilá; San Dionisio

Language codes
- ISO 639-3: ztu
- Glottolog: guil1236

Güilá Zapotec (Zapoteco de San Pablo Güilá, Zapoteco de San Dionisio Ocotepec) is a Zapotec language of Oaxaca, Mexico. It is spoken in the town of San Pablo Güilá (Gwily), Tlacolula District, Oaxaca, Mexico.

A closely related but not identical form of Zapotec is spoken in the adjacent town of San Dionisio Ocotepec (Xniixh).

== Sources ==
- Arellanes, Francisco. 2009. El sistema fonológico y las propriedades fonéticas del zapoteco de San Pablo Güilá. Descripción y análisis formal. Tesis doctoral. Colegio de México.
- Broadwell, George A. 2001. "Optimal order and pied-piping in San Dionicio Zapotec." In Peter Sells, ed. Formal and Empirical Issues in Optimality Theoretic Syntax, pp. 197–123. Stanford: CSLI Publications.
- Broadwell, George A. 2005. The morphology of Zapotec pronominal clitics.in Rosemary Beam de Azcona and Mary Paster, eds. Survey of California and Other Indian Languages, Report 13: Conference on Otomanguean and Oaxacan Languages, pp. 15–35. University of California at Berkeley.
- Broadwell, George Aaron and Luisa Martinez. 2014.Online dictionary of San Dionisio Ocotepec Zapotec
- López Crus, Ausencia. 1997. Morfología verbal de San Pablo Güilá. Thesis. Escuela Nacional de Antropologia e Historia. Mexico City.
