= Santiago Tlazoyaltepec =

Coordinates: 17°02′N 96°59′W

- Municipality and town
- Interactive map of Santiago Tlazoyaltepec
- Country: Mexico
- State: Oaxaca

Area
  - Total: 93.13 km^{2} (35.96 sq mi)
- Elevation: 2,540 m (8,330 ft)

Population (2005)
  - Total: 4,357
- Time zone: UTC-6 (Central Standard Time)

Santiago Tlazoyaltepec is a town and municipality in Oaxaca in south-western Mexico. The municipality covers an area of 93.13 km^{2}. It is part of the Etla District in the Valles Centrales region. As of 2005, the municipality had a total population of 4,357.
