= Santa Catarina Albarradas Zapotec =

Zapotec language of Oaxaca, Mexico

- Native to: Mexico
- Region: Oaxaca
- Native speakers: (1,000 cited 1990 census)
- Language family: Oto-Manguean: Zapotecan; Zapotec; Central; Valley; ?; Santa Catarina Albarradas Zapotec

Language codes
- ISO 639-3: ztn
- Glottolog: sant1448

Santa Catarina Albarradas Zapotec, also known as San Antonio Albarradas Zapotec, is a Zapotec language of Oaxaca, Mexico. Speakers find neighboring Santo Domingo Albarradas Zapotec marginally intelligible (80%), but the reverse is not the case (50%).

== See also ==
- Albarradas Sign Language
