= San Juan Bautista Tlacoatzintepec =

- Municipality and town
- Nickname: antonio
- Location in Mexico
- Coordinates: 17°51′36″N 96°35′24″W
- Country: Mexico
- State: Oaxaca

Area
  - Total: 183.7 km^{2} (70.9 sq mi)

Population (2005)
  - Total: 2,241
- Time zone: UTC-6 (Central Standard Time)

San Juan Bautista Tlacoatzintepec is a town and municipality in Oaxaca in south-western Mexico. The municipality covers an area of 183.7 km^{2}. It is part of Cuicatlán District in the north of the Cañada Region.

As of 2005, the municipality had a total population of 2,241.
