= San Andrés Yutatío =

- Town
- Location in the state of Oaxaca, Mexico
- Coordinates: 17°36′28″N 97°53′39″W
- Country: Mexico
- State: Oaxaca
- Elevation: 2,000 m (6,600 ft)

Population (2010 INEGI)
  - Total: 695
- Time zone: UTC-6 (Central Standard Time)
  - Summer (DST): UTC-5 (Central Daylight Time)

San Andrés Yutatío is a small town in the municipality of Tezoatlán de Segura y Luna, in the Huajuapan District of the Mixteca Baja region, in the state of Oaxaca, Mexico.

== Demographics ==
San Andrés Yutatío has a population of 695 inhabitants according to data from the INEGI Population and Housing Census of 2010. Of these, 320 are men and 375 are women. In 2020 population rose to 823 inhabitants, with 449 being women and 374 being men.
