= Santiago Apoala =

- Municipality and town
- Location in Mexico
- Coordinates: 17°39′N 97°08′W
- Country: Mexico
- State: Oaxaca

Area
  - Total: 57.41 km^{2} (22.17 sq mi)

Population (2005)
  - Total: 815
- Time zone: UTC-6 (Central Standard Time)

Santiago Apoala is a village and municipality in the state of Oaxaca, Mexico, located north of Oaxaca city. It is part of the Nochixtlán District in the southeast of the Mixteca Region.

The name “apoala” is from Nahuatl meaning “water that destroys”. It is 1,970 meters (6,460 ft) above sea level. It is part of the Mixtec area of Oaxaca state and is also known by its Mixtec name of “Yutatnoho” which means “river where the lords come from”. Its foundation date is unknown but local legends say this was one of the first areas settled by the Mixtecs.

There are two waterfalls nearby called Cascadas de Apoala and Cola de Serpiente (snake’s tail). Each is more than 50 meters (160 ft) high and there are number natural springs in the area.

== The municipality ==
As municipal seat, the village of Santiago Apoala has governing jurisdiction over the following communities:

Arriba de la Peña, Jazmín Morelos, San Antonio Nduayaco, Tierra Colorada, Unión Buena Vista (Yodocanit o Yodocani), and Unión Palo Solo
