= Natividad, Oaxaca =

Natividad
- Municipality and town
- Location in Mexico
- Coordinates: 17°18′N 96°25′W
- Country: Mexico
- State: Oaxaca

Area
  - Total: 28.07 km^{2} (10.84 sq mi)

Population (2005)
  - Total: 546
- Time zone: UTC-6 (Central Standard Time)

Natividad is a town and municipality in Oaxaca in southeastern Mexico and is the smallest municipality in Oaxaca. The municipality covers an area of 28.07 km^{2}. It is part of the Ixtlán District in the Sierra Norte de Oaxaca region.

As of 2005, the municipality had a total population of 546.
