= Santiago Tetepec =

Coordinates: 16°20′N 97°45′W

- Municipality and town
- Interactive map of Santiago Tetepec
- Country: Mexico
- State: Oaxaca
- Time zone: UTC-6 (Central Standard Time)

Santiago Tetepec is a town and municipality in Oaxaca in south-western Mexico. It is located in the Jamiltepec District in the west of the Costa Region.

As of 2020, the municipality had a population of 4,909 people and the town had 1,200 people.
