= Santiago Xanica =

Coordinates: 16°00′N 96°14′W

- Municipality and town
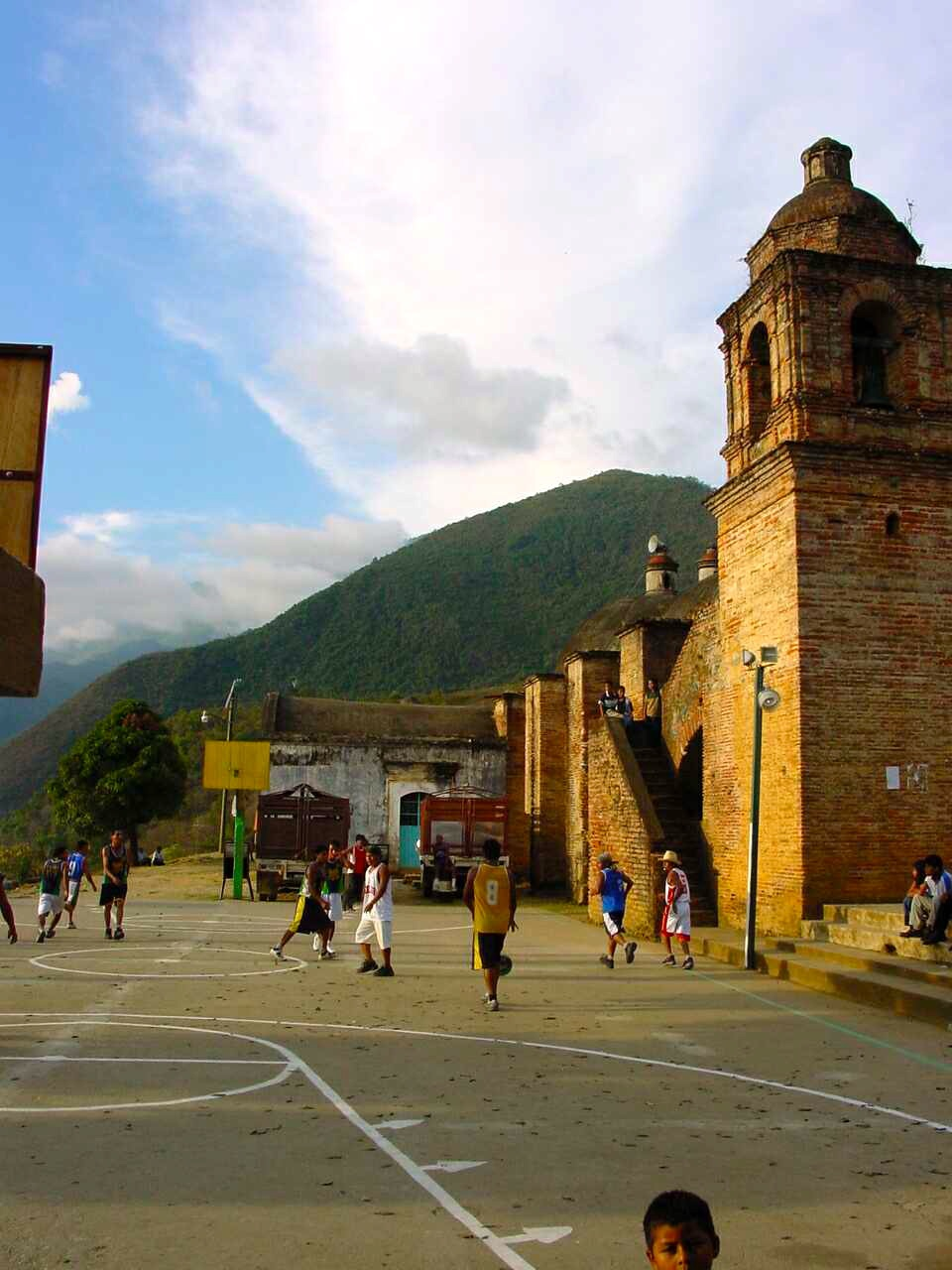
- Santiago Xanica
- Interactive map of Santiago Xanica
- Country: Mexico
- State: Oaxaca

Population (2005)
  - Total: 3,029
- Time zone: UTC-6 (Central Standard Time)

Santiago Xanica is a town and municipality in Oaxaca in south-western Mexico. The municipality covers an area of 137.2 km^{2} (53.0 sq mi).

It is part of the Miahuatlán District in the south of the Sierra Sur Region.

== Demography ==
As of 2020, the municipality had a total population of 3,029 inhabitants, with 49.2% woman, and 50.8% men.
