= Ocotlán Zapotec =

Zapotec language of Oaxaca, Mexico

- (San Antonio Ocotlán)
- Native to: Mexico
- Region: Oaxaca
- Native speakers: (15,000 cited 1993)
- Language family: Oto-Manguean: Zapotecan; Zapotec; Central; Valley; Extended Ocotepec; Ocotlán Zapotec

Language codes
- ISO 639-3: zac
- Glottolog: ocot1244
- ELP: Ocotlán

Ocotlán Zapotec (San Antonio Ocotlán Zapotec, Ocotlán Oeste Zapotec, Zapoteco del Poniente de Ocotlán) is a Zapotec language of Oaxaca, Mexico.
