= San Pedro, Oaxaca =

San Pedro, Oaxaca may refer to:

- San Pedro Amuzgos
- San Pedro Apóstol
- San Pedro Atoyac
- San Pedro Cajonos
- San Pedro Comitancillo
- San Pedro Coxcaltepec Cántaros
- San Pedro El Alto
- San Pedro Huamelula
- San Pedro Huilotepec
- San Pedro Ixcatlán
- San Pedro Ixtlahuaca
- San Pedro Jaltepetongo
- San Pedro Jicayan
- San Pedro Jocotipac
- San Pedro Juchatengo
- San Pedro Molinos
- San Pedro Nopala
- San Pedro Ocopetatillo
- San Pedro Ocotepec
- San Pedro Pochutla
- San Pedro Quiatoni
- San Pedro Sochiapam
- San Pedro Tapanatepec
- San Pedro Taviche
- San Pedro Teozacoalco
- San Pedro Teutila
- San Pedro Tidaá
- San Pedro Topiltepec
- San Pedro Totolapa
- San Pedro Yaneri
- San Pedro Yólox
- San Pedro Yucunama

== See also ==
- San Pedro Mártir (disambiguation)
- San Pedro Mixtepec (disambiguation)
- San Pedro y San Pablo (disambiguation)
