= San Sebastián Nicananduta =

- Municipality and town
- Location in Mexico
- Coordinates: 17°31′00.1200″N 97°40′59.8800″W
- Country: Mexico
- State: Oaxaca

Population (2005)
  - Total: 1,412
- Time zone: UTC-6 (Central Standard Time)

San Sebastián Nicananduta is a town and municipality in Oaxaca in south-western Mexico. The municipality covers an area of km^{2}. It is part of the Teposcolula District in the center of the Mixteca Region.

As of 2005, the municipality had a total population of .

== Etymology ==
The word Nicananduta, comes from Mixtec Nica: "calls or gushes" and ndute: "water" and means "Place where water gushes".

== History ==
This town was founded approximately in 1700, by function of several neighboring towns. This originated from the abundance of springs and some fruit species, such as apple, Peach, tejocote and Capulín; Likewise by the abundance of wood.

The first name of the town was in the 17th century with denomination San Sebastián del Rincón, following its course until 1780, then it was named San Sebastián de Almoloya, later in the year of 1886 was held as a municipality with the name of San Sebastian Nicananduta to the present day.

At the time of the Mexican Revolution this community was the Zapatista Army barracks and was the C. Jerónimo Orlae, Caudillo of the Agraristas as well as the C. Diódoro battle, Antirreleccionista who fought the Porfirismo and was banished, taught to read and write, the people protected him.

Since the founding of the people education was paid with different educators until 1930, then began the federal primary education with the name of José María Morelos Pavón counting on the first teacher named Josefina Solis.

=== Notable Events ===
Year	Event
1909	There was an armed conflict against the neighboring town of San Antonino Monteverde, in which they had to sell their goat cattle, 2 bells owned by the people all to raise a certain amount of money to free their prisoners who were transferred to the City of Tlaxiaco
1980	On January 20, there was an explosion of fireworks in one of the classrooms of the primary school where 3 people were severely wounded and burned and later died from their injuries.
1984	There was an explosion in the center of town in the morning around 2am, it is estimated that the amount of explosives that detonated was about 20 boxes. In the explosion 7 people were injured 1 person from the community and the other 6 from the company Hermanos Borgolla.
1999	In the month of June there was an earthquake with a scale of 7on the Richter scale, where several buildings were damaged including the church, and several schools.

== Geography ==
=== Location ===
It is located in the western part of the Mixteca Region at a height of 2,360 meters above sea level.

It limits to the north with Santa Maria Chilapa de Díaz, to the west with San Antonino Monte Verde, San Juan Ñumí and San Pedro Yucuxaco to the south, to the east with San Pedro and San Pablo Teposcolula; its approximate distance to the capital of the state Oaxaca is 135 kilometers.

The total area of the municipality is 45.06 km^{2} and the surface of the municipality in relation to the state is 0.05%.

Towards the south of the population some quite vegetative mountainous hills are located with an altitude approximately of 3,000 meters of height on the level of the sea, towards the northwest side of the population some rather rocky hills with an altitude of approximately 2,500 msnm are located.

Nicananduta is surrounded by two mountains Cerro Ticóndo and Cerro El Tambor.

==== Cerro Ticóndo ====
The land around Cerro Ticóndo is located mainly in the hills, but to the southwest is the mountain. The surrounding area is at an altitude of 2,989 meters and 2.8 km south of Cerro Ticóndo. Around 9 people per square kilometer around Cerro Ticóndo have a small population. The less densely populated city is San Andrés Dinicuiti, 18.1 km north of Cerro Ticóndo. Almost distributed in the vicinity of the Ticóndo hill. [4] In the region around Cerro Ticóndo, the field is very common.

==== Cerro El Tambor ====
The terrain around Cerro El Tambor is quite typical of the countryside. The surrounding area has an altitude of 3,046 meters and 1.1 km west of Cerro El Tambor. There are approximately 9 people per square kilometer. around Cerro El Tambor with a small population. The least populated city is San Miguel Monteverde, 13.5 km west of Cerro El Tambor. Almost covered with El Tambor hill and its surroundings. [4] In the region around Cerro El Tambor, the field is very common.

==== Rivers ====
Towards the south side of the town several springs are located, leading 2 rivers that go to the center of the population in a north direction towards the south side of the mountains, a river is located towards the city of Tlaxiaco.

=== Climate ===
It is characterized with 3 types of cold climate of the population towards the south, temperate of the population with north direction, warm to the north of the population with direction to the town of Santo Domingo Yodohino.

=== Flora and Fauna ===
Nicananduta includes many types of flora and fauna including Trees: Oaks, Montezuma Pine, Madrona, Junipers, Cactus leaves, Agave Americana. Fauna including: Deer, rabbits, coyotes, foxes, birds of different species, armadillos, squirrels, among others.

== Culture ==
=== Popular Festivities ===
In the town an annual party is celebrated, in honor of the patron saint San Sebastián Mártir, for this reason there is a fair on 19, 20 and 21 January.

=== Traditions ===
Jaripeos (cowboy festivals), basketball games, fireworks, counts and coronation of the village queen and her princess, doing great dances, among other social events.

=== Music ===
There is regional band music and conjunto (small musical group) music.

=== Artisans ===
In the population the weaving of the petate (mats), tenate (baskets), made by women.

=== Gastronomy ===
The typical and traditional foods of the town are: tamales, mole, pozole, regional sauce and without missing the delicious beef broth.

== Government ==
=== Main Locality ===
The main town is the municipal seat.

=== Characterization of City Hall ===
- The mayor
- A Trustee
- 3 councilors (Treasury, Works, Health and Education)
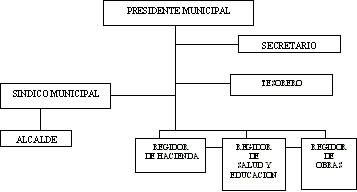
  Organization and Structure of the Municipal Public Administration

=== Organization and Structure of the Municipal Public Administration ===
==== Functions ====
Municipal President: He is in charge of managing the resources that the municipality receives, as well as coping with municipal, state and federal policies.

Municipal Trustee: He is in charge of assisting the public prosecutor in the first steps.

Treasurer: Together with the President, Trustee and Treasurer, they form the Finance Commission and are responsible for administering the municipality's resources.

Board of Education: He is in charge of educational establishments, such as kindergarten, primary and telesecundaria (High School).

Councilor of Works: In charge of public works carried out in the municipality.

===== Auxiliary Authorities =====
Delegates of the communities

==== Political Regionalization ====
The municipality belongs to the 3rd federal electoral district and to the 9th local electoral district.

==== Municipal Regulation ====
The municipality has Municipal Ordinances.

==== Chronology of the Municipal Presidents ====
Municipal President	Period of government	
Anastasio Avendaño	1900	
Carlos Pérez	1901	
Pedro Avendaño	1902	
Pablo Antonio	1903	
José Silvestre Martínez	1904	
Lorenzo Pérez	1905	
Felipe Santos	1906	
José Maria Ramos	1907	
Mariano Cruz Rosales	1908	
Felipe Santos	1909	
Francisco Cruz	1910	
Felipe Santos	1911	
Apolonio Vásquez	1912	
Martín Santos	1913	
Domingo Reyes	1914	
Jacinto Antonio	1915	
Victoriano Santos	1916	
Miguel Mendoza	1917	
Carlos Pérez	1918	
Mariano Cruz Rosales	1919	
Severiano Santos	1920	
José Esteban Santos	1921	
Arcadio Santos	1922-1923	
Mariano Cruz	1924	
Carlos Pérez	1926	
Albino Santos	1927	
Arcadio Santos	1928	
Trinidad Díaz	1929	
Manuel Antonio	1930	
Jacinto Hernández	1931	
Romualdo Avendaño	1932	
Severiano Santos	1934	
Pablo Santiago	1935	
Genaro Santos	1936	
Trinidad Díaz	1937	
Santiago Ramírez	1938	
Francisco Santos	1939	
Marcelino Rodríguez	1940	
Santiago Ramírez	1941-1942	
Pascual Salazar	1943-1944	
Félix Santos	1945-1946	
Margarito Sánchez	1947-1948	
Genaro Santos	1949-1950	
Rosario de Jesús	1951-1952	
Calixto Hernández	1953-1954	
Crescencio Rodríguez	1955	
Lorenzo Cruz Rosales	1956	
Marcelino Rodríguez	1957-1958	
Sebero de Jesús	1959	
Plácido Rodríguez Ramírez	1960	
Nicolás Cruz Sánchez	1961	
Plácido Rodríguez Ramírez	1962	
Guadalupe Cruz de Jesús	1963	
Daniel Cruz Rosales	1964	
Cipriano Vásquez Santos	1965	
Sebastián Rodríguez Ramírez	1966	
Crescencio Reyes Martínez	1967	
Isaac Bautista de Jesús	1968	
Andrés Cruz Salazar	1969	
Pablo Hernández Antonio	1970	
Andrés Cruz Salazar	1971	
Marcelino de Jesús Sánchez	1972	
Pablo Hernández (Falleció)	1973	
Hermelindo Bautista Hernández (Suplió)	1973	
Evaristo Santiago Hernández	1974	
Apolinar Rodríguez Santos	1975	
Pascual Santos Antonio	1976	
Fidel Ramos Reyes	1977	
Gregorio Bautista Sánchez	1978	
Pedro Morales De Jesús	1979	
Bruno Bautista Sánchez	1980	
Crescencio Reyes Martínez	1981	
Daniel Ruíz Resáles	1982	
Román de Jesús Santiago	1983	
Nemesio de Jesús	1984	
Hermelindo Bautista Hernández	1985	
Anacleto Martínez Cruz	1986	
Sabino Cruz de Jesús	1987	
Ceferino Ortiz Hernández	1988	
Norberto de Jesús Santos	1989	
Florencio Santiago Santos	1990	
Pedro Martínez Miranda	1991	
Florentino Ramos Cruz	1992	
Aurelio Cruz Velásquez	1993	PRI
Leonardo Hernández Rodríguez	1994	PRI
Galdino Rosales Martínez	1995	PRI
Eulogio Rodríguez Ramírez	1996	UYC
Bernardo Santos Sánchez	1997	UYC
Cornelio Cruz de Jesús	1998	UYC
Justino Rodríguez Ramírez	1999	UYC
Fulgencio Cruz de Jesús	2000	UYC
Máximo Pérez Rodríguez	2001	UYC
Felipe de Jesús Cruz	2002-2004	UYC
Gerardo Cruz de Jesús	2005-2007	UYC
Aureliano Bautista Martínez	2008-2010	UYC
Roberto de Jesús Santos	2011-2013	UYC
Lorenzo Martínez Cruz	2013-2014	UYC
Amadeo Ramos Pérez	2015	UYC
