= Santiago Nejapilla =

Coordinates: 17°26′N 97°22′W

Santiago Nejapilla Santiago Nejapilla
- Municipality and town
- Santiago Nejapilla
- Interactive map of Santiago Nejapilla
- Country: Mexico
- State: Oaxaca
- Elevation: 2,255 m (7,398 ft)
- Highest elevation: 2,824 m (9,265 ft)
- Lowest elevation: 2,211 m (7,254 ft)

Population (2020)
  - Total: 174
- Time zone: UTC-6 (Central Standard Time)

Santiago Nejapilla is a town and municipality in Oaxaca in southeastern Mexico and is the fourth least populous municipality in Oaxaca, only being more populous than Santiago Tepetlapa, Santo Domingo Tlatayapam, and Santa Magdalena Jicotlán. It is part of the Teposcolula District in the center of the Mixteca Region.

The municipality of Santiago Nejapilla has a population of less than 500 people.
