= Teposcolula =

Teposcolula may refer to:

- San Pedro y San Pablo Teposcolula, town in Oaxaca, Mexico
- San Juan Teposcolula, town in Oaxaca, Mexico
- Teposcolula District, district of Oaxaca, Mexico
