= Concepción Buenavista =

- Municipality and town
- Location in Mexico
- Coordinates: 17°53′N 97°24′W
- Country: Mexico
- State: Oaxaca

Area
  - Total: 357.23 km^{2} (137.93 sq mi)

Population (2005)
  - Total: 828
- Time zone: UTC-6 (Central Standard Time)

Kiosk

Concepción Buenavista is a town and municipality in Oaxaca in southeastern Mexico, being the fifth least densely populated municipality in Oaxaca; only four Oaxacan municipalities are more sparsely populated than it: San Miguel Tenango, Santa Magdalena Jicotlán, Santa María Ixcatlán, and Santa María Chimalapa. It covers an area of 357.23 km^{2} and is part of the Coixtlahuaca district in the Mixteca Region. In 2005 it had a population of 828.
