= San Vicente Nuñú =

- Municipality and town
- Location in Mexico
- Coordinates: 17°28′N 97°27′W
- Country: Mexico
- State: Oaxaca

Population (2010)
  - Total: 493
- Time zone: UTC-6 (Central Standard Time)

A Dia de Muertos celebration in San Vicente Nuñú, Oaxaca

San Vicente Nuñú is a town and municipality in Oaxaca in south-western Mexico. The municipality covers an area of km^{2}. It is part of the Teposcolula District in the center of the Mixteca Region.

As of 2010, the municipality had a total population of 493.
