= San Antonio Acutla =

- Municipality and town
- Location in Mexico
- Coordinates: 17°44′N 97°30′W
- Country: Mexico
- State: Oaxaca

Area
  - Total: 20.41 km^{2} (7.88 sq mi)

Population (2005)
  - Total: 311
- Time zone: UTC-6 (Central Standard Time)

San Antonio Acutla is a town and municipality in Oaxaca in south-western Mexico. The municipality covers an area of 20.41 km^{2}. It is part of the Teposcolula District in the center of the Mixteca Region.

As of 2005, the municipality had a total population of 311.
