= San Francisco Teopan =

- Municipality and town
- Location in Mexico
- Coordinates: 17°51′N 97°29′W
- Country: Mexico
- State: Oaxaca

Area
  - Total: 45.93 km^{2} (17.73 sq mi)

Population (2005)
  - Total: 390
- Time zone: UTC-6 (Central Standard Time)

San Francisco Teopan is a town and municipality in Oaxaca in south-western Mexico. The municipality covers an area of 45.93 km^{2}. It is part of the Coixtlahuaca District in the Mixteca Region.

As of 2005, the municipality had a total population of 390.
