= Santiago Yolomécatl =

Coordinates: 17°29′N 97°34′W

- Municipality and town
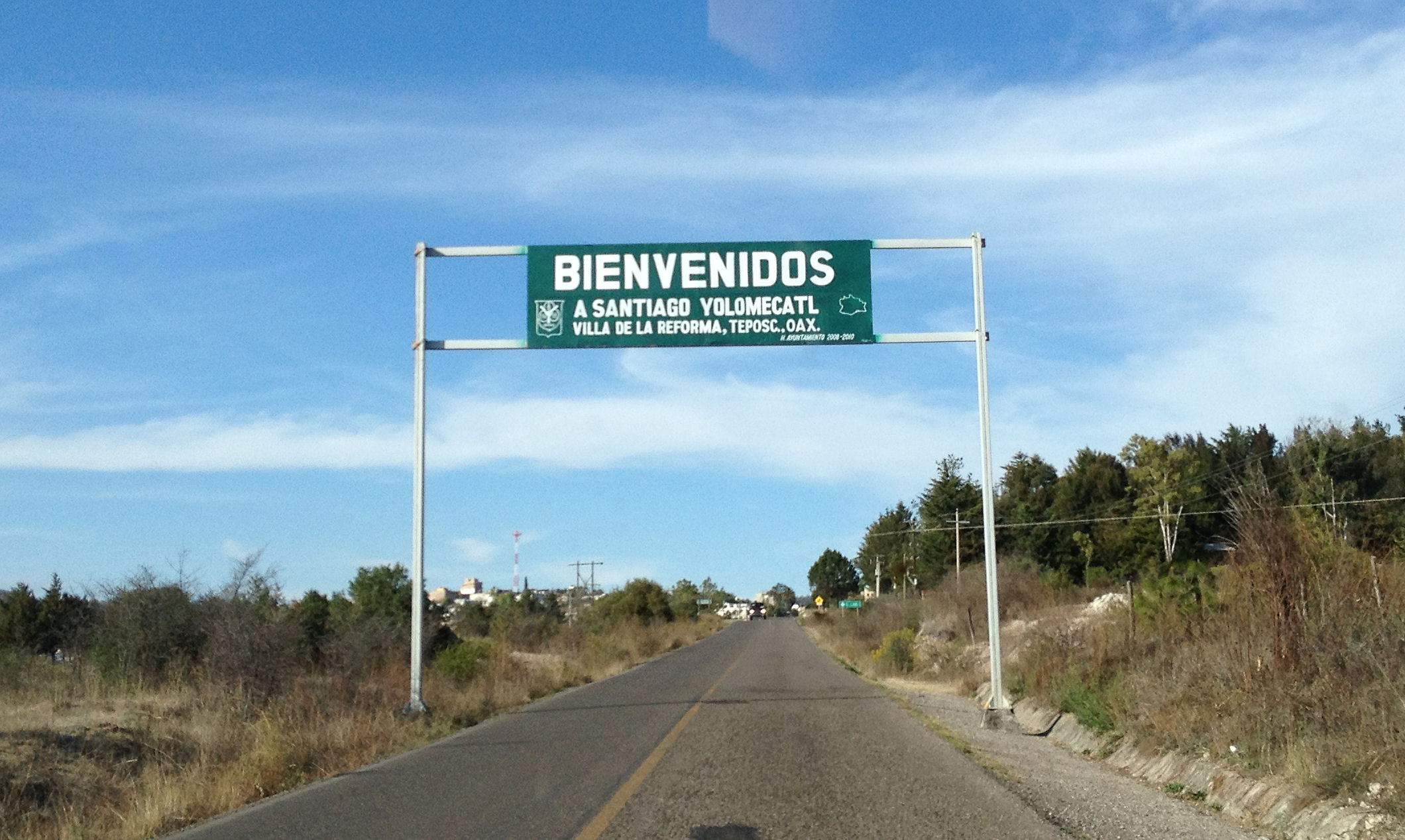
- Entrance Sign
- Interactive map of Santiago Yolomécatl
- Country: Mexico
- State: Oaxaca
- Time zone: UTC-6 (Central Standard Time)

Santiago Yolomécatl is a town and municipality in Oaxaca in south-western Mexico. The municipality covers an area of km^{2}. It is part of the Teposcolula District in the center of the Mixteca Region.

As of 2005, the municipality had a total population of .
