= La Trinidad Vista Hermosa =

- Municipality and town
- Location in Mexico
- Coordinates: 17°45′N 97°30′W
- Country: Mexico
- State: Oaxaca

Area
  - Total: 31.9 km^{2} (12.3 sq mi)

Population (2005)
  - Total: 235
- Time zone: UTC-6 (Central Standard Time)

La Trinidad Vista Hermosa is a town and municipality in Oaxaca in south-western Mexico.

== Geography ==
The municipality covers an area of 31.9 km^{2}. It is part of the Teposcolula District in the center of the Mixteca Region. This municipality is located at the north east part of the state, at 2,160 meters above the sea level height. Its limits are: north with Santa Magdalena Jicotlán and south with San Antonio Acut. It has a three inches stream of water. From this stream was built a dam to irrigate benefiting the citizens of the community. The weather is usually cold and dry. The municipality has a single natural resource, stone used in foundations.

== Demography ==
As of 2005, the municipality had a total population of 235.

== Culture and Traditions ==
The main historic monument dates back to 1869 and it is made of rock and mud. Each year a dance festival is held in honor of “La Santisima Trinidad” the town's patron. One main characteristic from this place is their unique music produced by wind. The main artisans sold are made out of palm. The variety of food is present by the use of different seasonal condiments such as: yosichi, the niyolli, the cacallas, flower spoon, the llavindodo and nopales. Some examples of the typical food are pozole, mole and barbacoa mass with. The main economic activity consists of agriculture. The main crops grown are wheat, beans and corn. Cows and porks are also raised and sold as cattle heads. According to the numbers from 2000 presented by the INEGI, the municipality's economically active population is 86 persons employed.

== Government ==
The town authorities are the Municipal President, a trustee and 3 aldermen (Hacienda, Education and work). The Municipal President administrates the municipality resources and decides the actions to be taken in behalf of the town. The town belongs to the 3rd federal electoral district and to the 9th local electoral district. This municipality has a municipal police service and auxiliary authorities such as: Police agency El Moral and Police agency EL Encinal. The functions that perform these auxiliary authorities are: Represent their settlement to the City Council, perform work in the various steps to cover or request works and actions for their community as well as ensuring the safety and peace of the congregation and manage their different needs.
