= Santo Domingo Tonaltepec =

Coordinates: 17°36′N 97°22′W

- Municipality and town
- Interactive map of Santo Domingo Tonaltepec
- Country: Mexico
- State: Oaxaca

Population (2005)
  - Total: 291
- Time zone: UTC-6 (Central Standard Time)

Santo Domingo Tonaltepec is a town and municipality in Oaxaca, located in south-western Mexico. The municipality covers an area of km^{2}. It is part of the Teposcolula District in the center of the Mixteca Region.

As of 2005, the municipality had a total population of 291.
