= San Cristóbal Suchixtlahuaca =

- Municipality and town
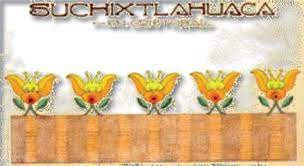
- Coat of arms

- Location in Mexico
- Coordinates: 17°43′37″N 97°22′00″W
- Country: Mexico
- State: Oaxaca

Area
  - Total: 44.65 km^{2} (17.24 sq mi)

Population (2005)
  - Total: 244
- Time zone: UTC-6 (Central Standard Time)

San Cristóbal Suchixtlahuaca is a town and municipality in Oaxaca in south-western Mexico. The municipality covers an area of 44.65 km^{2}. It is part of the Coixtlahuaca District in the Mixteca Region.

As of 2005, the municipality had a total population of 244.

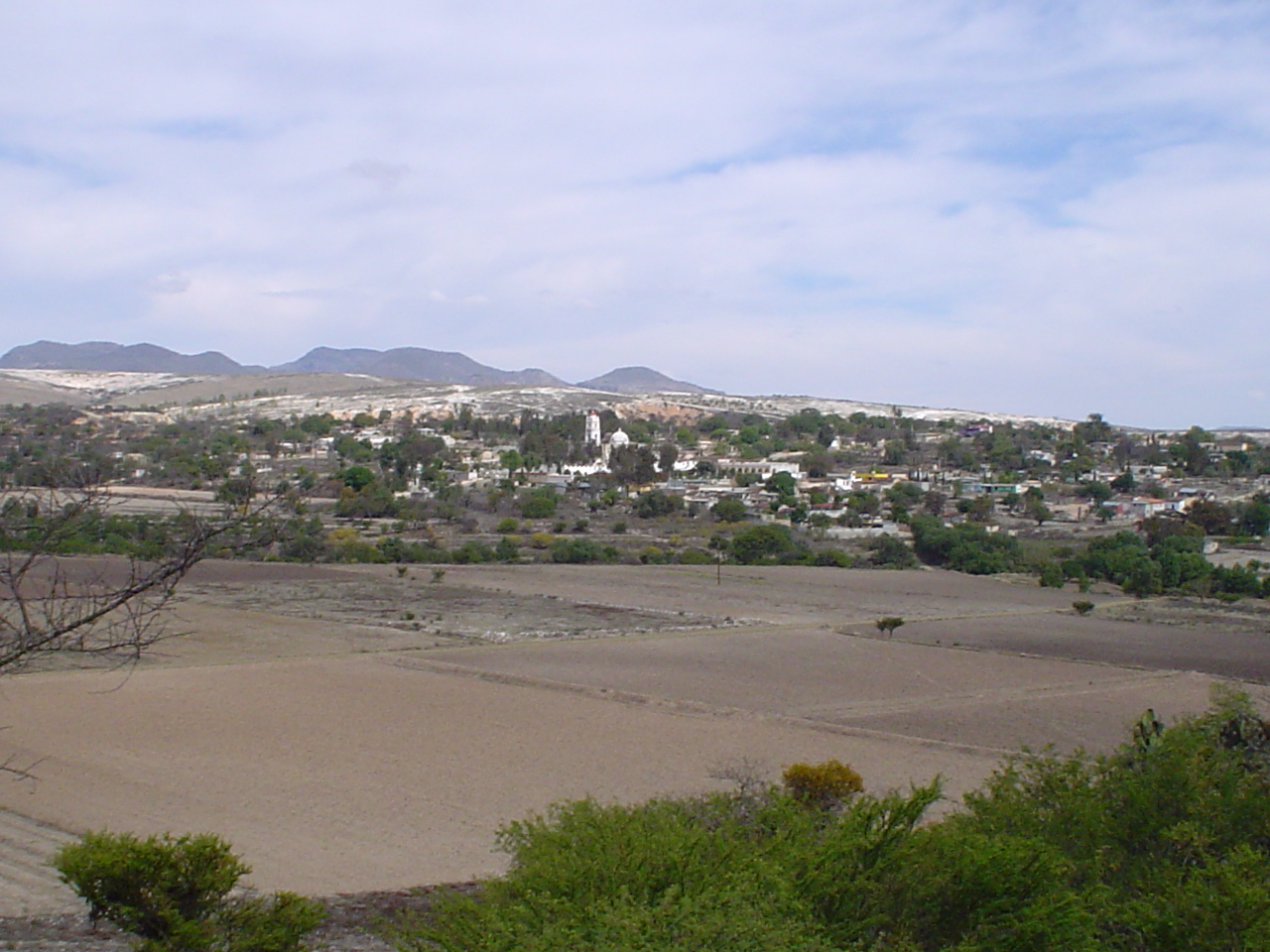
View of the municipality

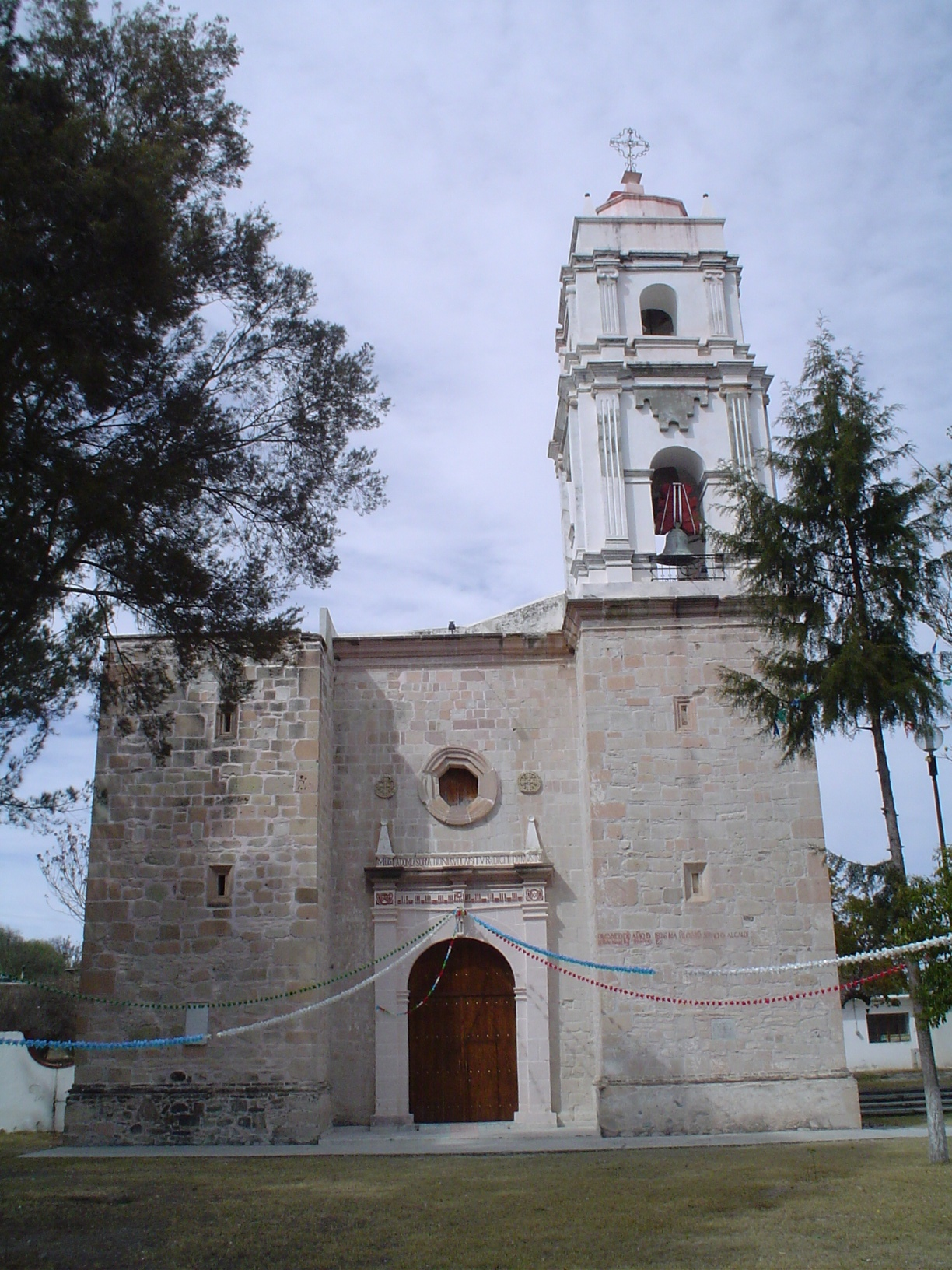
Church in San Cristobal

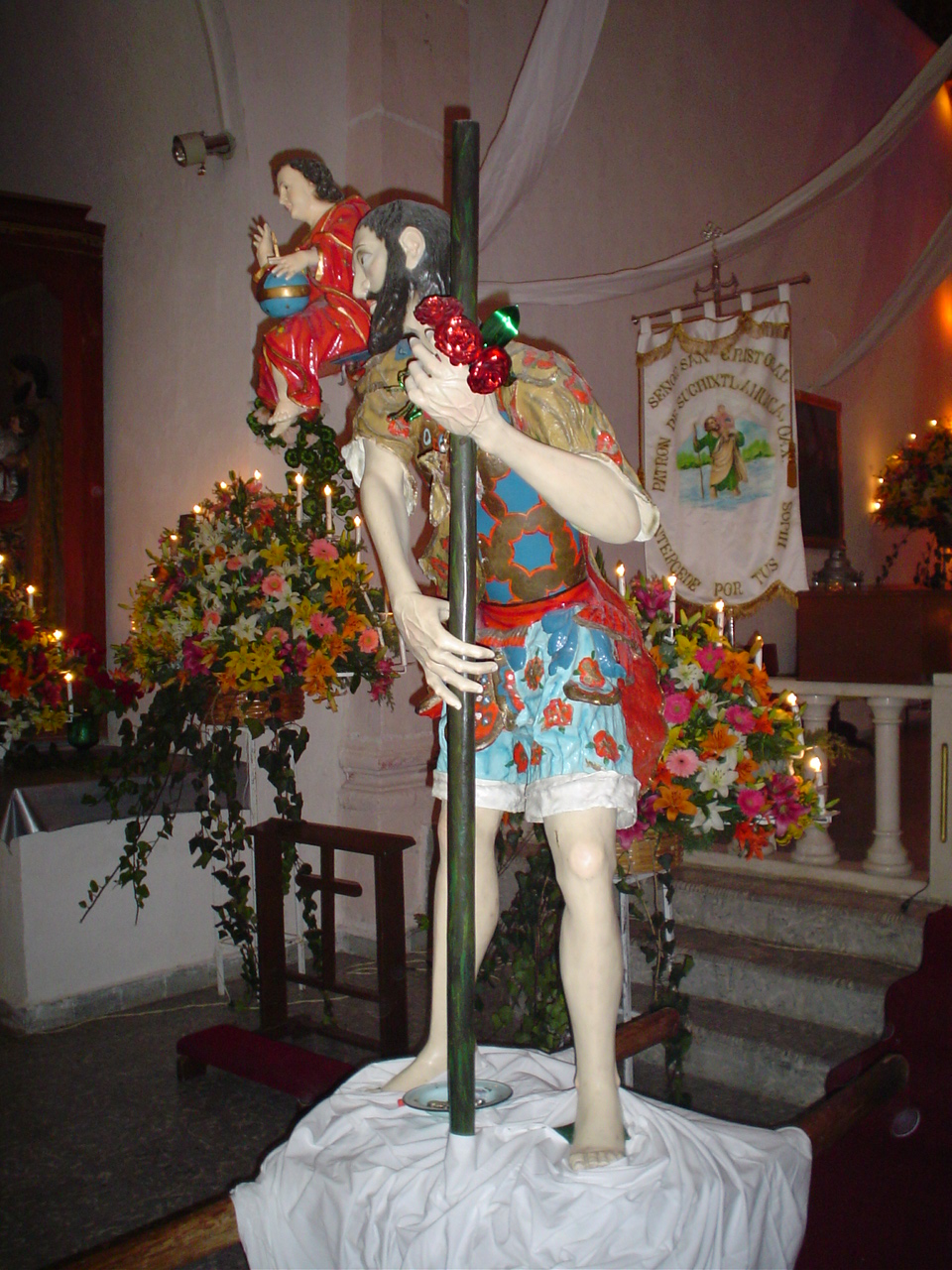
Patron saint of San Cristobal

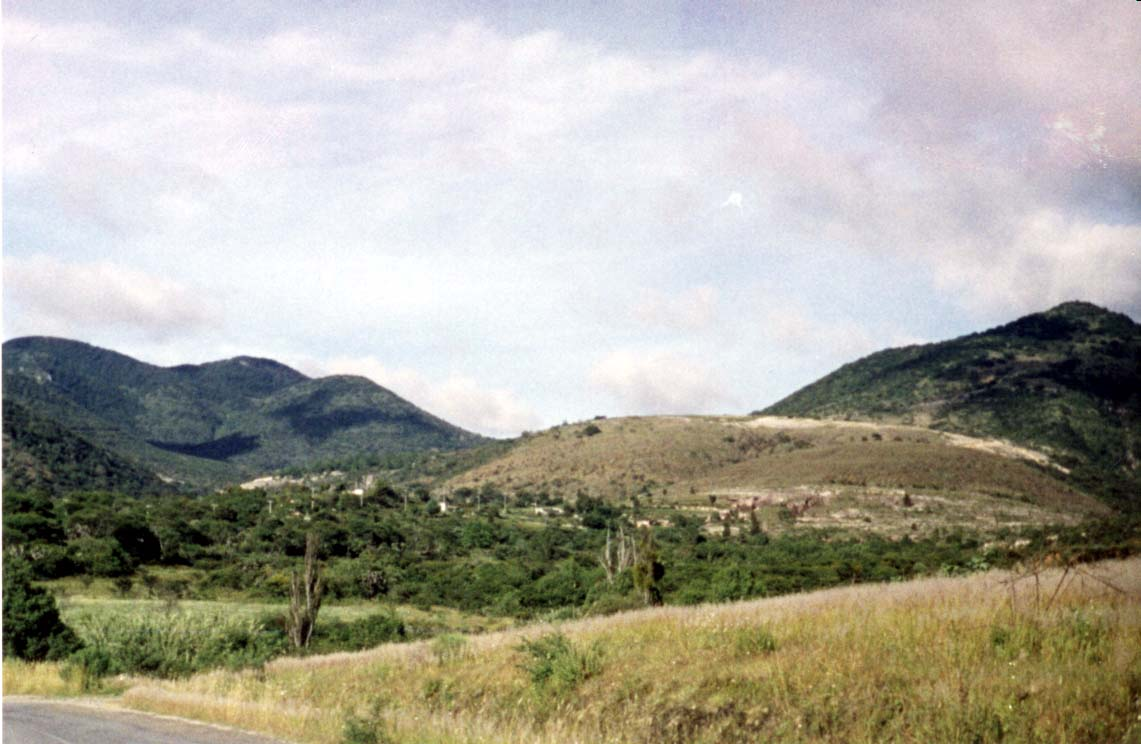
Barrio la costa
