= San Andrés Lagunas =

- Municipality and town
- Location in Mexico
- Coordinates: 17°34′N 97°31′W
- Country: Mexico
- State: Oaxaca

Area
  - Total: 100.8 km^{2} (38.9 sq mi)

Population (2005)
  - Total: 528
- Time zone: UTC-6 (Central Standard Time)

San Andrés Lagunas is a town and municipality in Oaxaca in south-western Mexico. The municipality was founded in 1520. It was named San Andres Laguna in honor of the Patron Saint "San andres" and "Lagunas" because it has three lagoons, Laguna Grande, Laguna de Nuu Chita, and Laguna.

== Geography ==
The municipality covers an area of 100.8 km^{2}. It is part of the Teposcolula District in the center of the Mixteca Region. Here the environment is fairly humid and as for the result it has different types of flora and fauna. This place has many hills along the territory forming a mountain range alongside, but it lacks rivers.

== Demography ==
As of 2005, the municipality had a total population of 528. Most of which are Catholic.

== Infrastructure ==
San Andres Laguna's government provides the society with several services. The children from these municipalities have the opportunity to go to elementary school, middle school and high school or to schools dedicated to learn how to give the proper definition and expression to a word that is not in Spanish. Also it exist the I.M.S.S. which is a hospital that helps people that have lower incomes; they provide medical care and have the responsibility to give pension when people are retired. The public services that San Andres Laguna's have is the drinking water to every house there is in the place and the public lighting which are all over the municipalities. In addition the people have the television and radio signal and public telephones. There are several pavement roads that merge with different federal highway and connect the municipality with the city of Oaxaca and to the near towns around San Andres Lagunas.

== Economy ==
Principal economic activities include agriculture, fishing, mining, forestry and tourism. There are also people dedicated to the production of mezcal which is the fermentation of maguey plant.

== Culture ==
This municipality has a strong set of traditions involving the catholic religions. They worship San Andres Apostol and there is a celebration on November 30 which everyone gathers around to dance and celebrate. The people here even have a temple dedicated this saint. It had to have repairs because of earthquakes, but is now in good conditions. They also celebrate the death and every other saint. Their traditional food involves mole, tamales, barbecue and pozole.
