= Teotongo =

- Municipality and town
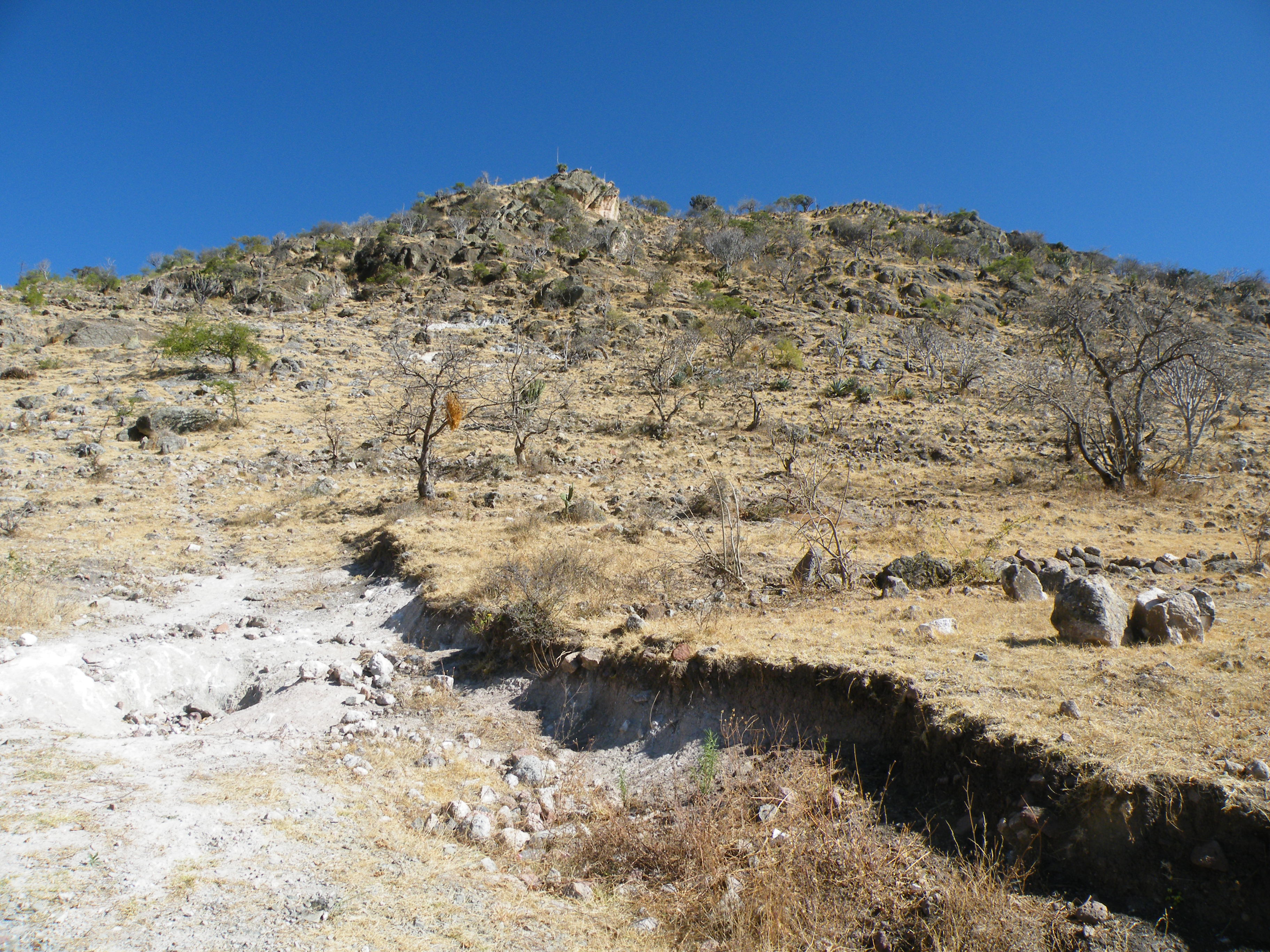
- Teotongo

- Location in Mexico
- Coordinates: 17°43′N 97°32′W
- Country: Mexico
- State: Oaxaca
- Time zone: UTC-6 (Central Standard Time)

Teotongo is a town and municipality in Oaxaca in south-western Mexico. The municipality covers an area of km^{2}. It is part of the Teposcolula District in the center of the Mixteca Region.

As of 2005, the municipality had a total population of .
