= Santo Domingo Tlatayapam =

Santo Domingo Tlatayápam
- Municipality and town
- Location in Mexico
- Coordinates: 17°24′24″N 97°20′46″W
- Country: Mexico
- State: Oaxaca

Area
  - Municipality and town: 12 km^{2} (4.6 sq mi)
- Elevation: 2,248 m (7,375 ft)

Population (2010)
  - Municipality and town: 153
  - Urban: 147
- Time zone: UTC-6 (Central Standard Time)

Santo Domingo Tlatayápam is a village and small municipality in Oaxaca in south-western Mexico. The municipality covers an area of 12 km^{2}. It is part of the Teposcolula District in the center of the Mixteca Region.

== Demography ==
As of the 2010 census, the village had a population of 147 inhabitants, while the municipality had a total population of 153 inhabitants. It is the third-smallest municipality in Mexico in population (following Santa Magdalena Jicotlán and Santiago Tepetlapa, both also in Oaxaca).
