= San Miguel Tulancingo =

- Municipality and town
- Location in Mexico
- Coordinates: 17°44′N 97°26′W
- Country: Mexico
- State: Oaxaca

Area
  - Total: 53.59 km^{2} (20.69 sq mi)

Population (2005)
  - Total: 336
- Time zone: UTC-6 (Central Standard Time)

San Miguel Tulancingo is a town and municipality in Oaxaca in south-western Mexico. The municipality covers an area of 53.59 square kilometres (20.69 mi^{2}). It is part of the Coixtlahuaca district in the Mixteca Region.

As of 2005, the municipality had a total population of 336.
