= Tepelmeme Villa de Morelos =

- Municipality and town
- Location in Mexico
- Coordinates: 17°52′N 97°22′W
- Country: Mexico
- State: Oaxaca
- Elevation: 2,120 m (6,960 ft)

Population (2005)
  - Total: 419
- Time zone: UTC-6 (Central Standard Time)

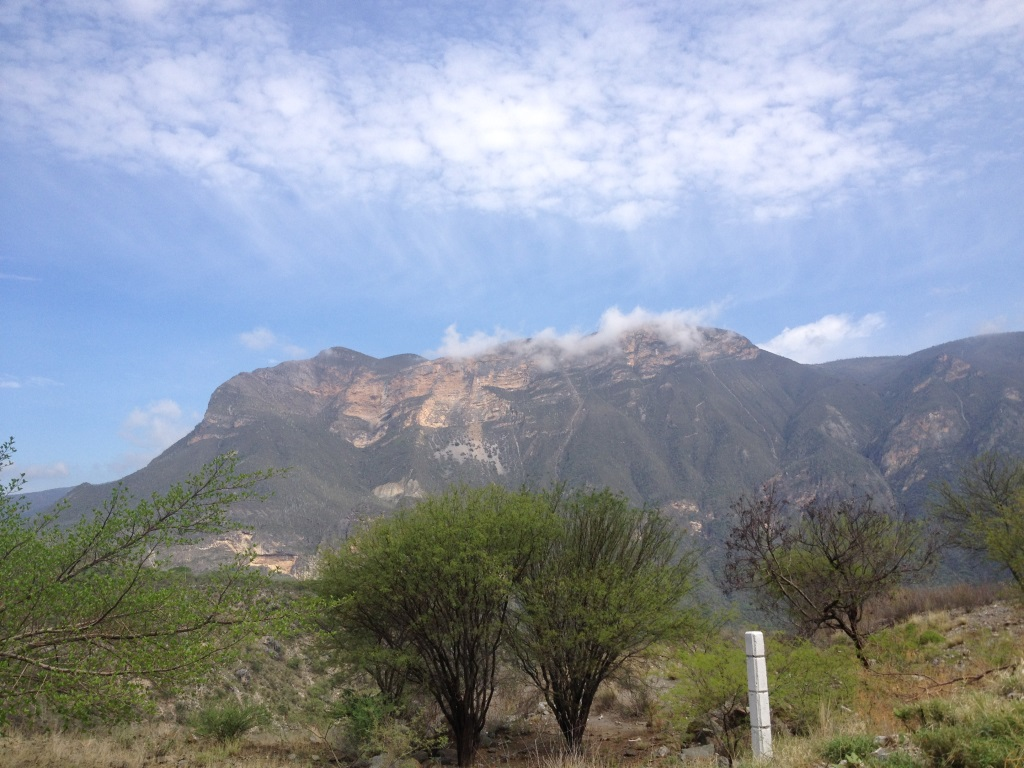
Tepelmeme Villa de Morelos, Oax., Mexico

Tepelmeme Villa de Morelos is a town and municipality in Oaxaca in south-western Mexico. It is part of the Coixtlahuaca District in the Mixteca Region.

As of 2005, the municipality had a total population of 419.
