= San Mateo Tlapiltepec =

- Municipality and town
- Location in Mexico
- Coordinates: 17°48′N 97°25′W
- Country: Mexico
- State: Oaxaca
- Established: 1583

Area
  - Total: 37 km^{2} (14 sq mi)

Population (2005)
  - Total: 226
- Time zone: UTC-6 (Central Standard Time)

San Mateo Tlapiltepec is a town and municipality in Oaxaca in south-western Mexico. The municipality covers an area of 37 km^{2}. It is part of the Coixtlahuaca district in the Mixteca Region.

As of 2005, the municipality had a total population of 226.
