= José M. López =

Mexican World War II Medal of Honor recipient

José Mendoza López
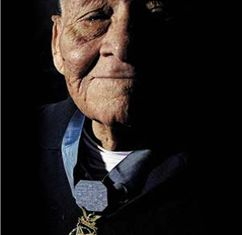
- Master Sergeant José M. López, Medal of Honor
- Born: July 10, 1910; Santiago Ihuitlán Plumas, Oaxaca
- Died: May 16, 2005 (aged 94); San Antonio, Texas
- Burial place: Fort Sam Houston National Cemetery, San Antonio, Texas
- Military career
- Allegiance: United States of America
- Branch: United States Army
- Service years: 1942–1973
- Rank: Master Sergeant
- Units: 3rd Battalion, 23rd Infantry Regiment, U.S. 2nd Infantry Division
- Conflicts: World War II; *Battle of Normandy; *Battle of the Bulge; Korean War
- Awards: Medal of Honor; Purple Heart

José Mendoza López (July 10, 1910 – May 16, 2005) was a Mexican-born United States Army soldier who was awarded the United States' highest military decoration for valor in combat — the Medal of Honor — for his heroic actions during the Battle of the Bulge, in which he single-handedly repulsed a German infantry attack, killing at least 100 enemy troops.

== Early years ==
López was raised by his mother Cándida López in the town of Santiago Ihuitlán Plumas, Oaxaca, Mexico. As a young boy, he and his mother moved to the city of Orizaba, where he helped his mother sell clothes that she made as a seamstress in the city. However, his mother died of tuberculosis when he was only eight years old. López then relocated to Brownsville, Texas, United States, to live with his uncle's family.

While living in Brownsville, López began working various jobs to bring in income and never returned to school. As a young man, López caught the attention of a boxing promoter, and for seven years he traveled the country fighting a total of 55 fights in the lightweight division with the nickname of Kid Mendoza. In 1934, during a boxing match in Melbourne, Victoria, Australia, he met a group of Merchant Marines and signed a contract with them. He was accepted into the union in 1936 and traveled the world for the next five years.

He was en route to California from Hawaii on December 7, 1941, when he learned about the Japanese attack on Pearl Harbor. When he arrived in Los Angeles, the authorities believed he was Japanese, and he was forced to prove otherwise.

López returned to Brownsville and, in 1942, married Emilia Herrera. That same year, he received his draft card and relocated to San Antonio, where he enlisted in the Army. López was first sent to Fort Sam Houston, Texas, and then to Camp Roberts, California, where he received his basic training.

== Medal of Honor citation ==
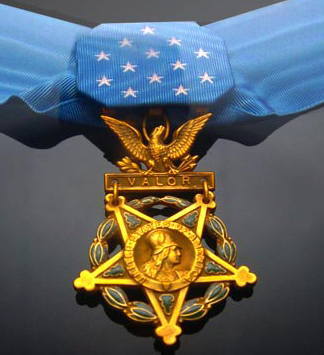

José M. López
Rank and organization: Sergeant, U.S. Army, 23d Infantry, 2d Infantry Division
Place and date: Near Krinkelt, Belgium, December 17, 1944
Entered service at: Brownsville, Texas
Born: Santiago Ihuitlán Plumas, Oaxaca
G.O. No.: 47, June 18, 1945
Citation:

On his own initiative, he carried his heavy machine gun from Company K's right flank to its left in order to protect that flank, which was in danger of being overrun by advancing enemy infantry supported by tanks. Occupying a shallow hole offering no protection above his waist, he cut down a group of 10 Germans. Ignoring enemy fire from an advancing tank, he held his position and cut down 25 more enemy infantry attempting to turn his flank. Glancing to his right, he saw a large number of infantry swarming in from the front. Although dazed and shaken from the enemy artillery fire that had crashed into the ground only a few yards away, he realized that his position would soon be outflanked. Again, alone, he carried his machine gun to a position to the right rear of the sector; enemy tanks and infantry were forcing a withdrawal. Blown backward by the concussion of enemy fire, he immediately reset his gun and continued his fire. Single-handedly, he held off the German horde until he was satisfied that his company had effected its retirement. Again, he loaded his gun on his back, and in a hail of small arms fire, he ran to a point where a few of his comrades were attempting to set up another defense against the onrushing enemy. He fired from this position until his ammunition was exhausted. Still carrying his gun, he fell back with his small group to Krinkelt. Sgt. López's gallantry and intrepidity, on seemingly suicidal missions in which he killed at least 100 of the enemy were almost solely responsible for allowing Company K to avoid being enveloped, to withdraw successfully and to give other forces coming up in support time to build a line which repelled the enemy drive.

== Post-World War II ==
López received an enthusiastic reception when his ship landed in New York City and he was greeted by New York Mayor Fiorello La Guardia. On a visit to Mexico City, he was greeted by the president of Mexico, Manuel Ávila Camacho, and awarded Mexico's highest military commendation, la Condecoración del Mérito Militar.

He later moved his family to San Antonio, where he was hired as a contact representative with the Veterans Administration. Upon the outbreak of the Korean War, López was accidentally ordered to serve for his country and without hesitation was prepared to do so, until President Harry S. Truman, heard of and corrected the matter so that López could remain in the United States.

José Mendoza López died one year after his wife; they were together for 62 years.

== Namesakes ==
The city of Mission, Texas, López' hometown, named a street and a city park — José M. López Park — in his honor.

The North East Independent School District in San Antonio, Texas, named a school in his honor, José M. López Middle School.

Also in San Antonio, a section of Interstate 10 was named in his honor. The designation runs east from Interstate 35 to Loop 1604.

A statue of Sgt. López stands in Brownsville's Veterans Park.

== Awards and decorations ==
Among José M. López's decorations and medals were the following:

Badge	Combat Infantryman Badge with 1 star (denoting 2nd award)		
1st row	Medal of Honor	Bronze Star Medal with 1 Oak leaf cluster (2 awards)	Purple Heart
2nd row	Army Commendation Medal	Army Good Conduct Medal with 4 Good Conduct Loops	American Campaign Medal
3rd row	Asiatic-Pacific Campaign Medal	European–African–Middle Eastern Campaign Medal with 5 Campaign stars	World War II Victory Medal
4th row	Army of Occupation Medal with 'Germany' clasp	National Defense Service Medal with one oak leaf cluster (two awards)	Korean Service Medal with 3 Campaign stars
5th row	Armed Forces Expeditionary Medal	United Nations Korea Medal	Korean War Service Medal
Unit awards	Presidential Unit Citation with 4 Oak Leaf Clusters		Korean Presidential Unit Citation

== See also ==
- List of Hispanic Medal of Honor recipients
- Hispanic Americans in World War II
