= San Pedro Nopala =

- Municipality and town
- Location in Mexico
- Coordinates: 17°48′N 97°32′W
- Country: Mexico
- State: Oaxaca
- District: Teposcolula District

Area
  - Total: 20.41 km^{2} (7.88 sq mi)
- Elevation: 2,180 m (7,150 ft)
- Time zone: UTC-6 (Central Standard Time)

San Pedro Nopala is a town and municipality in Oaxaca in south-western Mexico. It is part of the Teposcolula District in the center of the Mixteca Region. The name Nopala means "Where prickly pear cactus is abundant".

== Geography ==
The municipality covers an area of 20.41 km^{2} at an altitude of 2,180 metres above sea level. The climate is moderate, with temperature no higher than 22 °C. Trees include oak and pine. Wild fauna includes deer, coyote, hares and rabbits.

== Population ==
As of 2005, the municipality had 212 households with a total population of 834 of whom four spoke an indigenous language. Some of the population works in agriculture, growing corn, beans and wheat. Other engage in animal husbandry, raising pigs and cattle. There is some cottage industry production of textiles and palm weaving.
