= Santiago Ihuitlán Plumas =

- Municipality and town
- Location in Mexico
- Coordinates: 17°51′N 97°26′W
- Country: Mexico
- State: Oaxaca
- Time zone: UTC-6 (Central Standard Time)

Santiago Ihuitlán Plumas is a town and municipality in Oaxaca in south-western Mexico. The municipality covers an area of km^{2}. It is part of the Coixtlahuaca District in the Mixteca Region.

As of 2005, the municipality had a total population of 507.
