= San Juan Teposcolula =

- Municipality and town
- Location in Mexico
- Coordinates: 17°33′02″N 97°25′32″W
- Country: Mexico
- State: Oaxaca

Area
  - Total: 57.41 km^{2} (22.17 sq mi)

Population (2005)
  - Total: 1,344
- Time zone: UTC-6 (Central Standard Time)

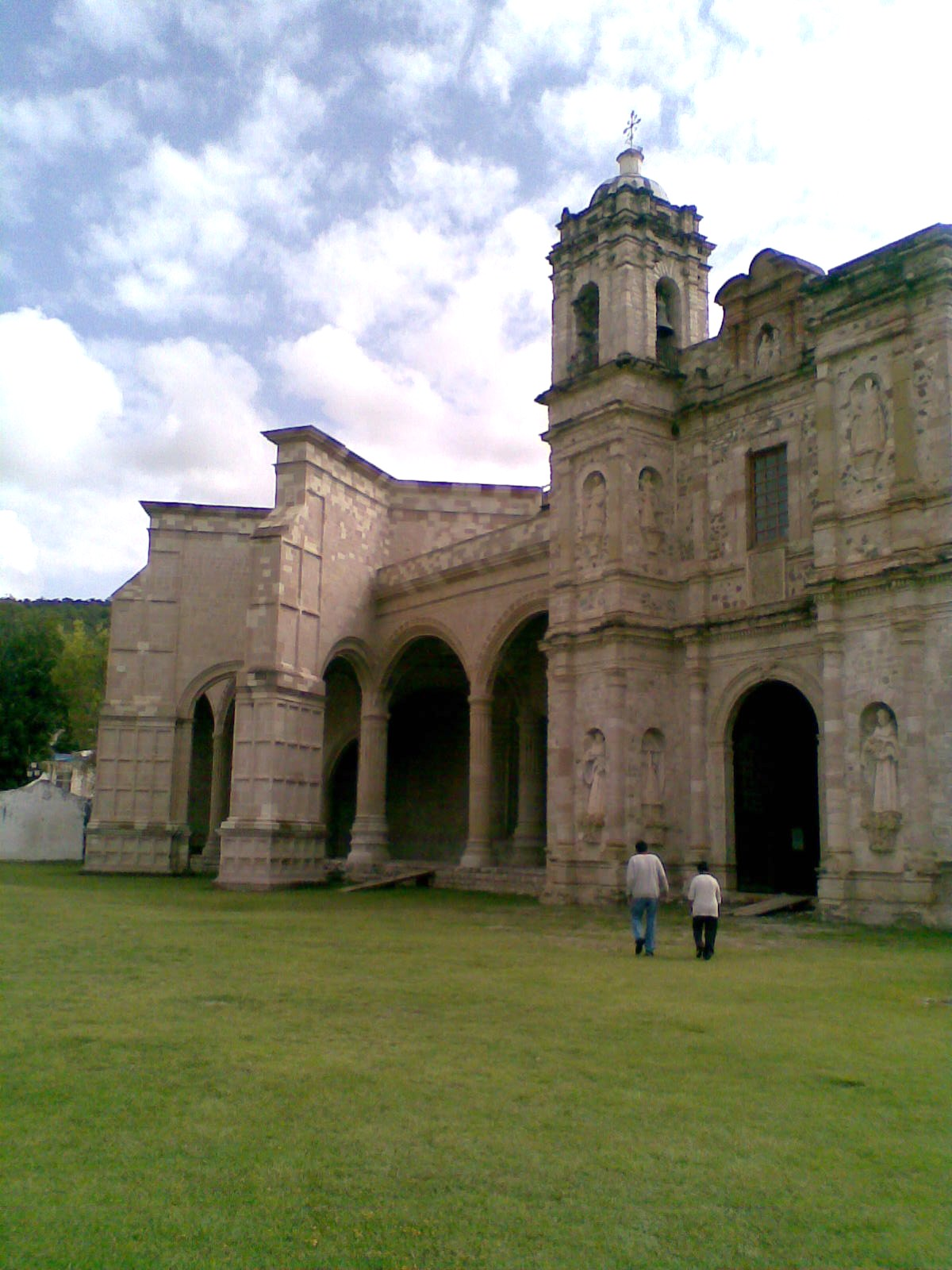
Convent of San Pedro and San Pablo Teposcolula

San Juan Teposcolula is a town and municipality in the State of Oaxaca, Mexico, often known simply as Teposcolula. The name Teposcolula means “next to the twist in copper”.

It is part of the Teposcolula District in the center of the Mixteca Region.

== The town ==
The town is 2,300 meters above sea level. Long ago it was known as San Juan Itnuyana. The current town was founded in 1561. The main economic activities are logging and the production of mescal.

== The municipality ==
As of 2005, the municipality had 349 households with a total population of 1,344, of whom three spoke an indigenous language.

Teposcolula includes the following communities:

- Barrio de los Osorno,
- Cuadra el Hule,
- Cuadra Número Uno,
- Desviación Yucudaa,
- El Calvario,
- La Cieneguilla,
- La Garita,
- La Rosa,
- La Siempre Viva,
- Río Colorado (Rancho Yusadolo),
- Reforma,
- Refugio de Morelos,
- San Miguel Marcos Pérez,
- Santa María Pozoltepec,
- Satayuco
- Tierra Blanca
