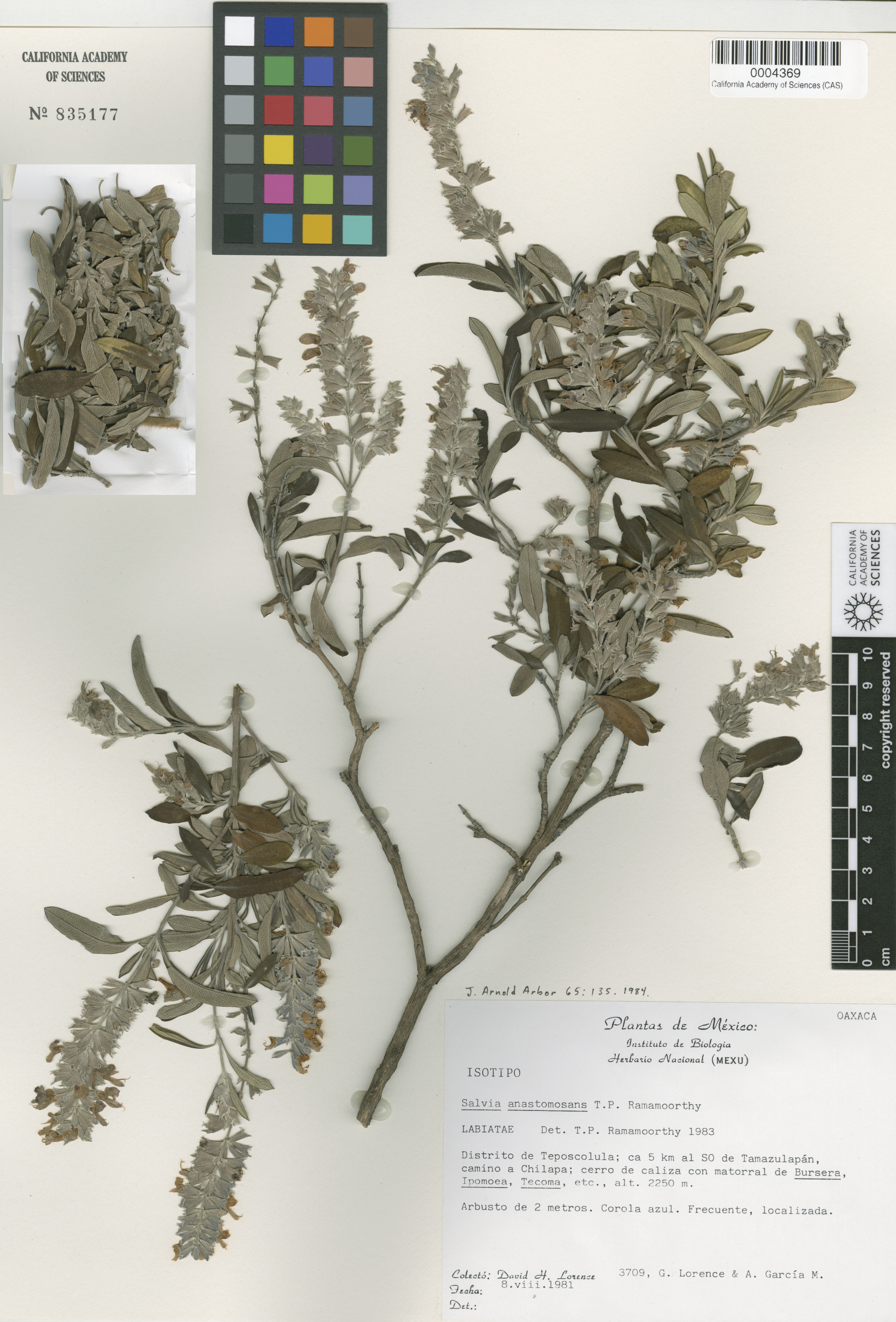

Scientific classification
- Kingdom: Plantae
- Clade: Tracheophytes
- Clade: Angiosperms
- Clade: Eudicots
- Clade: Asterids
- Order: Lamiales
- Family: Lamiaceae
- Genus: Salvia
- Species: S. anastomosans

Binomial name
- Salvia anastomosans Ramamoorthy

= Salvia anastomosans =

Species of flowering plant

Salvia anastomosans is a plant species native to the State of Oaxaca in southern Mexico. Type specimen was collected in Teposcolula District, near Tamazulapán at an elevation of approximately 2250 m (7500 feet).

Salvia anastomosans is a branching shrub up to 2 m (80 inches) tall. Much of the shoot is covered with small branching hairs. Leaf blades are narrowly oblong, up to 4 cm (1.6 inches) long. Flowers are borne in racemes in the axils of the leaves and at the tips of the branches, with the flowers in clumps at the nodes. The calyx appears white because of the dense covering of branched hairs. Corolla is blue. The species epithet "anastomosans" refers to the unusual anastamosing nature of the veins in the leaf, forming an interconnecting network rather than having each vein end abruptly without connecting with another.
