= San Antonino Monte Verde =

- Municipality and town
- Location in Mexico
- Coordinates: 17°31′56″N 97°43′15″W
- Country: Mexico
- State: Oaxaca

Area
  - Total: 178.62 km^{2} (68.97 sq mi)

Population (2005)
  - Total: 6,482
- Time zone: UTC-6 (Central Standard Time)

San Antonino Monte Verde is a town and municipality in Oaxaca in south-western Mexico. The municipality covers an area of 178.62 km^{2}. It is part of the Teposcolula District in the center of the Mixteca Region.

As of 2005, the municipality had a total population of 6,482.
