= Coixtlahuaca District =

- District
- Oaxaca regions and districts: Mixteca to Northwest
- Coordinates: 17°43′N 97°19′W
- Country: Mexico
- State: Oaxaca

Area
  - Total: 1,666 km^{2} (643 sq mi)

Population (2020)
  - Total: 9,250

Coixtlahuaca District is located in the northeast of the Mixteca Region of the State of Oaxaca, Mexico. As of 2005 the population was 9,018, down 2.8% from 2000.

The region is generally from 2,000m to 3,000m high, mostly hilly or mountainous with small plains. Temperatures range from 3°C to 36°C. Much of the area has been deforested and rainfall has decreased in recent years, affecting production of the standard crops of corn, wheat, beans and barley. It is the traditional home of the Chocho people, although they are now a small minority. The population has been shrinking due to emigration for economic reasons.

== Municipalities ==
Coixtlahuaca municipalities

The district includes the following municipalities:

Municipality code	Name	Population		Land Area			Population density	
Municipality code	Name	2020	Rank	km^{2}	sq mi	Rank	2020	Rank
018	Concepción Buenavista	752	4	224.6	86.7	3	3/km^{2} (9/sq mi)	12
129	San Cristóbal Suchixtlahuaca	356	7	53.09	20.50	7	7/km^{2} (17/sq mi)	7
151	San Francisco Teopan	312	9	86.27	33.31	5	4/km^{2} (9/sq mi)	10
176	San Juan Bautista Coixtlahuaca	2,725	1	286.1	110.5	2	10/km^{2} (25/sq mi)	2
256	San Mateo Tlapiltepec	229	11	24.41	9.42	12	9/km^{2} (24/sq mi)	4
283	San Miguel Tequixtepec	1,044	3	162.2	62.6	4	6/km^{2} (17/sq mi)	9
287	San Miguel Tulancingo	307	10	46.70	18.03	8	7/km^{2} (17/sq mi)	8
047	Santa Magdalena Jicotlán	81	13	26.77	10.34	11	3/km^{2} (8/sq mi)	13
422	Santa María Nativitas	603	5	43.09	16.64	10	14/km^{2} (36/sq mi)	1
464	Santiago Ihuitlán Plumas	341	8	46.17	17.83	9	7/km^{2} (19/sq mi)	6
488	Santiago Tepetlapa	130	12	13.58	5.24	13	10/km^{2} (25/sq mi)	3
548	Tepelmeme Villa de Morelos	1,960	2	574.2	221.7	1	3/km^{2} (9/sq mi)	11
552	Tlacotepec Plumas	410	6	55.87	21.57	5	7/km^{2} (19/sq mi)	4
	Distrito Coixtlahuaca	9,250	—	1,643	634.37	—	6/km^{2} (15/sq mi)	—
Source: INEGI

== See also ==
- Municipalities of Oaxaca
