= Localities of Mexico =

Localities (Spanish: Localidades) are the basic level of administrative divisions of Mexico that correspond to distinct settlements. In the Mexican administrative hierarchy, localities are under the municipalities and boroughs. As of December 2024, there are in total 296,814 localities under the 2,478 municipalities in Mexico.

== Administration ==
The Constitution of Mexico has defined Mexico a federal republic of 32 federative entities (31 states and Mexico City), it also outlines that the federative entities to be divided into municipalities (Spanish: municipios) and boroughs (Spanish: demarcaciones territoriales). The divisions of municipalities and boroughs are regulated solely by constitutions and laws of the respective federative entities.

Among the states, settlement classification schemes vary. Common types of localities include:

- City (Spanish: Ciudad) — for more populous places,
- Town (Spanish: Villa) — for middle populous places, and
- Village (Spanish: Pueblo or Poblado) — for less populous places.

Other classifications include ranchería, congregación (población), or ejido.

Mexico City further divides its boroughs into neighborhoods (Spanish: colonias).

The federal government has established the National Institute of Statistics and Geography (Spanish: Instituto Nacional de Estadística y Geografía, INEGI) to maintain the statistics and encoding of the administrative divisions across the country. The INEGI uses the term localities (Spanish: localidades) to collectively refer to these types of division. The INEGI's definition of localities is: "All places with one or more dwellings, who may be inhabited or not, and can be classed as urban or rural."

== Statistics ==
According to INEGI's data, there are in total 296,814 localities under the 2,478 municipalities in Mexico as of December 2024.

Federative entity		Municipalities and boroughs	Localities		
Code	Name	Municipalities and boroughs	Urban	Rural	Total
01	Aguascalientes	11	40	2,962	3,002
02	Baja California	7	44	7,703	7,747
03	Baja California Sur	5	16	4,148	4,164
04	Campeche	13	33	4,981	5,014
05	Coahuila	38	59	10,308	1,0367
06	Colima	10	21	2,885	2,906
07	Chiapas	124	206	27,372	27,578
08	Chihuahua	67	89	23,327	23,416
09	Mexico City	16	33	687	720
10	Durango	39	61	9,961	10,022
11	Guanajuato	46	175	10,947	11,122
12	Guerrero	85	151	9,195	9,346
13	Hidalgo	84	263	5,028	5,291
14	Jalisco	125	285	18,911	19,196
15	México	125	571	4,584	5,155
16	Michoacán	113	229	10,895	11,124
17	Morelos	36	95	1,763	1,858
18	Nayarit	20	55	4,743	4,798
19	Nuevo León	51	104	10,702	10,806
20	Oaxaca	570	612	12,520	13,132
21	Puebla	217	433	7,389	7,822
22	Querétaro	18	113	2,703	2,816
23	Quintana Roo	11	28	4,247	4,275
24	San Luis Potosí	59	83	8,823	8,906
25	Sinaloa	20	88	8,740	8,828
26	Sonora	72	104	16,250	16,354
27	Tabasco	17	104	2,598	2,702
28	Tamaulipas	43	63	13,920	13,983
29	Tlaxcala	60	137	1,610	1,747
30	Veracruz	212	390	26,193	26,583
31	Yucatán	106	133	9,757	9,890
32	Zacatecas	58	86	6,058	6,144
Total		2,478	4,904	291,910	296,814

== City ==
Cities (Spanish: Ciudades) are usually the most populous localities within the state. Each city elects its own city mayor (Spanish: alcalde de la ciudad). Note that the term city mayor should not be confused with municipal president (Spanish: presidente municipal), leader of a municipality, the city's upper-level division.

Some larger cities are consolidated with its own municipality and form a single level of governance. Some of these cities are further divided into boroughs (Spanish: delegaciones) or neighborhoods (Spanish: colonias) in locality level.

== See also ==
- Administrative divisions of Mexico
- Settlement classification in Mexico
