= San Pedro y San Pablo =

San Pedro y San Pablo is Spanish for Saint Paul and Saint Peter. It may refer to:

== Churches ==
- Iglesia Mayor de San Pedro y San Pablo, San Fernando, Cádiz, Andalusia, Spain
- San Pedro y San Pablo Asistencia, Pacifica, California
- Mission San Pedro y San Pablo de Bicuñer, near Yuma, Arizona
- Mission San Pedro y San Pablo del Tubutama, Tubutama, Sonora, Mexico
- San Pedro y San Pablo de Patale, Leon County, Florida

== Places ==
Mexico

- San Pedro y San Pablo Ayutla, Oaxaca
- San Pedro y San Pablo Teposcolula, Oaxaca
- San Pedro y San Pablo Tequixtepec, Oaxaca

== Other uses ==
- San Pedro y San Pablo College, Mexico City
- San Pedro y San Pablo River, river in Mexico
