= San Pedro Mártir =

San Pedro Mártir (a reference to the martyrdom of St. Peter) may refer to:

- Sierra San Pedro Mártir, a mountain range on Mexico's Baja California Peninsula, part of which is:
  - Parque Nacional Sierra de San Pedro Mártir, a national park
- San Pedro Mártir, Oaxaca, a town in the Mexican state of Oaxaca
- San Pedro Mártir Quiechapa, a town in the Mexican state of Oaxaca
- San Pedro Mártir Yucuxaco, a town in the Mexican state of Oaxaca
- San Pedro Mártir Island, Gulf of California, Mexico
- Misión San Pedro Mártir de Verona
