= San Pedro y San Pablo Teposcolula =

- Municipality and town
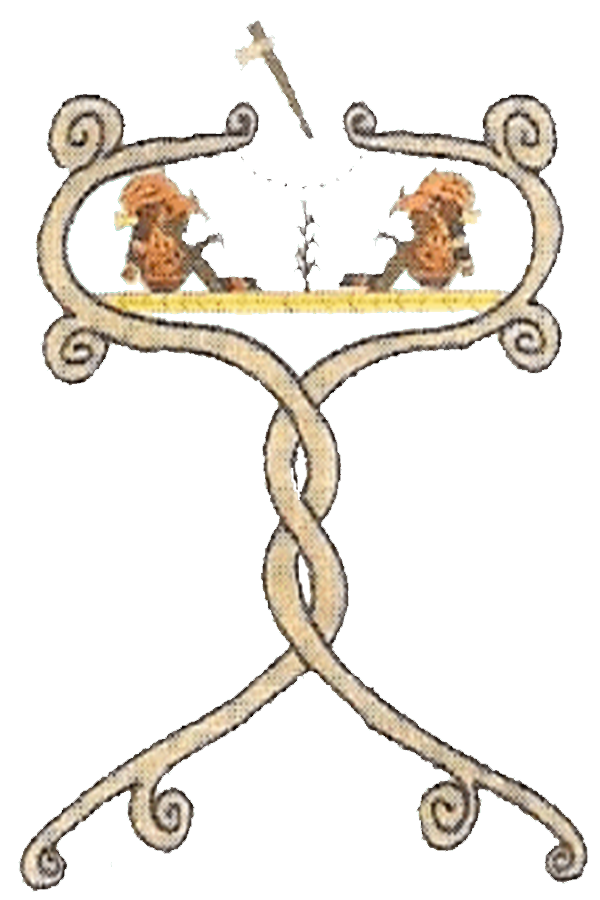
- Coat of arms

- Location in Mexico
- Coordinates: 17°31′N 97°29′W
- Country: Mexico
- State: Oaxaca
- Time zone: UTC-6 (Central Standard Time)

San Pedro y San Pablo Teposcolula is a town and municipality in Oaxaca in south-western Mexico. The municipality covers an area of km^{2}. It is part of the Teposcolula District in the center of the Mixteca Region.

As of 2005, the municipality had a total population of .
