= Settlement classification in Mexico =

Mexico's states classify their settlements in a variety of fashions:

== Aguascalientes ==
Under Article 106 of the Municipal Law of the State of Aguascalientes, the state defines its settlements as follows:

- Ciudad (city): Census population in excess of 15,000 inhabitants.
- Villa (town): Census population of over 1,000.
- Poblado (village): Census population of between 500 and 1,000.
- Ranchería (hamlet): All other settlements.

== Baja California Sur ==
According to Article 10 of the Organic Municipal Law of the State of Baja California Sur, the state classifies its settlements as follows:

- Ciudad (city): A settlement with more than 12,000 inhabitants, or a municipal seat irrespective of population.
- Villa (town): More than 5,000 inhabitants.
- Pueblo (village): More than 2,000 inhabitants.
- Congregación (congregation): More than 200 inhabitants.
- Ranchería (hamlet): Fewer than 200 inhabitants.

== Campeche ==
According to Article 12 of the Organic Municipalities Law of the State of Campeche, the state classifies its settlements as follows:

- Ciudad (city): A settlement with at least 5,000 inhabitants.
- Villa (town): At least 2,000 inhabitants.
- Pueblo (village): At least 1,000 inhabitants.
- Congregación (congregation): Fewer than 1,000 inhabitants, but with facilities for a rural school and municipal offices.

== Chiapas ==
According to the Law on the Political and Administrative Classification of Population Centres in the State of Chiapas, the state classifies its settlements as follows:

- Ciudades (cities): At least 10,000 inhabitants, and adequate urban infrastructure.
- Villas (towns): At least 5,000 inhabitants.
- Pueblos (villages): At least 2,500 inhabitants
- Rancherías, colonias, parajes, cantones and riberas (hamlets and neighbourhoods): At least 300 inhabitants.

To serve as a municipal seat, a settlement must be either a city or town. The granting of all settlement statuses is a function of the State Congress.

== Chihuahua ==
According to Article 13 bis of the Municipal Code of the State of Chihuahua, the state classifies its settlements as follows:

- Ciudad (city): More than 8000 inhabitants.
- Poblado (town): More than 2500 inhabitants.
- Comunidad (community): More than 500 inhabitants.
- Ranchería (hamlet): More than 100 inhabitants.

== Coahuila ==
According to Article 22 of the Municipal Code for the State of Coahuila de Zaragoza, the state classifies its settlements as follows:

- Ciudad (city): More than 20,000 inhabitants, or a municipal seat irrespective of size.
- Villa (town): More than 7,000 inhabitants.
- Pueblo (village): More than 2,500 inhabitants.
- Ranchería (hamlet): More than 1,000 inhabitants.
- Caserío (rural hamlet): Up to 1,000 inhabitants, in rural areas.

== Colima ==
According to Article 13 of the Organic Law of Free Municipalities of the State of Colima, the state classifies its settlements as follows:

- Ciudad (city): Census population in excess of 10,000 inhabitants.
- Pueblo (town): Census population in excess of 2,000 inhabitants.
- Ranchería (village): All other settlements.

== Durango ==
According to Article 6 of the Organic Law of the Free Municipality of the State of Durango, the state categorises its settlements as follows:

- Ciudad (city): At least 6,000 inhabitants.
- Villa (town): At least 4,000 inhabitants.
- Pueblo (village): At least 1,000 inhabitants.

== Guanajuato ==
According to Article 23 of the Organic Municipal Law of the State of Guanajuato, the state classifies its settlements as follows:

- Ciudad (city): At least 20,000 inhabitants.
- Villa (town): At least 7,000 inhabitants.
- Pueblo (village): At least 2,500 inhabitants.
- Ranchería (hamlet): At least 500 inhabitants.
- Caserío (rural hamlet): Less than 500 inhabitants, in rural areas.

== Guerrero ==
According to Article 1 of the Law number 59, territorial division of the state Guerrero, the state classifies its settlements as follows:

- Ciudad (city): At least 5,000 inhabitants.
- Pueblo (village): between 500 and 4,999 inhabitants.
- Cuadrilla (hamlet): between 100 and 499 inhabitants.
- Ranchería (rural hamlet): between 50 and 99 inhabitants.

== Hidalgo ==
According to Article 20 of the Organic Municipal Law of the State of Hidalgo, the state classifies its settlements as follows:

- Ciudad (city): More than 25,000 inhabitants.
- Villa (town): More than 10,000 inhabitants.
- Pueblo (village): More than 5,000 inhabitants.
- Comunidad (community) or congregación (congregation): More than 500 inhabitants.
- Ranchería (hamlet): Fewer than 500 inhabitants.

== Jalisco ==
According to Chapter II of the Organic Municipal Law of the State of Jalisco, the state classifies its settlements as follows:

- Ciudad (city): At least 50,000 inhabitants.
- Delegación municipal (municipal borough): At least 2,500 inhabitants.
- Poblado (town): All others.

== Estado de México ==
According to Article 9 of the Organic Municipal Law of the State of Mexico, the state classifies its settlements as follows:

- Ciudad (city): More than 15,000 inhabitants.
- Villa (town): Between 5,000 and 15,000 inhabitants.
- Pueblo (village): Between 1,000 and 5,000 inhabitants.
- Ranchería (hamlet): Between 500 and 1,000 inhabitants.
- Caserío (small hamlet): Fewer than 500 inhabitants.

Elevating a settlement to a city status is a function of the State Congress. The lower statuses can be granted by municipal authorities.

== Michoacán ==
According to Article 1 of the Organic Law of the Territorial Division of Michoacán, the state classifies its settlements as follows:

- Distrito (district): Number of inhabitants not specified.
- Municipalidad (municipality): Number of inhabitants not specified.
- Tenencia (tenure or holding): Number of inhabitants not specified.
- Otras (others): Hacienda, Rancho, Ranchería, and Colonia.

== Morelos ==
According to Article 23 of the Organic Municipal Law of the State of Morelos, the state classifies its settlements as follows:

- Ciudad (city): More than 25,000 inhabitants, and appropriate urban infrastructure.
- Villa (town): More than 15,000 inhabitants, and appropriate urban infrastructure.
- Pueblo (village): More than 7,000 inhabitants, and appropriate urban infrastructure.
- Ranchería (hamlet): More than 3,000 inhabitants, and appropriate urban infrastructure.
- Congregación (congregation): Fewer than 3,000 inhabitants.

== Nayarit ==
Under the Law of Political Categories for Settlements in the State of Nayarit, the state classifies its settlements as follows:

- Ciudad (city): At least 3,000 inhabitants, of whom 75% are active in commerce, industry, or professions or trades.
- Villa (town): At least 1,500 inhabitants, of whom 50% are active in commerce, industry, or professions or trades.
- Pueblo (village): At least 700 inhabitants, of whom at least 10% are active in commerce, industry, or professions or trades.
- Congregación (congregation): At least 300 inhabitants
- Ranchería (hamlet): At least 90 inhabitants.
- Hacienda (estate): Number irrelevant, homes tied to an estate.
- Rancho (homestead): All others.

== Oaxaca ==
According to the Municipal Law of the State of Oaxaca, the state classifies its settlements as follows:

- Ciudad (city): at least 20,000 inhabitants.
- Villa (town): at least 18,000 inhabitants.
- Pueblo (village): at least 15,000 inhabitants.
- Ranchería (hamlet): at least 10,000 inhabitants.
- Congregación (small hamlet): a permanent rural or ejidal settlement of at least 5,000 people engaged in agriculture.
- Nucleo rural (rural community): at least 500 inhabitants.

== Puebla ==
According to the Organic Municipal Law of the State of Puebla, the state classifies its settlements in terms of their populations and their provision of certain basic public services (schools, clinics, abattoirs, graveyards, etc.):

- Ciudad (city): Census population of at least 20,000.
- Villa (town): Census population of at least 10,000.
- Pueblo (village): Census population of at least 2,500.
- Ranchería (hamlet): Census population of at least 500, and at least 5 km from the nearest city, town or village.
- Comunidad (community): Up to 500 inhabitants, and at least 5 km from the nearest larger settlement.
- Barrio (neighbourhood): Collection of houses structured as blocks (manzanas) that may be part of a town, village, hamlet, or community.
- Sección (section): Collection of blocks, neighbourhoods, colonias, communities, or hamlets that individually or collectively total more than 1,000 inhabitants.

Under Art. 7 of the law, municipal seats may not have a classification lower than that of a town (villa).

== Querétaro ==
According to the Organic Municipal Law of the State of Querétaro, the state classifies its settlements in terms of their populations and their provision of certain basic public services (schools, clinics, abattoirs, graveyards, etc.):

- Ciudad (city): Census population of at least 30,000, or a municipal seat irrespective of size.
- Villa (town): Census population of at least 7,000.
- Pueblo (village): Census population of at least 2,000.
- Ranchería (hamlet): Census population of at least 500.
- Caserío (rural community): Rural settlement of up to 500 inhabitants.

== Quintana Roo ==
According to the Organic Municipal Law of the Free and Sovereign State of Quintana Roo, the state classifies its settlements as follows:

- Ciudad (city): more than 10,000 inhabitants, or a municipal seat irrespective of size.
- Villa (town): more than 5,000 inhabitants.
- Pueblo (village): more than 2,000 inhabitants.
- Ranchería (hamlet): more than 500 inhabitants.
- Congregación (small hamlet): fewer than 500 inhabitants

== San Luis Potosí ==
According to article 9 of the Organic Municipal Law of the Free and Sovereign State of San Luis Potosí, the state classifies its settlements as follows:

- Ciudad (city): more than 20,000 inhabitants, wherein certain medical and police services are available and infrastructure is in place.
- Villa (town): more than 6,500 inhabitants, wherein certain medical and police services are available and infrastructure is in place.
- Pueblo (village): more than 1,000 inhabitants, with certain basic services.
- Ranchería (hamlet): fewer than 1,000 inhabitants.

== Sinaloa ==
According to article 12 of the Organic Municipal Law of the Free and Sovereign State of Sinaloa, the state classifies its settlements as follows:

- Ciudad (city): more than 25,000 inhabitants, or a municipal seat regardless of population.
- Villa (town): more than 5,000 inhabitants, or a sindicate seat regardless of population.
- Pueblo (village): more than 2,000 inhabitants, or a comissarate seat regardless of population.
- Rancho (hamlet): fewer than 2,000 inhabitants.

== Tabasco ==
According to article 9 of the Organic Municipal Law of the State of Tabasco, the state classifies its settlements in terms of their population and their provision of certain basic public services:

- Ciudad (city): At least 7,500 inhabitants.
- Villa (town): At least 5,000 inhabitants.
- Pueblo (village): At least 2,500 inhabitants.
- Ranchería (hamlet): At least 1,000 inhabitants.

== Tamaulipas ==
According to Article 13 of the Municipal Code for the State of Tamaulipas, the state classifies its settlements as follows:

- Ciudad (city): At least 25,000 inhabitants.
- Villa (town): At least 5,000 inhabitants.
- Congregación o Poblado (village): At least 1,000 inhabitants.
- Ranchería (large hamlet): up to 1,000 inhabitants.

== Tlaxcala ==
According to the Organic Municipal Law of the State of Tlaxcala, the state classifies its settlements in terms of their population and their provision of certain basic public services:

- Ciudad (city): At least 20,000 inhabitants.
- Villa (town): At least 10,000 inhabitants.
- Pueblo (village): At least 1,000 inhabitants.
- Colonia (neighbourhood): At least 300 inhabitants.
- Ranchería (hamlet): Fewer than 300 inhabitants.

== Veracruz ==
According to Article 11 of the Organic Law of the Free Municipality of the State of Veracruz, the state categorises its settlements as follows:

- Ciudad (city): 30000+ inhabitants
- Villa (town): 10000+
- Pueblo (village): 5000+
- Ranchería (large hamlet): 500–2000
- Caserío (small hamlet): up to 500

== Yucatán ==
According to Article 12 of the Government Law of the Municipality of the State of Yucatán, the state categorises its settlements as follows:

- Ciudad (city): 15,000+ inhabitants
- Villa (town): 8,000+
- Pueblo (village): 3,000+
- Comisaría (commissariat): 500+
- Subcomisaría (sub-commissariat): up to 500

== Zacatecas ==
According to Article 25 of the Organic Law of the Municipality of the State of Zacatecas, the state categorises its settlements as follows:

- Ciudad (city): 15,000+ inhabitants
- Pueblo (town): 2,500+
- Localidad rural (rural community): up to 500

== See also ==
- Localities of Mexico
