= Teposcolula District =

- District
- Oaxaca regions and districts: Mixteca to Northwest
- Coordinates: 17°33′N 97°25′W
- Country: Mexico
- State: Oaxaca

Population (2020)
  - Total: 35,027

Teposcolula District is located in the center of the Mixteca Region of the State of Oaxaca, Mexico.

== Municipalities ==
Teposcolula municipalities

The district includes the following municipalities:

Municipality code	Name	Population		Land Area			Population density	
Municipality code	Name	2020	Rank	km^{2}	sq mi	Rank	2020	Rank
556	La Trinidad Vista Hermosa	306	16	10.81	4.17	21	28/km^{2} (73/sq mi)	5
093	San Andrés Lagunas	518	12	50.02	19.31	12	10/km^{2} (27/sq mi)	13
105	San Antonino Monte Verde	7,678	2	109.7	42.4	5	70/km^{2} (181/sq mi)	1
106	San Antonio Acutla	249	18	16.48	6.36	19	15/km^{2} (39/sq mi)	10
055	San Bartolo Soyaltepec	596	11	74.92	28.93	9	8/km^{2} (21/sq mi)	17
221	San Juan Teposcolula	1,494	8	87.01	33.59	7	17/km^{2} (44/sq mi)	9
321	San Pedro Nopala	751	10	109.6	42.3	6	7/km^{2} (18/sq mi)	19
332	San Pedro Topiltepec	373	15	32.82	12.67	15	11/km^{2} (29/sq mi)	11
339	San Pedro y San Pablo Teposcolula	4,353	3	178.8	69.0	1	24/km^{2} (63/sq mi)	6
341	San Pedro Yucunama	241	19	29.82	11.51	16	8/km^{2} (21/sq mi)	18
346	San Sebastián Nicananduta	1,542	7	44.07	17.02	14	34/km^{2} (89/sq mi)	3
536	San Vicente Nuñú	449	14	71.38	27.56	10	6/km^{2} (16/sq mi)	20
423	Santa María Nduayaco	453	13	76.82	29.66	8	6/km^{2} (15/sq mi)	21
479	Santiago Nejapilla	174	20	20.45	7.90	18	9/km^{2} (22/sq mi)	16
499	Santiago Yolomécatl	1,922	5	66.92	25.84	11	29/km^{2} (74/sq mi)	4
518	Santo Domingo Tlatayapam	113	21	11.82	4.56	20	10/km^{2} (25/sq mi)	14
521	Santo Domingo Tonaltepec	250	17	26.53	10.24	17	9/km^{2} (24/sq mi)	15
547	Teotongo	1,005	9	45.81	17.69	13	22/km^{2} (57/sq mi)	7
405	Villa de Chilapa de Diaz	1,815	6	174.9	67.5	2	10/km^{2} (27/sq mi)	12
540	Villa de Tamazulapam del Progreso	8,326	1	143.9	55.6	3	58/km^{2} (150/sq mi)	2
486	Villa Tejupam de la Unión	2,419	4	141.5	54.6	4	17/km^{2} (44/sq mi)	8
	Distrito Teposcolula	35,027	—	1,524.08	588.45	—	23/km^{2} (60/sq mi)	—
Source: INEGI

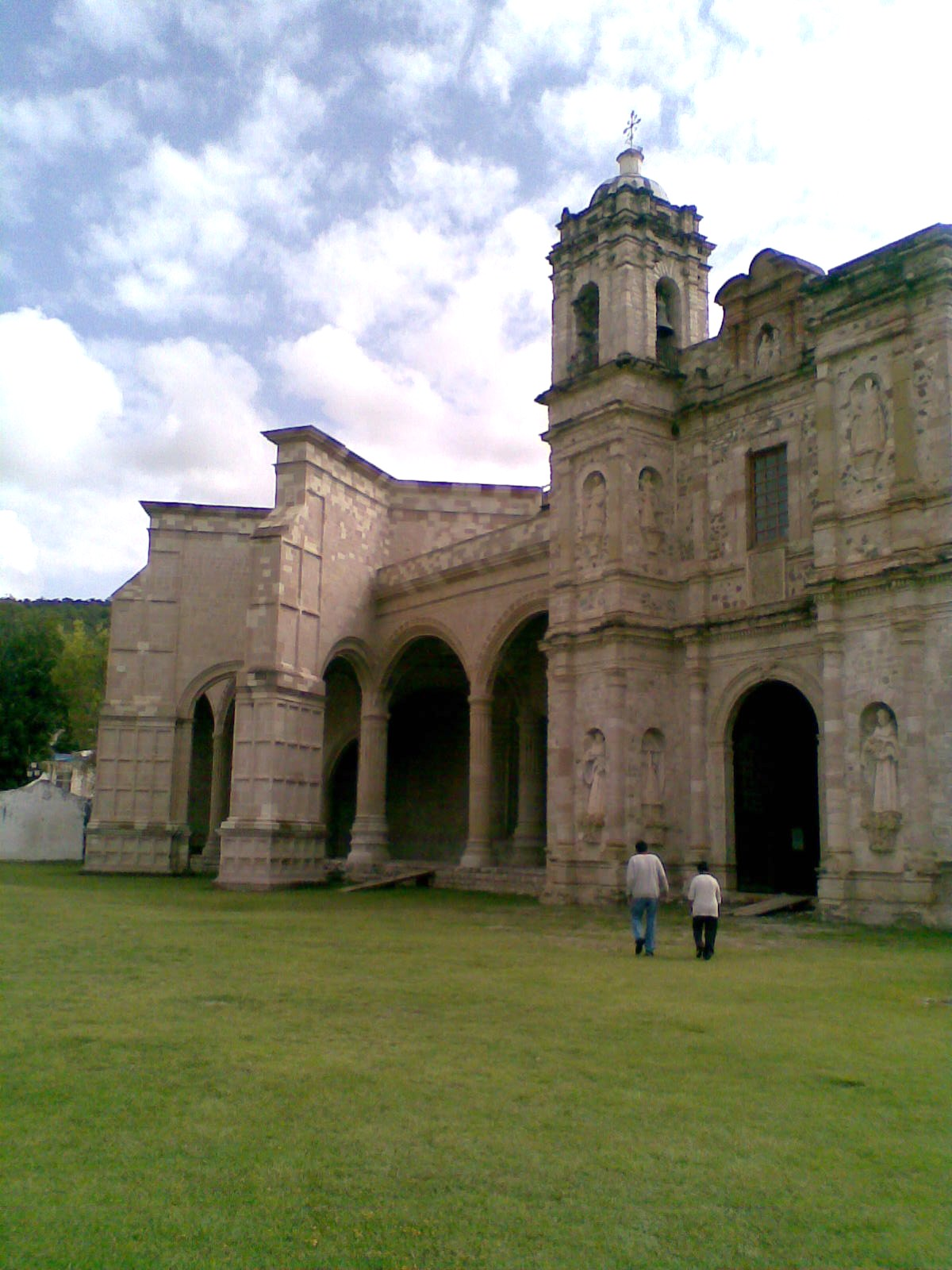
The Convent of San Pedro y San Pablo
