= Santiago Tepetlapa =

- Municipality and town
- Location in Mexico
- Coordinates: 17°46′55″N 97°24′03″W
- Country: Mexico
- State: Oaxaca

Government
- Elevation: 2,172 m (7,126 ft)

Population (2010)
  - Municipality and town: 131
  - Urban: 101
- Time zone: UTC-6 (Central Standard Time)

Santiago Tepetlapa is a town and municipality in Oaxaca, in southeastern Mexico. The municipality has an area of 13.624 km^{2} and is part of the Coixtlahuaca district in the Mixteca Region.

== Demography ==
As of the 2010 census, the town (locality) had a population of 101 inhabitants, while the municipality had a total population of 131 inhabitants. It is the second-smallest municipality in Mexico in population, larger than only Santa Magdalena Jicotlán, also in Oaxaca.
