= Santa Magdalena Jicotlán =

- Municipality and town
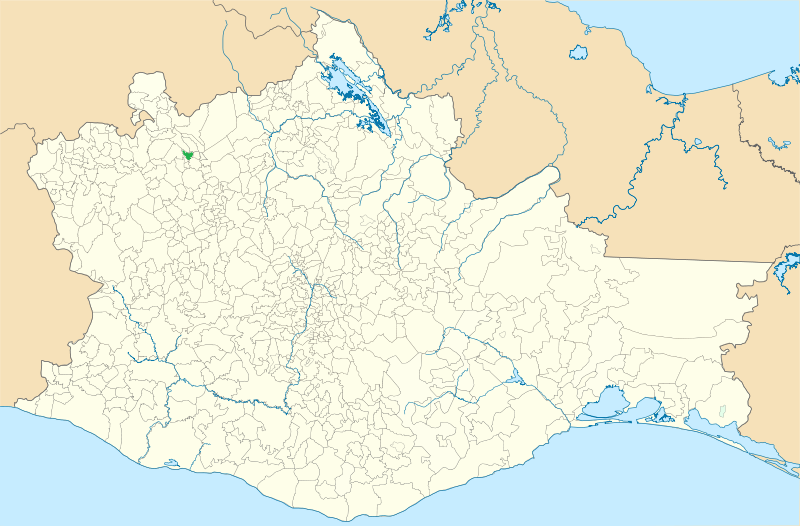
- Location of the municipality in Oaxaca

- Location in Mexico
- Coordinates: 17°48′24″N 97°28′16″W
- Country: Mexico
- State: Oaxaca

Area
  - Municipality and town: 48.48 km^{2} (18.72 sq mi)
- Elevation: 2,179 m (7,149 ft)

Population (2010)
  - Municipality and town: 93
  - Urban: 92
- Time zone: UTC−6 (Central (US Central))

Santa Magdalena Jicotlán is a town and municipality in Oaxaca in southeastern Mexico and is the least populous municipality in Oaxaca. It is also the third least densely populated municipality in Oaxaca, not being as sparsely populated as Santa María Ixcatlán or Santa María Chimalapa. It is part of the Coixtlahuaca district in the Mixteca Region. The municipality covers an area of 48.48 km^{2}, surrounded by the Sierra Madre Oriental. As of the 2010 census, the town (locality) had a population of 92 inhabitants, while the municipality had a total population of 93 (officially, there was one rural resident in a place called Barrio San Miguel). It is the smallest municipality in Mexico in population. (The next-smallest is Santiago Tepetlapa, also in Oaxaca.) The main economic activity is agriculture, with some people also keeping goats and chickens.

The town has a Catholic church dedicated to Mary Magdalene, built in the mid eighteenth century with baroque influences. It has a kindergarten and an elementary school, each with one teacher.
