= Municipalities of Mexico =

Second-level administrative divisions of Mexico

Municipality Municipio (Spanish)
- Municipalities of Mexico as of January 2020
- Category: Municipio / Municipality
- Location: Mexico
- Found in: Mexican states
- Number: 2,462 (as of December 2024)
- Populations: Smallest: 81 (Santa Magdalena Jicotlán, Oax.); Largest: 1,922,523 (Tijuana, B.C.)
- Areas: Smallest: 2.2 km^{2} (0.85 sq mi) (Natividad, Oax.); Largest: 32,953.3 km^{2} (12,723.3 sq mi) (Mulegé, B.C.S.)
- Government: Municipal council (Ayuntamiento)
- Subdivisions: Localities

Municipalities (Spanish: Municipios) are the administrative divisions under the states of Mexico according to the constitution. Municipalities are considered as the second-level administrative divisions by the federal government. However, some state regulations have designed intrastate regions to administer their own municipalities. Municipalities are further divided into localities in the structural hierarchy of administrative divisions of Mexico. As of December 2024, there are 2,462 municipalities in Mexico.

In Mexico, municipalities should not be confused with cities (Spanish: ciudades). Cities are locality-level divisions that are administered by the municipality, although some larger cities are consolidated with its own municipality and form a single level of governance. In addition, the 16 boroughs of Mexico City are considered municipality equivalent, this makes the total number of municipality-level divisions to be 2,478.

The internal political organization and their responsibilities are outlined in the 115th article of the 1917 Constitution and detailed in the constitutions of the states to which they belong. Municipalities are distinct from cities, a form of Mexican locality, and are divided into colonias (neighborhoods); some municipalities can be as large as full states, while cities can be measured in basic geostatistical areas or city blocks.

== Structure ==
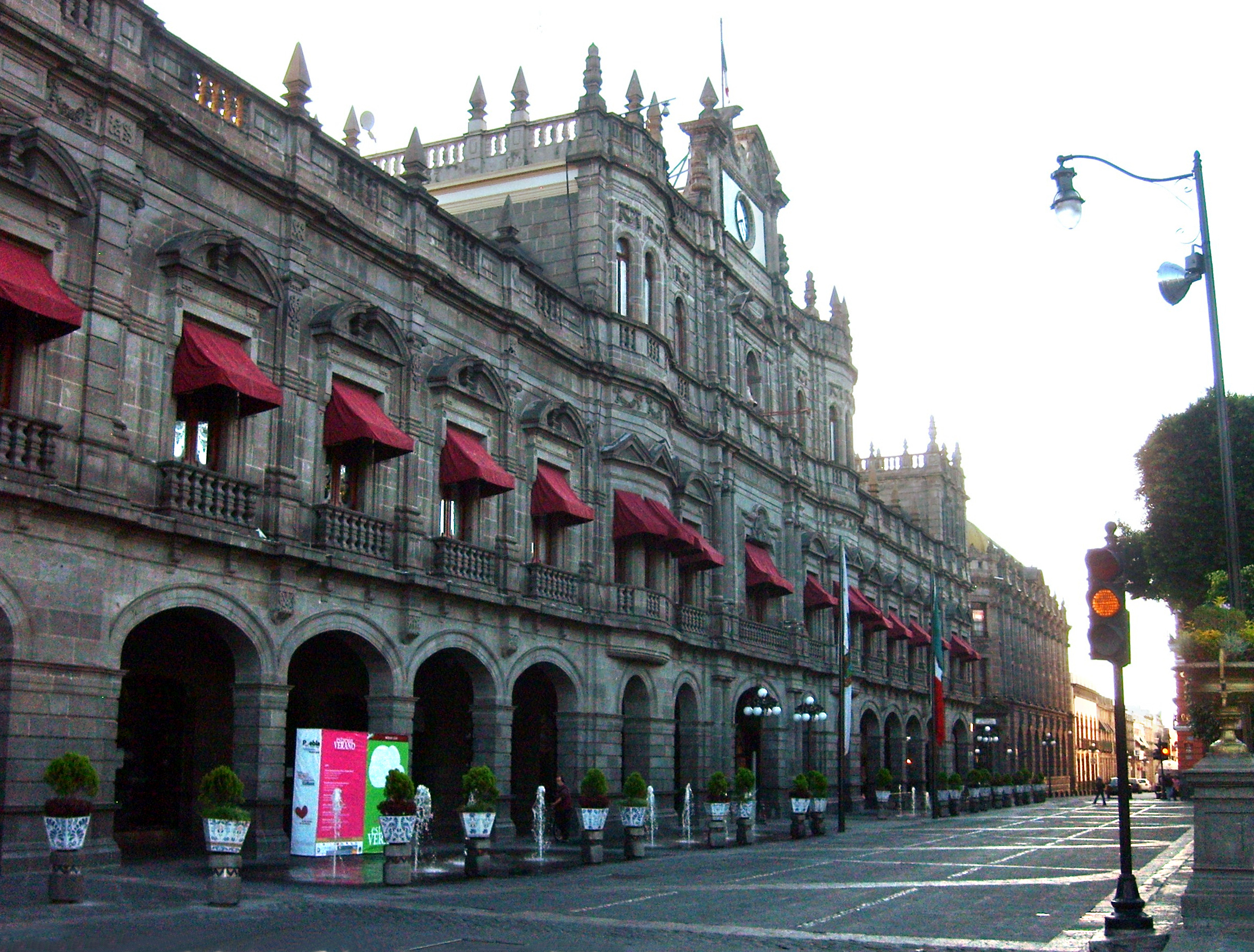
Puebla City Hall

All Mexican states are divided into municipalities. Each municipality is autonomous; citizens elect a municipal president (Spanish: presidente municipal) who heads a municipal council (Spanish: ayuntamiento), responsible for providing all the public services for their constituents. This concept, which originated after the Mexican Revolution, is known as a municipio libre (free municipality).

The municipal president is elected by first-past-the-post voting system for a three-year term and cannot be reelected for the next immediate term. The municipal council consists of a cabildo (chairman) with a síndico and several regidores (trustees).

If the municipality covers a large area and contains more than one city or town (collectively called localidades), one city or town is selected as a cabecera municipal (head city, seat of the municipal government) while the rest elect representatives to a presidencia auxiliar or junta auxiliar (auxiliary presidency or council). In that sense, a municipality in Mexico is roughly equivalent to the counties of the United States, whereas the auxiliary presidency is equivalent to a township. Nonetheless, auxiliary presidencies are not considered a third-level administrative division since they depend fiscally on the municipalities in which they are located.

North-western and south-eastern states are divided into small numbers of large municipalities (e.g. Baja California is divided into only seven municipalities), and therefore they cover large areas incorporating several separated cities or towns that do not necessarily conform to one single conurbation. Central and southern states, on the other hand, are divided into many small municipalities (e.g. Oaxaca is divided into 570 municipalities), and therefore large urban areas usually extend over several municipalities which form one single conurbation. Although an urban area might cover an entire municipality, auxiliary councils might still be used for administrative purposes.

Municipalities are responsible for public services (such as water and sewerage), street lighting, public safety, traffic, supervision of slaughterhouses and the cleaning and maintenance of public parks, gardens and cemeteries. They may also assist the state and federal governments in education, emergency fire and medical services, environmental protection and maintenance of monuments and historical landmarks. Since 1983, they can collect property taxes and user fees, although more funds are obtained from the state and federal governments than from their own collection efforts.

Some municipalities in Mexico are subdivided into internal, third-level administrative organizations. All municipalities of Baja California are subdivided into boroughs, or delegaciones. Mexicali municipality, for example, is divided into 14 boroughs besides the City of Mexicali, which comprises the municipal seat and three additional metropolitan boroughs. Querétaro municipality is subdivided into seven boroughs. Nonetheless, the heads of government of the boroughs are not elected by the residents but rather appointed by the municipal president.

Mexico City is a special case in that it is not organized into municipalities. As a result of the Political Reforms enacted in 2016, it is no longer designated as a Federal District and became a city, a member entity of the Mexican federation, seat of the Powers of the Union and the capital of Mexico. Mexico City is divided in 16 boroughs, officially called demarcaciones territoriales, substituting the old delegaciones. The boroughs are considered as third-level territorial divisions for statistical data collection and cross-country comparisons.

== Statistics ==
According to Mexico's National Institute of Statistics and Geography, there are in total 2,462 municipalities under the 31 states of Mexico as of December 2024. Consider also the 16 boroughs of Mexico City, the total number of municipality-level divisions to be 2,479.

Code	State	Municipalities	Main
01	Aguascalientes	12	Municipalities of Aguascalientes
02	Baja California	7	Municipalities of Baja California
03	Baja California Sur	5	Municipalities of Baja California Sur
04	Campeche	13	Municipalities of Campeche
05	Coahuila	38	Municipalities of Coahuila
06	Colima	10	Municipalities of Colima
07	Chiapas	124	Municipalities of Chiapas
08	Chihuahua	67	Municipalities of Chihuahua
10	Durango	39	Municipalities of Durango
11	Guanajuato	46	Municipalities of Guanajuato
12	Guerrero	85	Municipalities of Guerrero
13	Hidalgo	84	Municipalities of Hidalgo
14	Jalisco	125	Municipalities of Jalisco
15	México	125	Municipalities of the State of Mexico
16	Michoacán	113	Municipalities of Michoacán
17	Morelos	36	Municipalities of Morelos
18	Nayarit	20	Municipalities of Nayarit
19	Nuevo León	51	Municipalities of Nuevo León
20	Oaxaca	570	Municipalities of Oaxaca
21	Puebla	217	Municipalities of Puebla
22	Querétaro	18	Municipalities of Querétaro
23	Quintana Roo	11	Municipalities of Quintana Roo
24	San Luis Potosí	59	Municipalities of San Luis Potosí
25	Sinaloa	20	Municipalities of Sinaloa
26	Sonora	72	Municipalities of Sonora
27	Tabasco	17	Municipalities of Tabasco
28	Tamaulipas	43	Municipalities of Tamaulipas
29	Tlaxcala	60	Municipalities of Tlaxcala
30	Veracruz	212	Municipalities of Veracruz
31	Yucatán	106	Municipalities of Yucatán
32	Zacatecas	58	Municipalities of Zacatecas

== History ==
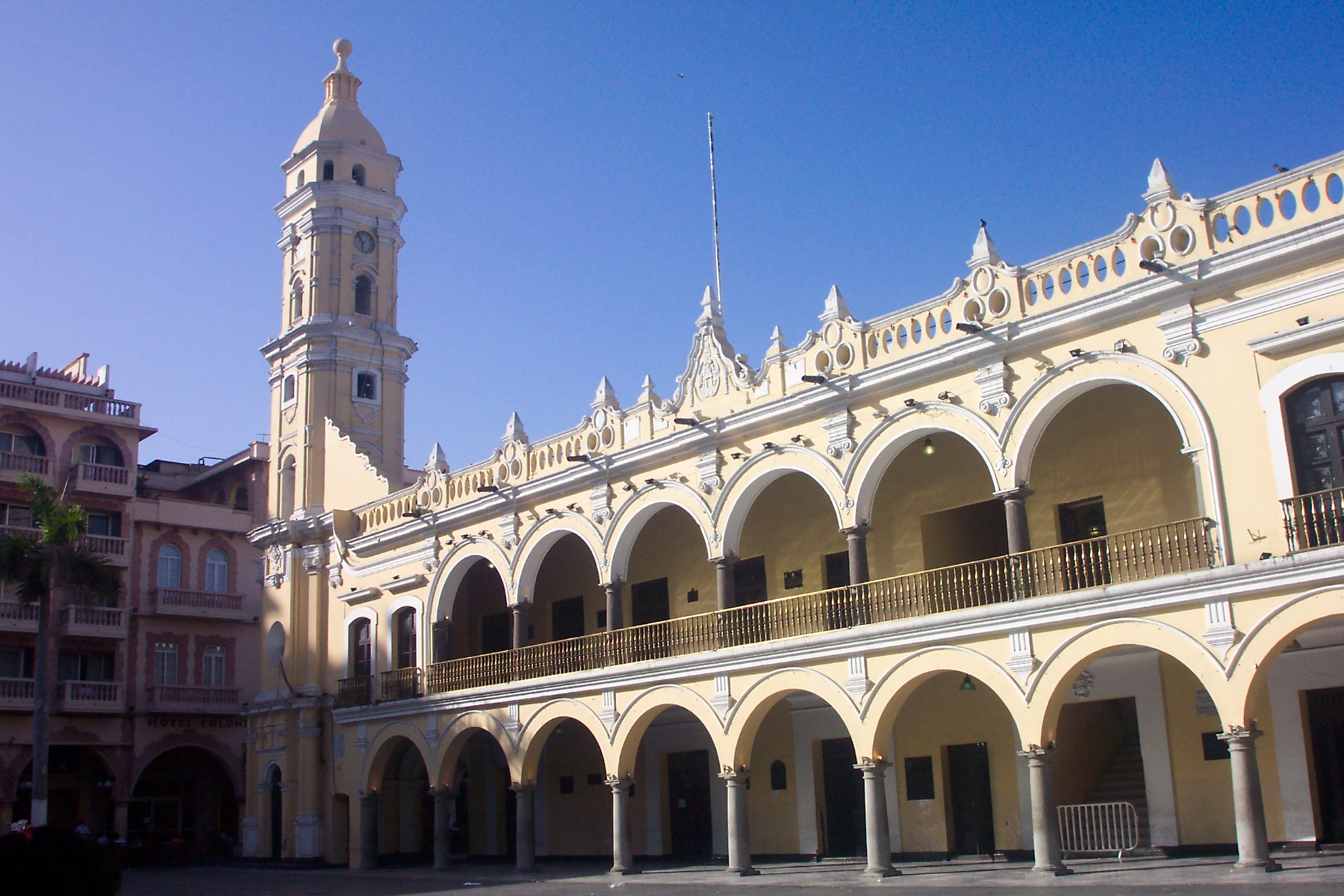
Veracruz City Hall

Since the Conquest and colonization of Mexico, the municipality became the basic entity of the administrative organization of New Spain and the Spanish Empire. The first city council in Mexico was established by Hernán Cortés in 1519 in Veracruz; it was also the first in the American mainland. Settlements located in strategic locations received the status of ciudad (the highest status within the Empire, superior to that of villas and pueblos) and were entitled to form an ayuntamiento or municipality. During the first decades, the local authorities had full powers on the public and economic administration of each municipality, but successive reforms diminished their attributions.

After Independence, the 1824 Constitution did not specify any regulation for the municipalities, whose structure and responsibilities were to be outlined in the constitution of each state of the federation. As such, every state set its own requirements for a settlement to become a municipality (usually based on population).

The Constitution of 1917 abolished the jefatura política ("political authority"), the intermediate administrative authority between the states and converted all existing municipalities into municipios libres ("free municipalities"), that is, gave them full autonomy to manage local affairs, while at the same time restricting the scope of their competencies. However, in 1983 the 115th article was modified to expand the municipalities' authority to raise revenue (through property taxes and other local services) and to formulate budgets.

Since the 2015 Intercensal Survey, the following municipalities have been created by the state governments.

- January 6, 2016: Puerto Morelos in Quintana Roo
- September 6, 2017: Capitán Luis Ángel Vidal and Rincón Chamula San Pedro in Chiapas.
- July 15, 2018: Honduras de la Sierra in Chiapas.
- January 1, 2019: Coatetelco, Hueyapan, and Xoxocotla in Morelos.
- February 27, 2020: San Quintín in Baja California.
- January 1, 2021: Seybaplaya and Dzitbalché in Campeche.
- March 5, 2021: Eldorado and Juan José Ríos in Sinaloa.
- August 31, 2021: Las Vigas, Ñuu Savi, San Nicolás, and Santa Cruz del Rincón in Guerrero.
- January 1, 2022: San Felipe in Baja California.
- July 22, 2024: Villa de Pozos in San Luis Potosí.
- August 28, 2026: Villa Juárez in Aguascalientes.

== Ranking of municipalities ==
=== By population ===
Data from the 2020 Mexican National Census.

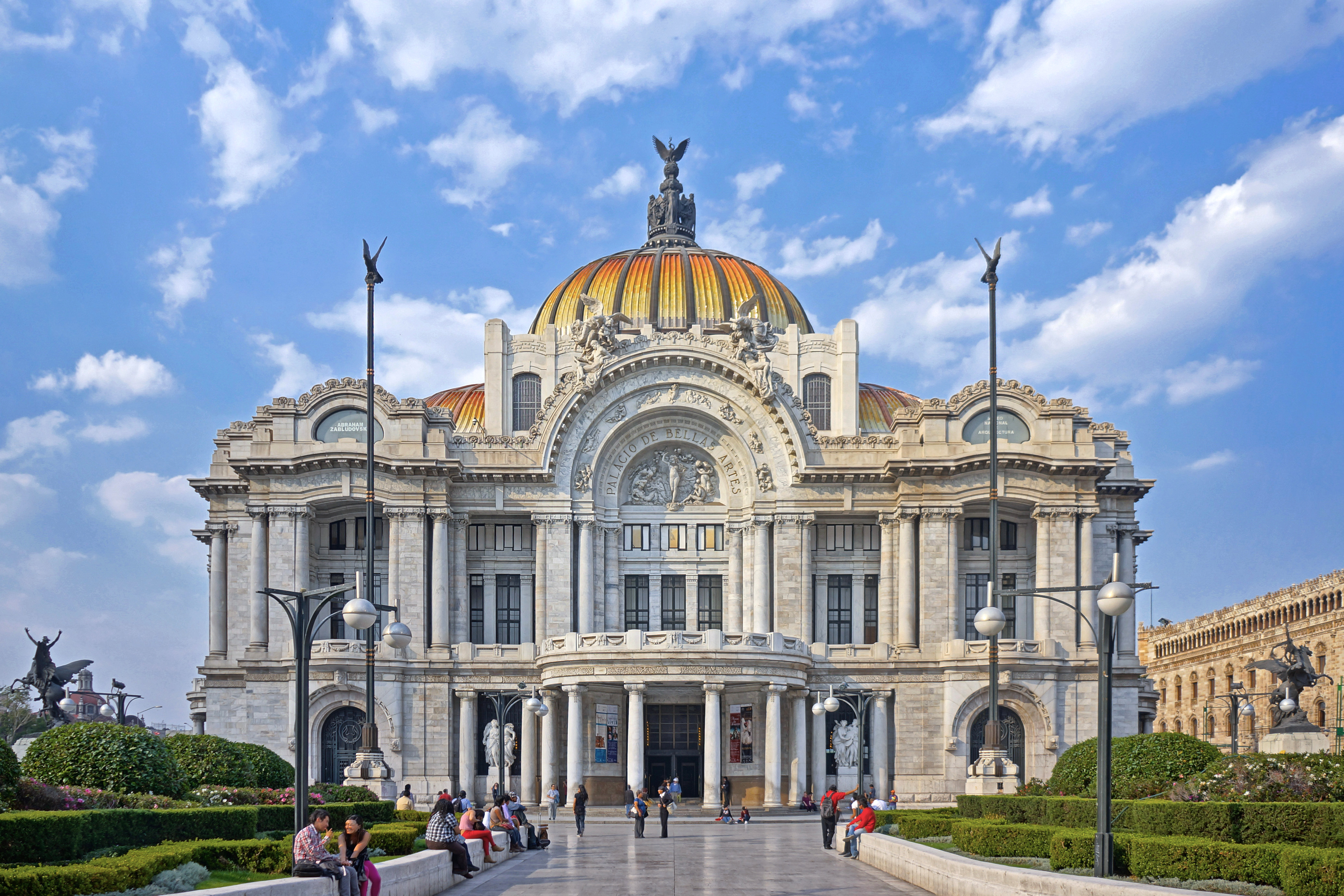
Bellas Artes, Mexico City

Ranking	Municipality	State	Population
1	Mexico City	Mexico City	9,209,944
2	Tijuana	Baja California	1,922,523
3	León	Guanajuato	1,721,215
4	Puebla	Puebla	1,692,181
5	Ecatepec	Mexico	1,645,352
6	Juárez	Chihuahua	1,512,450
7	Zapopan	Jalisco	1,476,491
8	Guadalajara	Jalisco	1,385,629
9	Monterrey	Nuevo León	1,142,994
10	Nezahualcóyotl	Mexico	1,077,208
2,450	San Mateo Tlapiltepec	Oaxaca	229
2,451	Santiago Nejapilla	Oaxaca	174
2,452	Santiago Tepetlapa	Oaxaca	130
2,453	Santo Domingo Tlatayapam	Oaxaca	113
2,454	Santa Magdalena Jicotlán	Oaxaca	81

=== By area ===
Data from the 2020 Mexican National Census.

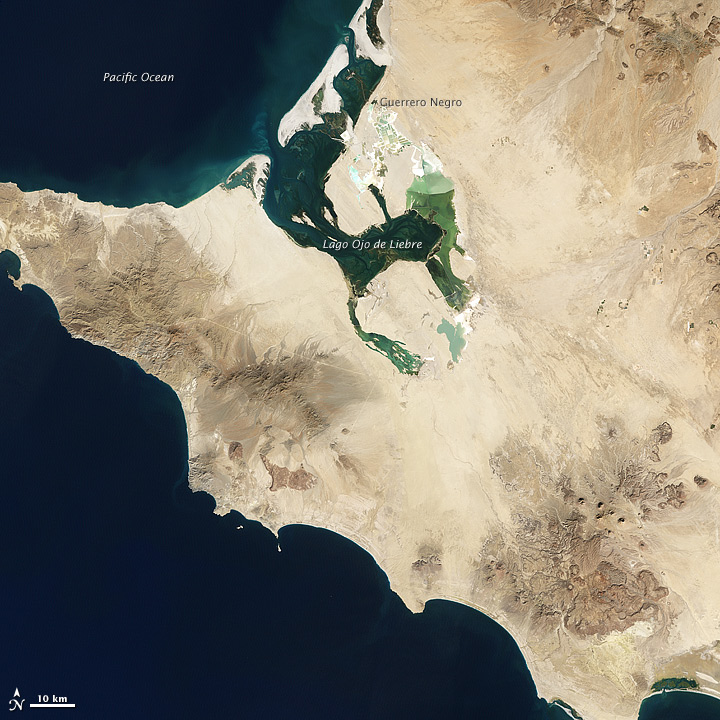
El Vizcaíno Biosphere Reserve, Mulegé

Ranking	Municipality	State	Land Area	
Ranking	Municipality	State	km^{2}	sq mi
1	Mulegé	Baja California Sur	32,953.3	12,723.3
2	San Quintín	Baja California	32,009.9	12,359.1
3	Ocampo	Coahuila	26,024.4	10,048.1
4	Ensenada	Baja California	19,526.8	7,539.3
5	Comondú	Baja California Sur	18,318.6	7,072.9
6	Ahumada	Chihuahua	16,910.0	6,529.0
7	Hermosillo	Sonora	15,724.3	6,071.2
8	La Paz	Baja California Sur	15,413.7	5,951.3
9	Mexicali	Baja California	14,528.3	5,609.4
10	Calakmul	Campeche	13,987.5	5,400.6
2,450	Ánimas Trujano	Oaxaca	3.0	1.2
2,451	San Pedro Cajonos	Oaxaca	2.8	1.1
2,452	Santa Inés Yatzeche	Oaxaca	2.4	0.9
2,453	Santa Cruz Amilpas	Oaxaca	2.3	0.9
2,454	Natividad	Oaxaca	2.2	0.8

=== By location ===
- Northernmost: Mexicali, Baja California (32°38′N 114°45′W)
- Southernmost: Suchiate, Chiapas (14°32′N 92°13′W)
- Westernmost: Ensenada, Baja California (29°4′N 118°26′W)
- Easternmost: Isla Mujeres, Quintana Roo (21°11′N 86°42′W)
- Geographical center: Villa de Cos, Zacatecas (23°55′N 102°9′W)
- Highest: Tlachichuca, Puebla and Calcahualco, Veracruz (5,636 m, Citlaltépetl volcano).
- Lowest: Mexicali, Baja California (-12 m, Laguna Salada).

== See also ==
- Settlement classification in Mexico
- Boroughs of Mexico
