= Administrative divisions of Mexico =

Mexico is a federal republic composed of 32 federative entities (Spanish: entidades federativas): 31 states and Mexico City. According to the Constitution of Mexico, the states of the federation are free and sovereign in all matters concerning their internal affairs. Since 2016, Mexico City has been a fully autonomous entity on par with the states. Each state federative entity has its own congress and constitution.

== Overview ==
The current structural hierarchy of Mexican administrative divisions are outlined by the Constitution of Mexico as well as the constitutions and laws of federative entities. The laws together established the following levels of administrative divisions. The levels in bold are those regulated by the federal constitution. (Spanish language equivalents are italicized in parentheses.)

- **State** (Estado)
  - Region (Región) or district (distrito) — only in some states
    - **Municipality** (Municipio)
      - City (Ciudad), town (villa), village (pueblo), or others
        - Colonia (Colonia) — only in some cities
- **Mexico City** (Ciudad de México)
  - **Borough** (Demarcación territorial)
    - Neighborhood (Colonia)

The Constitution of Mexico states the country constitutes 31 states (Article 43) and Mexico City (Article 44). As of March 2024, there are 2,460 municipalities under the 31 states, adding the 16 boroughs of Mexico City to constitute 2476 territorial units with local autonomy.

== Federative entities ==
There are currently 32 federative entities (Spanish: entidades federativas) of Mexico.

=== States ===
Mexican State Estado Mexicano (Spanish)
- Also known as: Free and Sovereign State Estado Libre y Soberano
- Category: Federated state
- Location: Mexico
- Number: 31
- Populations: Smallest 759,000 (Baja California Sur); Largest 17,102,000 (México)
- Areas: Smallest 4,000 km^{2} (1,543 sq mi) (Tlaxcala); Largest 247,460 km^{2} (95,543 sq mi) (Chihuahua)
- Government: State government
- Subdivisions: Municipalities

The states (Spanish: estados) of the Mexican Federation are officially free, sovereign, autonomous and independent of each other. They are free to govern themselves according to their own laws; each state has a constitution. States may not contradict the federal constitution, which covers issues of national competence. Nor may they ally with other states or any independent nation except with the consent of the whole federation, or in defense and security arrangements necessary to keep the border states secure during an invasion.

The political organization of each state is based on a separation of powers in a congressional system: legislative power is vested in a unicameral congress (the federal congress has two chambers), executive power is independent of the legislature and vested in a governor elected by universal suffrage, and judicial power is vested in a Superior Court of Justice. Since the states have legal autonomy, each has its own civil and penal codes and judicial body.

=== Mexico City ===
Mexico City Ciudad de México (Spanish)
- Also known as: Federal District Distrito Federal
- Category: Capital city
- Location: Mexico
- Number: 1
- Populations: 9,305,000
- Areas: 1,480 km^{2} (573 sq mi)
- Government: Mexico City Government
- Subdivisions: Boroughs

Mexico City (Spanish: Ciudad de México) is the capital of the United Mexican States. Before January 2016, the city was officially named the Federal District (Spanish: Distrito Federal).

Mexico City was separated from the State of Mexico, of which it was the capital, on November 18, 1824, to become the capital of the federation. As such, it belonged not to any state in particular but to all of them and to the federation. Therefore, the president of Mexico, who represented the federation, designated its head of government, previously referred to as the regent (regente) or head of department (jefe del departamento). However, the Federal District received more autonomy in 1997, and its citizens were then able to elect their chief of government for the first time.

In 2016, the Mexican Congress approved a constitutional reform eliminating the federal district and establishing Mexico City as a fully autonomous entity on par with the states. However, unlike the other states of the Union, it would receive funds for education and health. When full autonomy was granted, Mexico City adopted its own constitution (it previously had only an organic law, the Statute of Autonomy) and its boroughs expanded their local government powers.

=== Abbreviations and codes ===
Abbreviations of Mexican federative entities
Federative entity	Conventional abbreviation	2-letter code*	3-letter code (ISO 3166-2:MX)	Region
Aguascalientes	Ags.	AG	MX-AGU	North-Central
Baja California	B.C.	BC, BJ, BN	MX-BCN	Northwest
Baja California Sur	B.C.S.	BS	MX-BCS	Northwest
Campeche	Camp.	CM, CP	MX-CAM	Southeast
Chiapas	Chis.	CH, CS	MX-CHP	Southwest
Chihuahua	Chih.	CH, CI	MX-CHH	Northwest
Coahuila	Coah.	CH, CO, CU	MX-COA	Northeast
Colima	Col.	CL	MX-COL	West
Mexico City	CDMX	DF	MX-CMX	South-Central
Durango	Dgo.	DG	MX-DUR	Northwest
Guanajuato	Gto.	GJ, GT	MX-GUA	North-Central
Guerrero	Gro.	GE, GR	MX-GRO	Southwest
Hidalgo	Hgo.	HD, HG	MX-HID	East
Jalisco	Jal.	JA	MX-JAL	West
México	Edomex. or Méx.	EM, MX	MX-MEX	South-Central
Michoacán	Mich.	MH, MI	MX-MIC	West
Morelos	Mor.	MO, MR	MX-MOR	South-Central
Nayarit	Nay.	NA	MX-NAY	West
Nuevo León	N.L.	NL	MX-NLE	Northeast
Oaxaca	Oax.	OA	MX-OAX	Southwest
Puebla	Pue.	PU	MX-PUE	East
Querétaro	Qro.	QA, QE, QT	MX-QUE	North-Central
Quintana Roo	Q. Roo. or Q.R.	QI, QR	MX-ROO	Southeast
San Luis Potosí	S.L.P.	SL	MX-SLP	North-Central
Sinaloa	Sin.	SI	MX-SIN	Northwest
Sonora	Son.	SO	MX-SON	Northwest
Tabasco	Tab.	TA, TB	MX-TAB	Southeast
Tamaulipas	Tamps.	TA, TM	MX-TAM	Northeast
Tlaxcala	Tlax.	TL	MX-TLA	East
Veracruz	Ver.	VC, VE, VL, VZ	MX-VER	East
Yucatán	Yuc.	YC, YU	MX-YUC	Southeast
Zacatecas	Zac.	ZA, ZT	MX-ZAC	North-Central

*Mexico's post agency, Correos de México, does not offer an official list. Various competing commercially devised lists exist. The list here reflects choices among them according to these sources.

== Federal representation ==
In the Congress of the Union, the Senate represents the federative entities. Each federative entity elects three senators. Two are elected by universal suffrage on the principle of relative majority and one is assigned to the party that obtains the largest minority. In addition, the federation elects 32 at-large senators by proportional representation. These make a total of 128 Senators.

== Subdivisions of federative entities ==
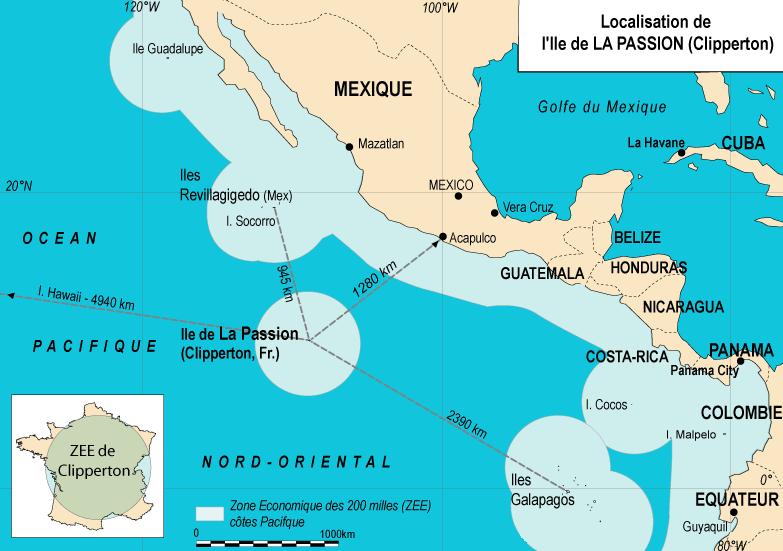
Location of Socorro Island and the rest of the Revillagigedo Archipelago, and extent of Mexico's western EEZ in the Pacific. The islands are part of Colima state, but under federal jurisdiction.

=== Regions and districts ===
The intrastate region (Spanish: región) or district (Spanish: distrito) are not constitutional administrative division levels. However, some states with higher numbers of municipalities establish such regions to support the administration.

Intrastate regions exist in the following 11 states:

- Chiapas groups its 124 municipalities into 15 economic regions.
- Guerrero groups its 81 municipalities into 7 economic regions.
- Hidalgo groups its 84 municipalities in 3 ways, into 26 micro regions, 14 operational regions, or 5 macro regions.
- Jalisco groups its 125 municipalities into 12 regions.
- México groups its 125 municipalities into 20 regions.
- Michoacán groups its 113 municipalities into 10 regions.
- Oaxaca groups its 570 municipalities into 30 districts, and then into 8 regions.
- San Luis Potosí groups its 58 municipalities into 4 regions.
- Tabasco groups its 17 municipalities in 2 ways, into 4 subregions, or 2 regions.
- Veracruz groups its 212 municipalities into 10 regions.
- Yucatán groups its 106 municipalities into 7 regions.

=== Municipalities and boroughs ===
According to the Constitution of Mexico, the states are internally divided into municipalities (Spanish: municipios), Mexico City is divided into boroughs (Spanish: demarcaciones territoriales). The autonomy of municipalities and boroughs within federative entities are protected by the Constitution of Mexico.

Each municipality is autonomous in its ability to elect its own administration. A council is headed by a municipal president (Spanish: presidente municipal) who is elected every three years. Each municipality has a council (Spanish: ayuntamiento) composed of councilors in terms of population size. In most cases, the council is responsible for providing all utilities required for its population. This concept, which arises from the Mexican Revolution, is known as a "free municipality".

The boroughs of Mexico City are colloquially known as alcaldías in Spanish, these boroughs kept the same territory and name as the former delegaciones. A borough is headed by a borough mayor (Spanish: alcalde) who is elected every three years.

As of March 2024, there are 2,460 municipalities in the 31 states of Mexico. The state with the highest number of municipalities is Oaxaca, with 570, and the state with the lowest number is Baja California Sur, with only five. There are 16 boroughs in Mexico City. These sums up to 2,476 division units.

=== Local settlements ===
The divisions of municipalities and boroughs are regulated solely by constitutions and laws of the respective federative entities. This level of divisions are collectively called localities (Spanish: localidades) by the National Institute of Statistics and Geography (Spanish: Instituto Nacional de Estadística y Geografía, INEGI) of the federal government.

Among the states, settlement classification schemes vary. Common types of localities include:

- City (Spanish: Ciudad) — for more populous places, see List of cities in Mexico,
- Town (Spanish: Villa) — for middle populous places, and
- Village (Spanish: Pueblo or Poblado) — for less populous places.

Some larger cities are consolidated with its own municipality and form a single level governance. In some cases, cities are further divided into delegaciones or colonias.

Mexico City further divides its boroughs into neighborhoods (Spanish: colonias).

== History ==
=== Constitutional empire ===
Political divisions of the First Mexican Empire. Treaty of Córdoba Acquisitions (1822–1823)

On September 27, 1821, after three centuries of Spanish rule, Mexico gained independence. The Treaty of Córdoba recognized part of the Viceroyalty of New Spain as an Independent Empire – "monarchist, constitutional and moderate". The new country named itself the Mexican Empire. The morning after the Army of the Three Guarantees entered Mexico City on September 28, 1821, Agustín de Iturbide ordered the Supreme Provisional Governmental Junta (September 1821 – February 1822) to meet to elect a president of the Imperial Regency and to issue a declaration of independence for the new nation. Iturbide was elected president of the Regency, and that afternoon the members of the Regency and the Supreme Junta signed the Declaration.

A minority of the Constituent Congress, looking for stability, elected Agustín de Iturbide as emperor. On July 21, 1822, Iturbide was crowned Emperor of Mexico. However, the Constitutional Empire quickly demonstrated the incompatibility of its two main parts: the Emperor and the Constituent Congress. The deputies were imprisoned just for expressing their opinions, and eventually Iturbide decided to dissolve the Congress and instead establish a National Board.

The lack of a legitimate legislature, the illegitimacy of the Emperor, and the absence of real solutions to the nation's problems increased revolutionary activity. Antonio López de Santa Anna proclaimed the Plan of Casa Mata, to which later joined Vicente Guerrero and Nicolás Bravo. Iturbide was forced to reestablish the Congress and, in a vain attempt to save the order and keep the situation favorable to his supporters, he abdicated the crown of the empire on March 19, 1823.

Congress nullified the designation of Iturbide and therefore the recognition of the abdication. It deemed the coronation of Iturbide to have been a logical mistake in consummation of Independence. The dissolution of the Empire was the first political realignment of independent Mexico.

=== Federal republic ===
Political divisions of Mexico after the Federal Constitution of the United Mexican States of 1824 was enacted. Federal territory Sovereign state

After the fall of the Empire, a triumvirate called the Supreme Executive Power was created. The provisional government created the Federal Republic, and it was in effect from April 1, 1823, to October 10, 1824.

Unrest in the provinces was widespread. On May 21, 1823, The Founding Plan of the Federal Republic was enacted. Its sixth article stated, "The component parts of the Republic are free, sovereign and independent States in that which touches internal administration and government". Most of the Free States, which were invited to form the Federal Republic, joined the Union, except for the five Central American provinces, the former Captaincy General of Guatemala, which formed their own Federal Republic.

On January 31, 1824, the decree to create a Constitutive Act of the Mexican Federation was issued, which incorporated the basic structure of the Federal Republic. It was determined that the criteria for inviting states to the federation should be that they "...not be so few that through expansion and wealth in a few years they be able to aspire to constitute themselves as independent nations, breaking the federal bond, nor so many that through lack of manpower and resources the system should come to be unworkable."

Between 1823 and 1824, some of the Free States created their own constitutions, and others had already installed a Constituent Congress. Special cases were those of Yucatán, which on December 23, 1823, decided to join the federation but as a Federated Republic, and Chiapas, which decided by referendum to join the federation on September 14, 1824.

On October 4, 1824, the Federal Constitution of the United Mexican States of 1824 was enacted. The constitution officially created the United Mexican States. The country was composed of 19 states and 4 federal territories. After the publication of the constitution, on November 18, the Federal District was created. On November 24, Tlaxcala, which had retained a special status since the colonial era, was incorporated as a territory.

On October 10, 1824, Guadalupe Victoria took office as the first President of Mexico.

=== Centralist Republic ===
The Centralist Republic with the separatist movements generated by the dissolution of the Federal Republic. Area in rebellion Area claimed by the Republics of Texas and the Rio Grande Area not in rebellion

The political structure of the Republic was amended by a decree on October 3, 1835, when the centralist system was established.

The constituent states of the Republic lost their freedom, autonomy, independence, and sovereignty by being totally subordinated to the central government. However, the territorial division itself was the same, as the text of Article 8 of the Law determined: The national territory is divided into departments, on the basis of population, location and other leading circumstances: its number, extension and subdivisions, would be detailed by constitutional law.

The Seven Constitutional Laws (Spanish: Siete Leyes Constitucionales) were promulgated on December 30, 1836. The 1st article confirmed the decree of the law October 3, 1835; the Republic would be divided into departments, these in districts and the districts in parties. The 2nd article posited that the division of the Republic into departments would be under a special law with constitutional character. On December 30, 1835, a transitory decree was added to the Seven Laws. The decree stated that the territory of Tlaxcala and the Federal District would become a part of the Department of Mexico. The territories of Alta and Baja California would form the department of the Californias. Coahuila y Tejas would be divided into two departments. Colima would form part of Michoacán, and Aguascalientes would be declared a department.

This period of political instability caused several conflicts between the central government and the entities of the country, and there were rebellions in several states:

- Yucatán, due to being a Federated Republic, declared itself independent in 1840 (officially in 1841). The República de Yucatán (English: Republic of Yucatán) rejoined Mexico in 1848.
- Texas declared its independence and declared war against the central government of Mexico. The Republic of Texas was created. Texas remained independent until 1845, when it joined the United States of America. From 1861 to 1865, Texas was part of the Confederate States of America. After the defeat of the Confederacy in the American Civil War (1861–65) and Reconstruction, Texas rejoined the United States of America in 1870.
- In 1840, the states of Nuevo León, Tamaulipas and Coahuila declared themselves independent from Mexico for just under 250 days; the República del Río Grande never consolidated because independent forces were defeated by the centralist forces.
- Tabasco declared its separation from Mexico in February 1841, in protest against centralism and the imposed sanctions by centralist president Anastasio Bustamante. It rejoined in December 1842.

On September 11, 1842, the region of Soconusco joined Mexico as part of the department of Chiapas.

=== Restoration of the Republic and Second Empire ===
The Federal Republic was restored by the interim president José Mariano Salas on August 22, 1846. The state of Guerrero was provisionally erected in 1849, on the condition that it be approved by the legislatures of the states of México, Puebla and Michoacán, whose territories would be affected.

On February 5, 1857, the Federal Constitution of the United Mexican States of 1857 was enacted. In 1864, however, after the French intervention, the conservative Mexicans restored the constitutional monarchy, known as the Second Mexican Empire, led by the emperor Maximilian of Habsburg and supported by the French army of Napoleon III. The Empire was deposed in 1867 by the republican forces of Benito Juárez and the Federal Republic was restored again under the Constitution of 1857.

The Political Constitution of the United Mexican States of 1917 was the result of the Mexican Revolution. The third Constitution of Mexico confirmed the federal system of government that is currently in effect.

== See also ==
- Administrative division
- List of Latin American countries by Human Development Index
- Territorial evolution of Mexico

== Notes ==
- ^a Some of these flags are used in states like Civil or Historic Flags (Yucatán, Hidalgo, Baja California, Michoacán) and, thought by many as the official state flags designated by President Ernesto Zedillo in 1999, they can be found in use. The others are proposed to state legislatures by private groups that lack official approval. Only the States of Jalisco and Tlaxcala have formally changed their flags.
