= Oaxaca =

State of Mexico

Coordinates: 17.055°N 96.655°W

- State
- Free and Sovereign State of Oaxaca; Estado Libre y Soberano de Oaxaca (Spanish); Huāxyacac (Nahuatl)
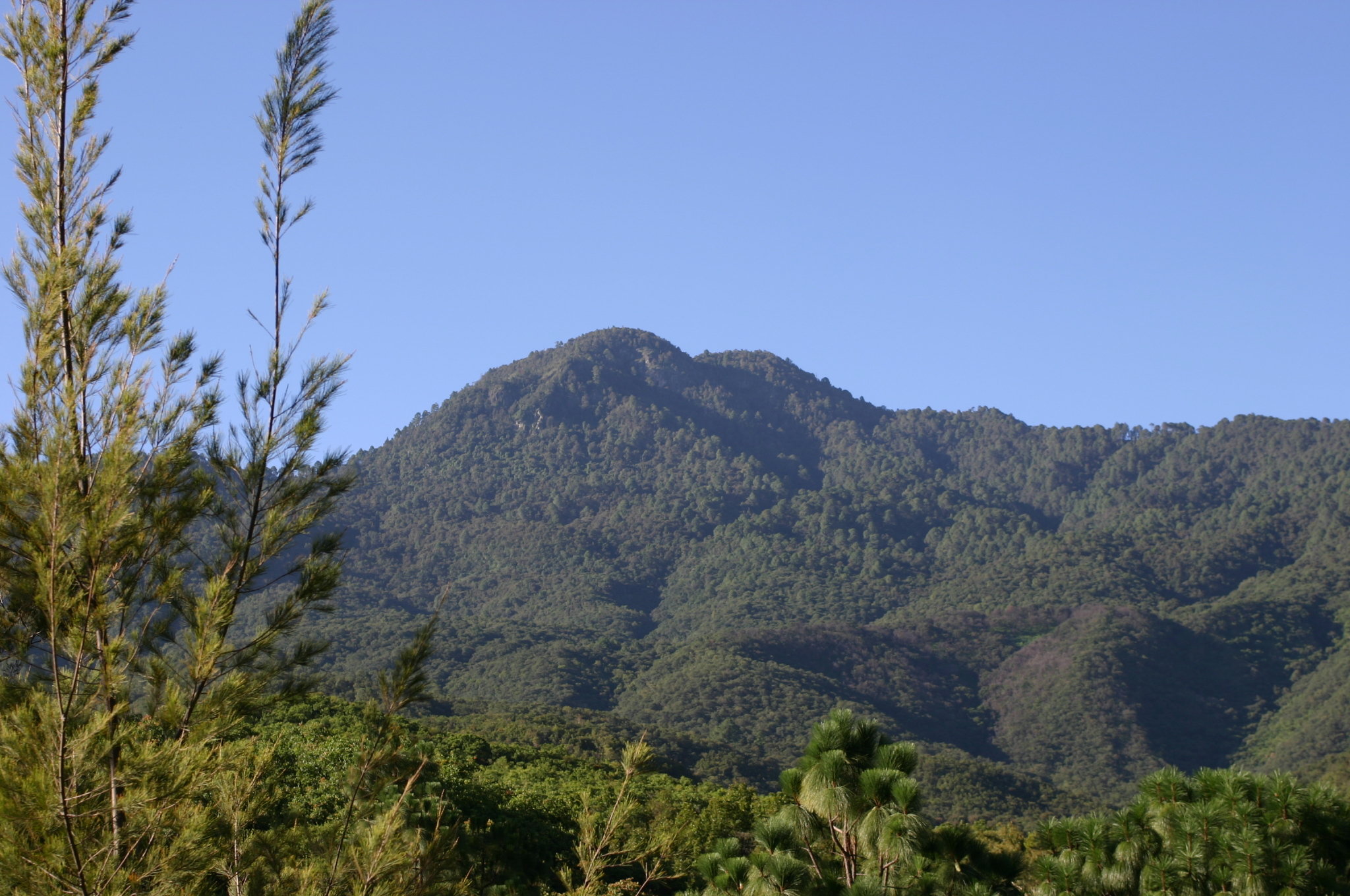
- The Benito Juárez National Park

- Coat of arms
- Motto: El Respeto al Derecho Ajeno es la Paz (Respect for the rights of others is peace)
- Anthem: Dios Nunca Muere (De facto) (God Never Dies)
- State of Oaxaca within Mexico
- Country: Mexico
- Capital and largest city: Oaxaca de Juárez
- Municipalities: 570
- Admission: December 21, 1823
- Order: 3rd

Government
  - Body: Congress of Oaxaca
  - Governor: Salomón Jara Cruz (MORENA)
  - Senators: Susana Harp Iturribarría; Adolfo Gómez Hernández; Raúl Bolaños-Cacho Cué
  - Deputies: Federal deputies: • Carol Antonio Altamirano; • Maria del Carmen Bautista Peláez; • Víctor Blas López; • Armando Contreras Castillo; • Rosalinda Domínguez Flores; • Teófilo Manuel García Corpus; • Daniel Gutiérrez Gutiérrez; • Irma Juan Carlos; • Virginia Merino García; • Irineo Molina Espinoza; • Beatriz Dominga Pérez López; • Alejandro Ponce Cobos; • Azael Santiago Chepi; • Iran Santiago Manuel; • Graciela Zavaleta Sánchez; • Antonia Natividad Díaz Jiménez; • Dulce Alejandra García Morlan; • Margarita García García; • Maribel Martínez Ruiz; • Benjamín Robles Montoya

Area
  - Total: 93,757 km^{2} (36,200 sq mi)
- Ranked 5th
- Highest elevation: 3,720 m (12,200 ft)

Population (2020)
  - Total: 4,132,148
  - Rank: 10th
  - Density: 44.073/km^{2} (114.15/sq mi)
  - Rank: 22nd
- Demonym(s): Oaxacan (Spanish: Oaxaqueño, -a)

GDP (2022)
  - Total: MXN 480 billion (US$23.9 billion)
  - Per capita: US$5,657; 30th of 32
- Time zone: UTC−06:00 (CST)
- Postal code: 68–71
- Area code: Area codes 1 and 2: • 236; • 274; • 283; • 287; • 924; • 951; • 953; • 954; • 958; • 971; • 972; • 994; • 995
- ISO 3166 code: MX-OAX
- HDI: ▲0.723 high Ranked 31st of 32
- Website: Official Web Site

Oaxaca, (Note: /wəˈhækə/ wə-HAK-ə, also US: /wɑːˈhɑːkɑː/ wah-HAH-kah; Spanish: [waˈxaka], from Classical Nahuatl: Huāxyacac [waːʃˈjakak]) officially the Free and Sovereign State of Oaxaca, (Note: Spanish: Estado Libre y Soberano de Oaxaca) is one of the 31 states of Mexico. It is divided into 570 municipalities, of which 418 (almost three quarters) are governed by the system of usos y costumbres (customs and traditions) with recognized local forms of self-governance. Its capital city is Oaxaca de Juárez.

Oaxaca is in Southern Mexico. It is bordered by the states of Guerrero to the west, Puebla to the northwest, Veracruz to the north, and Chiapas to the east. To the south, Oaxaca has a significant coastline on the Pacific Ocean.

The state is best known for its Indigenous peoples and cultures. The most numerous and best known are the Zapotecs and the Mixtecs, but 16 are officially recognized. These cultures have survived better than most others in Mexico due to the state's rugged and isolating terrain. Most live in the Central Valleys region, which is also an economically important area for tourism, with people attracted for its archeological sites such as Monte Albán, and Mitla, and its various native cultures and crafts. Another important tourist area is the coast, which has the major resort of Huatulco and sandy beaches of Puerto Escondido, Puerto Ángel, Zipolite, Bahia de Tembo, and Mazunte. Oaxaca is also one of Mexico's most biologically diverse states, ranking in the top three, along with Chiapas and Veracruz, for numbers of reptiles, amphibians, mammals and plants.

== History ==
=== Name ===
The name of the state comes from the name of its capital city, Oaxaca. This name comes from the Nahuatl word Huaxyacac, which refers to a tree called a guaje in Spanish (Leucaena leucocephala) found around the capital city. The name was originally applied to the Valley of Oaxaca by Nahuatl-speaking Aztecs and passed on to the Spanish during the conquest of the Oaxaca region. The modern state was created in 1824, and the state seal was designed by Alfredo Canseco Feraud and approved by the government of Eduardo Vasconcelos. "Huaxyacac" [waːʃ.ˈja.kak] was transliterated as "Oaxaca" using Medieval Spanish orthography, in which the x represented the voiceless postalveolar fricative ([ʃ], the equivalent of English sh in "shop"), making "Oaxaca" pronounced as [waˈʃaka]. But during the 16th century the voiceless fricative sound evolved into a voiceless velar fricative ([x], like the ch in Scottish "loch"), and Oaxaca began to be pronounced [waˈxaka]. In present-day Spanish, Oaxaca is pronounced [waˈxaka] or [waˈhaka], the latter pronunciation used mostly in dialects of southern Mexico, the Caribbean, much of Central America, some places in South America, and the Canary Islands and western Andalusia in Spain, where [x] has become a voiceless glottal fricative ([h]).

=== Prehistoric and pre-Hispanic period ===
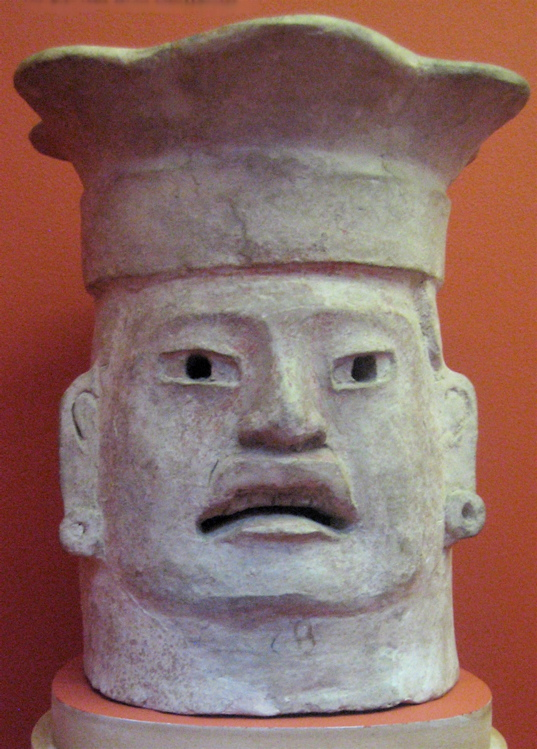
Effigy Head Brazier (500 BC – 200 BC)

Most of what is known about prehistoric Oaxaca comes from work in the Central Valleys region. Evidence of human habitation dating to about 11,000 years BCE has been found in the Guilá Naquitz cave near the town of Mitla. This area was recognized as a UNESCO World Heritage site in 2010 in recognition of the "earliest known evidence of domesticated plants in the continent, while corn cob fragments from the same cave are said to be the earliest documented evidence for the domestication of maize." More finds of nomadic peoples date to about 5000 BCE, with some evidence of the beginning of agriculture. By 2000 BCE, agriculture had been established in the Central Valleys region of the state, with sedentary villages. The diet developed around this time remained until the Spanish Conquest, consisting primarily of harvested corn, beans, chocolate, tomatoes, chili peppers, squash and gourds. Meat was generally hunted and included tepescuintle, turkey, deer, peccary, armadillo and iguana.

The oldest known major settlements, such as Yanhuitlán and Laguna Zope, are also in this area. The latter settlement is known for its small figures called "pretty women" or "baby face." Between 1200 and 900 BCE, pottery was produced in the area. This pottery has been linked with similar work done in La Victoria, Guatemala. Other important settlements from the same period include Tierras Largas, San José Mogote and Guadalupe, whose ceramics show Olmec influence. The major native language family, Oto-Manguean, is thought to have been spoken in northern Oaxaca around 4400 BCE and to have evolved into nine distinct branches by 1500 BCE.

Historic events in Oaxaca as far back as the 12th century are described in pictographic codices painted by Zapotecs and Mixtecs in the beginning of the colonial period, but outside of the information that can be obtained through their study, little historical information from pre-colonial Oaxaca exists, and our knowledge of this period relies largely on archaeological remains. By 500 BCE, Oaxaca's central valleys were mostly inhabited by the Zapotecs, with the Mixtecs on the western side. These two groups were often in conflict during the pre-Hispanic period. Archeological evidence indicates that between 750 and 1521, there may have been population peaks of as high as 2.5 million.

The Zapotecs were the earliest to gain dominance over the Central Valleys region. The first major dominion was centered in Monte Albán, which flourished from 500 BCE to AD 750. At its height, Monte Albán was home to 25,000 people and the capital city of the Zapotec nation. It remained a secondary center of power for the Zapotecs until the Mixtecs overran it in 1325. The site has several notable features, including the Danzantes, a set of stone reliefs, and the finding of fine quality ceramics.

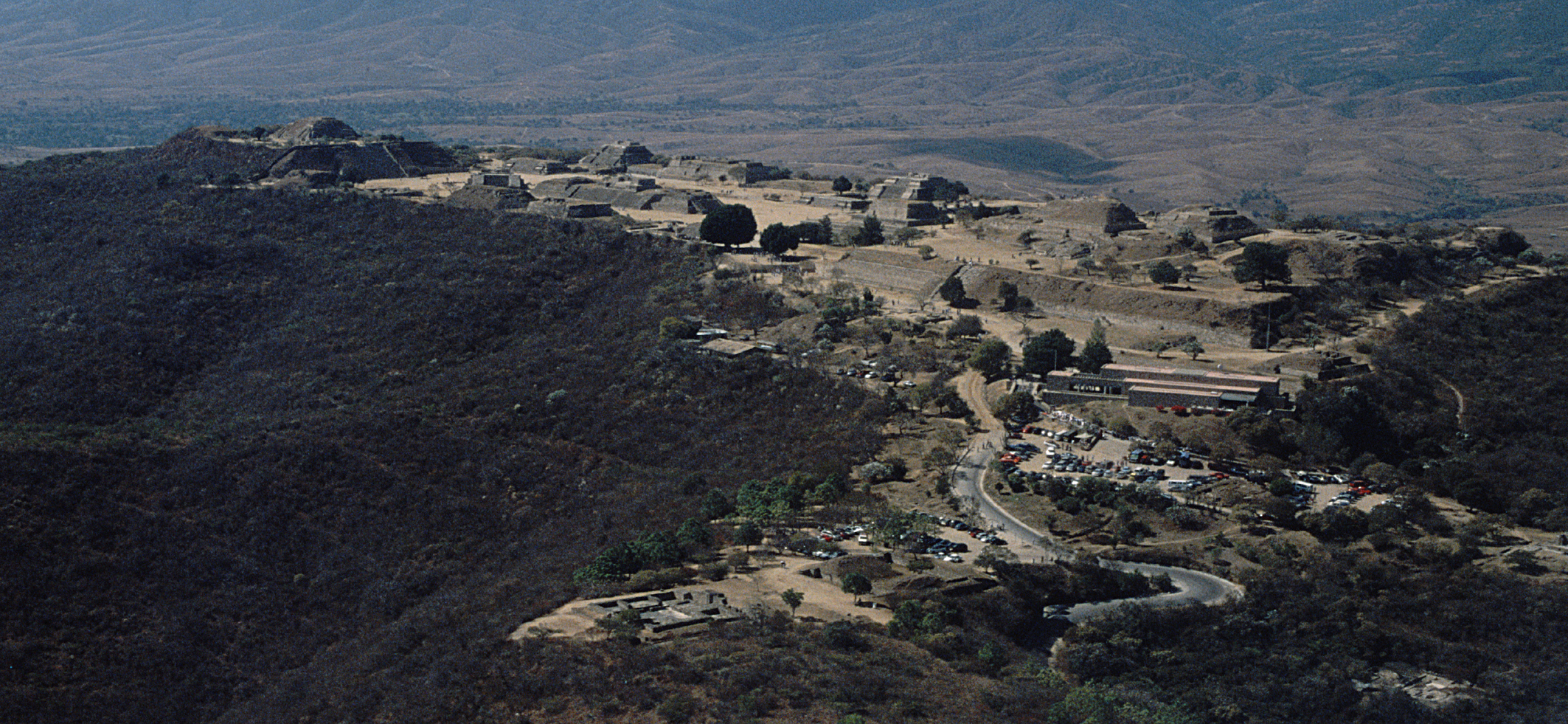
Looking southwest over the site of Monte Albán

Starting from AD 750 previous large urban centers such as Monte Alban fell across the Oaxaca area and smaller dominions grew and evolved until the Spanish Conquest in 1521. Between 700 and 1300, the Mixtec were scattered among various dominions, including those of Achiutla, Tequixtepec-Chazumba, Apoala and Coixtlahuaca. The Zapotecs occupied a large region from Central Valleys region to the Isthmus of Tehuantepec. No major city-state like Monte Albán arose again, with villages and city-states remaining small, between 1,000 and 3,000 people with a palace, temple, market and residences. There were also some Mesoamerican ball courts. These and larger centers doubled as military fortresses in time of invasion. Important Zapotec and Mixtec sites include Yagul, Zaachila, Inguiteria, Yanhuitlan, Tamazulapan, Tejupan, and Teposcolula. For nearly all this time, these various entities were at war with one another, and faced the threat of Aztec expansion.

While the Zapotec remained dominant in many parts of the Central Valleys and into the Isthmus of Tehuantepec, the Mixtec were pushing into Zapotec territory, taking Monte Alban. In areas they conquered, they became prolific builders, leaving behind numerous and still unexplored sites. But the conquest of the Central Valleys was never completed, with pressure coming from the Aztecs in Tenochtitlan in the 14th and 15th centuries. The Zapotecs and Mixtecs both allied themselves and fought among themselves as they tried to maintain their lands and valuable trade routes between the high central plains of Mexico and Central America.

The first Aztecs arrived in the Oaxaca area in 1250, but true expansion into the region began in the 15th century. In 1457, Moctezuma I invaded the Tlaxiaco and Coixtlahuaca areas, gaining control, demanding tribute and establishing military outposts. These were Mixtec lands at first, pushing these people even further into Zapotec territory. Under Axayacatl and Tizoc, the Aztec began to take control of trade routes in the area and part of the Pacific Coast. By this time, the Zapotec were led by Cosijoeza with the government in Zaachila in the latter 15th century. Under Ahuitzotl, the Aztecs temporarily pushed the Zapotecs into Tehuantepec and established a permanent military base at Huaxyacac (Oaxaca city). The Aztecs were stopped only by the Spanish Conquest. The conquest changed most of the place names in parts of Oaxaca from their Nahuatl names. In 1486 the Aztecs established a fort on the hill of Huaxyácac (now called El Fortín), overlooking the present city of Oaxaca. This was the major Aztec military base charged with the enforcement of tribute collection and control of trade routes. Aztec rule in Oaxaca lasted only a little more than 30 years.

=== Spanish colonization ===
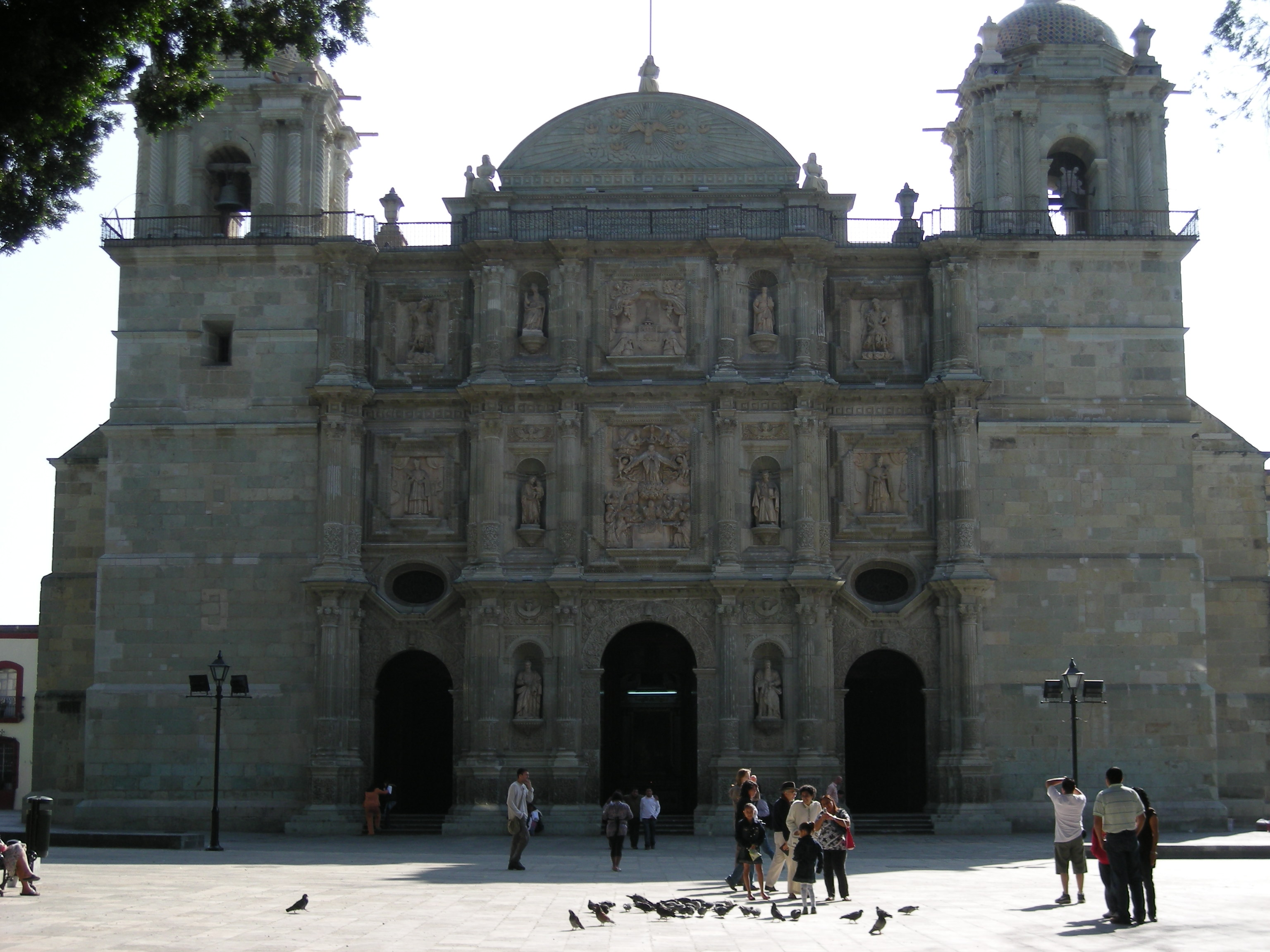
Cathedral of Our Lady of the Assumption, the motherchurch of the Oaxacan Archdiocese

Very soon after the fall of Tenochtitlan (Mexico City), Spaniards arrived in Oaxaca. Moctezuma II had informed Hernando Cortes that the area had gold. In addition, when Zapotec leaders heard about the Spanish conquest of the Aztec Empire, they sent an offer of an alliance. Several captains and representatives were sent to the area to explore, looking for gold and routes to the Pacific to establish trade routes to Asian spice markets. The most prominent of Cortés's captains to arrive here were Gonzalo de Sandoval, Francisco de Orozco and Pedro de Alvarado. They overcame the main Aztec military stronghold only four months after the fall of Tenochtitlan. Their reports about the area prompted Cortés to seek the title of the Marquis of the Valley of Oaxaca from the Spanish Crown.

The valley Zapotecs, the Mixtecs of the Upper Mixteca, the Mazatecas and the Cuicatecas, for the most part, chose not to fight the newcomers, instead negotiating to keep most of the old hierarchy but with ultimate authority to the Spanish. Resistance to the new order was sporadic and confined to the Pacific coastal plain, the Zapotec Sierra, the Mixea region and the Isthmus of Tehuantepec. The Mixe put up the most resistance to intrusions on their lands. They not only resisted during the first decade or so of Spanish occupation, like other groups, but through the rest of the 16th century. The last major Mixe rebellion came in 1570, when they burned and looted Zapotec communities and threatened to destroy the Spanish presidio of Villa Alta. This rebellion was put down by the Spanish, in alliance with about 2,000 Mixtecs and Aztecs. From this point, the Mixe retreated far into the mountains to isolate themselves, where they remain today.

The first priest in the territory was Juan Diaz, who accompanied Francisco de Orozco and built the first church in what is now the city of Oaxaca. He was followed by Bartolome de Olmade and others who began the superficial conversion of a number of indigenous people, including the baptism of Zapotec leader Cosijoeza. In 1528, the Dominicans settled in the city of Oaxaca, forming the Bishopric of Oaxaca in 1535, and began to spread out from there, eventually reaching Tehuantepec and the coast. Other orders followed, such as the Jesuits in 1596, the Mercedarians in 1601, and others in the 17th and 18th centuries.

Spanish conquest and subsequent colonization had a devastating effect on the native population, due to European diseases and forced labor. In some areas the native population nearly or completely disappeared. It has been estimated that the native population of the region declined from 1.5 million in 1520 to 150,000 in 1650. Eventually, this prompted the Spanish to import African slaves to some regions of the state, mostly in the Costa Chica. This poor treatment of indigenous and African populations continued through the colonial period. Initially, the Spanish did not change native power structures and allowed nobles to keep their privileges as long as they were loyal to the Spanish crown. But all indigenous people were eventually lumped into one category as the Spanish halted warfare among the city-states and created the official category of "indio" (Indian).

Settlers arriving from Spain brought with them domestic animals that had never been seen in Oaxaca: horses, cows, goats, sheep, chickens, mules and oxen. New crops such as sugar cane, vanilla and tobacco were introduced. Landholding remained mostly in indigenous hands, even though only 9% of Oaxaca's terrain is arable. Spanish officials and merchants tried to take indigenous privileges due to their social status, but this was resisted. While some of this was violent, the dominant response was to resort to the administrative-judicial system or yield. Violence was reserved for the worst of situations. One native product to reach economic importance during the colonial period was the cochineal insect, used for the making of dyes for textiles. This product was exported to Europe, especially in the 17th and 18th centuries. The use of this insect faded in the 19th century with the discovery of cheaper dyes including synthetic colorants.

For much of the colonial period, the state (then an intendencia or province) was relatively isolated with few roads and other forms of communication. Most politics and social issues were on the local level. Despite Spanish domination, the indigenous peoples of Oaxaca have maintained much of their culture and identity, more so than most other places in Mexico. Part of this is due to the geography of the land, making many communities isolated.

=== Independence ===
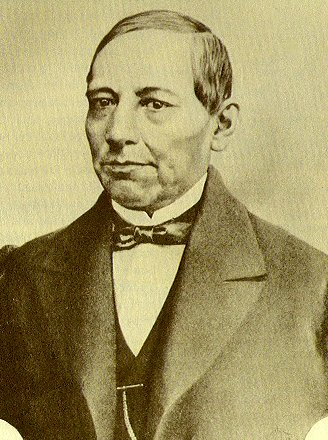
Benito Juárez

By 1810, the city of Oaxaca had 18,000 inhabitants, most of whom were mestizos or mixed indigenous/European. During the Mexican War of Independence the government of this area remained loyal to the Spanish Crown. When representatives of Miguel Hidalgo y Costilla came to meet with them, they were hanged and their heads left out in view. Some early rebel groups emerged in the state, such as those led by Felipe Tinoco and Catarino Palacios, but they were also eventually executed. After 1812, insurgents began to have some success in the state, especially in the areas around Huajuapan de León, where Valerio Trujano defended the city against royalist forces until José María Morelos y Pavón came in with support to keep the area in rebel hands. After that point, insurgents had greater success in various parts of the state, but the capital remained in royalist hands until the end of the war.

The state was initially a department after the war ended in 1821, but after the fall of emperor Agustín de Iturbide, it became a state in 1824, with Jose Maria Murguia as its first governor.

During the 19th century, Oaxaca and the rest of Mexico was split between liberal (federalist) and conservative (centralist) factions. The political and military struggles between the factions resulted in wars and intrigues. Vicente Guerrero, a liberal, was executed by firing squad in Cuilapam in 1831. Liberal Manuel Gomez Pedraza became governor in 1832 but was opposed by General Estaban Moctezuma. He and commandant Luis Quintanar persecuted liberals in the state, including Benito Juárez. The constant warfare had a detrimental effect on the state's economy and those in the Tehuantepec area supported a separatist movement, which partially succeeded in the 1850s.

Two Oaxacans, Juárez and Porfirio Díaz, were prominent players in the Reform War. It is difficult to overstate Juárez's meaning to the state. He was born on March 21, 1806, in the village of San Pablo Guelatao and was full-blooded Zapotec. He studied to be a priest, then a lawyer. In 1847, Juárez became governor of Oaxaca, but still faced stern opposition from conservatives such as Lope San Germán. With the success of the Plan de Ayutla, Juárez became governor again, and worked to remove privileges and properties from the Church and landed classes. The Constitution of 1857 was ratified in Oaxaca city, and Juárez left the governor's position to become President of Mexico. He was president during one of Mexico's most turbulent times, fighting invading French forces and conservatives. As a liberal, he imposed many of the reforms that remain today, including those in education and separation of church and state. He is also considered a legend and a symbol for the indigenous population of the state.

Porfirio Díaz was Juárez's ally through the French Intervention. French imperial forces took Oaxaca city, which was defended by Díaz, landing him in prison. The capital was later recaptured by the liberals under Carlos Oronoz, but soon after Juárez took back the presidency, Díaz declared rebellion against him from Oaxaca in 1872 under the Plan de Tuxtepec. Juárez died in office. Díaz obtained the presidency and did not relinquish it until the Mexican Revolution.

=== Late 19th century to present ===
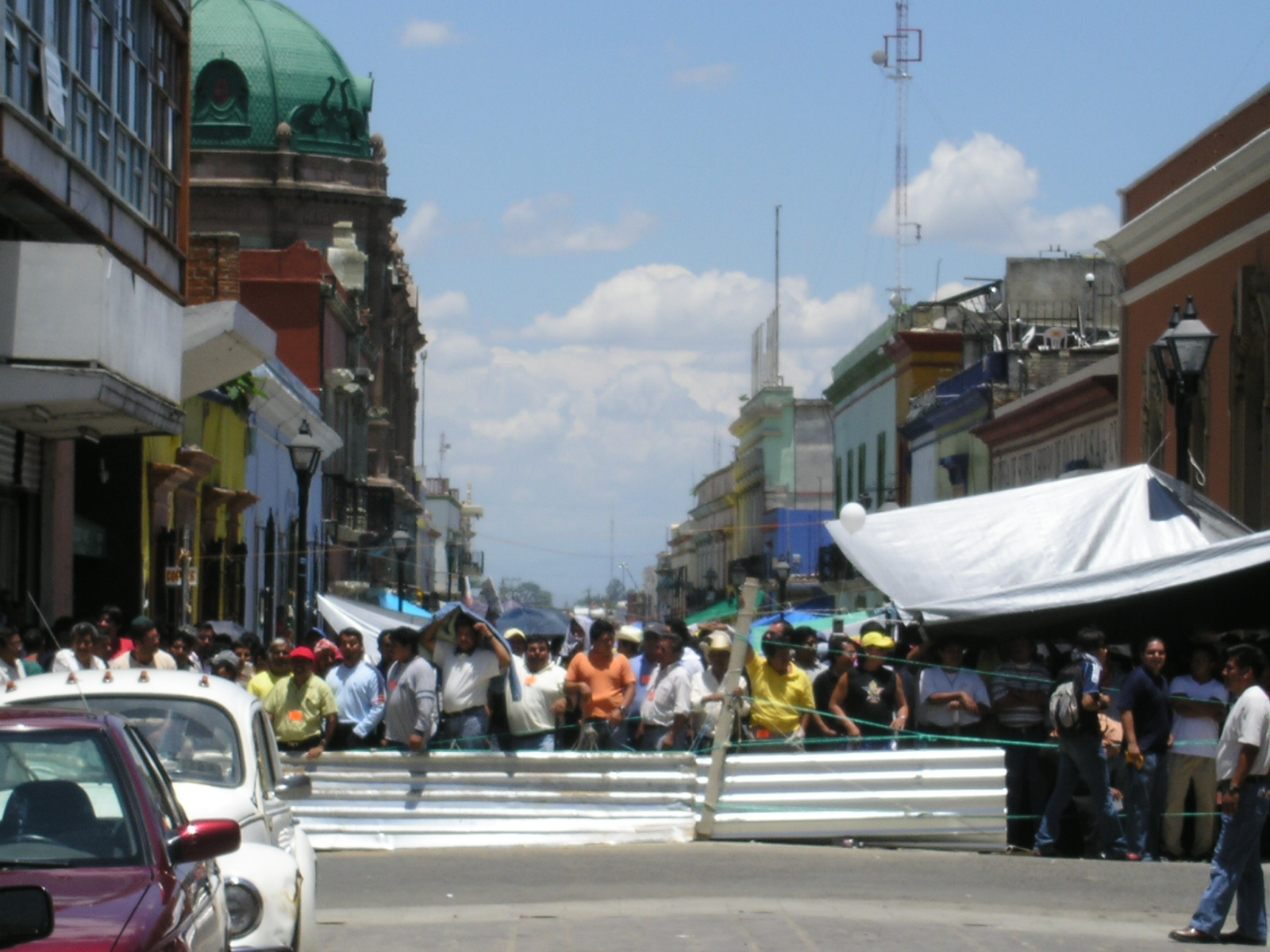
Protesters in Oaxaca, 2006

During Díaz's rule, called the Porfiriato, a number of modernization efforts were undertaken in the state, such as public lighting, first with gas then with electricity, railroad lines, new agriculture techniques and the revitalization of commerce. Most of the benefits of these advances went to national and international corporations, and workers and indigenous farmers organized against the regime.

After the Mexican Revolution broke out, Díaz was soon ousted and the rest of the war was among the various factions that had power in different parts of the country. Various leaders such as Francisco I. Madero, Victoriano Huerta and Venustiano Carranza came to the state during this time, but the most important force in the area was the Liberation Army of the South under Emiliano Zapata. This army allied with and fought against the previous leaders, especially Venustiano Carranza, and held various portions of the state until 1920. At the end of the Revolution, a new state constitution was written and accepted in 1922.

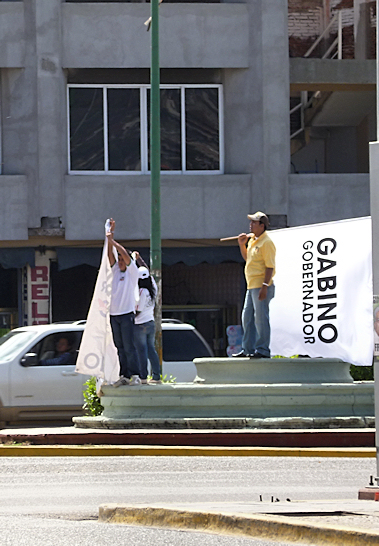
Workers campaigning in the historic 2010 state government election

A series of major disasters occurred in Oaxaca from the 1920s to the 1940s. In 1928, a series of earthquakes destroyed many of the buildings in the capital. A much larger earthquake in 1931 was the largest in the state's history, devastating a number of cities along the coast. The 1930s brought the Great Depression, which along with the disasters, prompted wide-scale migration to Mexico City. In 1944, torrential rains caused extensive flooding in the Tuxtepec region, resulting in hundreds of deaths.

In the 1940s and 1950s, new infrastructure projects were begun. These included the Izúcar-Tehuantepec section of the Panamerican Highway and the construction of the Miguel Alemán Dam. From the 1980s to the present, there has been much development of the tourism industry in the state. This tourism, as well as the population growth of the capital, prompted the construction of the Oaxaca-Mexico City highway in 1994. Development of tourism has been strongest in the Central Valleys area surrounding the capital, with secondary developments in Huatulco and other locations along the coast. This development was threatened by violence associated with the 2006 uprising, which severely curtailed the number of incoming tourists for several years.

On February 12, 2008, a 6.4 magnitude earthquake was recorded in Oaxaca.

From the Mexican Revolution until the 2000s, the ruling PRI party controlled almost all Oaxacan politics, from the local to the state level. Challenges to the rule were sporadic and included the student movements of the 1970s, which did bring down the state government. Teachers' strikes were frequent thereafter, culminating in the 2006 uprising in Oaxaca city, which brought in groups protesting the heavy marginalization of the poor. The PRI lost its 80-year hold on the state government in 2010 with the election of the PAN gubernatorial candidate Gabino Cué Monteagudo. This has led to speculation of major changes for the state.

In 2017, a series of earthquakes brought death and destruction to parts of Mexico, including Oaxaca. According to the US Geological Survey, on September 23, 2017, a magnitude 6.1 earthquake shook Matías Romero, about 275 miles southeast of Mexico City. The epicenter was about 12 miles from Matías Romero and approximately halfway between the two even more violent earthquakes in Mexico earlier that month, of which it is considered an aftershock. On September 8, an 8.1 magnitude quake struck off of the southern Pacific coast, near Chiapas state. Mexico City, on September 19, then endured a 7.1 magnitude quake, which also marked the 32nd anniversary of the devastating 1985 earthquake, in which more than 10,000 people were killed.

On June 23, 2020, a preliminary 7.4 magnitude earthquake struck the region, triggering tsunami warnings for parts of the area. At least 10 people were killed.

== Geography ==
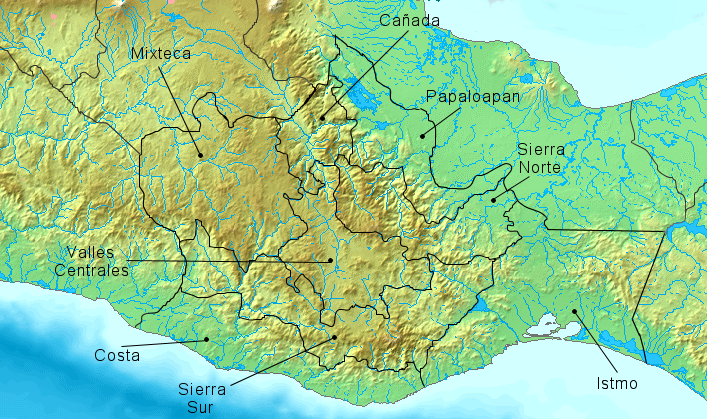
Map of Oaxaca

The state of Oaxaca is located in Southeastern Mexico, bordered by the states of Puebla, Veracruz, Chiapas and Guerrero, with the Pacific Ocean to the south. It has a territory of 93,967 km^{2} (36,281 sq mi), accounting for less than 5% of Mexico's territory. Here several mountain chains come together, with the elevation varying from sea level to 3,759 m (12,333 ft) asl, averaging at 1,500 m (4,921 ft) asl. Oaxaca has one of the most rugged terrains in Mexico, with mountain ranges that abruptly fall into the sea. Between these mountains are mostly narrow valleys, canyons and ravines. Major elevations in the state include Zempoaltepetl (3,396 m or 11,142 ft asl), El Espinazo del Diablo, Nindú Naxinda Yucunino and Cerro Encantado. Oaxaca has 533 km (331 mi) of coastline with nine major bays.

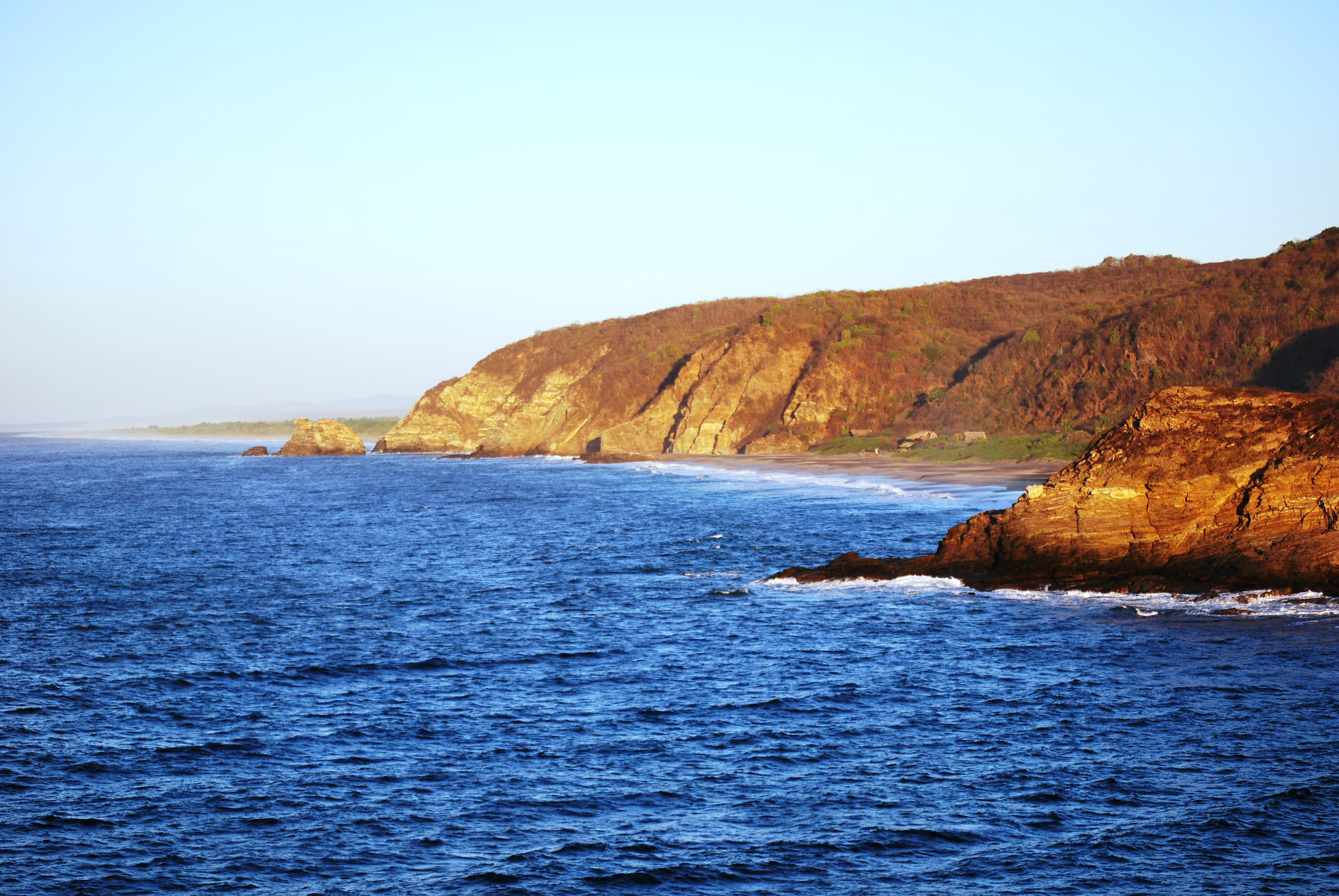
View of Punta Cometa, near Mazunte

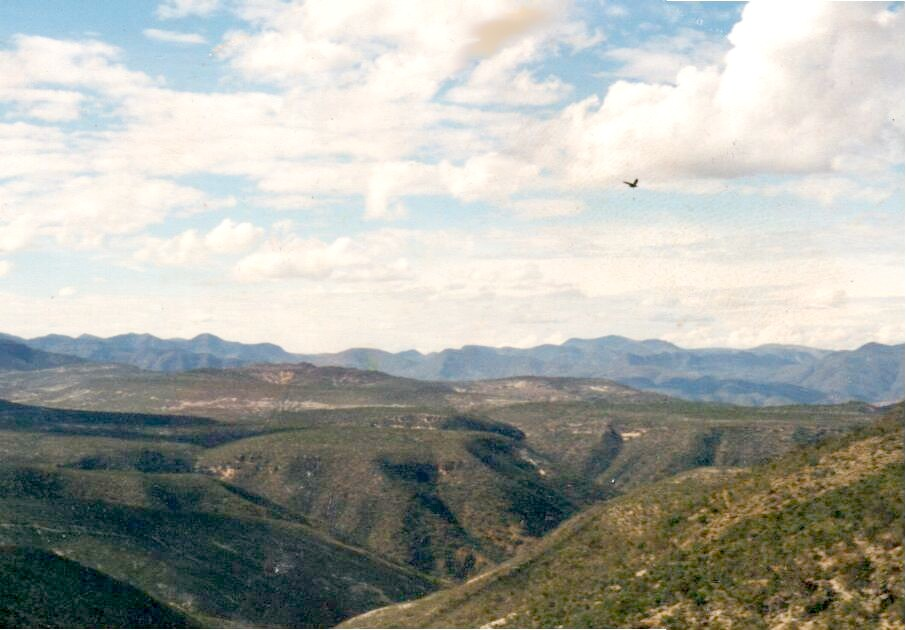
A view of the Sierra Mixteca region

The mountains are mostly formed by the convergence of the Sierra Madre del Sur, the Sierra Madre de Oaxaca and the Sierra Atravesada into what is called the Oaxaca Complex (Complejo Oaxaqueño). The Sierra Madre del Sur runs along the coast with an average width of 150 km (93 mi) and a minimum height of 2,000 meters (6,562 ft) asl with peaks over 2,500 m (8,202 ft) asl. In various regions the chain is locally known by other names, such as the Sierra de Miahuatlán and the Sierra de la Garza. The Sierra Madre de Oaxaca enters the state from the Puebla and Veracruz borders in the Tuxtepec region, running northwest to southeast towards the Central Valleys region, then onto the Tehuantepec area. Local names for parts of this range include Sierra de Tamazulapan, Sierra de Nochixtlan, Sierra de Huautla, Sierra de Juárez, Sierra de Ixtlan and others. Average altitude is 2,500 m (8,202 ft) asl with peaks over 3,000 m (9,843 ft) asl and width averages at about 75 km (47 mi). The Sierra Atravesada is a prolongation of the Sierra Madre de Chiapas. This range is not as high as the other two with an average elevation of just over 600 meters (1,969 ft). Most of it is located in the Juchitán district running east–west.

The only valleys of any real size are the Central Valleys between Etla and Miahuatlán, which contains the city of Oaxaca. Smaller populated valleys include Nochixtlan, Nejapa, Cuicatlan and Tuxtepec. Small mesas contain population centers such as Putla, Juxtlahuaca, Tamazulapan, Zacatepec, Tlaxiaco and Huajuapan. The largest canyons in the state are those in the Cuicatlán area and include the Cortés, Galicia and María in the municipality of Tlaxiaco. There are a very large number of small canyons as well as ravines and arroyos of all sizes.

The mountainous terrain allows for no navigable rivers; instead, there are a large number of smaller ones, which often change name from area to area. The continental divide passes through the state, meaning that there is drainage towards both the Gulf of Mexico and the Pacific Ocean. Most of the drainage towards the Gulf is represented by the Papaloapan and Coatzacoalcos Rivers and their tributaries such as the Grande and Salado Rivers. Three rivers account for most of the water headed for the Pacific: the Mixteco, Atoyac and Tehuantepec Rivers with their tributaries. Other important rivers and streams include the Tequisistlán, Santo Domingo, Putla, Minas, Puxmetacán-Trinidad, La Arena, Cajonos, Tenango, Tonto, Huamelula, San Antonio, Ayutla, Joquila, Copalita, Calapa, Colotepec, Aguacatenango-Jaltepec, Los Perros, El Corte, Espíritu Santo, Sarabia, Ostuta, Petapa and Petlapa.

=== Regions, districts and major communities ===
Regions and districts of Oaxaca

Major cities include Huajuapan de León, Juchitán de Zaragoza, Oaxaca (Oaxaca de Juárez), Puerto Escondido, Salina Cruz, San Pedro Pochutla, San Juan Bautista Cuicatlán, San Juan Bautista Tuxtepec, Santa Cruz Xoxocotlán, Santa Lucía del Camino, Santa María Asunción Tlaxiaco, Santiago Pinotepa Nacional and Tehuantepec (Santo Domingo Tehuantepec).

Regions and districts of Oaxaca are:

Region	District	Municipalities with 2005 populations over 19,000	Area (km^{2})	District population (2005)
Mixteca	Juxtlahuaca	Santiago Juxtlahuaca	1,848	72,176
Mixteca	Silacayoapam		1,822	30,300
Mixteca	Huajuapan	Huajuapan de León	3,270	122,760
Mixteca	Coixtlahuaca		1,666	9,018
Mixteca	Teposcolula		1,547	31,127
Mixteca	Tlaxiaco		2,711	105,775
Mixteca	Nochixtlán		2,799	55,821
Istmo	Juchitán	Juchitán de Zaragoza	14,392	339,445
Istmo	Tehuantepec	Salina Cruz; Tehuantepec	6,305	222,710
Cañada	Teotitlán	Huautla de Jiménez	2,212	144,534
Cañada	Cuicatlán		2,187	51,724
Papaloapan	Tuxtepec	San Juan Bautista Tuxtepec	5,496	393,595
Papaloapan	Choapan		2,987	44,346
Sierra Norte	Ixtlán		2,864	36,870
Sierra Norte	Villa Alta		1,156	29,009
Sierra Norte	Mixe	San Juan Cotzocon	4,930	96,920
Valles Centrales	Etla		2,221	117,207
Valles Centrales	Centro	Oaxaca; Santa Cruz Xoxocotlán; Santa Lucía del Camino; Santa María Atzompa	539	515,440
Valles Centrales	Zaachila	Villa de Zaachila	569	41,783
Valles Centrales	Zimatlán		988	51,738
Valles Centrales	Ocotlán	Ocotlán de Morelos	858	68,840
Valles Centrales	Tlacolula		3,324	107,653
Valles Centrales	Ejutla		963	40,985
Sierra Sur	Putla	Putla Villa de Guerrero	2,627	83,303
Sierra Sur	Sola de Vega		3,592	74,107
Sierra Sur	Miahuatlán	Miahuatlán de Porfirio Díaz	3,938	109,302
Sierra Sur	Yautepec		4,559	31,070
Costa	Jamiltepec	Pinotepa Nacional	4,293	170,249
Costa	Juquila	San Pedro Mixtepec (Puerto Escondido)	3,531	134,365
Costa	Pochutla	San Pedro Pochutla; Santa María Huatulco; Santa María Tonameca	3,773	174,649
			93,967	3,506,821

=== Climate ===
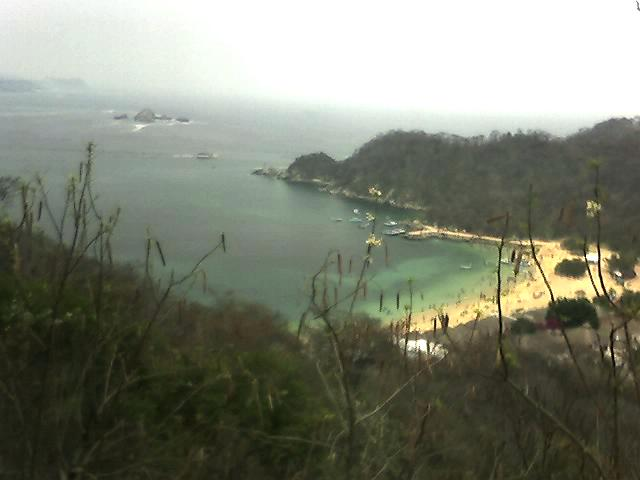
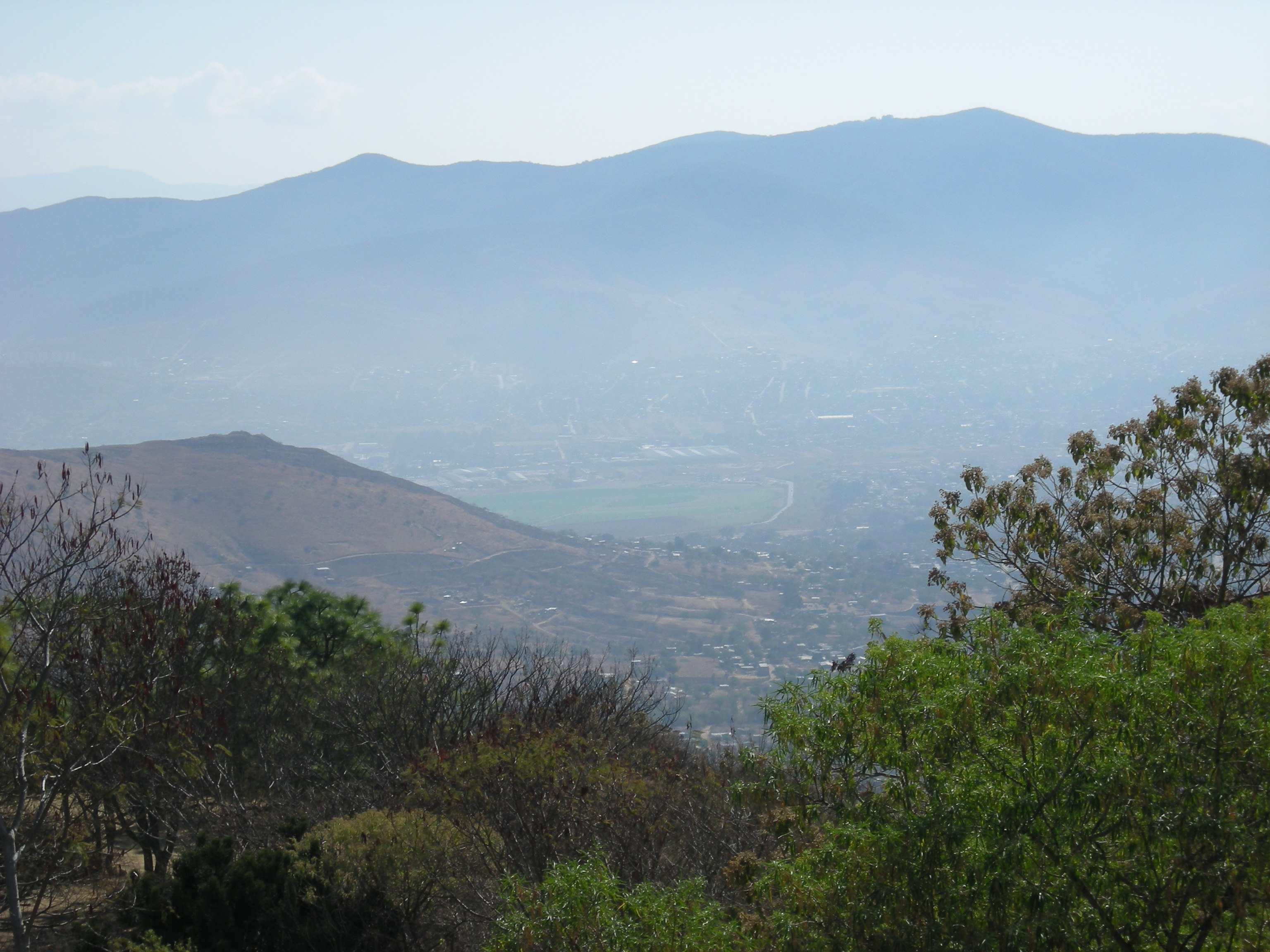

While the state is within the tropical latitudes, its climate varies with altitude. There are three principal climate regions in the state. The first is the hot and subtropical lands. This accounts for about 30% of the state. The next is the semi hot and semi humid regions which account for about 18%, and temperate and semi humid at about 16%. All of these climates experience a rainy season in the summer and early fall. As most of the state is over 2,000 m (6,562 ft) above sea level, average temperature is about 18 °C (64.4 °F), except near the coast. The coastline along with the regions of Yautepec, Putla, parts of Huahuapan and Silacayoapan are hot and relatively dry. Hot and humid climates predominate in Villa Alta, and the Central Valleys area and all others over 2,000 m (6,562 ft) above sea level have a temperate climate. A few of the highest peaks, such as those in Tehuantepec and Putla have a cold climate. Precipitation varies from between 430 to 2,700 mm (16.9 to 106.3 in) per year. The Sierra Mazteca, Textepec and other areas near the Veracruz border have rains year round. The rest of the state receives the majority of its rain during the summer and early fall. The higher elevations can experience freezing temperatures in December and January. The Chivela mountain pass in Isthmus of Tehuantepec provides a gap for the wind to pass between mountain ranges, creating the best conditions for wind power in Mexico.

=== Nature and conservation ===
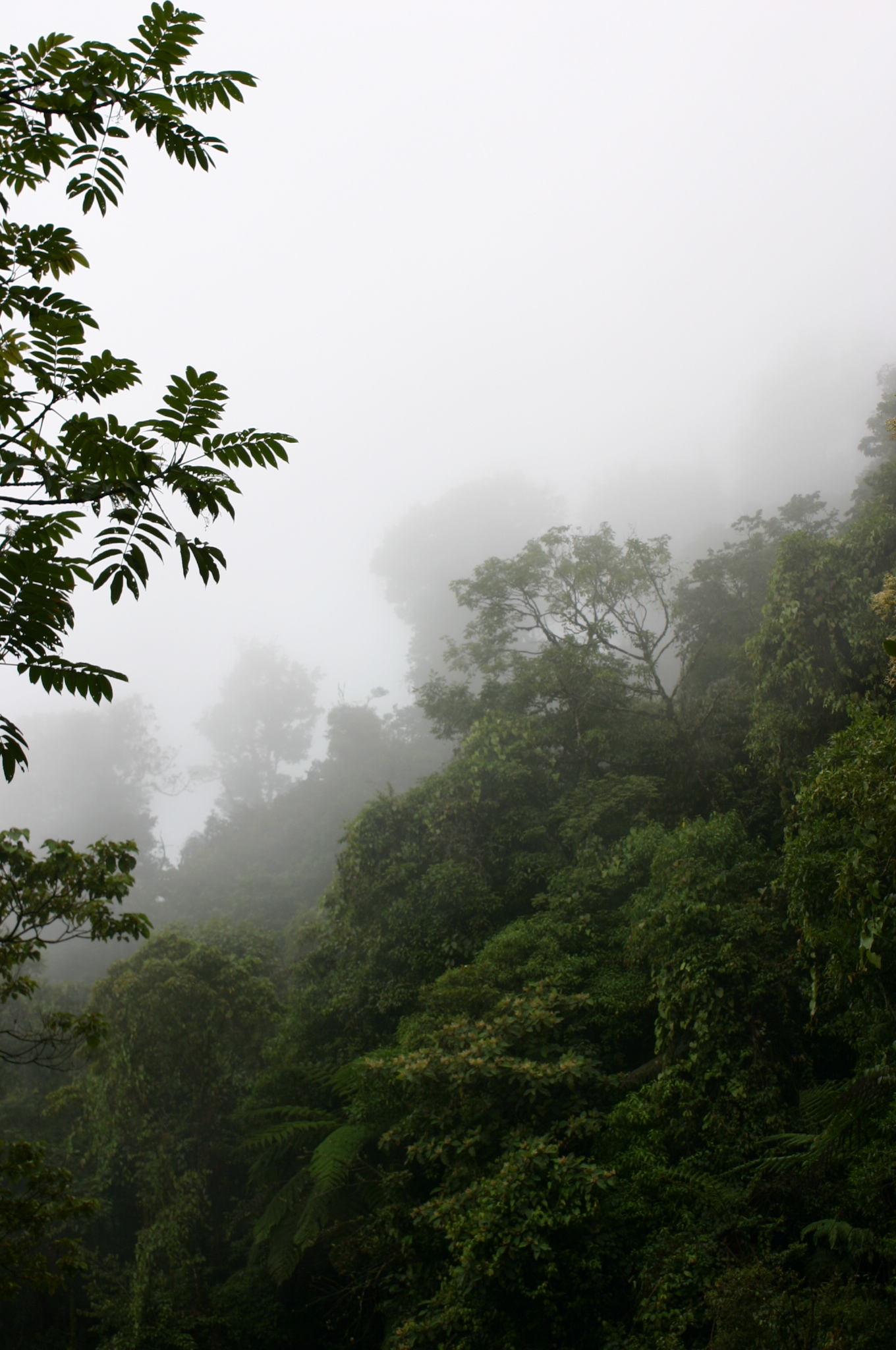
The conserved rainforest of Santiago Comaltepec, Oaxaca

Although it is the fifth-largest state in Mexico, it has the most biodiversity. There are more than 8,400 registered plant species, 738 bird species and 1,431 terrestrial vertebrate species, accounting for 50% of all species in Mexico. It is also among the five highest-ranking areas in the world for endangered species. The state has important ecological zones such as the Selva Zoque in the northeast. Vegetation varies from those adapted to hot and arid conditions such as cacti, to evergreen tropical forest on the coasts. Forests in the higher elevations consist of conifers, broadleafed trees and a mixture of the two. In the lower elevations by the coast there are evergreen and deciduous rainforest, with those dropping leaves doing so in the dry season. In the driest areas mesquite, some cactus and grasslands can be found. There are also 58 species of aquatic plants.

Wildlife includes a wide variety of birds, small to medium-sized mammals and some larger ones such as deer and wildcats, reptiles and amphibians. Off the coast there are fish and shellfish, as well as dolphins and whales which pass by during their migrations. The state is a prolific place for reptiles such as turtles, lizards, snakes and crocodiles. Of the 808 registered reptile species nationwide, 245 are found in the state. The state has the most amphibian species at 133, with one-third of all Mexican species of frogs and salamanders. It is home to 120 species of freshwater fish, 738 species of birds (70% of Mexico's total) and 190 species of mammals. Some insect forms such as grasshoppers, larvae and cochineal have economic importance for the state and there are several species of 'giant' stick insects indigenous to the region (such as Bacteria horni which has a body length of up to 22 cm). The most important ocean creatures commercially are shrimp, tuna, bonito, huachinango and mojarra. Sea turtles used to be exploited for both their meat and eggs but this was stopped by the federal government in the 1990s. The coast of Oaxaca is an important breeding area for sea turtles such as the leatherback (Dermochelys coriacea), which is classified as endangered throughout its global range. Despite conservation efforts starting in the 1970s, the number of nesting sites and nesting turtles has dramatically decreased.

Conservation efforts in the state are hampered by high marginalization, lack of economic alternatives, agricultural conflicts, change of land use (agricultural activities, fires), over-exploitation and pollution of natural water sources, inadequate forest management and illegal tree felling, unsustainable coastal tourist developments, climate change, limited local capacity, and limited local knowledge and valuation of natural resources. However, there are seven officially protected natural areas in the state: Benito Juárez National Park at 3,272 ha (8,090 acres), Huatulco National Park at 11,845 ha (29,270 acres), Lagunas de Chacahua National Park at 14,920 ha (36,900 acres), Playa de Escobilla Sanctuary at 30 ha (74 acres), Playa de la Bahía de Chacahua Sanctuary at 31 ha (77 acres), Tehuacán-Cuicatlán Biosphere Reserve at 490,678 ha (1,212,490 acres) and Yagul Natural Monument at 1,076 ha (2,660 acres).

A GEF-financed integrated landscape project, Conservación y Uso Sustentable de la Diversidad Biológica en Paisajes de Chiapas y Oaxaca (US$8 million), applies an integrated landscape approach that includes the Sierra Sur and the Isthmus of Oaxaca and the Pacific South Coast of Oaxaca and Chiapas; official planning documentation describes an intervention area of about 2.6 million hectares (26,000 km^{2}). Conservation International Mexico participates in the initiative alongside the National Commission of Natural Protected Areas (CONANP). Terms of reference for a regional ecological land-use programme for the Sierra Sur and Coast of Oaxaca cover 76 municipalities and include public consultation and consultation with Indigenous and Afro‑Mexican communities. Landscape restoration work in Oaxaca and Chiapas has also been presented under the Restauración de Paisajes Emblemáticos initiative, with a stated target of restoring 17,657 hectares (177 km^{2}) using approaches including assisted natural regeneration and agroforestry systems.

==== Lagunas de Chacahua National Park ====
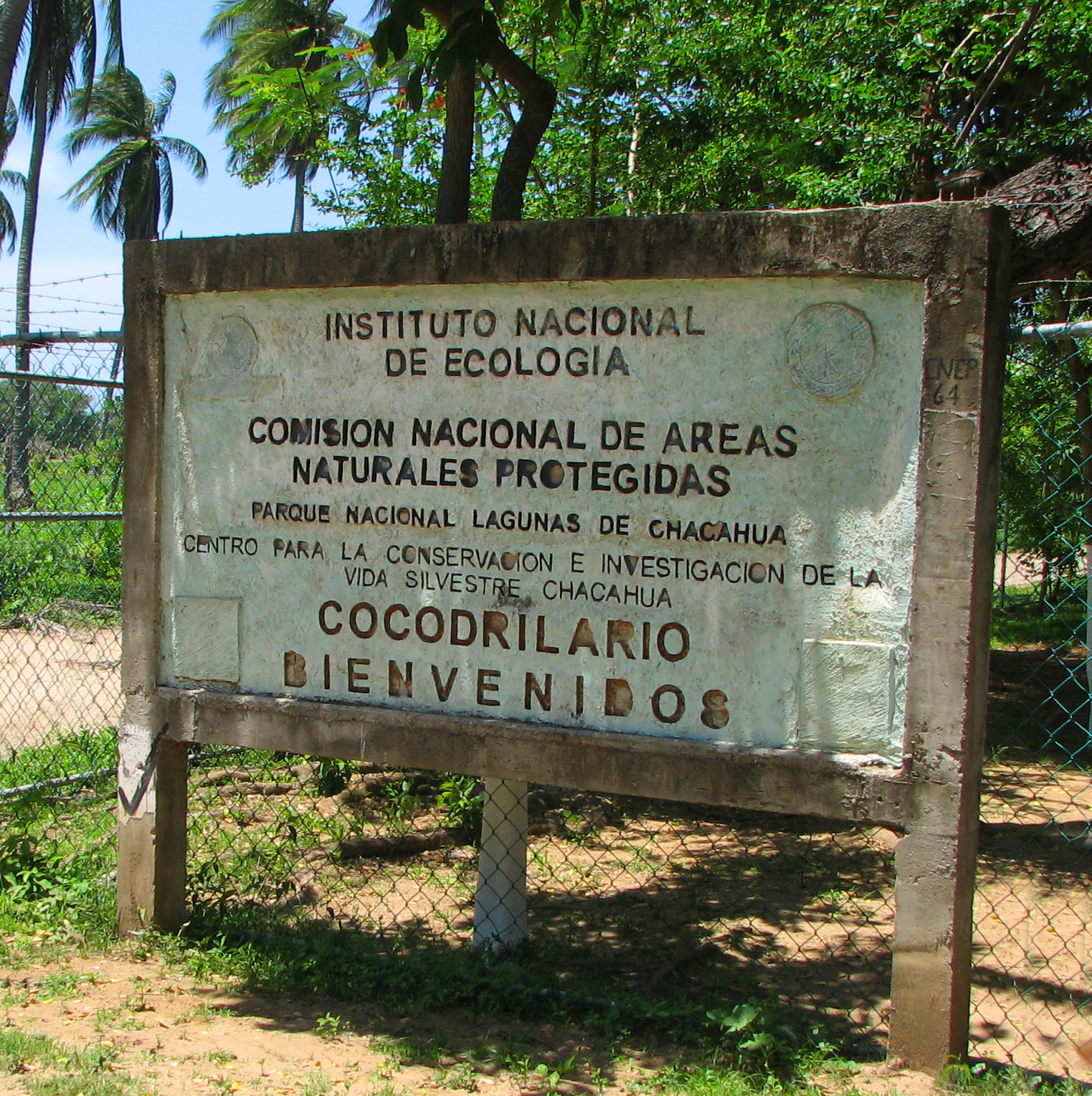
Entrance to the crocodile nursery located inside the Lagunas de Chacahua National Park

Lagunas de Chacahua National Park, created in 1937, lies about 54 km (34 mi) west of Puerto Escondido, near a village called Zapotalito. It can be reached via Federal Highway 200 or by boat from Puerto Escondido. The park encompasses 132.73 square kilometres (51.25 square miles), about 30 km^{2} (12 sq mi) of which is taken by various lagoons such as the Laguna de Chacahua, Laguna de La Pastoria, and Laguna Las Salinas. There are various smaller lagoons that are connected by narrow channels. The rest of the park consists of dry land.

The park has 10 different types of vegetation: "selva espinosa", swampland, deciduous, sub-tropical broadleaf, mangrove, savannah, "bosque de galleria", "tular", palm trees, and coastal dunes. 246 species of flowers and 189 species of animals have been documented so far in the park. Birds such as storks, herons, wild ducks, blue-winged teals, pelicans, and spoonbills can be found here. Three species of turtles also visit the park to lay their eggs.

==== Benito Juárez National Park ====
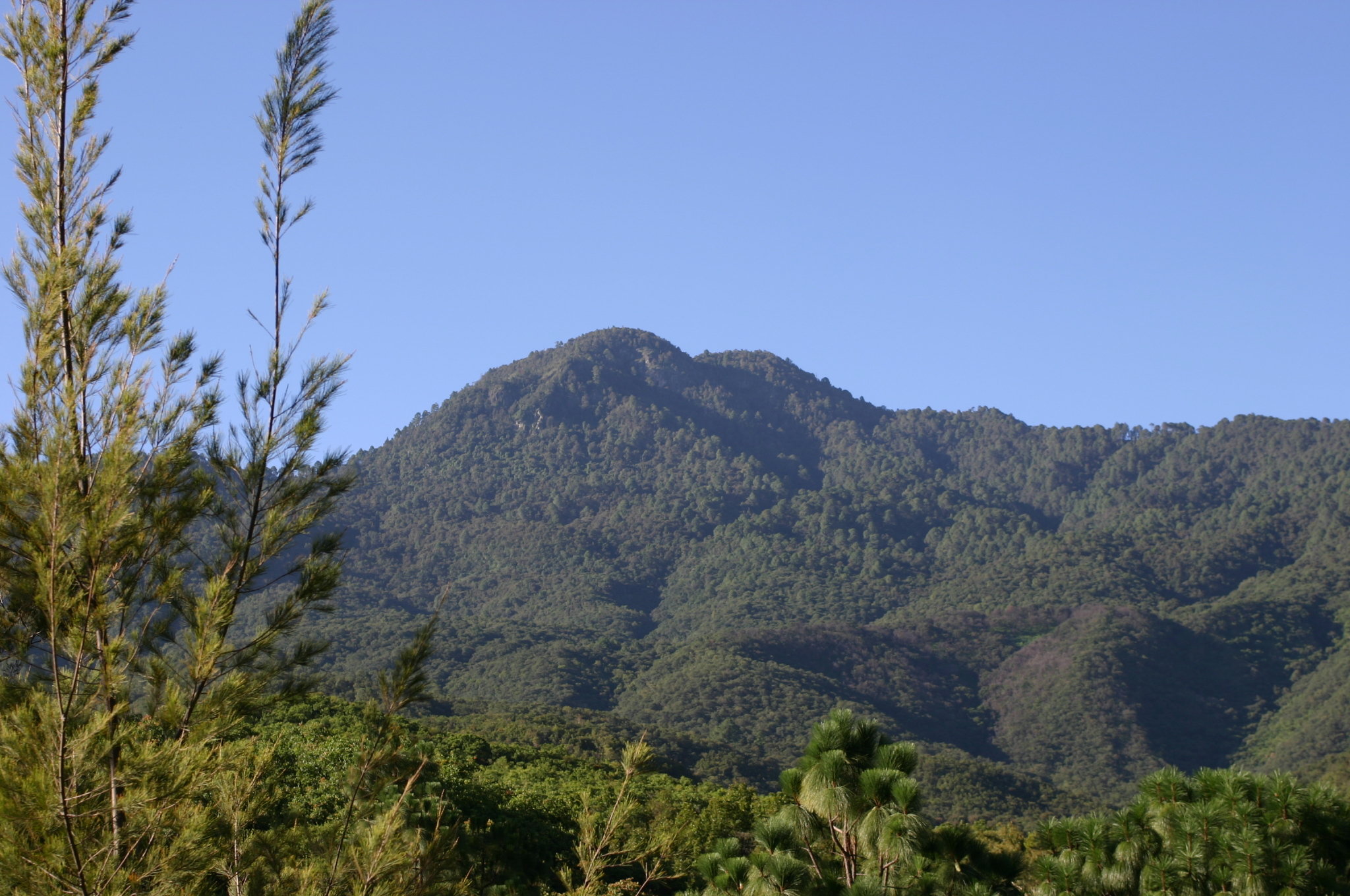
Cerro de San Felipe, Benito Juárez National Park

Benito Juárez National Park is located 5 km (3.1 mi) to the north of Oaxaca within the municipal limits of San Felipe del Agua and Donaji, Oaxaca, and San Andres Huayapan of the central district. It was designated as a national park under a presidential decree, in 1937. The topography of the park has an elevation range varying from 1,650 to 3,050 metres (5,413 to 10,007 feet) above sea level. The climate is Coastal sub-humid and Temperate sub-humid. The main rivers that flow through the park are the Huayapan and San Felipe rivers. Most of their flows used to be utilized to meet drinking water needs of Oaxaca through an aqueduct in the early part of the 18th century, during the colonial period. However, it is now tapped for water supply through piped system to the city. The park covers 2,737 hectares (6,760 acres), including the 3,111-meter (10,207 ft) high "Cerro de San Felipe" (San Felipe Mountain), part of the Sierra Madre de Oaxaca which has metamorphic rock formations. It has a rich biodiversity of flora and fauna. There are pine and oak forests in the upper reaches of the mountain, while the lower reaches have scrub oaks, and tropical deciduous forest in the canyons. Most of the forest is secondary growth, having been previously forested.

==== Huatulco National Park ====
Huatulco National Park, also known as Bahias de Huatulco National Park – Huatulco, was initially declared a protected area and later decreed as a National Park on July 24, 1998. Located in the Santa Maria Huatulco town, to the west of Cruz Huatulco, it extends to an area of 11,890 hectares (29,400 acres). In the low lands of the park, there 9,000 species of plant (about 50% of the species are reported throughout the country) in the forest and mangroves in the coastal belt. Fauna species have been identified as 264, which includes armadillos and white-tailed deer. Bird species are counted at 701, which include hummingbirds, pelicans and hawks. The amphibian and reptile species are counted to be 470, which include Black Iguana, salamanders and snakes. Dolphins, whales and turtles are sighted species off the coast line, out of the identified 100 marine species. Vegetation is dominated by the low forest growth of caducifolia in 80% area with the unusual feature of 50 ft (15.24 m) high trees.

==== Tehuacán-Cuicatlán Biosphere Reserve ====
Tehuacán-Cuicatlán Biosphere Reserve, which encompasses the states of Puebla and Oaxaca in Mexico, was established as reserve in 1998 covering an area of 490,187 ha (1,211,280 acres), with an altitudinal range of 600 to 2,950 m (1,969 to 9,678 ft). It is in the valley of the Tehuacán-Cuicatlán-Quiotepec. The six rivers which flow through the reserve are the Tomellín, Chiquito, Las Vueltas, Salado, Zapotitán and Río Grande of the Papaloapan watershed, which finally flow into the Gulf of Mexico. On account of wide variation in topography and annual rainfall, the micro-climatic conditions in the reserve has created a biosphere reserve, which is very rich in flora and fauna. The rich biodiversity of the preserve consists of 910 plant genus, 2,700 vascular species, 102 species of mammals, 356 species of birds which includes the endangered Green Macaw (Ara militaris), and 53 species of reptiles. However, the reserve is faced with threats from poaching, deforestation, overgrazing, and trash scattered on the highways and secondary roads that pass close and through the reserve. Inadequate patrolling staff is an issue which needs to be addressed to remove the threats to the biosphere reserve.

== Demographics ==
=== Largest cities ===
Largest cities or towns in Oaxaca Source:
Rank		Municipality	Pop.
1	Oaxaca de Juárez	Oaxaca de Juárez	258,913
2	San Juan Bautista Tuxtepec	San Juan Bautista Tuxtepec	103,609
3	Juchitán de Zaragoza	Juchitán de Zaragoza	88,280
4	Santa Cruz Xoxocotlán	Santa Cruz Xoxocotlán	81,848
5	Salina Cruz	Salina Cruz	76,660
6	Huajuapan de León	Huajuapan de León	56,163
7	Santa Lucía del Camino	Santa Lucía del Camino	45,895
8	Santo Domingo Tehuantepec	Tehuantepec	45,134
9	Santiago Pinotepa Nacional	Pinotepa Nacional	33,726
10	Loma Bonita	Loma Bonita	31,469

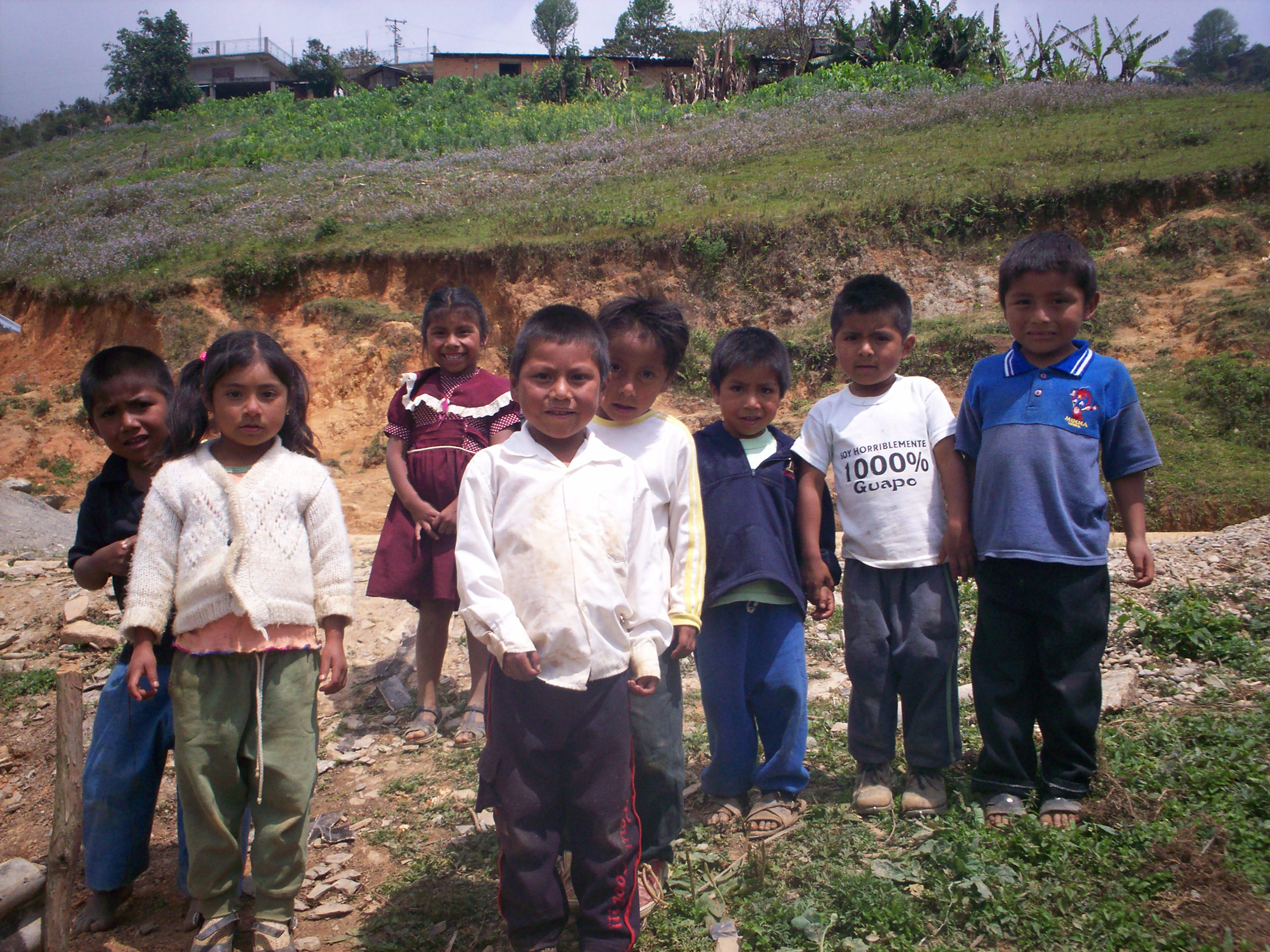
Mazateco children

=== Overview ===
The state has a total population of about 3.5 million, with women outnumbering men by 150,000 and about 60% of the population under the age of 30. It is ranked tenth in population in the country. Fifty three percent of the population lives in rural areas. Most of the state's population growth took place between 1980 and 1990. Life expectancy is 71.7 for men and 77.4 for women, just under the national average. Births far outpace deaths. In 2007, there were 122,579 births and 19,439 deaths. Approximately 85% profess the Catholic faith.

=== Indigenous peoples ===
Demographically, Oaxaca stands out due to its high percentage of indigenous peoples. It is estimated that at least a third are speakers of indigenous languages (with 50% not able to speak Spanish), accounting for 53% of Mexico's total indigenous language speaking population. The state straddles two Mesoamerican cultural areas. The first extends into the state from the Mayan lands of Chiapas, Yucatán, and Guatemala. The central and northwest of the state is part of the cultures of the Valley of Mexico, with historical influence seen from ancient cities such as Teotihuacan, Tula, and Tenochtitlan.

The main reason that indigenous languages and cultures have been able to survive here is the rugged terrain, which isolates communities. This also has the effect of dividing the state into small secluded communities, which have developed independently over time. There are 16 ethnolinguistic groups recognized by the Instituto Nacional Indigenista who maintained their individual languages, customs and traditions well into the colonial period and to some extent to the present day. However, some studies put the number of cultures in the state as high as 4,000. This makes Oaxaca the most ethnically complex of Mexico's 31 states.

The most populous indigenous groups in Oaxaca are the Zapotec and the Mixtec people. Several other languages of the Oto-Manguean languages are spoken in Oaxaca: The Triques, Amuzgos, and Cuicatecs are linguistically most closely related to the Mixtecs, The languages of the Chocho, Popoloca and Ixcatec peoples are most closely related to that of the Mazatecs. The Chatino languages are grouped with the Zapotecan branch of Oto-Manguean. The languages of the Zoque and Mixe peoples belong to the Mixe–Zoquean languages. Other ethnic groups include the Chontalees, Chinantecs, the Huaves, and Nahuas. As of 2005, a total of 1,091,502 people were counted as speaking an indigenous language.

A 2019 genetic study sampling 636 people from Oaxaca found a predominance of Indigenous genetic ancestry, with an average of 73.1% Indigenous ancestry, 17.4% European, and 9.5% African ancestry in the general population of the state, regardless of ethnic group.

==== Zapotecs ====
The largest indigenous group in the state are the Zapotecs at about 350,000 people or about 31% of the total indigenous population. The Zapotec have an extremely long history in the Central Valleys region and unlike other indigenous groups, do not have a migration story. For them, they have always been here. Zapotecs have always called themselves Be'ena'a, which means The Cloud People. Zapotec territory extends in and around the Central Valleys region of the state, around the capital city of Oaxaca. The Zapotec language has historically been and is still the most widely spoken in the state, with four dialects that correspond to the four subdivisions of these people: Central Valleys and Isthmus, the Sierra de Ixtlan, Villa Alta and Coapan. Zapotec communities can be found in 67 municipalities. The various Zapotec dialects account for 64 of the total 173 still surviving forms of Oto-Manguean.

==== Mixtecs ====
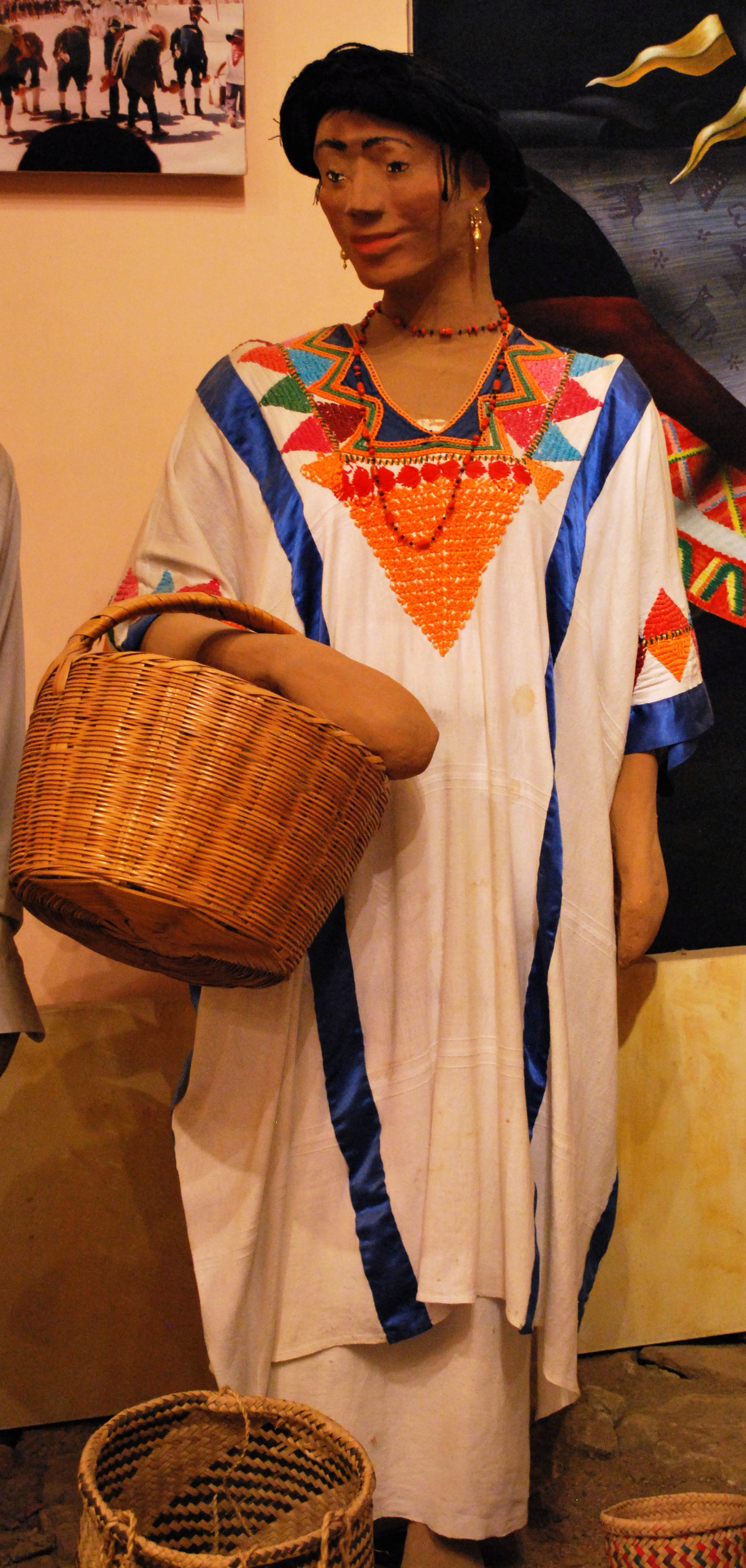
Wax mannequin of woman in Mixtec dress

The second largest group are the Mixtecs at just over 240,000 people or 27% of the indigenous population. These people established themselves in the northwest of Oaxaca and far southern Puebla over 3,000 years ago, making them one of the oldest communities in the region. These same people put pressure on the Zapotec kingdoms until the Spanish conquered both peoples in the 16th century. Mixtec territory is divided into three sub regions. The Mixteca Alta (Upper Mexteca) covers 38 municipalities and is the most populated region. The Mixteca Baja (Lower Mixteca) includes 31 municipalities. The Coastal Mixtecs are a small group. Today, the Mixtecs call themselves Ñuu Savi, the people of the rain. The Mixtecan language family, as one of the largest and most diverse families in the Oto-Manguean group, includes three groups of languages: Mixtec, Cuicatec, and Trique.

==== Mazatecos ====
The Mazatecos number at about 165,000 or 15% of Oaxaca's indigenous population. These people occupy the northernmost area of the state, in the upper Sierra Madre Oriental mountains and the Papaloapan Basin. The Mazatecos call themselves Ha shuta enima, which means People of Custom. Some historians believe that the Mazatecos descend from the Nonoalca-Chichimecas, who migrated south from Tula early in the 12th century. While most live in Oaxaca, a significant number of Mazatecos also occupy Veracruz and Puebla.

The Chinantecos account for about 10% of Oaxaca's indigenous people, numbering at about 104,000. They inhabit the Chinantla region of north central Oaxaca near the border of Veracruz. The Chinanteco language has as many as 14 different dialects and is part of the Oto-Manguean linguistic group. Historians believe that those living in this region struggled to maintain their independence against sudden and numerous attacks by the Zapotecs, Mixtecs, Mixes and Aztecs. The latter, led by Moctezuma I, finally conquered the Chinantla region during the 15th century.

==== Mixe ====
The Mixe people account for another 10% of the indigenous population at just over 103,000 people. The Mixe are an isolated group in the northeastern part of the state, close to the border of Veracruz. Their region includes 19 municipalities and 108 communities. The Mixes call themselves Ayuuk, which means The People. It is unknown where the Mixe migrated from, with some speculating from as far as Peru, but they arrived in waves from 1300 to 1533. They came into conflict with the Mixtecs and Zapotecs, but allied themselves with the Zapotecs against the Aztecs, then resisted the Spanish. The Mixe language has seven dialects and this group has the highest rate of monolingualism (36% of speakers in the year 2000) of any Indigenous group in Mexico.

==== Other ====
Minorities include the Chatino (42,477), the Trique (18,292), the Huave people (15,324), the Cuicatecos (12,128), the Zoque, also called the Aiyuuk (roughly 10,000), the Amuzgos (4,819), the Chontales of Oaxaca (4,610), the Tacuates (1,725), the Chocho or Chocholtec (524), the Ixcatecos (207), the Popolocas (61) and a small population of Nahuatl speaking peoples in the border area with Puebla.

=== Afro-Mexicans ===
According to the 2020 Census, 4.71% of Oaxaca's population identified as Black, Afro-Mexican, or of African descent, which is the second highest percentage of any Mexican state.

=== Religion ===
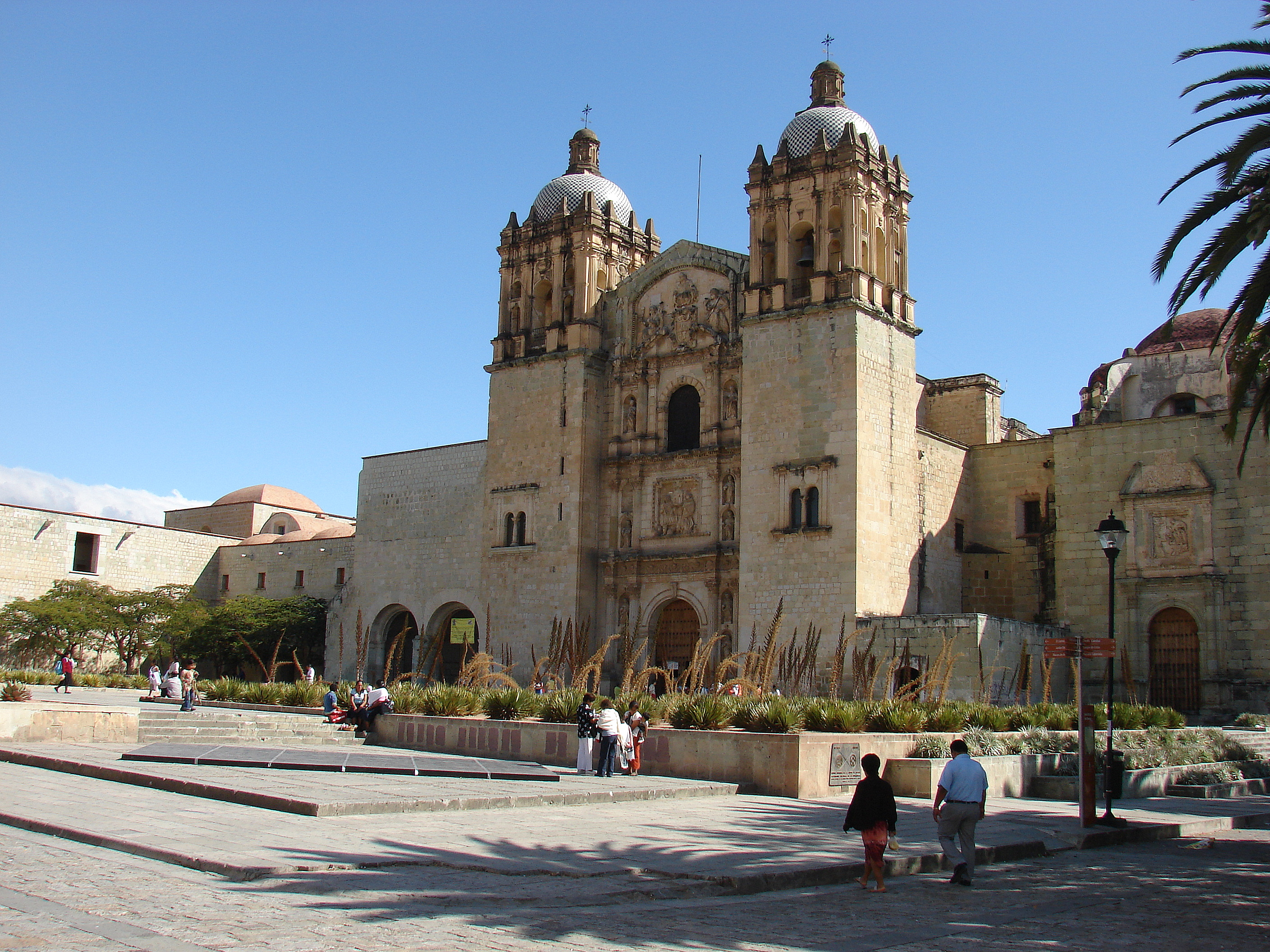
Church of Santo Domingo de Guzmán

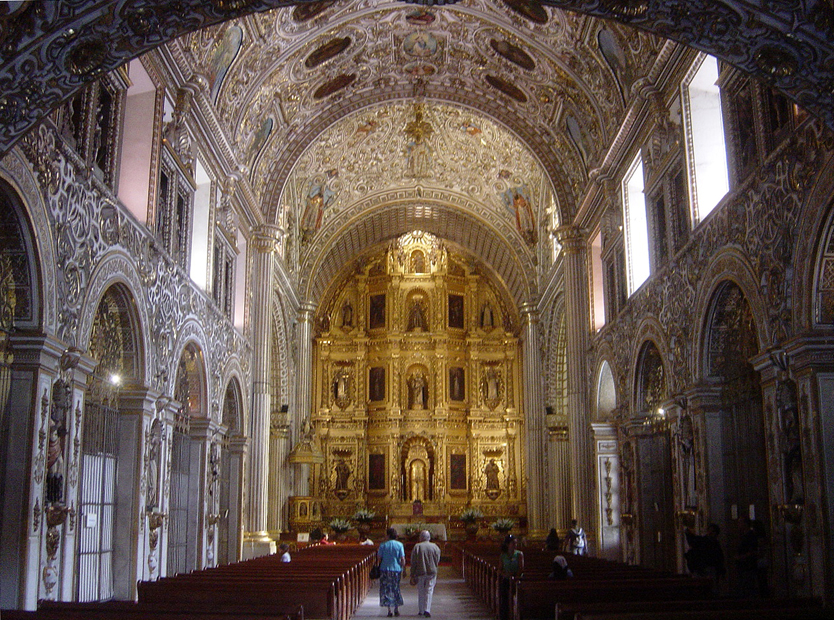
Interior of the Church of Santo Domingo de Guzmán

Ritualistitic and shamanic religious practices were prevalent in Oaxaca valley, until the Spanish invaded the valley in 1521. Proselytism was also started in 1521, Christianity was ushered into the valley and eventually took firm roots.

The ancient religious practices have been dated by archaeological findings (over a 15 years period of excavations by two Archaeologists of the University of Michigan) to be more than 7,000 years old. Initially, 7,000 years ago, the people were "hunters and gatherers with no fixed abode". With development of agricultural practices, with maize as the main crop and settled villages getting established over several centuries, a warrior type of societal culture evolved by 500 BC, with the Zapotec state getting into shape. Concurrently, ceremonious religious practices with ritualistic and shamanistic dancing around stone marked floors came to be observed (a pre-Zapotec dance floor dated to 6650 BC testifies this). Even cannibalistic practices were noted. The ritualistic practices were formalized, as permanent settlements were established, and temples were built to perform the rituals as per a set of calendar annual events. There were two interconnected calendars prevalent at the time- one of 260 days and another of 365 days, which synchronized every 52 years. In subsequent years, as upper strata of society (an "elite class") came into existence, the religious practices and the temple got more formalized with priests controlling the community's religion. Religion started to evolve around the ritualistic practices but with more defined role of religion under the monarchic rule which came into effect along with "the religious systems that were the previous source of social authority". Monte Alban was founded around 500 BCE. It is inferred that from 1500 BC, Zapotec society evolved as an organized "autonomous ascribed-status peasant societies". The ritual buildings in the valley dated to this period testify this observation. Richard Sosis, an anthropologist at the University of Connecticut has summarised the archaeological findings with the observation:

the Michigan archaeologists' study delineated the process of religion adapting to different environments as Oaxacan society changed. Among foragers, ritual serves to cement solidarity, he said, and the "powerful moralistic gods that we associate with contemporary religions" are a later development, introduced at the stage when priests have acquired control of a religion and "are effectively controlling the masses through ritual activities that instill the fear of supernatural punishment.

When Christianity made inroads into the Valley in 1521, the valley was part of the Aztec tribute empire with Tenochtitlan as the capital (present day Mexico City) and Spanish settlements came into existence to exploit the rich land and mineral resources of the valley. The first record of Baptism in the valley was that of the King of Teozapotlan, the most important Valley ruler, in 1521. He was baptized as Don Juan Cortes. Nobles, who converted to Christianity, were permitted to keep their traditional rights under a 1557 order by Philip II of Spain. Spaniards pursued proselytisation activity with dedicated single-minded devotion throughout the 18th century with the "goal of saving the souls of their subjects".

Now, in Mexico, Roman Catholics are 89% of the total population. Only 47% of Oaxacan Catholics attend church services weekly, one of the lowest rates of the developing world. In absolute terms, Mexico has the world's second largest number of Catholics after Brazil. While most indigenous Mexicans are at least nominally Catholic, some combine or syncretize Catholic practices with native traditions.

The National Presbyterian Church in Mexico has a relatively high percentage of followers in Oaxaca, one of its stronger states.

== Government and political geography ==
Map marking the numerous municipalities of Oaxaca. Oaxaca de Juárez is highlighted.

The state was created by a federal decree in 1824, and is the fifth largest state in Mexico. The state government consists of an executive branch, headed by the governor, a unicameral legislature and a judiciary branch headed by a state supreme court presided over by seven judges.

The area of Oaxaca has been divided into small entities since far back into the pre-Hispanic period. Much of the reason for this is the highly mountainous geography, although the occupation of the area by numerous ethnicities is a factor as well. The area resisted large scale Spanish domination through the colonial era, and maintained local traditions and customs better than other areas of Mexico. Even today, the state has far more municipalities and semi autonomous local authorities than any other state in the nation. Oaxaca is divided into 570 municipalities, about one-quarter of the total of the country. Many of the municipalities of the state had been ill-defined from colonial times until the 1990 INEGI survey which delineated them with exact coordinates. The most populated municipality is the capital, followed by San Juan Bautista Tuxtepec and Juchitán de Zaragoza. There is also a system of thirty districts to group municipalities.

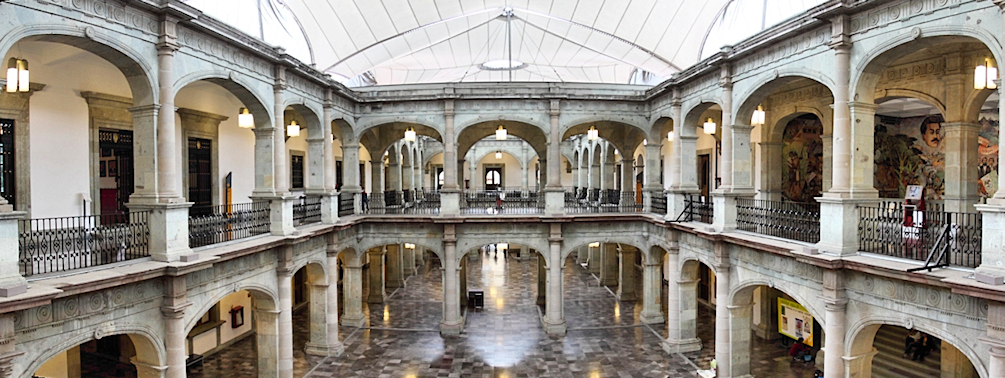
Interior view of the old Oaxaca Government Palace and Capitol Building, which now houses the state museum

The state has traditionally been divided into seven regions, which took into account variables such as ethnic makeup, economics and geography. Today, the state is divided into eight regions called Valles Centrales, La Cañada, La Mixteca, Sierra Madre del Sur, Sierra Norte, El Istmo, La Costa and El Golfo. These still take into account the traditional variables, but geography plays a larger role. La Cañada Region comprises the fourth and fifth districts with a total of 45 municipalities. The Coast Region consists of the 21st, 22nd and 30th districts with a total of 50 municipalities; the Isthmus Region consists of the 28th and 29th districts with a total of 41 municipalities; the Mixteca Region consists of the 1st, 2nd, 3rd, 8th, 9th, 10th and 16th districts with a total of 155 municipalities; the Papaloapam Region consists of the 6th and 7th districts with a total of 20 municipalities; the Sierra Sur Region consists of the 15th, 23rd, 26th and 27th districts with 70 municipalities; the Sierra North Region consists of the 12th, 13th and 14th districts with 69 municipalities; the Central Valleys Regions consists of the 11th, 17th, 18th, 19th, 20th, 24th and 25th districts with 121 municipalities.

== Economy ==
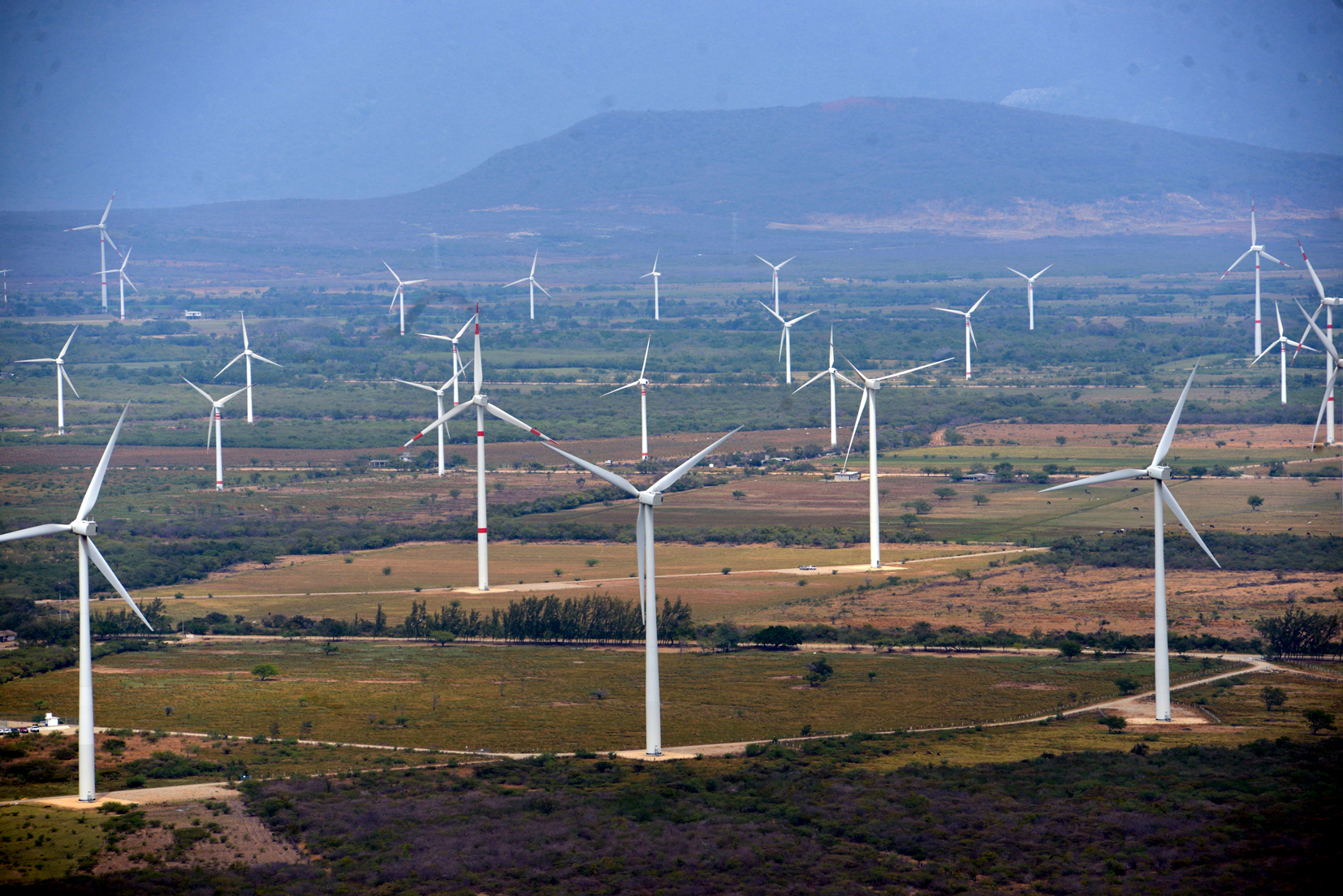
The Central Eólica Sureste I, Fase II in Asunción Ixtaltepec. The Isthmus of Tehuantepec is the region of Mexico with the highest capacity for wind energy.

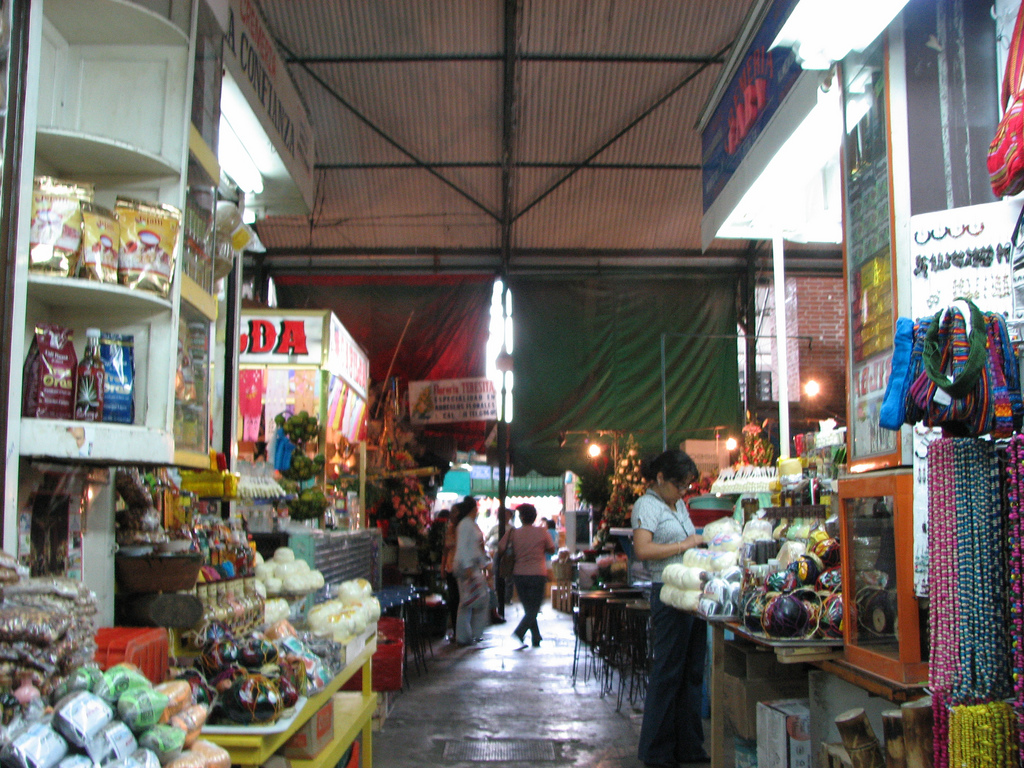
Benito Juárez Market, Oaxaca

According to the Mexican government agency Conapo (National Population Council), Oaxaca is the third most economically marginalized state in Mexico. The state has 3.3% of the population but produces only 1.5% of the GNP. The main reason for this is the lack of infrastructure and education, especially in the interior of the state outside of the capital. Eighty percent of the state's municipalities do not meet federal minimums for housing and education. Most development projects are planned for the capital and the surrounding area. Little has been planned for the very rural areas and the state lacks the resources to implement them. The largest sector of Oaxaca's economy is agriculture, mostly done communally in ejidos or similar arrangements. About 31% of the population is employed in agriculture, about 50% in commerce and services and 22% in industry. The commerce sector dominates the gross domestic product at 65.4%, followed by industry/mining at 18.9% and agriculture at 15.7%.

=== Migration ===
In 45.5% of Oaxaca's municipalities, the population has declined due to migration. Poverty and migration are caused mostly by the lack of economic development in the state, which leaves most of the population working in the least productive sector. This has led to wide scale migration, mostly from the rural areas, to find employment. Within Oaxaca, many people leave rural villages to work in the city of Oaxaca, the Papaloapan area and the coast. Within Mexico, many leave for Mexico City, Mexico State, Sinaloa, Baja California and Baja California Sur. Most of those leaving the state are agricultural workers. As of 2005, over 80,000 people from Oaxaca state live in some other part of Mexico. Most of those leaving Oaxaca and Mexico go to the United States. Much of the current wave of emigration began in the late 1970s, and by the 1980s Oaxaca ranked 8th in the number of people leaving for the US from Mexico. Today, that percentage has fallen to 20th. Most of those migrate to the United States, concentrated in California and Illinois. In 2007, estimates of the number of Oaxacans residing in Los Angeles, California ranged from 50,000 to 250,000.

=== Agriculture ===
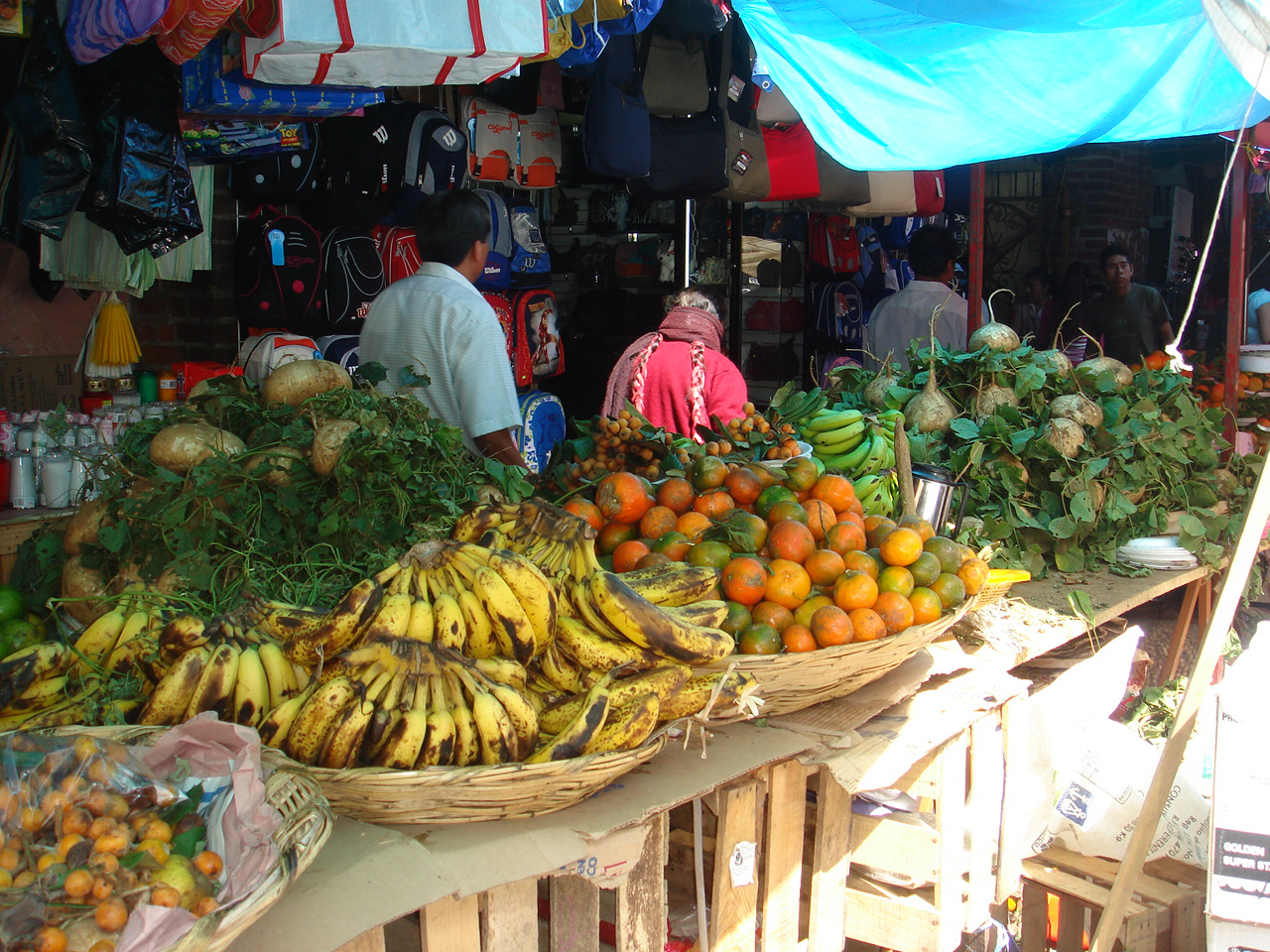
A market in Oaxaca

The economy of Oaxaca is based on agriculture, especially in the interior of the state. Only 9% of the territory is suitable for agriculture due to the mountainous terrain, so there are limits to this sector. The production of food staples, such as corn and beans, is mostly for internal consumption but this production cannot meet demand. The total agricultural production of the state was estimated at 13.4 million tons with a value of 10,528 million pesos in 2007. As of 2000, 1,207,738 hectares are used for the raising of crops, most of which occurs during the annual rainy season, with only 487,963 having crops growing year round. Only 81,197 hectares have irrigation. The variation of climate allows for a wider range of agricultural crops than would otherwise grow in a geographical region of this size. Oaxaca is the nation's second highest producer of grains and agave. It is third in the production of peanuts, mango and sugar cane. It is the second largest producer of goat meat, providing about 10% of the national total. In the more temperate areas crops such as corn, beans, sorghum, peanuts, alfalfa and wheat are grown. In more tropical areas, crops also include coffee, sesame seed, rice, sugar cane and pineapple.

Livestock is raised on 3,050,106 hectares or 32% of the state's land. Cattle dominate in the Tuxtepec, Isthmus and Coast regions, with pigs dominating in higher elevations such as the Central Valleys Region. Other animals include sheep, goats, domestic fowl and bees. The value of this production was estimated at 2,726.4 million pesos with cattle comprising over half of this. Coffee is grown in mountain areas near the Pacific Ocean in municipalities such as Santa María Huatulco, Pluma Hidalgo, Candelaria Loxicha, San Miguel del Puerto and San Mateo Piñas. The growing of coffee here dates back to the 17th and 18th centuries when English pirates introduced the plant. Coastal fishing is also a major source of income and in 2007 the total fishing catch was estimated at 9,300 tons with a value of over 174 million pesos.

=== Mining and industry ===
Mining has traditionally been important to the economy and history. Hernán Cortés sought and received the title of the Marquis of the Valley of Oaxaca in order to claim mineral and other rights. Currently coal, salt, chalk, petroleum, marble, lime, graphite, titanium, silver, gold and lead are still extracted. Most mines today are located in Etla, Ixtlán, San Pedro Taviche, Pápalo and Salina Cruz. There is an oil and natural gas refinery in Salina Cruz, which provides products to the state and other areas on Mexico's Pacific coast.

=== Commerce ===
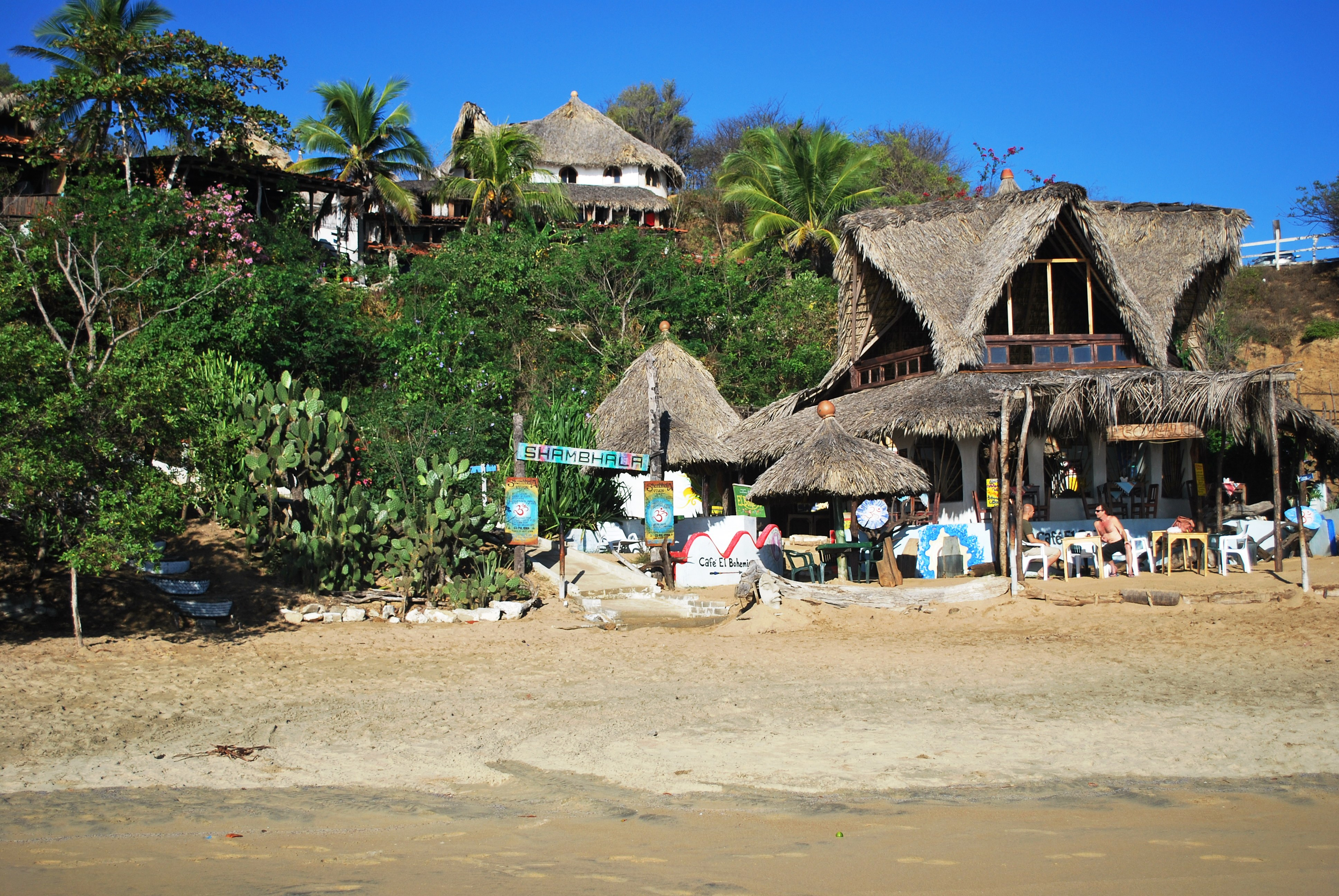
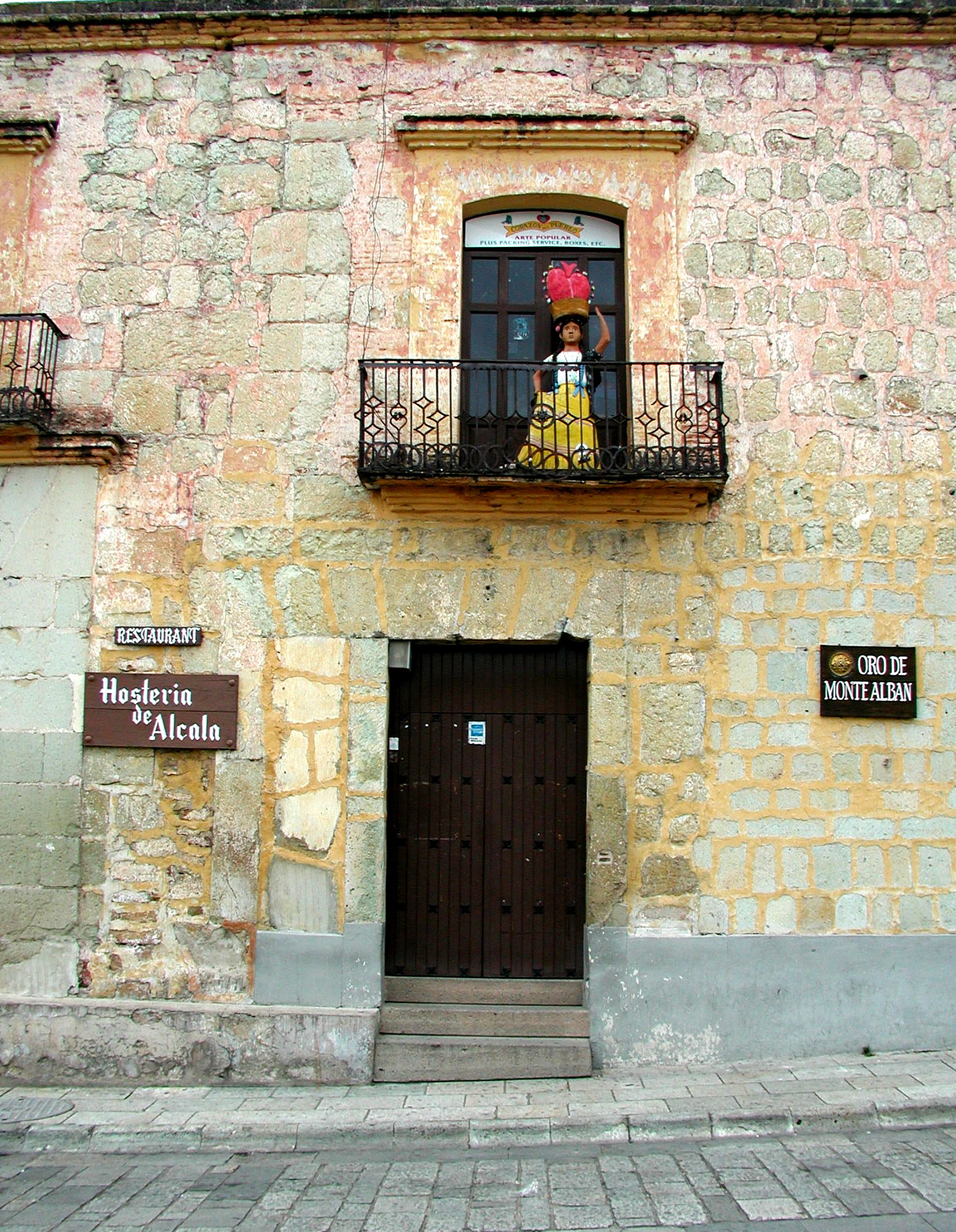
Left: Shambala Hotel at Zipolite Beach. Right: Hosteria de Alcala, Oaxaca city.

Tourism is important to the state as it is the only sector that is growing and brings substantial income from outside the state, although most tourism is concentrated in the capital and along the coast. In 2007, there were 1,927 small grocery stores, 70 tianguis and 167 municipal markets. Tourism accounts for about 30% of the commerce sector of Oaxaca's economy. The state attracts visitors from Mexico and abroad. The state government has been pushing this sector heavily as a means of growing the economy, with major infrastructure projects such as the Oaxaca-Puerto Escondido-Huatulco highway (scheduled to finish in 2018) and the Iberdrola hydroelectric dam.

In 2000, there were 612 hotels with 15,368 rooms. Thirteen of these were classed as five stars. The state received 1,564,936 visitors that year, over 80% of whom were from Mexico. The Central Valleys region receives the most visitors (60%), followed by the La Mixteca and Papaloapan regions (29%) and the coast (11%), in spite of the fact that only 7% of the state's attractions are in the Oaxaca city area. One reason for this is that the city of Oaxaca is only four and a half hours away from Mexico City via the federal highway.

== Transport ==
=== Road, rail and sea ===
The state has a total of 18,933.4 km (11,764.7 mi) of roadways. Most of these roadways are in the Papaloapam, Mixteca, Isthmus and Coast Regions. The primary highways in the state include Oaxaca (city)-Cuacnopalan toll road and the Pan-American highway, which crosses the state completely from Puebla to Chiapas. Federal highway 200 hugs the coast connecting communities such as Puerto Escondido, Salinas Cruz and Huatulco with Acapulco and Chiapas. Federal highway 185, also called "Transístmica", crosses the state from the Veracruz border to the coast at Salina Cruz. Federal highway 125 runs from the Puebla state line along the western part of the state. Federal highway 135 leads from Puebla to Oaxaca City then down to Pochutla. Federal highway 175 runs from the Veracruz border to the city of Oaxaca. Other highways include Federal highway 147 and Federal highway 182.

There is a railroad line connecting the city of Oaxaca with Mexico City for cargo. The state's major port is Salina Cruz which primarily services ships belonging to PEMEX, bringing crude oil and refined petroleum products along the Mexican coast as well as the United States and Japan. There is also a railroad from Salina Cruz to Veracruz and to Tapachula.

=== Air ===
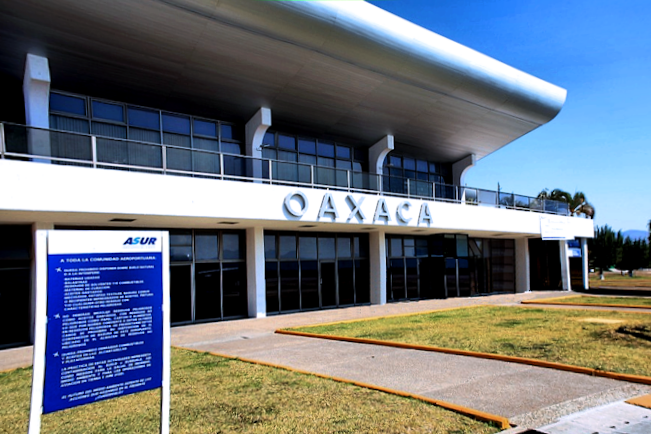
Xoxocotlán International Airport.

Oaxaca-Xoxocotlan Airport (IATA code OAX) is approximately 7 km (4.3 mi) south of Oaxaca city centre. This airport has a runway that measures 2,450 metres (8,038 feet) and a total extension of 435 hectares (1,070 acres) with two hangars. According to figures published by Grupo Aeroportuario del Sureste (ASUR), the airport received 523,104 passengers in 2009. Airlines that fly to the state include Aeroméxico, Volaris, Interjet, and VivaAerobus arriving from Mexico City, Cancun, Guadalajara, Monterrey, and Tijuana. In addition the airport also has nonstop flights to the US thru United Airlines and American Airlines to Houston and Dallas.

=== Local transportation services ===
Local public transportation is offered various local business using pickup trucks, buses and small cargo trucks.(eumed) Oaxaca city has separate first class and second class bus stations, offering services to most places within the state of Oaxaca, including the coastal resorts of Huatulco, Puerto Escondido, Puerto Ángel and Pinotepa Nacional, and also long-distance services to Puebla and Mexico City and other Mexican locations such as Veracruz. Intercity bus services is provided by companies such as ADO, Cristòbal Colòn, SUR, Fletes y Pasajes and AU. Smaller providers provide service in vans, especially between the city of Oaxaca and the coast. These operators have existed only semi-legally in the past but legal issues have since been resolved.

== Media ==
Newspapers of Oaxaca include: El Imparcial de Oaxaca, El Imparcial del Istmo, Noticias, Voz e Imagen de Oaxaca, and Tiempo de Oaxaca.

== Culture ==
=== Arts ===
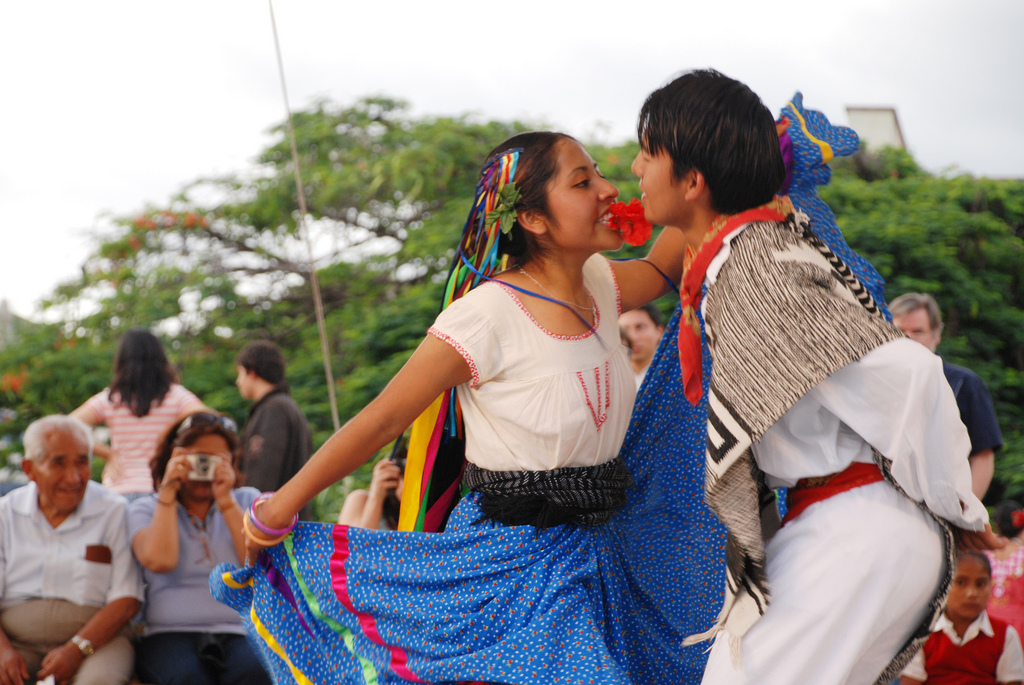
Two young people dancing a jarabe

Since the late 20th century, the state has produced several notable painters, including Rufino Tamayo, Rodolfo Nieto, Rodolfo Morales, and Francisco Toledo. These four painters have been influential in establishing new art movements in the state. These movements have spurred exhibitions, galleries, museums, and schools such as the Museo de Arte Contemporaneo (MACO) and Instituto de Artes Gráficas de Oaxaca (IAGO). Many of today's artists from Oaxaca have been inspired by past indigenous paintings as well as the colonial era works of Miguel Cabrera.

Following the 2006 political uprising, multiple printmaking collectives emerged in Oaxaca City, transforming it into what practitioners describe as Mexico's printmaking capital. Active groups including ASARO, Colectivo Subterráneos, Lapiztola, and Taller Artístico Comunitario use woodblock printing and muralism to address social and political issues.

The state has not produced as many writers as painters, but some important names include Adalberto Carriedo, Jacobo Dalevuelta, Andrés Henestrosa, and Natalia Toledo.

Music and dance are almost inextricably linked to the state's folkloric heritage. Even more modern composers, such as Macedonio Alcalá, Samuel Mondragón Noriega, Saúl Martínez García and José López Alavés, are strongly influenced by traditional melodies. Traditional music and dance have their roots in the indigenous traditions that existed long before the Spanish arrived. To these traditions were added elements from European culture and Catholicism. The three main traditions in the state are those of the Zapotecs and the Mixtecs, with a small but distinct community of Afro-Mexicans. Some of the best-known dances include Los Diablos, La Tortuga, Las Mascaritas, and Los Tejorones. In the Afro-Mexican Costa Chica region, Las Chilenas stands out as a dance. La Sandunga is a song that typifies the musical style of the Tehuantepec region, and "son bioxho" is an endemic form of the son style played with drums, an empty tortoise shell, and a reed flute.

=== Food and drink ===
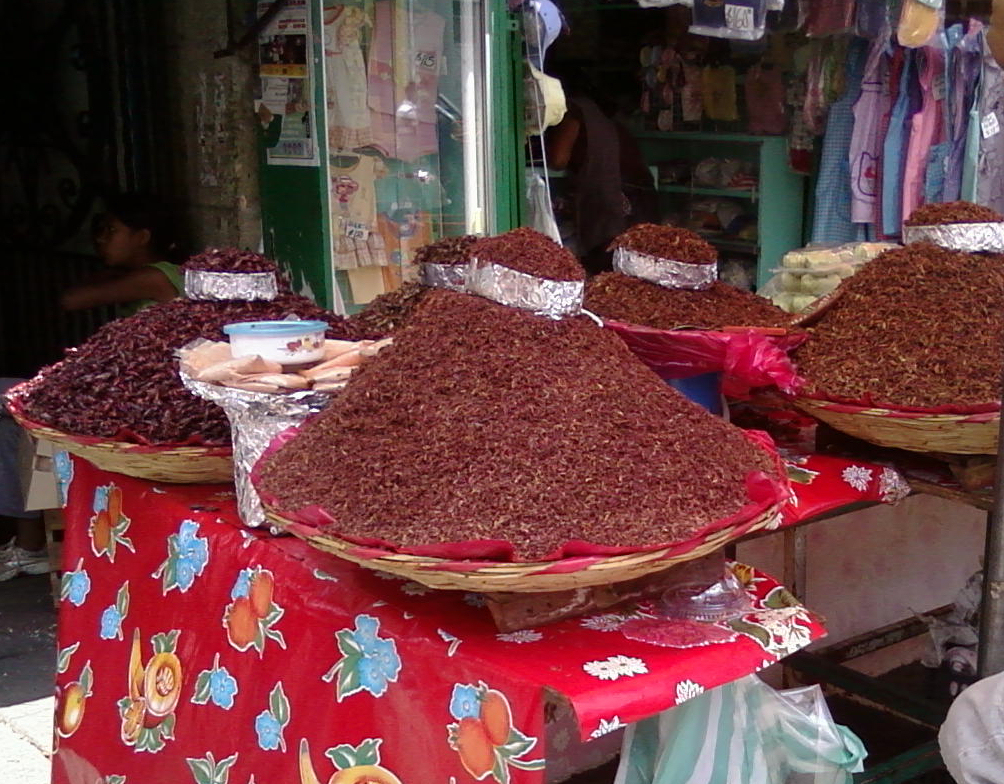
Various sizes of Chapulines at the Mercado Benito Juárez in Oaxaca, Mexico

Oaxacan cuisine varies widely due to the relative geographic isolation of its peoples, and the climates in which foods are produced. Oaxaca's gastronomy is known for its "seven moles", chapulines (grasshoppers), Oaxaca tamales in banana leaves, tasajo and mezcal. Regional variations include the wide variety of vegetables in the Central Valleys region, fish and shellfish in the Coast and Isthmus regions and the year-round availability of tropical fruit in the Papaloapan area on the Veracruz border. Like most of the rest of Mexico, corn is the staple food, with corn tortillas, called "blandas" accompanying most meals. Black beans are preferred. Oaxaca produces seven varieties of mole called manchamanteles, chichilo, amarillo, rojo, verde, coloradito and negro. These moles and other dishes are flavored with a variety of chili peppers such as pasillas Oaxaqueños, amarillos, chilhuacles, chilcostles, chile anchos and costeños. Epazote, pitiona and hoja santa are favored herbs in Oaxacan cooking. The last is indispensable for the preparation of mole verde.

Cacao beans being ground & mixed with almonds and cinnamon to make chocolate in a Oaxacan chocolate store.

Chocolate, which is grown in the state, plays an important part in the making of certain moles, but is best known for its role as a beverage. The popular bitter chocolate drink, traditionally served cold in special cups (xicali) with a variety of spices, was once a favorite beverage among the upper classes of Mesoamerican societies. The cacao beans are ground then combined with sugar, almonds, cinnamon and other ingredients to form bars. Pieces of these bars are mixed with hot milk or water and drunk. Mexican entrepreneurs of the region aim to preserve Oaxaca's rich cocoa culture and its associated traditional knowledge collaborating indigenous communities to revitalize these traditions and promote social, economic, and environmental development in the state of Oaxaca.

Oaxaca cheese is a soft white string cheese which is similar to mozzarella. It is sold in "ropes" which are wound onto themselves into balls. It is eaten cold or lightly melted on quesadillas and other dishes. One unique aspect to Oaxacan cuisine is the consumption of "chapulines", which are a type of grasshopper that has been fried and seasoned with salt, lime and chili pepper.

There is a saying in Oaxaca, "Para todo mal, mezcal, para todo bien, también" (For everything bad, mezcal; for everything good, the same.) Alcoholic and non alcoholic drinks (as well as food items) based on the maguey plant have been consumed in many parts of Mexico since early in the pre-Hispanic period. The tradition of the making of the distilled liquor called mezcal has been a strong tradition in the Oaxacan highlands since the colonial period. One reason for this is the quality and varieties of maguey grown here. Some varieties, such as espadín and arroquense are cultivated but one variety called tobalá is still made with wild maguey plants. It is made with the heart of the plant which is roasted in pits (giving the final product a smokey flavor) and is sometimes flavored with a chicken or turkey breast (pechuga) added to the mash. It is mezcal, not tequila, and may contain a "worm", which is really a larva that infests maguey plants. The final distilled product can be served as is or can be flavored (called cremas) with almonds, coffee, cocoa fruits and other flavors.

The town of Santiago Matatlán calls itself the world capital of mezcal. In many parts of the Central Valleys area, one can find small stands and stores selling locally made mezcal on roadsides.

=== Landmarks and tourist attractions ===
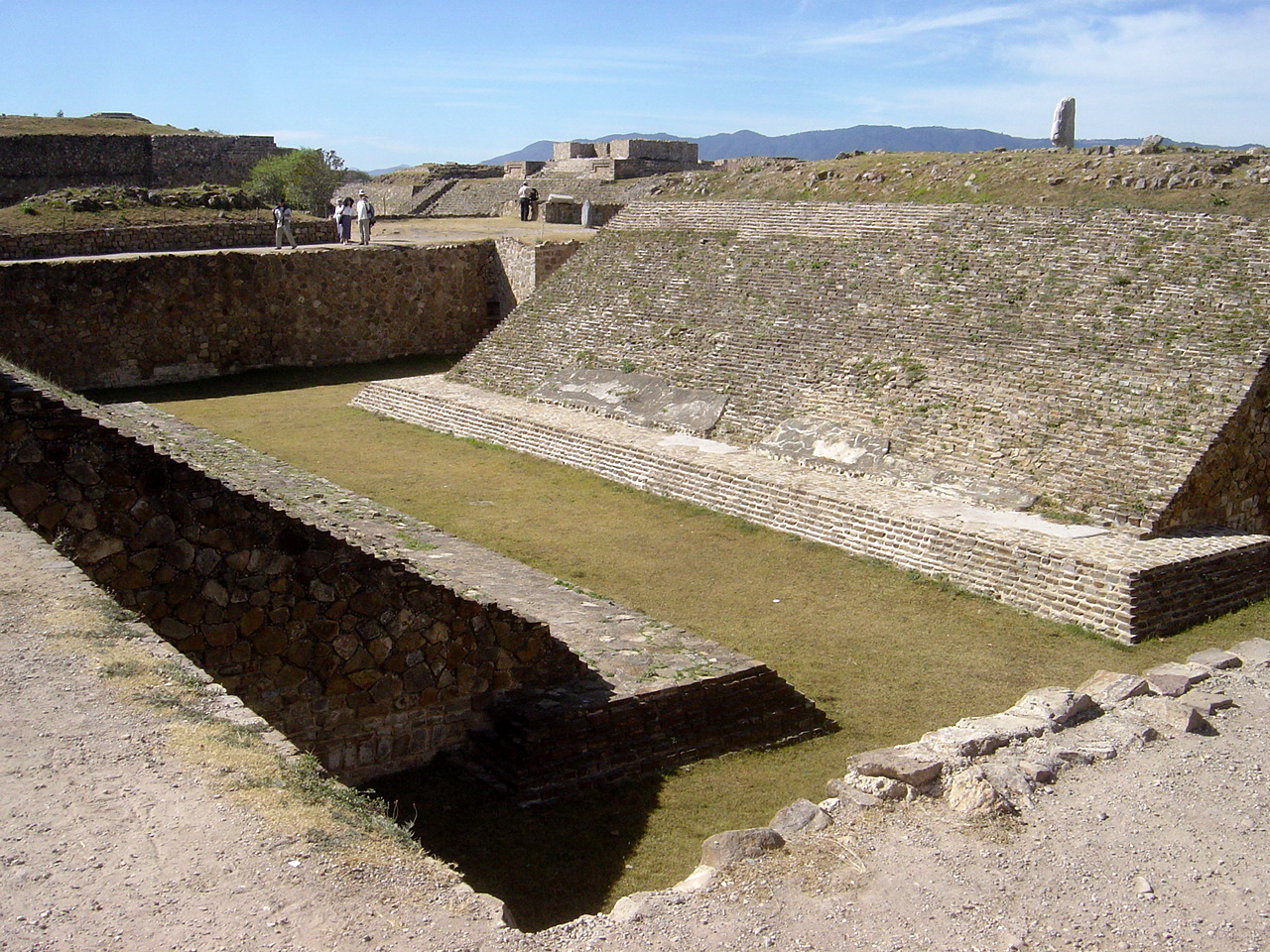
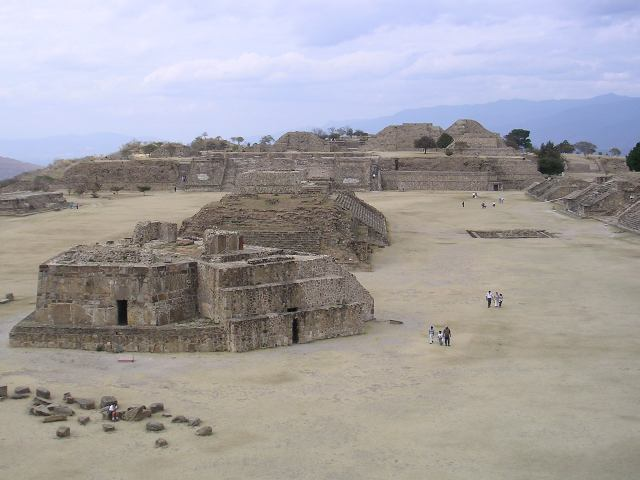
Monte Albán

Most tourist attractions are located in the city of Oaxaca and the Central Valleys region that surrounds it. This area is the cultural, geographical and political center of the state, filled with pre-Hispanic ruins, Baroque churches and monasteries, indigenous markets and villages devoted to various crafts. The capital city, along with nearby Monte Albán together are listed as a World Heritage Site. Many of the attractions in the city proper are located between the main square or Zocalo and along Andador Macedonio Alcalà Street, known as the Andador Turístico or Tourist Walkway. These include the Cathedral, the Basilica of Nuestra Señora de la Soledad, Museum of Contemporary Art (MACO), Rufino Tamayo Museum and the Mercado 20 de Noviembre, known for its food stands. The most important annual festival is the Guelaguetza, also called the Fiesta del Lunes del Cerro (Festival of Mondays at the Mountain) which occurs each July.

The largest and most important archeological site is Monte Albán, which was capital of the Zapotec empire. Also important as an archaeological site is the ancient Zapotec center of Mitla at the eastern end of the Central Valleys which is noted for its unique ancient stone fretwork and abstract mosaics. Between Mitla and Monte Albán there are a number of other important archeological sites such as Yagul, Dainzú and Lambityeco. The most important of these three is Lambityeco, in the middle of the Tlacolula Valley. It was occupied from 600 BCE to 800 CE and coincides with Monte Alban. It was important at that time for its production of salt. Yagul is a ceremonial center on the side of a mountain. Features include a Mesoamerican ball court, the La Rana courtyard, a temple, palace and other buildings.

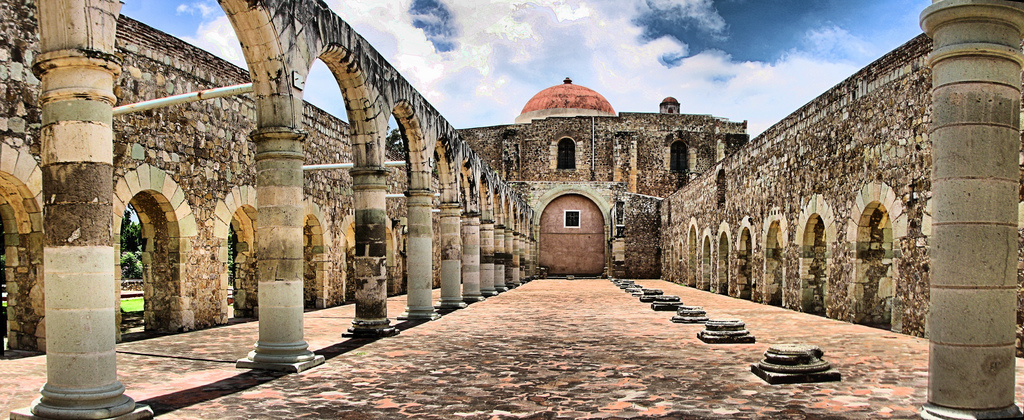
Ex-monastery of Santiago Apóstol in Cuilapan de Guerrero

Other attractions in the area include colonial constructions such as the monasteries in Cuilapan, Tlaxiaco, Coixthlahuaca, Yanhuitlán and Santo Domingo. Churches include the Cathedral in Oaxaca and the main church of Teposcolula. Hierve el Agua is an area with "petrified" waterfalls, where water with extremely high mineral content falls over the side of cliffs, forming stone waterfall-like structures. The name means "boiling water" but the water is not hot; rather it pushes up from the ground in places which looks like water boiling. Santa María del Tule is home to an enormous Montezuma cypress (Taxodium mucronatum) tree which is over 2,000 years old. The town of Zaachila is known for its archeological site and weekly market.

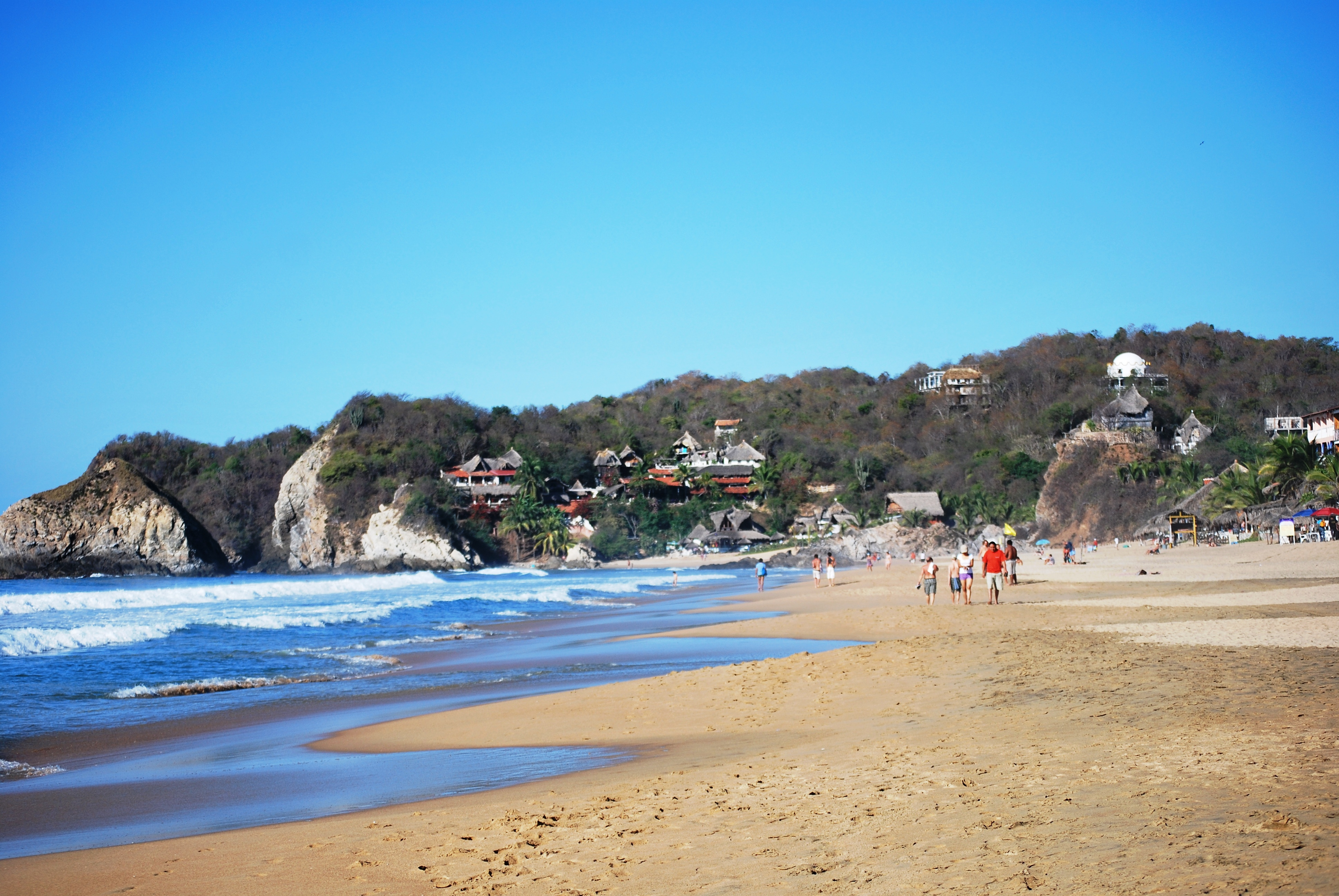
View of Zipolite Beach

The second most important zone for tourism is the coast, especially from Puerto Escondido to Huatulco, with sandy beaches on the Pacific Ocean, dolphins, sea turtles, and lagoons with water birds. Many beaches are nearly virgin with few visitors but several areas have been developed such as Puerto Escondido, Huatulco, Puerto Ángel, Zipolite, San Agustinillo and Mazunte. Puerto Escondido is an important destination for tourism from within Mexico with beaches such as Playa Carrizalillo and also attracts international surfers to Zicatela Beach, where an annual surfing competition is held. There are also areas of Oaxaca that are promoted for ecotourism such as Lagunas de Chacahua National Park set in 14,267 hectares of lagoons, rivers, beaches, mangroves, rainforest and grasslands with some 136 species of birds, 23 of reptiles, 4 amphibians and twenty types of mammals.

Yagul Natural Monument, located in the Tlacolula Valley, 35 km to the east of Oaxaca city, was a settlement in the early part of the Monte Alban 1 Period (500 CE). It flourished as an urban centre, following the abandonment of Monte Alban around 800 BCE. However, even Yagul was abandoned for a brief period, before it became a city-state in Oaxaca. This status continued until the Spanish Conquistadores invaded the valley, which was then a settlement of Zapotecs. The fortified complex is laid out in three zones; the central part approached through a series of steps is a built-up platform that leads to the temples and palaces. It has the largest ball court in the valley and stated to be the second largest in the Mesoamerican region. The palace of the rulers is an enormous monolith with six porticos and several entrances, built in stone and clay and covered with stucco. The main tomb has a stone façade, which is beautified with carved human heads and features hieroglyphic motifs on the door slab on both sides. To the south of the Palace of the Six Porticos, there is a narrow street that is paved with stone mosaics extracted from the nearby mountain. The street terminates into a long, narrow room called the 'Sala de Consejo' (Council Chamber).

=== Handicrafts ===
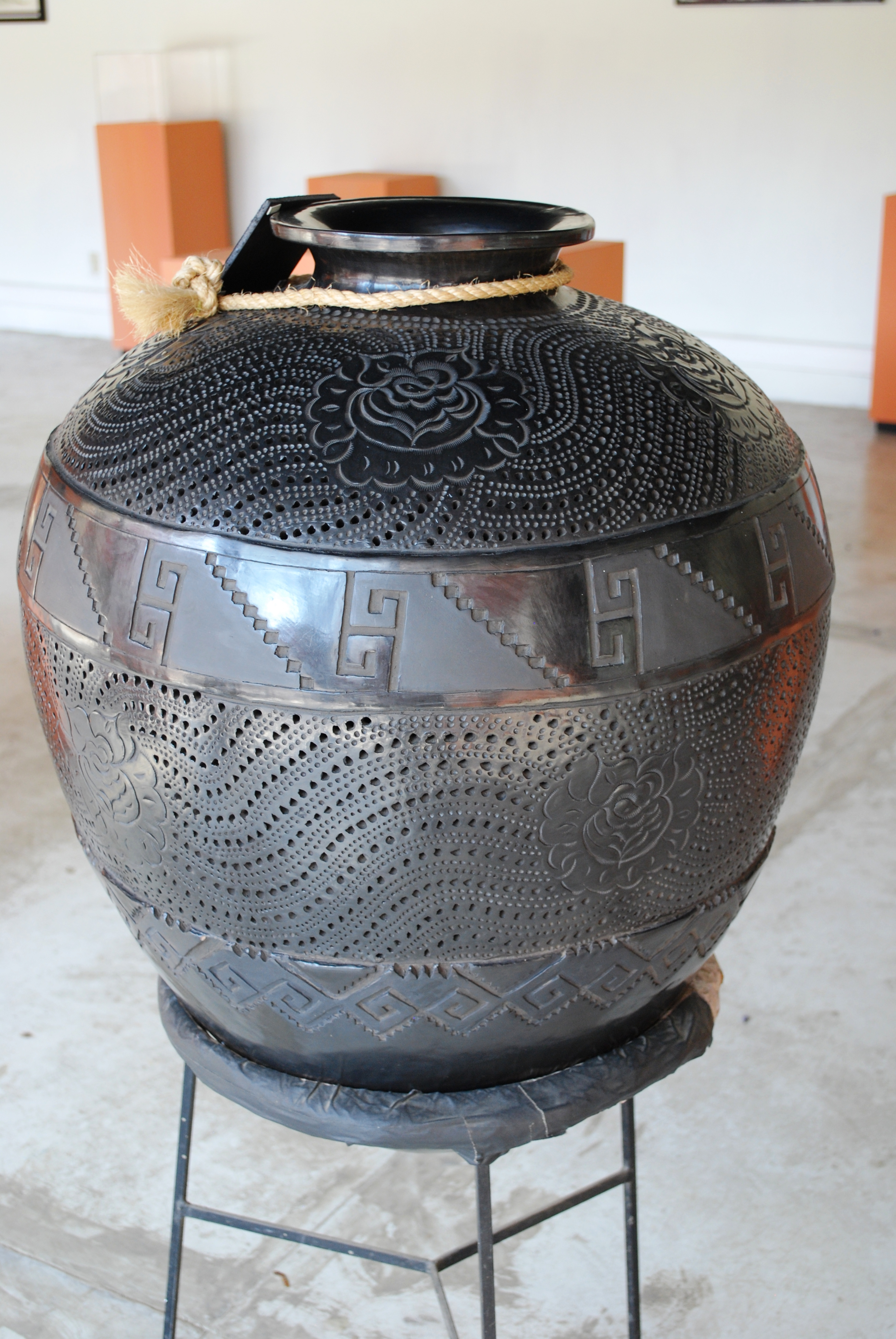
Barro negro pottery at the state crafts museum

Because of its indigenous tradition and abundance of raw materials, Oaxaca is a leading producer of handcrafts in Mexico. Handcrafted items here are noted for their variety and quality. Oaxacan handcrafts are traditionally made with wood, wool, clay and leather and are sold in many venues from local tianguis markets to upscale international stores. The best-known wood craft is the making of "alebrije" figures, which are usually miniature, brightly colored real or imaginary animals. These were originally created from paper and cardboard in Mexico City, but this craft was adapted to native Oaxacan woodcarving to the form it has today. Carver Manuel Jiménez of Arrazola is credited with the creating of the Oaxacan version of this craft. Other wood crafts include the making of masks, toys and utensils. Major woodcarving areas include San Martín Tilcajete and Arrazola.

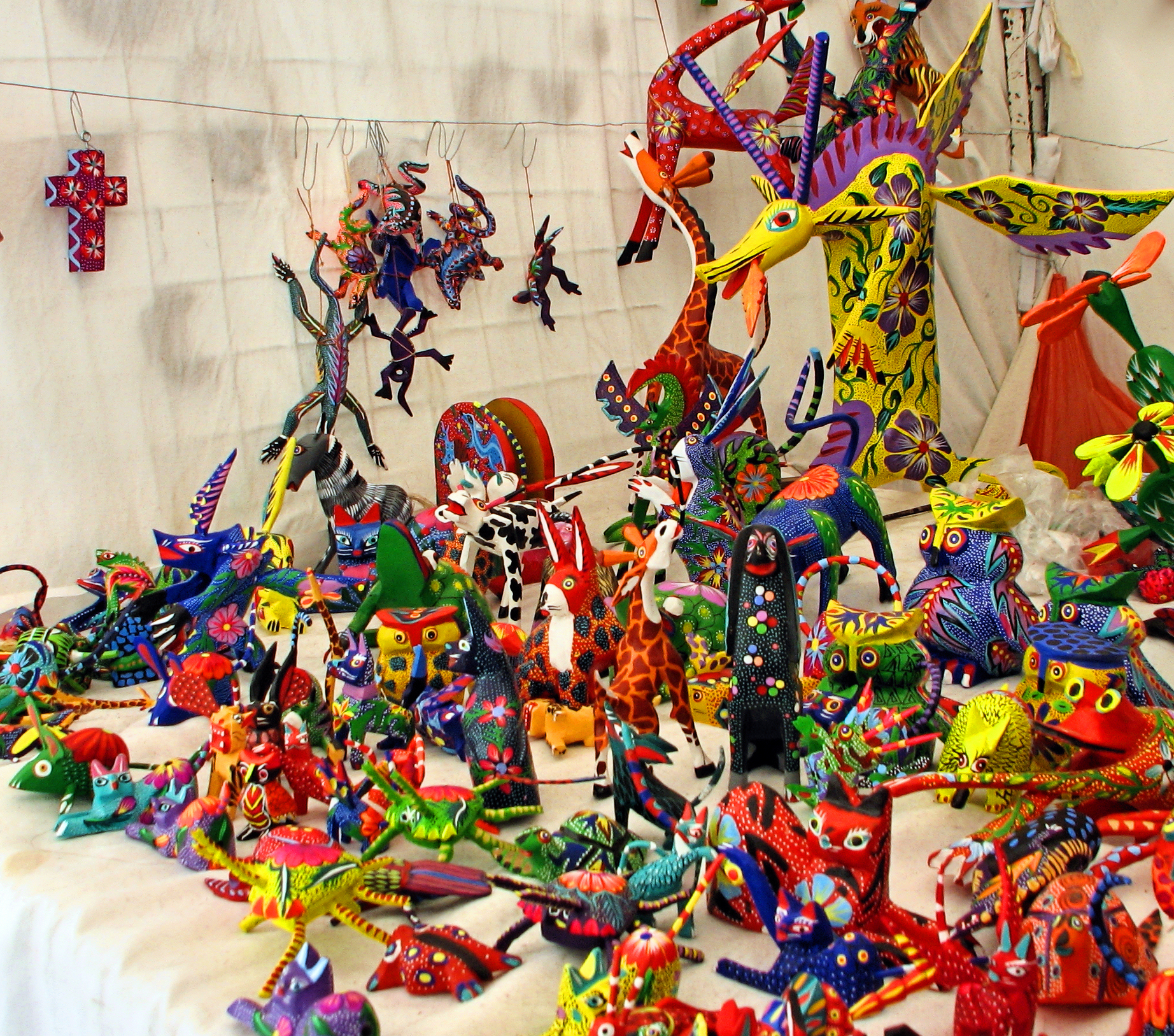
Alebrijes at the Pochote Market in Oaxaca

Pottery has a long tradition that extends into the pre-Hispanic period. Oaxaca shares many pottery types with other parts of Mexico along with two of its own: barro negro and the green glazed pottery of Atzompa. The first is centered in the town of San Bartolo Coyotepec near the capital city. This pottery gets its color from the local clay used to make it and its shine from a technique developed by Doña Rosa Nieto in the mid-20th century. The Atompa green-glazed ware is made much the same way it was in colonial times, although there have been some recent innovations with color and decorative techniques. This pottery is found in Santa María Atzompa, near Oaxaca city.

Another major craft category is textiles. Textiles from cotton and other fibers date to early in the pre-Hispanic period on backstrap looms. This form of weaving has been dominated by women since that time. The Spanish introduced the wide European frame loom, which is mostly used by men. Traditional clothing items such as huipils are still made on backstrap looms, while the European looms are used to produce larger and heavier items such as rugs, sarapes and blankets, notably in the village of Teotitlán del Valle. Other items are produced with cotton fibers, although some maguey fibers can be found, while palm fronds are used to produce mats and hats. Embroidery is an important part of indigenous clothing, especially for women. One municipality noted for its indigenous and embroidered clothing is Santo Tomás Jalietza, just south of the city of Oaxaca. The Xochimilco neighborhood of the capital is known for its embroidered tablecloths, napkins and other tableware.

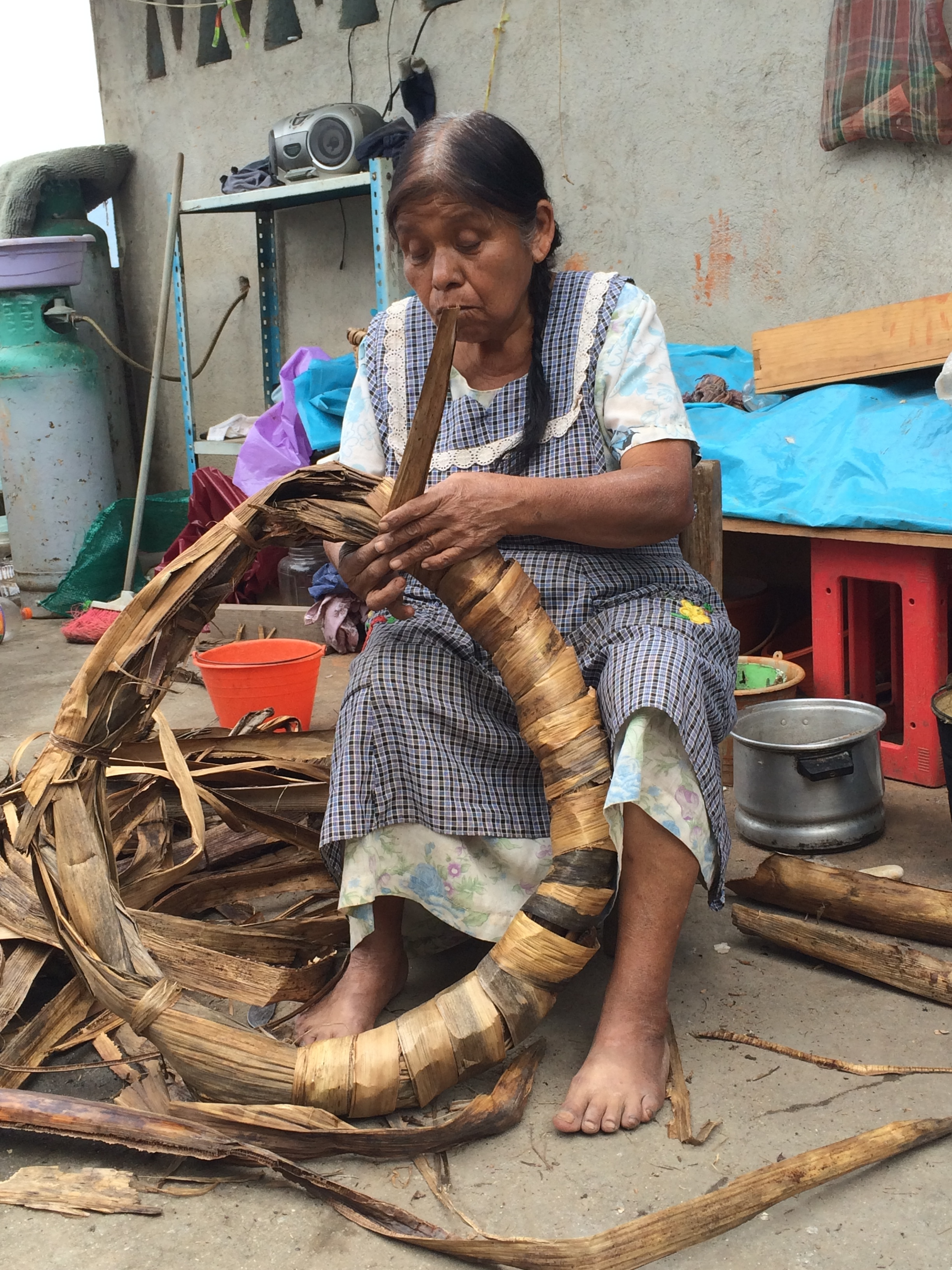
Craftswoman making banana leaf bun in Tavehua, Oaxaca.

Both precious and non-precious metals are worked in the state. Many gold and silver jewelry items are made with filigree (fine metal thread) which is weaved and wrapped into shapes. This technique is Arab in origin and was introduced by the Spanish. The municipalities of Santo Domingo Tehuantepec, Juchitán de Zaragoza and Huajuapan de León are known for this work. Other metals, especially iron, are forged into utilitarian and decorative items in places such as Santiago Jamiltepec and Tlacolula de Matamoros. Items produced include mirrors, frames, figures, knives, machetes and more.

=== Symbols ===
==== Flag ====
The state of Oaxaca has no official flag, but the state government uses a flag with a white background and a shield in the center.

==== Coat of Arms ====
The coat of arms consists of a red canvas, wrapped around its upper end; inside within a white oval is the inscription "EL RESPETO AL DERECHO AJENO ES LA PAZ" (Respect for the rights of others is peace), and the slogan words are separated from each other by symbolic representations of nopales. The inner oval is divided into three parts: on the bottom are two arms breaking chains; in the upper left is a stylised image of the state of Oaxaca, with the flower and fruit, in a stylised form, of the huaje tree; and at the top right is the profile of one of the palaces from the archaeological site of Mitla, with a Dominican Cross to its right. Around the oval are distributed seven golden stars, three on the bottom, two on the right above the oval and two to the left above the oval. On the bottom of the canvas is the phrase "ESTADO LIBRE Y SOBERANO DE OAXACA" (The Free and Sovereign State of Oaxaca). Above the canvas is the Shield of Mexico.

==== State emblem ====
- The canvas of gules (red) as parchment: the liberation struggles of Oaxaca.
- The seven stars: each of the seven regions of the state. "Huaxyacac" ancient place name of Oaxaca.
- The two strong arms to breaking the chains of oppression.
- The red field on which are the arms: the yearnings of the people of Oaxaca in search of freedom.

== Education ==
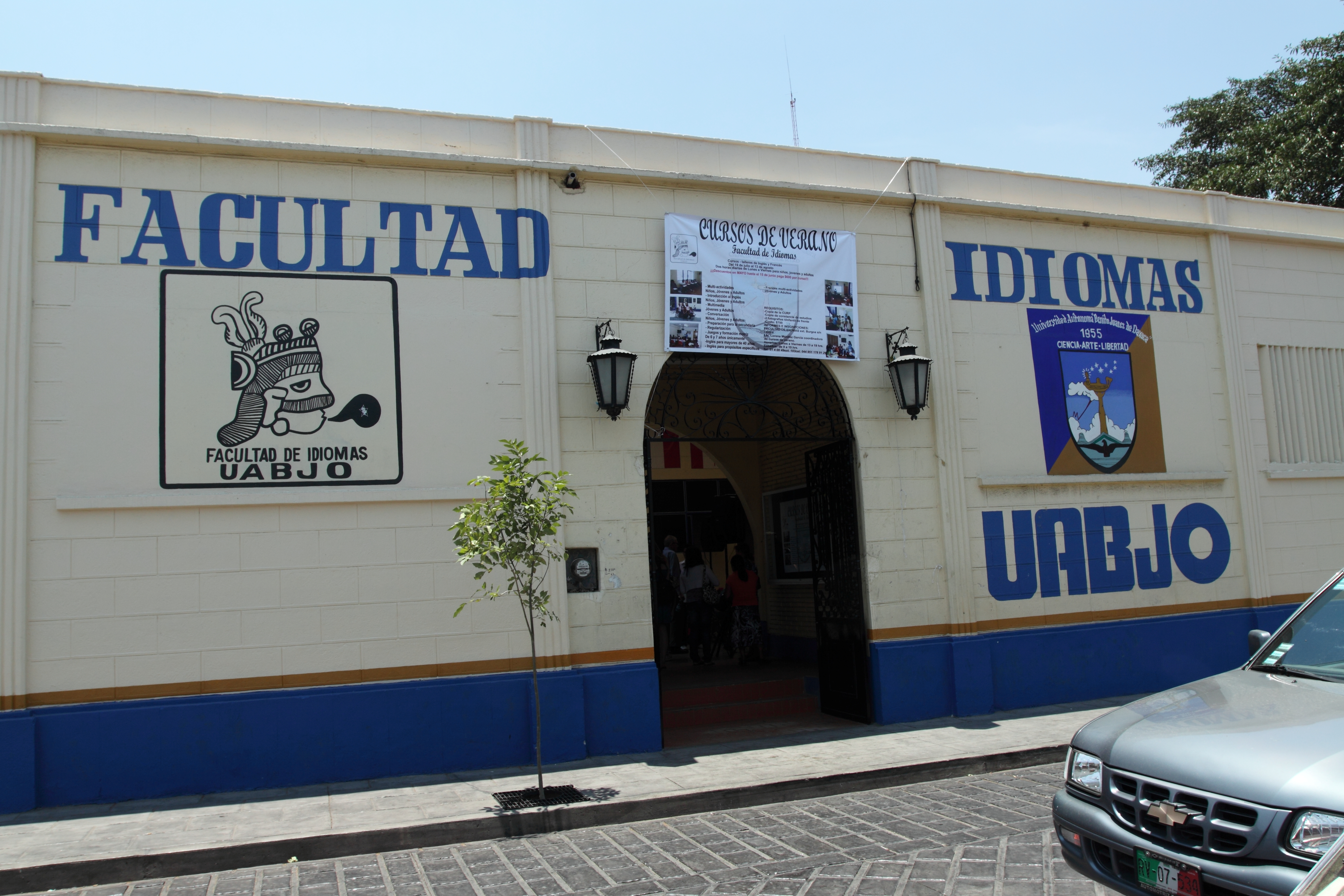
UABJO School of Languages

While the educational system of the state provides services to 1.1 million students in 12,244 schools, with 54,274 teachers, the Mexican government agency Conapo ranks Oaxaca as the third most marginalized state in Mexico, based on factors such as education and housing. 80% of the municipalities of the state do not meet minimum requirements for these services. The Sierra Sur and La Mixteca regions has the most municipalities in this category. The average child in Oaxaca attends school for 6.39 years, below the national average of 8 years.

=== Primary education ===
In rural areas of the state, there is extremely limited education offerings beyond elementary school. Indigenous people comprise 33% of the state population, of which only 5% ever attain an education beyond the primary grade levels. In addition, 90% of all indigenous teachers do not have satisfactory academic backgrounds.

Concerning the general population, most of those aged 15 years or older have finished primary school, but completion of secondary school is well below the national average. Just over 21% of the population is illiterate, above the national average of 12.4%. 45% of those over 15 years of age have not finished primary school. Only a small minority of the population has professional aspirations with 6.7% attaining studies at the baccalaureate level or above.

=== Higher education ===
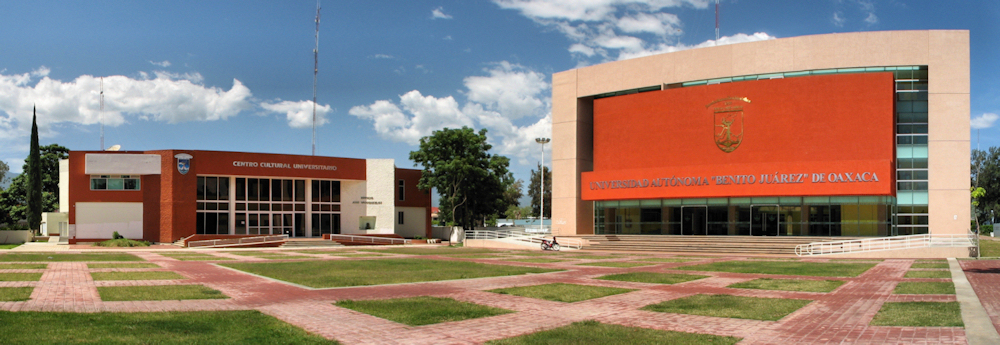
The Cultural Universitario & Rectoria on the main campus of the Universidad Autónoma Benito Juárez de Oaxaca

Higher-level education in Oaxaca has traditionally been limited to a few schools, although this is changing. The largest university in the state is the Benito Juárez Autonomous University of Oaxaca (UABJO), located in the capital city of Oaxaca de Juarez. Founded in 1827 as the Oaxacan Institute for Arts and Sciences, today UABJO offers the widest range of curricula in the state. In addition standard undergraduate studies, specialized schools such as the UABJO School of Medicine and UABJO School of Law offer advanced academic degrees (i.e. Juris Doctor, M.D., PhD) in their respective fields. Other universities the Instituto Tecnológico de Oaxaca, which offers several undergraduate and graduate level programs, and the Universidad de la Sierra Juárez, which was opened in 2005 to help provide higher education to underserved rural areas in the Sierra Juarez mountains. The UABJO has expanded its educational offerings, in coordination with the UNAM offers the type of open and distance education.

In addition there is the SUNEO university system. Two of the largest institutions of this system are the Universidad Tecnológica de la Mixteca (UTM) and the Universidad del Mar (UMAR). The first offers bachelor's, master's and postgraduate courses in the areas of computing, electronics, design and business studies, while the second offers undergraduate and master's degrees in the areas of social sciences and marine sciences.

== Health ==
Ninety five percent of Oaxaca's population receives health care from one or more government programs. Government health services used include IMSS; Seguridad Social, ISSSTE and that related to PEMEX.(infraes) The state sponsors the Servicios de Salud de Oaxaca (SSO) which primarily works to provide antibiotics and other medicines to public dispensaries. It is meant to supplement other federal and state services such as IMSS. There are 1,020 primary care medical facilities and 28 hospitals in the state, 3,240,024 people are registered in one or more government programs and are attended by 3,337 doctors, 5,400 paramedics and 6,887 other health providers. Hospital Regional de Alta Especialidad de Oaxaca was constructed by the federal government as the first "level three" or high level specialty hospital in the state. It was opened in 2006 and is located in San Bartolo Coyotepec.

One particular health problem the state has is outbreaks of dengue fever during the rainy season, which occurs from June to October. Some of these cases are hemorrhagic. The problem is more severe in the tropical lowlands of the state, near the ocean.

Despite the health services that exist, there are serious problems and deficiencies. As of 1997, life expectancy in the state was 71.5 years, 9 years higher than in 1990. The death rate has decreased from 5.79 deaths per thousand to 5.14. While much of Mexico's health care system struggles to meet needs, the system in Oaxaca, one of the country's poorest states, has it particularly bad. The relatively prosperous state of Nuevo León has 3,207 hospital beds, while Oaxaca has only 1,760, despite the fact that the two states have about the same population. There is about the same ratio of doctors between the two states. Forty four percent of pregnant women receive pre-natal care from people who are not medically qualified. 70 women each year die from complications from pregnancy and childbirth, and most of these are avoidable, due to bleeding and eclampsia. For every 100,000 live births in Oaxaca, there are 95.1 maternal deaths, over the national average of 63.3, putting the state in the top five.

The state lacks sufficient numbers of health care workers and lacks specialized hospital and other facilities. Other problems include obsolete medical equipment, lack of medicines. Many of these problems have persisted for decades. Health care providers offer an average of 20,000 consults each day, covering a population of 800,000 people. In 2000, there was only one doctor for every 180 people.

In 2006, health care workers held a work stoppage and march, demanding improvements in the health care system along with the ouster of Governor Ulises Ruiz Ortiz. Most of the participating strikers were from the hospital and emergency room sectors, from 15 hospitals and 650 health centers in the state.

In 2022, amidst soaring rates of obesity and diabetes, Oaxaca enacted a ban on sugary drinks, including notably Coca-Cola, but it was poorly enforced.

== Sports ==
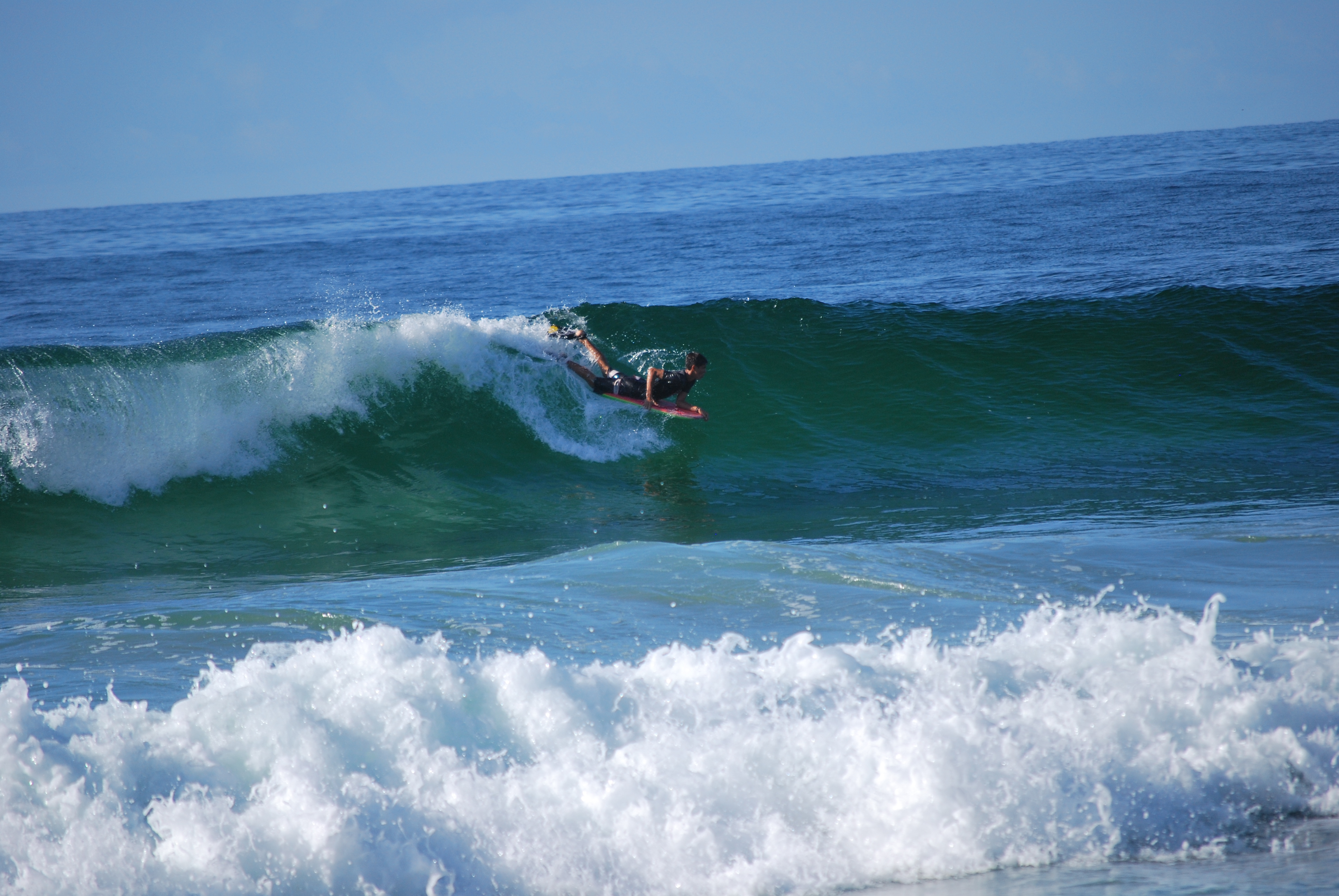
Body boarding at Zipolite

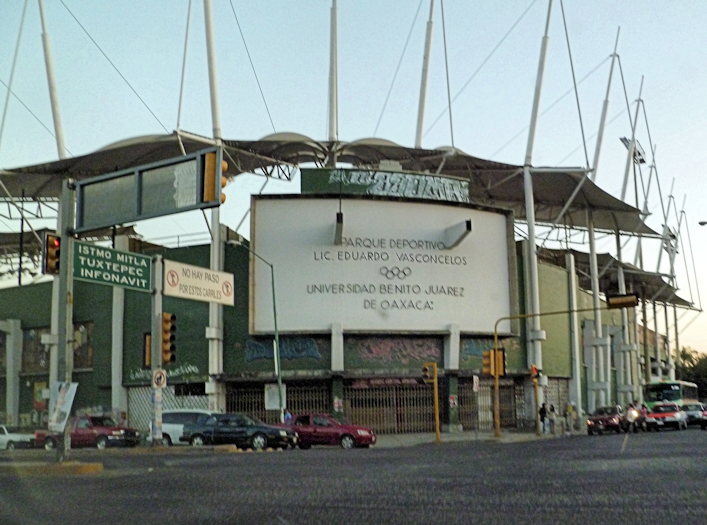
Eduardo Vasconcelos Stadium

Football, baseball and basketball are popular in Oaxaca. Football is most popular in Oaxaca city and in Huajuapan de Leon, having a notable international player by the name of Ricardo Osorio. The baseball team, Guerreros de Oaxaca, play at the Eduardo Vasconcelos Stadium in Oaxaca de Juarez and play in the Mexican League. The Oaxacan Academy of Baseball is located in the municipality of San Bartolo Coyotepec. It was created in 2009 by Alfredo Harp Helú, owner of the Diablos Rojos and Guerreros de Oaxaca teams. The goal of the academy is to reach youth people through sports and education, especially those who show talent for the sport of baseball. Vinicio Castilla is the most notable player hailing from Oaxaca, having played third base in Major League Baseball for the Atlanta Braves, Colorado Rockies, Tampa Bay Devil Rays, Houston Astros and San Diego Padres. He became the owner of the Oaxaca Guerreros in 1995 and three years later they won the championship. Basketball is practiced in all of Oaxaca, mostly played during local festivals, especially in the Sierra Norte. The area also has a tournament with the Copa Juárez as the prize.

The best known beach in Puerto Escondido is Playa Zicatela, due to its fame as a surfing attraction. The "tubes" produced by the waves that come ashore here attract advanced and professional surfers from all over Mexico and internationally. The Torneo Internacional de Surf (International Surfing Tournament) is held here each year in November and is a world class event. It has attracted names such as Nathaniel Curran from the U.S., Cris Davison from Australia and Marco Polo from Brazil, with its US$50,000 first prize.

Because of its geography and landscape, mountain biking is also common in Oaxaca and is practiced primarily in the Sierra Norte in Ixtlan de Juarez, San Antonio Cuajimoloyas, Santa Catarian Ixtepeji, Benito Juarez Lachatao and San Isidro Llano Grande. Surfing is common in places such as Huatulco Bay and Puerto Escondido, with the annual Zicatela beach tournament held in November. Snorkeling and scuba diving take place in Puerto Escondido, principally in Playa Carrizalillo and Playa Manzanillo, Playa Marinero and Puerto Angelito and at Huatulco. Sport fishing is common in Puerto Escondido and in Huatulco with tournaments held in November and May respectively. Anglers, catch sailfish, dorado, marlin and others. In Huajuapan de Leon there is a fishing tournament at the Yosocuta Dam in July; it is noted for its black bass (lobina). Kayaking also takes places along the Copalita River in Huatulco.

== Notable people from Oaxaca ==
- Benito Juárez – President of Mexico
- Porfirio Díaz – President of Mexico
- José Vasconcelos - Writer, philosopher and politician
- Ricardo Flores Magón – anarchist
- Rufino Tamayo – Painter
- Francisco Toledo – Painter
- Macedonio Alcalá – Composer
- Andrés Henestrosa - Writer
- Rodolfo Morales – Painter
- Rodolfo Nieto – Painter
- María Sabina – Curandera
- Yésica Sánchez Maya – Human rights defender
- Jesús Rasgado - Musician
- Lila Downs – Singer
- Patricia Reyes Spíndola – Actress, director and producer
- Yalitza Aparicio – Actress and educator
- Lupita Tovar – Film actress
- Javier Aquino – International soccer player
- Vinny Castilla – major league baseball third baseman
- Gerónimo Gil – major league baseball catcher
- Ricardo Osorio – International soccer player
- Karen Vega – model
- Lorena Vera – composer, producer, dancer, actress and singer

== See also ==
- La Mixteca
- Mendicant monasteries in Mexico
- Oaxaca Cartel
- Oaxacan (disambiguation)
