= Economy of Oaxaca =

According to the Mexican government agency Conapo (National Population Council), Oaxaca is the third most economically marginalized states in Mexico. The state has 3.3% of the population but produces only 1.5% of the GNP. The main reason for this is the lack of infrastructure and education, especially in the interior of the state outside of the capital. Eighty percent of the state's municipalities do not meet federal minimums for housing and education. Most development projects are planned for the capital and the surrounding area. Little has been planned for the very rural areas and the state lacks the resources to implement them. The largest sector of Oaxaca's economy is agriculture, mostly done communally in ejidos or similar arrangements. About 31% of the population is employed in agriculture, about 50% in commerce and services and 22% in industry. The commerce sector dominates the gross domestic product at 65.4%, followed by industry/mining at 18.9% and agriculture at 15.7%.

In May 2010, Standard & Poor's raised the rating of the state from ‘mxBBB+’ to ‘mxA-’ with a stable outlook. Much of the reason for this is the better administration of public funds and better balanced budgets despite cutbacks in federal subsidies. This improvement in public finances has been occurring over the five or so years. The major draw on the state's credit is the lack of economic development.

== Migration ==
Poverty and migration are caused mostly by the lack of economic development in the state, which leaves most of the population working in the least productive sector. This has led to wide scale migration, mostly from the rural areas, to find employment. Within Oaxaca, many people leave rural villages to work in the city of Oaxaca, the Papaloapan area and the coast. Within Mexico, many leave for Mexico City, Mexico State, Sinaloa, Baja California and Baja California Sur. Most of those leaving the state are agricultural workers. As of 2005, over 80,000 people from Oaxaca state live in some other part of Mexico. Most of those leaving Oaxaca and Mexico go to the United States. Much of the current wave of emigration began in the late 1970s, and by the 1980s Oaxaca ranked 8th in the number of people leaving for the US from Mexico. Today, that percentage has fallen to 20th. Most of those who go to the United States concentrate in California and Illinois.

In 45.5% of Oaxaca's municipalities, the population has declined due to migration. Most of these are municipalities with less than 15,000 inhabitants and mostly indigenous. These municipalities are mostly located in the Sierra Norte, La Mixteca and the Central Valleys regions, with many heading to the United States. Those emigrating from the La Cañada, Isthmus and Papaloapan areas generally stay within Mexico.

== Agriculture and natural resources ==
"...its sugar and fruit are so good, that the sweetmeats of Oaxaca are reckoned the best in America...It breeds horses, large cattle, and many sheep, whole wool is made use of in manufacturers of al Puebla. Mulberry-trees are here in such numbers, that they could make more silk than any other province. ...but, the productions the most attended to, and which make Oaxaca most commended, because they make a capital object in the trade of Mexico with other nations, are cochineal and vanilla."

— Thomas Kitchin, The Present State of the West-Indies: Containing an Accurate Description of What Parts Are Possessed by the Several Powers in Europe, 1778

The economy is based on agriculture, especially in the interior of the state. Only 9% of the territory is suitable for agriculture due to the mountainous terrain, so there are limits to this sector. The production of basics, such as corn and beans, is mostly for auto consumption, but this production cannot meet demand.

The total agricultural production of the state was estimated at 13.4 million tons with a value of 10,528 million pesos in 2007. As of 2000, 1,207,738 hectares are used for the raising of crops, most of which occurs during the annual rainy season, with only 487,963 having crops growing year round. Only 81,197 hectares have irrigation. The variation of climate allows for a wider range of agricultural crops than would otherwise. Oaxaca is the nation's second highest producer of grains and agave. It is third in the production of peanuts, mango and sugar cane. It is the second largest producer of goat meat, providing about 10% of the national total. In the more temperate areas crops such as corn, beans, sorghum, peanuts, alfalfa and wheat are grown. In more tropical areas, crops also include coffee, sesame seed, rice, sugar cane and pineapple.

Livestock is raised on 3,050,106 hectares or 32% of the state's land. Cattle dominate in the Tuxtepec, Isthmus and Coast regions, with pigs dominating in higher elevations such as the Central Valleys Region. Other animals include sheep, goats, domestic fowl and bees. The Value of this production was estimated at 2,726.4 million pesos with cattle comprising over half of this.

Coffee is grown in mountain areas near the Pacific Ocean in municipalities such as Santa María Huatulco, Pluma Hidalgo, Candelaria Loxicha, San Miguel del Puerto and San Mateo Piñas. The growing of coffee here dates back to the 17th and 18th centuries when English pirates introduced the plant. Later, German immigrants ran coffee plantations but were forced to abandon them during the Second World War. Today, most coffee producers are organic and environmentally friendly, using traditional methods. Some of the best known farms include La Gloria, San Miguel del Puerto, Margaritas and El Pacifico, with the last two open to ecotourism.

Coastal fishing is an industry which still has room for development. The state has 510 km of coastline, 155,000 hectares of lagoons and estuaries. In addition there are 80 inland bodies of water. Species which are fished and/or farmed include shrimp, mojarra, huachinango and shark. In 2007, the total catch is estimated at 9,300 tons with a value of over 174 million pesos.

Forests cover approximately 6.3 million hectares. 5 million of these belong to various ejido and other communal organizations. Only a total of 164,759 hectares have official clearance for logging; however, unofficial and illegal logging is commonplace.

== Mining and industry ==
Mining has traditionally been important to the economy and history. Hernán Cortés sought and received the title of the Marquis of the Valley of Oaxaca in order to claim mineral and other rights. Currently coal, salt, chalk, petroleum, marble, lime, graphite, titanium, silver, gold and lead are still extracted. Most mines today are located in Etla, Ixtlán, San Pedro Taviche, Pápalo and Salinas Cruz. There is an oil and natural gas refinery in Salinas Cruz, which provides products to the state and other areas on Mexico's Pacific coast.

== Women in the economy of Oaxaca ==
The state of Oaxaca has the highest rate (80 percent), in all of Mexico, of workers in the informal sector. Even though only 33 percent of women participate in the labor sector and almost one out of four women work unpaid jobs, the women in Oaxaca take on a variety of jobs in the formal and informal workforce sectors.

The shortage of opportunities in the formal labor market for women in Oaxaca is attributed to not only gender discrimination and their responsibilities within the home, but also geographical dispersion, and lack of market education. For indigenous women, the barriers are even higher as high rates of illiteracy and language barriers (Zapotec rather than Spanish) bar them from the job market.

=== Informal economy ===
Women in Oaxaca have worked on the margins of the economy for centuries. Women often see their jobs as an extension of their household activities. These include jobs such as working on milpas (fields), huertas (kitchen gardens), or textile work. Notably, Oaxaca has accounted for more women in the informal economy than any other state in Mexico. Many men and women discount women's jobs because the tasks do not fit the typical perception of a job. Women, especially Zapotec women, have a history of working in agriculture. In the 1950s women took over agriculture as many of the men migrated to the United States for the bracero temporary work program. And yet, 70 percent of women working in agriculture in Oaxaca earned nothing for their efforts.

Women in Oaxaca often earn wages through domestic labor, the sale of food and artisanal products, or the production of goods. As of 2010, over 60,000 women in Oaxaca produce an income through domestic labor. This number has gone up from 40,000 in 1990, due to wealth stratification. Women continue to face barriers even in the artisan market where men are offered higher prices for their goods. A study shows that men were often offered over 75 percent more for their products than women.

Women have pushed back to the barriers presented in the Oaxaca economy. Some women have decided to join weaving, textile, and artisan cooperatives with strategic aims to undermine monopolies sustained by U.S. imports and local merchants. Involvement in such cooperatives has fostered opportunities for women to work collectively to market their goods to customers.

=== Migration ===
The geographic stratification of the rural areas in Oaxaca leads many women to migrate to the capital city in search of formal and informal jobs. Informal jobs often include: taxi cab driving, tour guiding and domestic service. Jobs in the formal economy include positions in restaurants hotels, and stores. These jobs are in great demand in the capital city which is home to the third highest degree of wealth inequality in all of Mexico. The capital city does offer opportunities for women involved in entrepreneurial activities such as selling good and services to tourists. This market, however, is highly unstable during seasons of low tourist numbers. Andrew Jacksom

== Commerce and tourism ==
The commerce sector divides into outlets designed to serve local needs and those associated with tourism. In 2007, there were 1,927 small grocery stores, 70 tianguis and 167 municipal markets. Tourism accounts for about 30% of the commerce sector of Oaxaca's economy. The state attracts visitors from both Mexico and abroad.

The capital city Oaxaca de Juarez, is a major center for this tourism. The historic center within the city is the second largest (ranking behind Mexico City) in the entire country of Mexico. The historical center of the city accounts for 61 percent of the city economy. This also produces a floating population of around 20,000 people who gravitate towards the historic center for business purposes daily.

Tourism is important to the state as it is the only sector that is growing and brings substantial income from outside the state. Most is concentrated in the capital with some along the coast as well. The state government has been pushing this sector heavily as a means of growing the economy, with major infrastructure projects such as the Oaxaca-Puerto Escondido-Huatulco highway (scheduled to finish in 2012) and the Iberdrola hydroelectric dam.

In 2000, there were 612 hotels with 15,368 rooms. Thirteen of these were classed as five stars. The state received 1,564,936 visitors that year, over 80% of whom were from Mexico. The Central Valleys region receives the most visitors (60%), followed by the La Mixteca and Papaloapan regions (29%) and the coast (11%), in spite of the fact that only 7% of the states attractions are located in the Oaxaca city area. One reason for this is that the city of Oaxaca is only four and a half hours away from Mexico City via the federal highway.

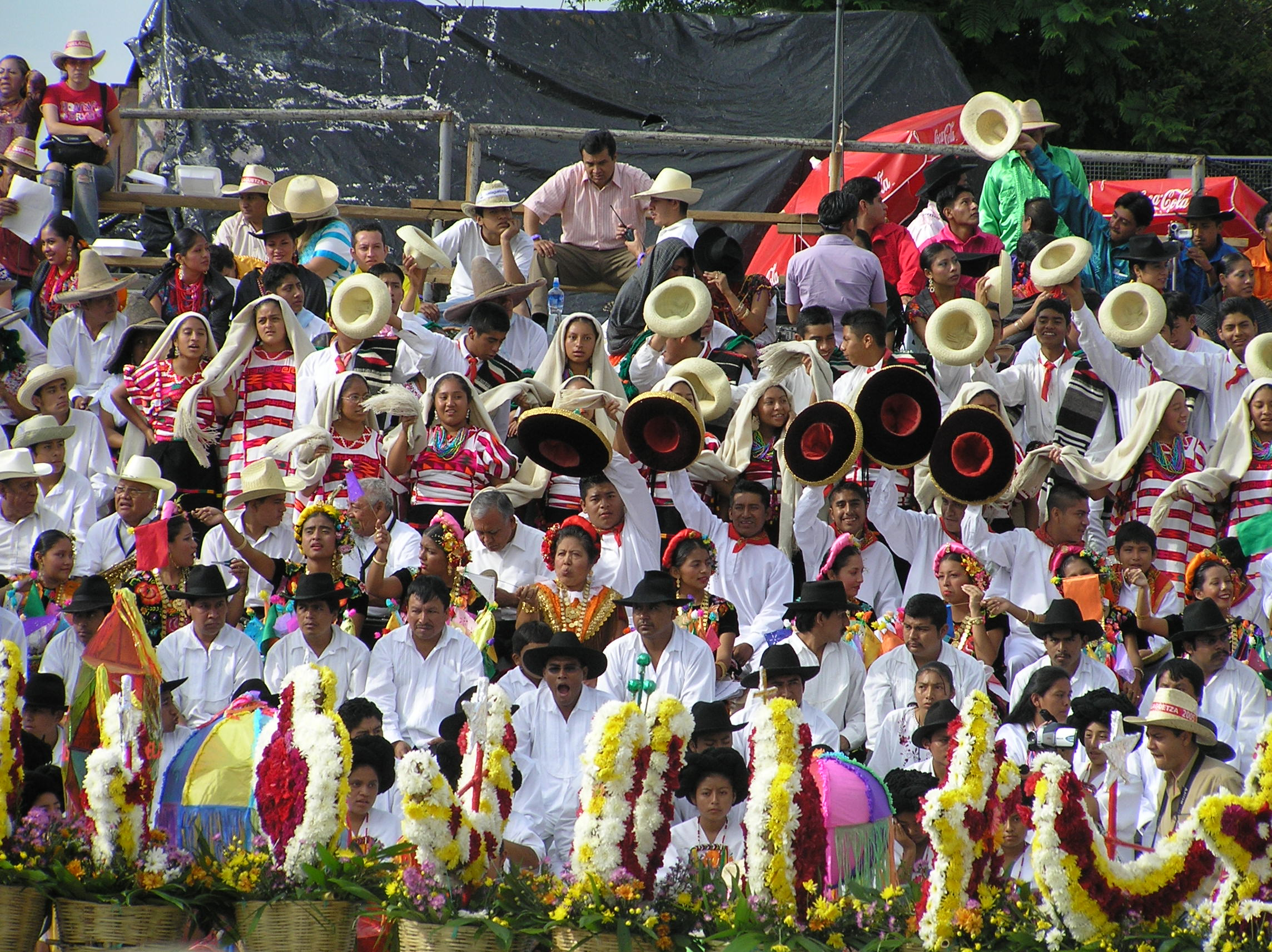
Crowds at the 2005 Guelaguetza Popular, an alternative to the government run censored Guelaguetza.

Most tourist attractions are located in the city of Oaxaca and the Central Valleys region that surrounds it. This area is the cultural, geographical and political center of the state, filled with pre-Hispanic ruins, Baroque churches and monasteries, indigenous markets and villages devoted to various crafts. The capital city, along with nearby Monte Albán together are listed as a World Heritage Site. Many of the attractions in the city proper are located between the main square or Zocalo and along Andador Macedonio Alcalà Street, known as the Andador Turístico or Tourist Walkway. These include the Cathedral, the Basilica of Nuestra Señora de la Soledad, Museum of Contemporary Art (MACO), Rufino Tamayo Museum and the Mercado 20 de Noviembre Market, known for its food stands. The most important annual festival is the Guelaguetza, also called the Fiesta del Lunes del Cerro (Festival of Mondays at the Mountain). This event has colonial and even pre-Hispanic roots but the current form began in the 1950s. It occurs each July and features dance, music, theatre and much more from all of the state's 16 recognized indigenous ethnicities. The event is held in various locations in the city as well as the theatre at the Cerro de Fortin, which was built especially for the Guelaguetza.

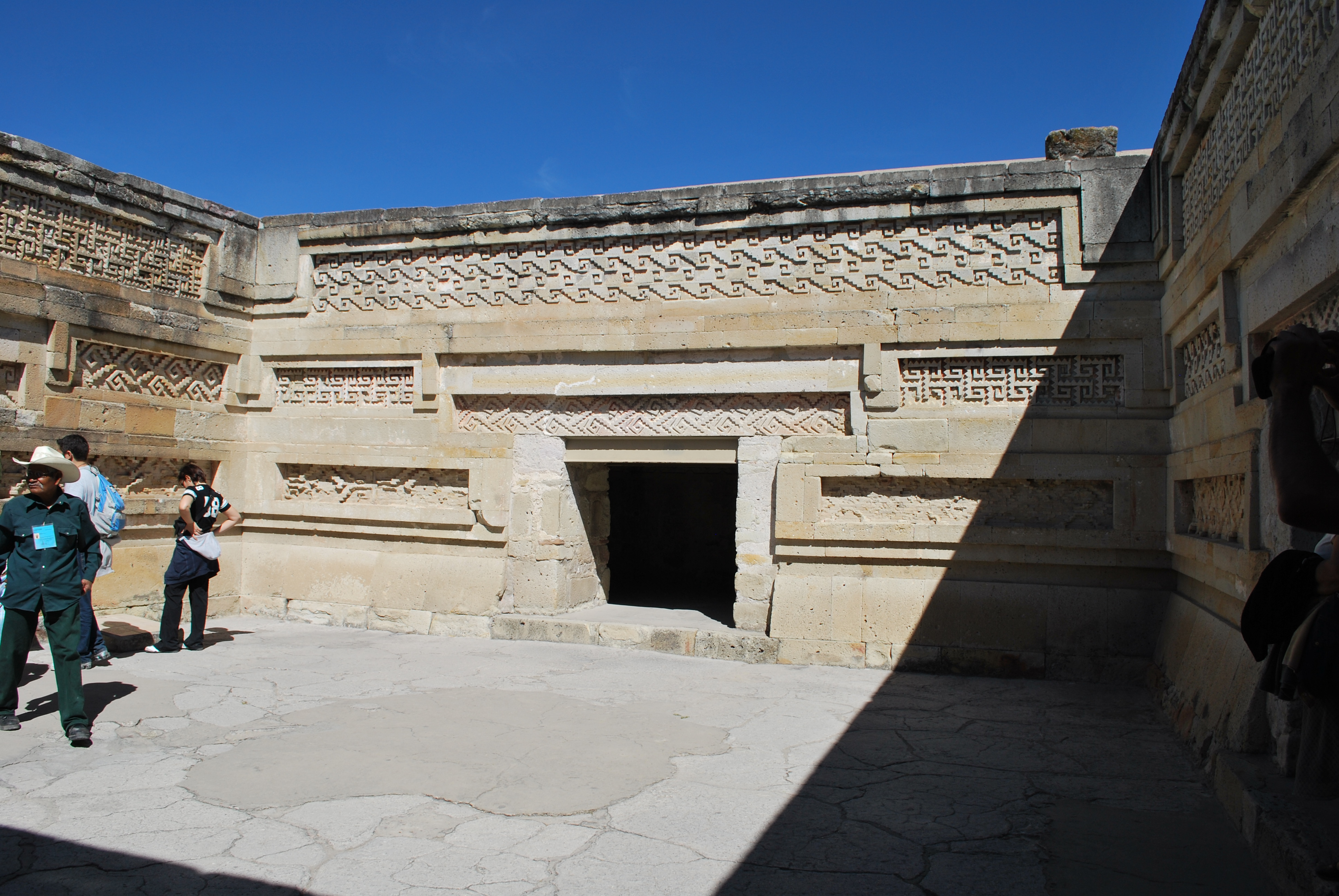
Palace courtyard of Mitla

The largest and most important archeological site is Monte Albán, which was capital of the Zapotec empire. It is located 400 meters above the valley floor, just outside the city of Oaxaca. The buildings are aligned with the cardinal directions and the movement of the stars, with the idea of creating a place that would be a meeting point between heaven and earth. While the main ceremonial center has been excavated, there still remains many kilometers square of site to explore. Located at the eastern end of the Central Valleys, another major archaeological site is the ancient Zapotec center of Mitla, which in the Zapotec language originally meant "place of the Dead." Mitla is famous for its unique ancient stone fretwork. These mosaics are completely abstract with no representations of animals or humans.

Between Mitla and Monte Albán there are a number of other important archeological sites such as Yagul, Dainzú and Lambiteyco.The most important of these three is Lambiteyco, in the middle of the Tlacolula Valley. It was occupied from 600 BCE to 800 CE and coincides with Monte Alban. It was important at that time for its production of salt. Yagul is a ceremonial center on the side of a mountain. Features include a Mesoamerican ball court, the La Rana courtyard, a temple, palace and other buildings.

The Valleys are also home to a number of villages known for specializing in a craft. Teotitlán del Valle is the best known for its textiles, especially rugs. Many are made by families starting from raw wool, which is spun, dyed and woven by hand. Designs can be traditional Zapotec and Mixtec designs to reproductions of works from artists such as Picasso and Matisse. In addition to rugs, ponchos, curtains and sarapes are made. The town of San Bartolo Coyotepec is known for its barro negro pottery. This pottery is made with a type of clay from the surrounding area. This clay traditionally would back to a dull gray color. In the 1950s, a woman by the name of Doña Rosa Nieto discovered how to get it to fire a shiny metallic black, which made the pieces more valuable. Another distinctive pottery with a green glaze is made in the town of Santa María Atzompa. Handcrafted steel blades can be found, such as those of Angel Aguilar in Octolán de Morelos.

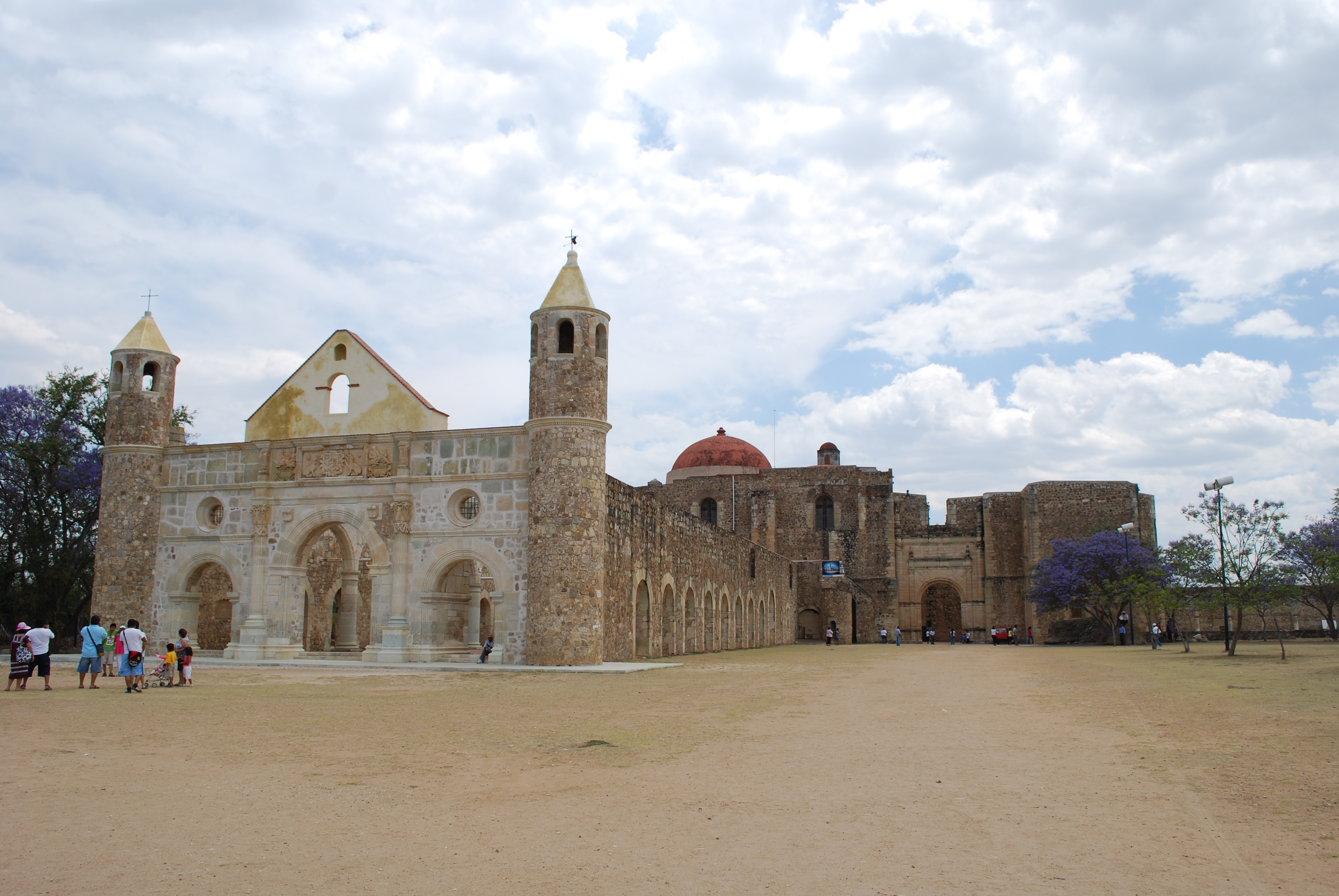
Monastery complex at Cuilapan de Guerrero

Other attractions in the area include colonial constructions such as the monasteries in Cuilapan, Tlaxiaco, Coixthlahuaca, Yanhuitlán and Santo Domingo. Churches include the Cathedral in Oaxaca and the main church of Teposcolula. Hierve el Agua is an area with “petrified” waterfalls, where water with extremely high mineral content falls over the side of cliffs, forming stone waterfall-like structures. The name means “boil the water” but the water is not hot; rather it pushes up from the ground in places which looks like water boiling. Santa María del Tule is home to an enormous Montezuma cypress (Taxodium mucronatum) tree which is over 2,000 years old. The town of Zaachila is known for its archeological site and weekly market.

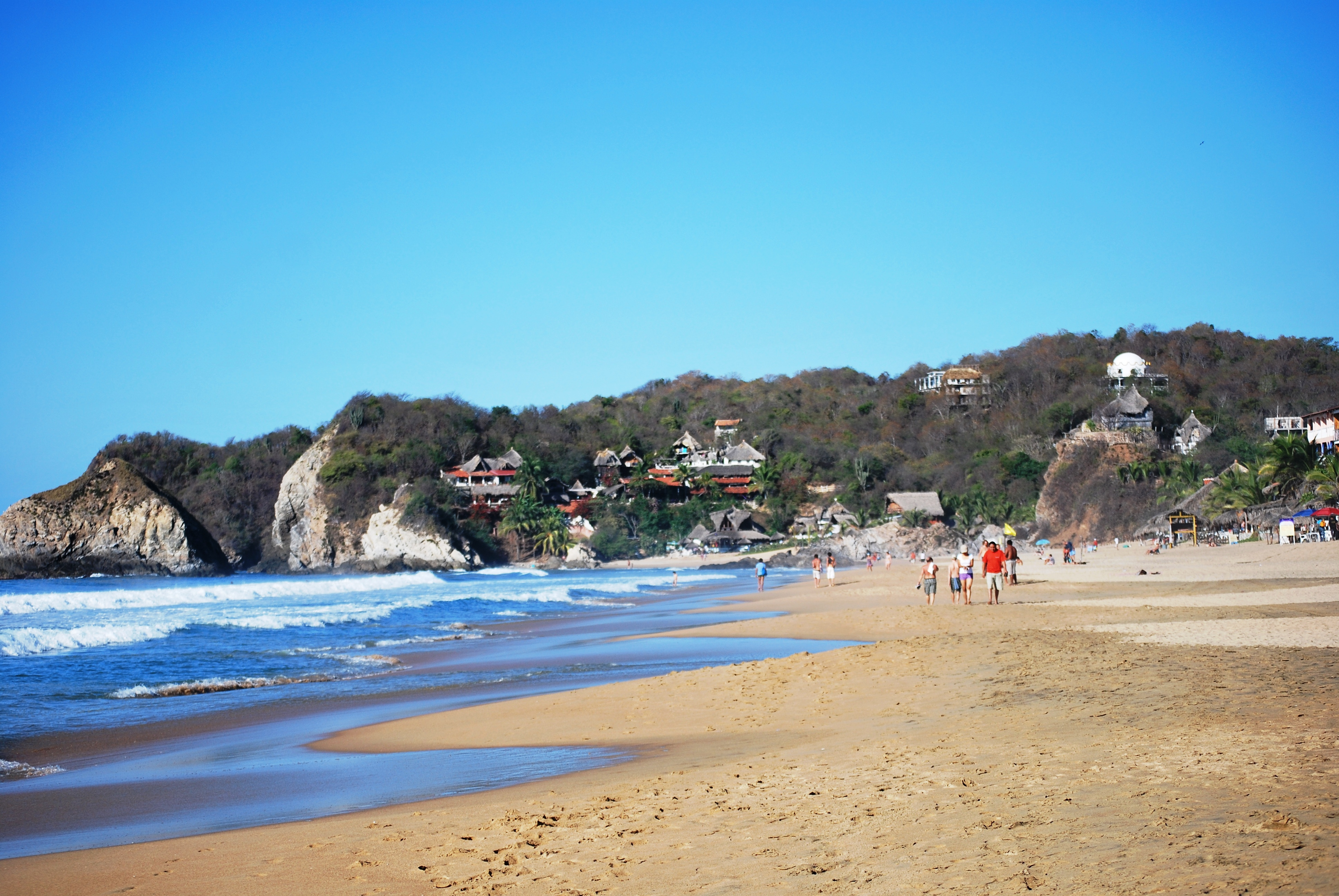
View of Zipolite Beach

The second most important zone for tourism is the coast especially from Puerto Escondido to Huatulco, with sandy beaches on the Pacific Ocean, dolphins, sea turtles, sea turtles and lagoons with water birds. Many beaches are nearly virgin with few visitors but several areas have been developed such as Puerto Escondido, Huatulco, Puerto Ángel, Zipolite, San Agustinillo and Mazunte. Huatulco has been developed to be a major resort by the Fondo Nacional de Fomento al Turismo (FONATUR) with its own international airport. It is located on about 35 km of coastline between Salinas Cruz and Puerto Escondido. The main feature is the bays called Santa Cruz, Cacaluta, El Maguey, La Entrega, Chahué, Tangolunda, Los Conejos, Río Copalita and San Agustín. The main resort covers 21,000 hectares with beaches of fine sand pressed against mountains and some luxury hotels.

Puerto Escondido is an important destination for tourism from within Mexico with beaches such as Playa Carrizillo. It also attracts international surfers to Zicatela Beach, where an annual surfing competition is held. There are also areas here that are promoted for ecotourism. One of these is the Lagunas de Chacahua National Park. It consists of 14,267 hectares surrounding oceanside lagoons named Chacahua and Pastoría. It also contains a number of rivers, beaches, mangroves, rainforest and grasslands. Wildlife includes 136 species of birds, 23 of reptiles, 4 amphibians and twenty types of mammals. Another important lagoon area is Manialtepec, located near Puerto Escondido.

The teacher's strike of 2006, and the violence associated with it, had a major negative impact on tourism to the Central Valleys regions. The Oaxaca city airport canceled 200 flights a month at its height and a total loss of 7.6 million pesos. Much of this loss occurred because the strikes occurred in the summertime, when most tourists come to the area, especially for the very important Guelaguetza festival. Some impact was felt in the coastal area as well, but it was quicker to recover.
