= Loxicha =

Loxicha may refer to:

== Places in Oaxaca, Mexico ==
- Candelaria Loxicha
- San Agustín Loxicha
- San Baltazar Loxicha
- San Bartolomé Loxicha
- Santa Catarina Loxicha

== Languages ==
- Loxicha Zapotec
- San Baltázar Loxicha Zapotec
