= Miss Oaxaca =

- Formation: 2016
- Type: Beauty pageant
- Headquarters: Oaxaca
- Location: Mexico
- Local Coordinator: Octavio Chávez

Miss Oaxaca is a state-level contest in the state of Oaxaca, Mexico, which selects the state representative for the national contest Miss México, thus aspiring to represent the country internationally on one of the platforms offered.

The state organization has achieved the following results since 2016:

- 2nd Runner-up: 1 (2019)
- Top 16: 2 (2023)
- Unplaced: 3 (2016, 2017, 2018, 2021, 2025)

== National Queens ==
- Sara Cruz - Miss México Top Model of the World 2026 (Designated)
- Danna Larrañaga - Reina del Café México 2025 (Designated)
- Laura Mojica - Reina del Café México 2020 (Designated)

== International Queens ==
- Laura Mojica - Virreina Internacional del Café 2020

== Titleholders ==
The following are the names of the annual winners of Miss Oaxaca, listed in ascending order, as well as their results during the national Miss México pageant. State queens who represented the country in a current or past franchise of the national organization are also highlighted in a specific color.

Current Franchises:

- Competed at Miss World.
- Competed at Miss Supranational.
- Competed at Miss Cosmo.
- Competed at Miss Elite.
- Competed at Top Model of the World.
- Competed at Reina Internacional del Café.
- Competed at Reina Mundial del Banano.
- Competed at Miss Continentes Unidos.
- Competed at Miss Global City.

Former Franchises:

- Competed at Miss Grand International.
- Competed at Miss Costa Maya International.

Year	Titleholder	Hometown	Placement	Special Award	Notes
2026	Ivón Gabriela Ramírez Mendoza	Huajuapan de León	TBD		Competed at Miss Oaxaca 2025
2025	Sara Cruz Porras	Oaxaca	-	-	Competed at Top Model of the World 2026; Miss México Top Model of the World 2026; Top 14 at Embajadora México 2023; Embajadora Oaxaca 2023
2024	In 2024, due to changes in the dates of the national pageant, the election of the state queens was postponed for one year.				
2023	Danna Paola Ávalos Larrañaga	Guadalajara	Top 16	-	Top 12 at Reinado Internacional del Café 2025; Reina del Café México 2025; 1st Runner-up at Miss Jalisco 2023; Was born and raised in Jalisco
2022	In 2022, due to changes in the dates of the national pageant, the election of the state queens was postponed for one year.				
2021	Johana Castro Ortega	Matías Romero	-	-	Top 8 at Miss México Elite 2023; Competed at Mexicana Universal Oaxaca 2018; Miss Earth Oaxaca-Water 2020
2020	In 2020, due to the contingency of COVID-19 there was a lag in the year of the state contest				
2019	Sabrina Góngora	Puerto Escondido	2nd Runner-up	Miss Top Model	Reina del Mundo México 222
2018	Naomi Estefanía Rueda López (Resigned)	Salina Cruz	-	-	-
2018	Laura Mojica Romero (Assumed)	Tuxtepec	-	-	Virreina Internacional del Café 2020; Reina del Café México 2020; 2nd Runner-up at Miss Méxic Grand 2019; Miss Heritage México 2015; Miss Earth México-Air 2015; Miss Earth Oaxaca 2015
2017	Antonia Minerva Gopar Santos	Ejutla de Crespo	-	-	-
2016	Mittzy Delfina Ruschke Lira	San Pedro Pochutla	-	-	Top 10 at Miss México Elite 2022; 2nd Runner-up at Belleza Internacional de las Fiestas Septembrinas 2013; Top 15 at Top Model of the World 2013; Miss México Top Model of the World 2012; Competed at Miss Intercontinental 2012; Miss México Intercontinental 2012; 2nd Runner-up at Nuestra Belleza Oaxaca 2012

== See also ==
- Mexicana Universal Oaxaca
