= San Pedro Pochutla =

Pochutla
- City & Municipality
- San Pedro Pochutla
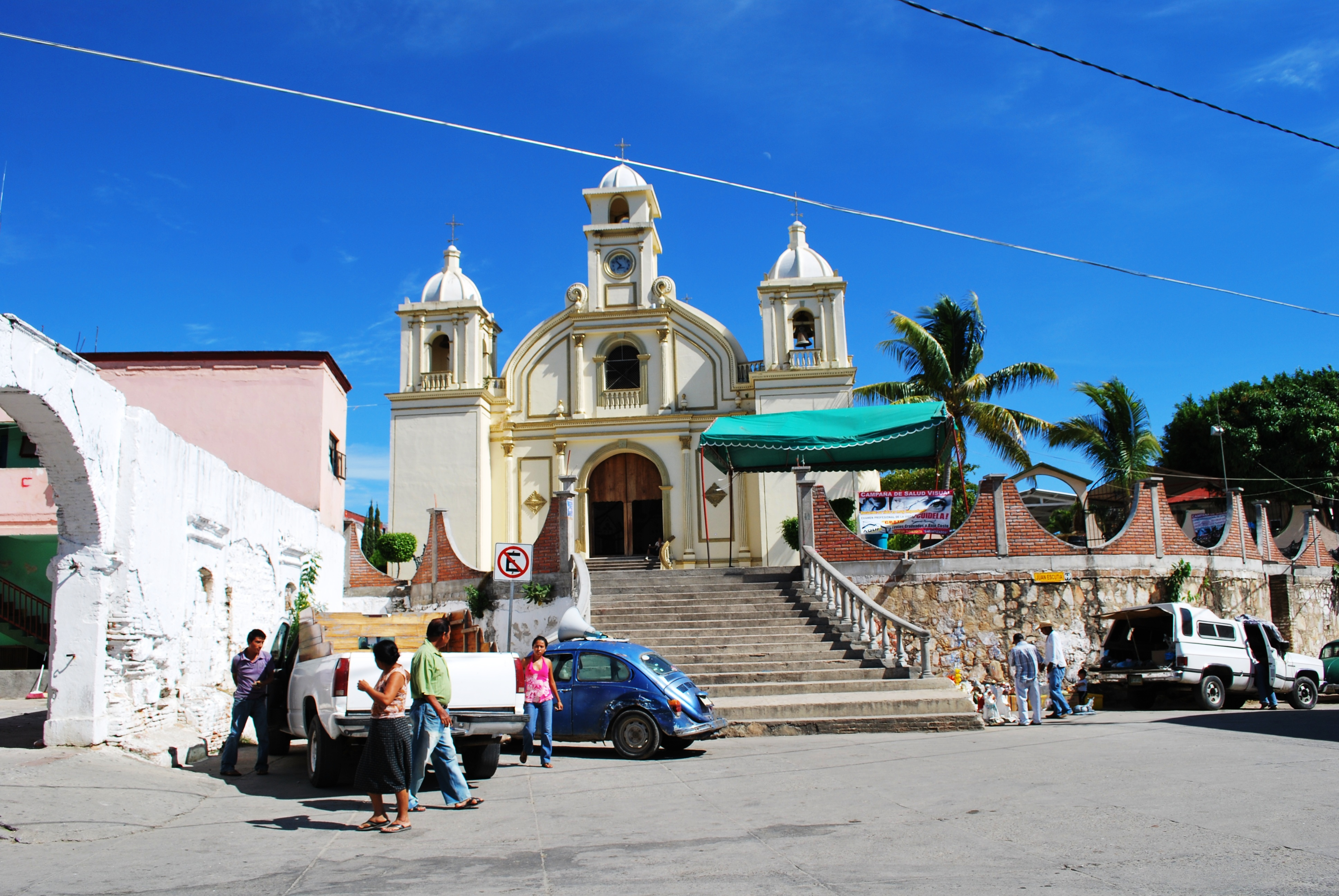
- Atrium and facade of the Church of San Pedro in Pochutla

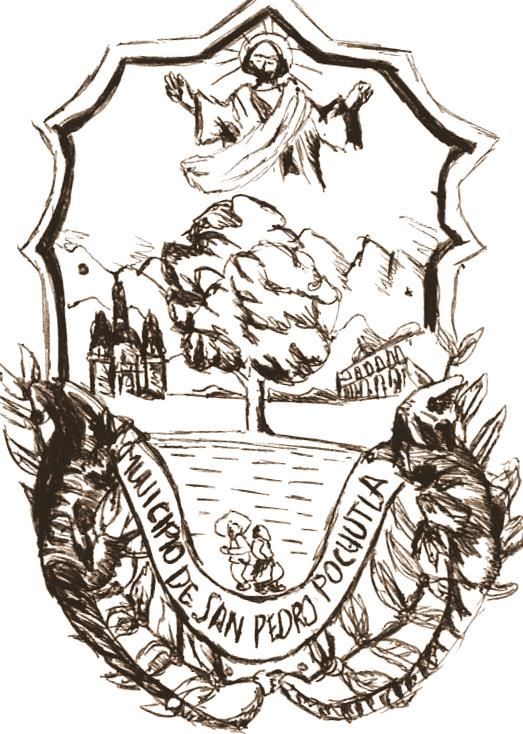
- Coat of arms

- Location within Oaxaca Location within Mexico
- Coordinates: 15°44′40″N 96°27′55″W
- Country: Mexico
- State: Oaxaca
- Founded: 700s

Government
  - Municipal President: José Manuel Ricardez López (2008–2010)

Area
  - Municipality: 421 km^{2} (163 sq mi)
- Elevation (of seat): 150 m (490 ft)

Population (2005) Municipality
  - Municipality: 38,798
  - Seat: 12,117
- Time zone: UTC-6 (Zona Centro)
- Postal code (of seat): 70900

San Pedro Pochutla is a city and municipality located in the south of Oaxaca state, in southeastern Mexico next to the Pacific Ocean and is the southernmost municipality in Oaxaca. It is an important commercial, transportation and administrative hub for the Pochutla District in the east of the Costa Region. Pochutla is located at the junction of coastal Highway 200 and Highway 175 to Oaxaca, with 175 functioning as the town's main thoroughfare. Its name means "place of kapok trees (Ceiba pentandra)", and most of the city is built on a lakebed which was drained during the colonial period. The municipality is best known as being the home of the oceanside communities of Puerto Ángel and Zipolite.

== History ==
The Pochutla area was settled by Zapotec tribes from Amatlán, Miahuatlán and Coatlan in the 8th century. The settlement now known as Pochutla was founded around the same time as nearby Loxicha, Cozoaltepec and others. The area was part of the dominion of Tututepec. By the postclassic period, the main language was Pochutec, closely related to Nahuatl and named after this settlement. The people of Pochutla were said to have given offerings and sacrifices to the goddess Itzpapalotl and to have practiced cannibalism.

At the time of the Spanish conquest, the Spanish town of Pochutla was founded by Pedro Molina, Isidro Salinas, Julio Diaz and others, initially with the name of Huehuetan. The locals were converted to Christianity and the first church was founded just south of the modern town and called San Pedro Huehuetán Laguna. Much of the modern city is built on what was a lakebed. Because of illnesses such as malaria and yellow fever, this lake was drained. Later in the colonial period, the name was changed to Pochutla due to the number of kapok trees in the area.

According to tradition and archeological evidence located in the hills of Vigía, Espino and El Cometa, there were arms hidden here by pirates, who were called Pichilingües.

In 1833, Conservative rebels led by General Valentín Canalizo fled through here as they were pursued by government troops. Their last battle was at the nearby Soledad Ranch in which they were destroyed by federal forces, forcing the remaining soldiers to scatter.

Conservative rebels continued to be active in this region until the 1860s with José Eustaquio Manzano and Apolonio Manzano leading the rebel cause, reinvigorated due to the passage of the Reform Laws. In 1858 and 1859, federal forces were dispatched here to subdue the rebels who had taken to guerrilla warfare. The last battle between the Manzano brothers and federal troops took place in 1860, with the brothers captured and taken to the state capital in 1861. The municipality has a petroleum reserve called Aragón, five km from the community of Puerto Angel. The deposit was going to be exploited by an English company, who brought over equipment in 1937, but expropriation of oil in 1938 by President Lázaro Cárdenas brought this to a halt. It has yet to be tapped.

Until late in the 20th century, much of the population of the area lived on subsistence farming, with the only work available during the harvest season on the coffee plantations. In the 1970, the state government expropriated most of the coastal land from Zipolite to Zapotengo and made it ejido or communal land with the aim of development. During the 2006 teachers strike in the state of Oaxaca, groups supporting and opposing the strike clashed here on the main road, Highway 175. The highway was blocked by those supporting the strike to prevent those opposing it from realizing their "March for Education." The highway was blocked with busses and cars preventing those bound for the state capital from leaving.

Other recent strikes include those by taxi drivers and others in transportation who have blocked roads resulting in monetary losses for the municipality. The dispute centered on concessions for passenger transportation between Pochutla and beach communities such as Zipolite. Actions by strikers have included the blockage of roads including coastal Highway 200.

== The city ==
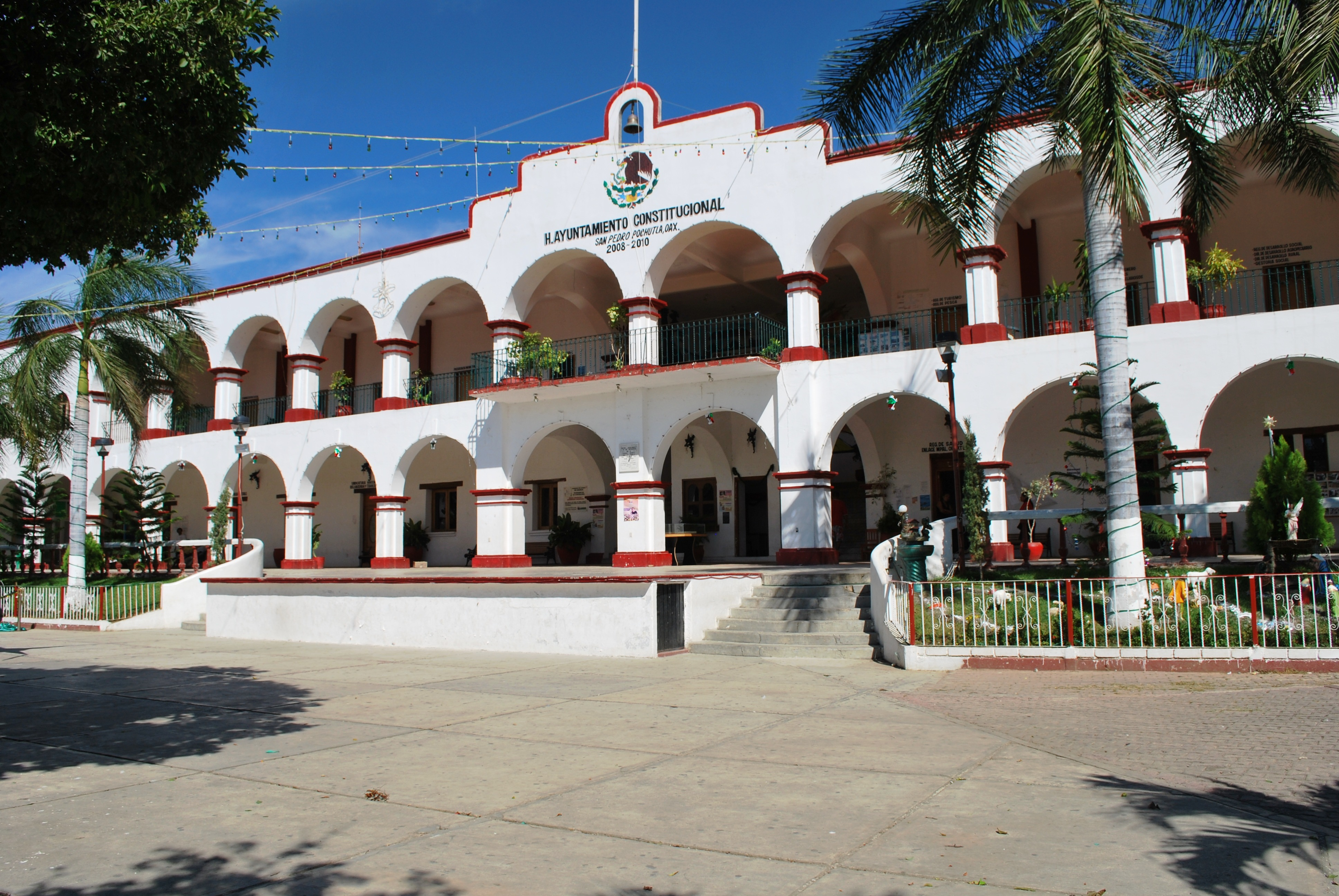
Municipal Palace

The city is the commercial, transportation and administrative center for the area. It contains banks, supermarkets and specialty stores that serve the coastal and isolated mountain communities of the Sierra Madre de Oaxaca which generally lack these things. The city is on the crossroads of Highway 175, which connects Oaxaca city with Puerto Angel and coastal Highway 200 that connects communities such as Puerto Angel, Puerto Escondido, Oaxaca, Huatulco and Salina Cruz. It is a transportation hub filled with buses, taxis and dust. Taxis called "colectivos" (collectives) go to the area's beaches as well as pickup trucks fitted to carry passengers. There are two bus stations with first and second class buses to Oaxaca city, Mexico City and Huatulco.

It is not a tourist attraction but it serves tourists as a place for banking services and supplies not available in the beach communities as well as a transfer point for buses. In the evening, the main road through town has a variety of street food. The parish church was begun in 1840 but was not finished until 1957. The municipal palace was built in 1873. The center, especially the main plaza and the municipal palace, has recently been renovated and a new amphitheatre has been built to host cultural and sporting events. The patron saint's day is 29 June in which people celebrate with masks, and fireworks, some set in frames called "castles."

Pochutla gained the title of city in March 2003. It is the seat of the Pochutla District, and is also the head of the Parish of Pochutla which oversees 39 other communities.

== The municipality ==
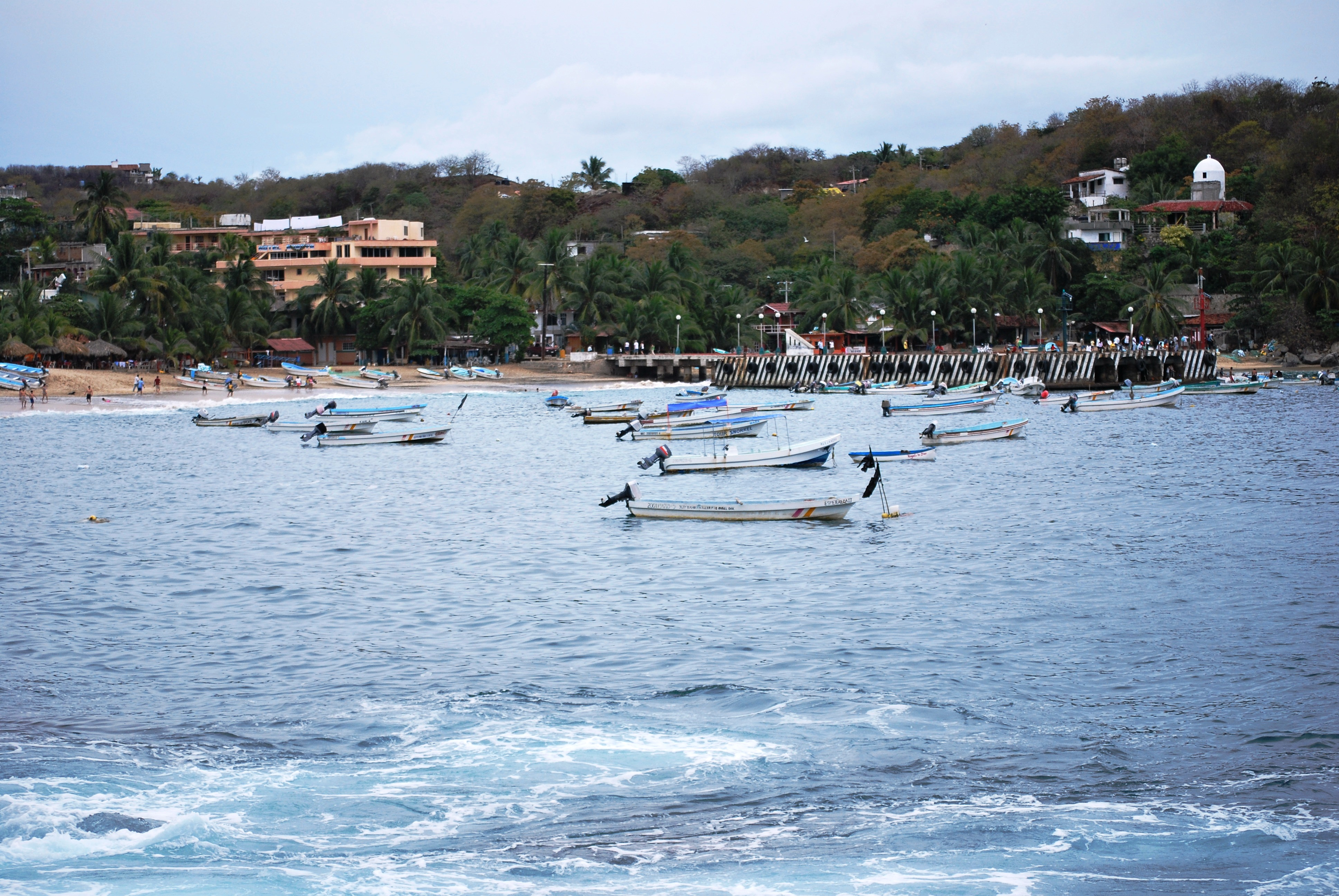
View of Puerto Angel's wharf

As municipal seat, the city of San Pedro Pochutla is the governing authority over 238 other named communities, with a total area of 421km2. This municipality has a total population of 38,798 of which 12,117 live in the city proper. The most important communities other than the seat include Puerto Angel and Zipolite, both of which are oceanside communities. Zipolite is a popular tourist attraction and Puerto Angel was a coffee export port whose economy now is based on tourism and fishing. Other beaches include La Mina, where waves crash noisily against rocks and Zapotengo with has miles of coconut groves next to the sand. There is also a fresh water spring in San José Chacalapa. The municipality borders Candelaria Loxicha, Pluma Hidalgo, Santa María Huatulco, Cozoaltepec and Santo Domingo with the Pacific Ocean to the south.

The climate here is hot and humid due to its proximity to the ocean with a rainy season in the summer. Average temperatures vary between 30 and 38C. The south of the municipality is oceanfront and the north is formed by mountains of the Sierra Madre de Oaxaca. Various rivers pass through here on their way to the Pacific Ocean even more arroyos filling during the summer rainy season. Most of the rain falls in the mountains areas of the municipality rather than on the coast. Principal elevations include Vigia and Espino from which the main river flows. Despite the drainage of the principal lake, malaria is still a concern here. Vegetation is of the tropical and sub-tropical types and include a number of valuable tropical wood trees such as huanacastle, mahogany, cedar and Guaiacum coulteri, which are primarily used to make furniture. Common wildlife includes iguanas, deer, wild boar, armadillos, rabbits, raccoons and numerous birds native to the area. Coastal species include black coral, turtles sea bass, sharks and crabs, with bass, mojarra and shrimp found in the rivers.

The principal cultivated crop here is coffee, which provides most of the employment of the rural population. This is raised in the mountain areas. Second is the raising of coconuts and products based on it such as coconut oil. Another important crop is mangos. Other crops grown include corn, sesame seed, peanuts, limes, plums, bananas, watermelons and other melons. About 50% of the total population is dedicated to commerce, especially that related to tourism. About 22% is dedicated to mining, petroleum, and industry.

A number of traditions are maintained, mostly in the rural areas. In rural communities, various dialects of the Zapotec language are still spoken. Crafts include figures carved from coconuts, in the regional penitentiary are made necklaces and figures from black coral, wood and other materials. Traditional dress until recently consisted of loose fitting white pants and shirts made of lightweight canvas but this has mostly given way to modern clothing especially in the city. However, older women can still be seen in canvas blouses, rebozos, sandals and wearing long braids. Local specialties include iguana tamales and venison in yellow or red mole. Traditional music includes songs called “sones” and chilenas. Local “sones” include titles such as El Perro, El Arriero, El Borracho, El Zopilote, El Toro and El Panadero. Dance garb for women includes long, wide skirts and blouses in various bright colors adorned with ribbons and with the blouses embroidered with flowers. Accessories include rebozos, sandals and palm-leaf hats. The men wear white pants and shirts with sandals and palm-leaf hats. Most of the dances have themes relating to flirting and falling in love. A dance called the “Kirio” is performed at weddings.

In Puerto Ángel, the Universidad del Mar (University of the Sea) was founded in 1991 by Heladio Ramírez López, governor of the state of Oaxaca.
