= Nuestra Belleza Oaxaca 2011 =

- Date: June 3, 2011
- Presenters: Vielka Valenzuela, Javier Campos
- Entertainment: Motel
- Venue: Teatro Macedonio Alcalá, Oaxaca, Oaxaca
- Broadcaster: Televisa
- Entrants: 6
- Placements: 3
- Winner: Teresa Raviela; Río Grande

Nuestra Belleza Oaxaca 2011 was held in the Teatro Macedonio Alcalá in Oaxaca, Oaxaca, on June 3, 2011. At the conclusion of the final night of competition, Teresa Raviela of Río Grande was crowned the winner. Raviela was crowned by outgoing Nuestra Belleza Oaxaca titleholder, Alejandra Scherenberg. Six contestants competed for the title.

== Results ==
=== Placements ===
Final results	Contestant
Nuestra Belleza Oaxaca 2011	Teresa Raviela
Suplente / 1st Runner-up	Mariana Mejía
2nd Runner-up	Ana Yaret Alderete

=== Special awards ===
Award	Contestant
Miss Photogenic	Mariana Mejía
Miss Sports	Hilda Higuareda

== Judges ==
- Ofelia Correa - National Coordinator of Nuestra Belleza México
- Luis Moya - Dermatologist
- Jordie Avendaño - Photographer
- James Preston - Actor

== Background music ==
- Motel

== Contestants ==
Hometown	Contestant	Height (m)	Age
Puerto Escondido	Guadalupe Reyes Soriano	1.70	23
Río Grande	María Teresa Raviela Guerrero	1.74	19
Salina Cruz	Ana Yaret Alderete Meraz	1.69	20
Tuxtepec	Hilda Victoria Higareda Arano	1.72	18
Oaxaca City	Karla Samantha Antonio Pérez	1.69	20
Oaxaca City	Mariana Mejía Osante	1.74	19

== Contestant notes ==
- Mariana Mejía was also first runner-up in Nuestra Belleza Oaxaca 2010. She was elected as Miss Earth Oaxaca 2011 in a private casting with expectations to participate in Miss Earth México 2011 but for different reasons she did not compete, taking place Alejandra Sandoval Villaseñor.
- Samantha Antonio planned to compete in Nuestra Belleza Oaxaca 2012.
