= La Crucecita, Oaxaca =

La Crucecita
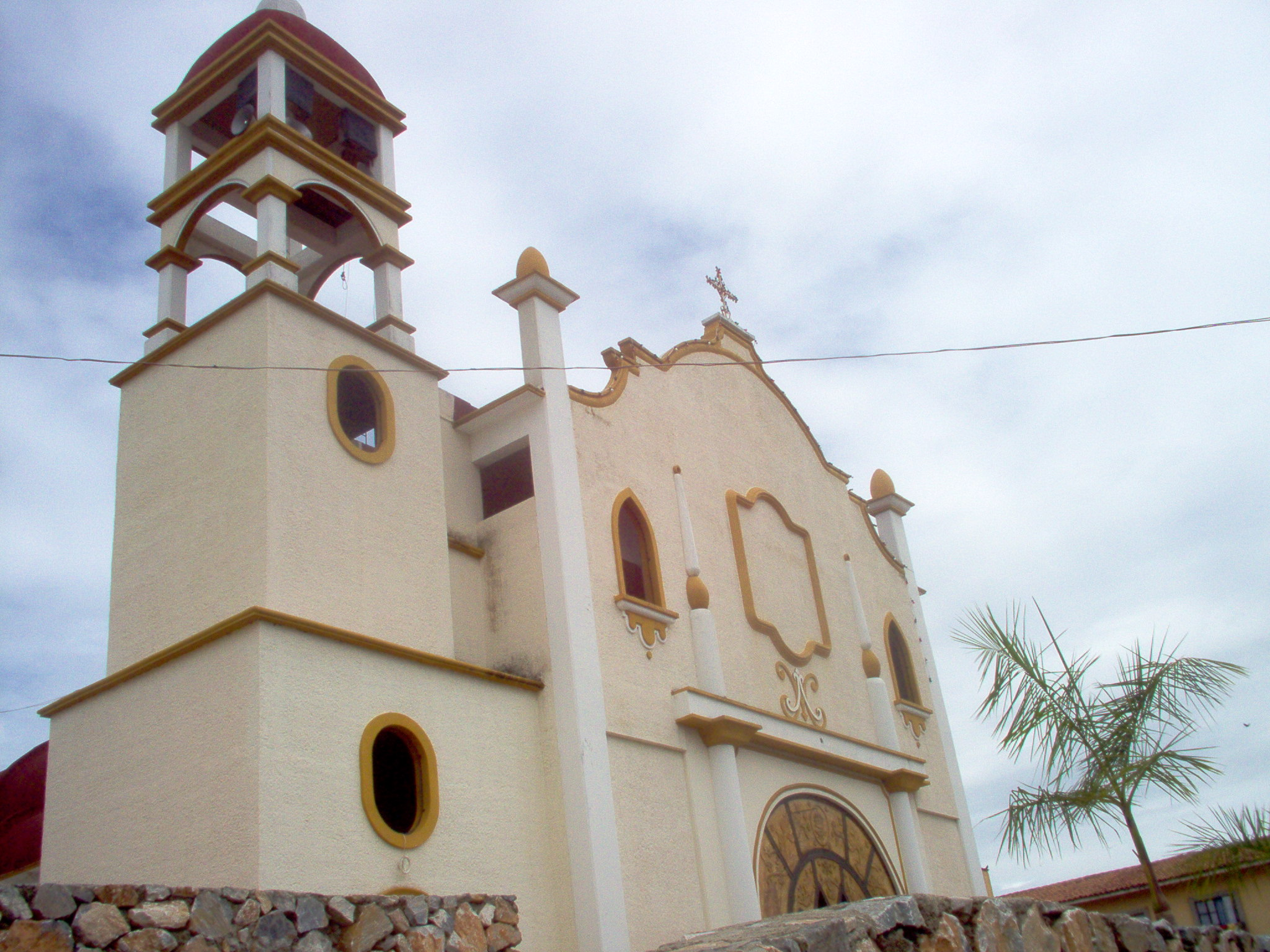
- La Parroquia Nuestra Señora de Guadalupe y de la Santa Cruz Church

- Location within Mexico
- Coordinates: 15°46′31″N 96°8′33″W
- Country: Mexico
- State: Oaxaca
- Municipality: Santa María Huatulco
- Elevation: 15 m (49 ft)

Population (2020)
  - Total: 19,252
- Time zone: UTC-6 (CST)
- Postal code: 70989

La Crucecita, along with Tangolunda and Santa Cruz, comprise the resort area known as Huatulco, in the Mexican state of Oaxaca. It is the community closest to the bays but it is only 4 km (2.5 mi) from Federal Highway 200. It has grown along with the development of tourism in the area. The town is within the Santa María Huatulco municipality, which is part of the Pochutla District in the Costa Region of Oaxaca, Mexico.

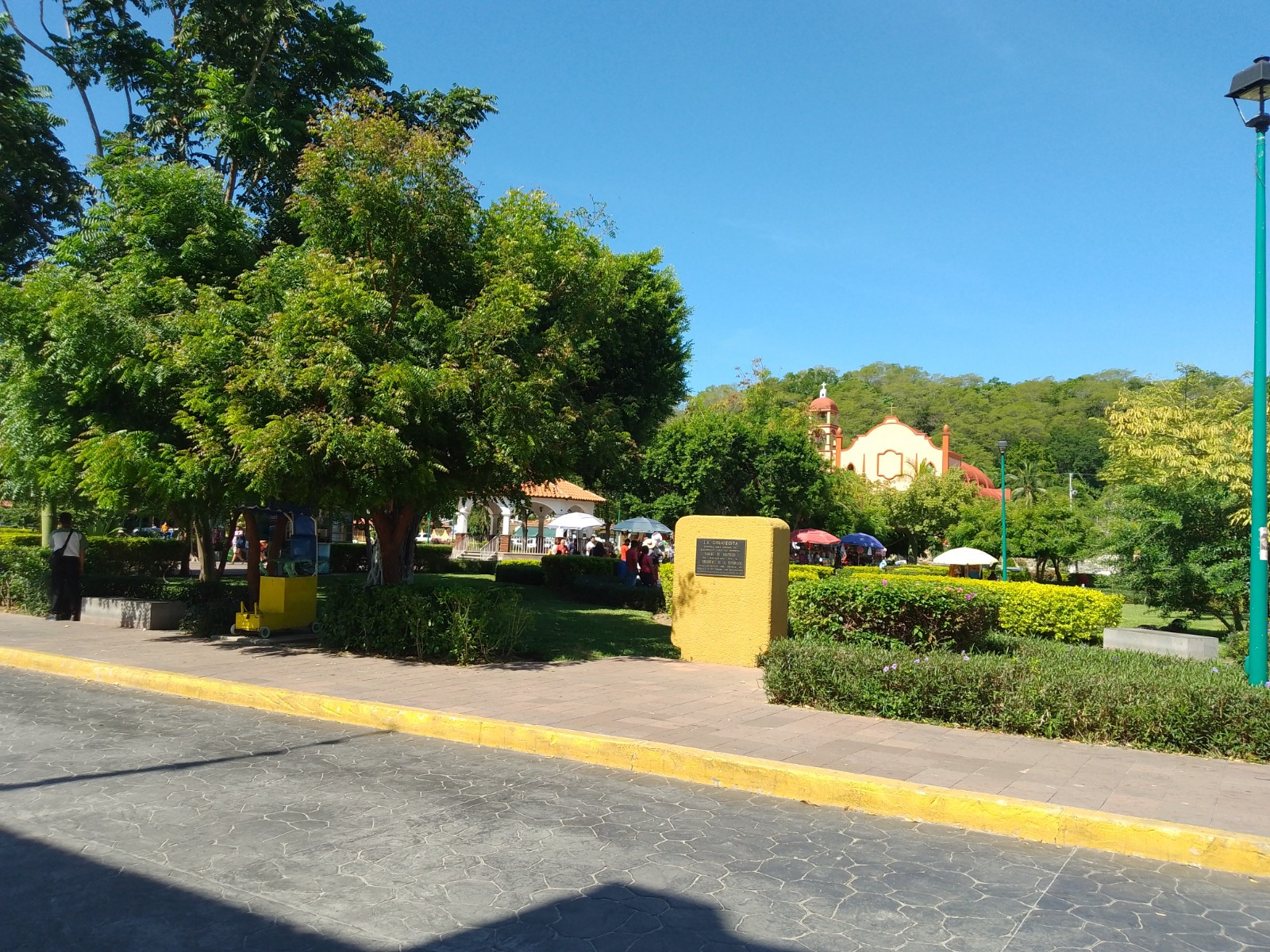
The park in the center of La Crucecita

The town church, Parroquia Nuestra Señora de Guadalupe y de la Santa Cruz, is in front of the park in the center of town. In the cupola of the church is a 20-metre (66 ft) tall painting of the Virgin of Guadalupe, which is the largest in the world.
