= Nuestra Belleza Oaxaca 2010 =

- Date: May 22, 2010
- Venue: Hotel Barceló, Huatulco, Oaxaca
- Broadcaster: Televisa
- Entrants: 6
- Placements: 3
- Winner: Alejandra Scheremberg; Oaxaca City

Nuestra Belleza Oaxaca 2010, was held in Hotel Barceló, Huatulco, Oaxaca on May 22, 2010. At the conclusion of the final night of competition, Alejandra Scheremberg of the capital city Oaxaca was crowned the winner. Scheremberg was crowned by outgoing Nuestra Belleza Oaxaca titleholder, Denise Mendiola. Six contestants competed for the state title.

== Results ==
=== Placements ===
Final results	Contestant
Nuestra Belleza Oaxaca 2010	Alejandra Scheremberg
Suplente / 1st Runner-up	Mariana Mejía
2nd Runner-up	Jeffy Alegría

== Contestants ==
Hometown	Contestant	Age
Huatulco	Alejandra Ledezma	20
Oaxaca	Alejandra Díaz Scherenberg	22
Oaxaca	Jeffy Alegría Debernardi	18
Oaxaca	Mariana Mejía Osante	18
Oaxaca	Thalia Florian Sibaja	22
Región Istmo	Elizabeth Valdivieso Gurrió	19

== Contestants Notes ==
  - Mariana Mejía also she was Suplente/1st Runner-up in Nuestra Belleza Oaxaca 2011. She was elected as Miss Earth Oaxaca 2011 in a private casting with expectations to participate in Miss Earth México 2011 but for different reasons she will not compete, taking place Alejandra Sandoval Villaseñor.
