= Nuestra Belleza Oaxaca 2012 =

- Date: June 16, 2012
- Presenters: Gloria Calzada, Jan
- Entertainment: Alexander Acha
- Venue: Teatro "Macedonio Alcalá", Oaxaca, Oaxaca, Oaxaca
- Broadcaster: Televisa
- Entrants: 6
- Placements: 3
- Winner: Almudena Villasante; Oaxaca City

Nuestra Belleza Oaxaca 2012 was held at the Teatro "Macedonio Alcalá" in Oaxaca, Oaxaca, on June 16, 2012. At the conclusion of the final night of competition, Almudena Villasante from Oaxaca City was crowned the winner. Villasante was crowned by Lupita Jones, national director of Nuestra Belleza México. Six contestants competed for the title.

== Results ==
=== Placements ===
Final results	Contestant
Nuestra Belleza Oaxaca 2012	Almudena Villasante
Suplente / 1st Runner-up	Michelle Mendoza
2nd Runner-up	Mittzi Ruschke

=== Special awards ===
Award	Contestant
Miss Photogenic	Mitzy Ruscke
Miss Sports	Michelle Mendoza

== Judges ==
- Ofelia Correa - Regional coordinator of Nuestra Belleza México
- Marco Flavio Cruz - TV producer
- Roberto González - Doctor
- Jordi Avendaño - Photographer

== Background music ==
- Alexander Acha

== Contestants ==
Hometown	Contestant	Height (m)	Age
Asunción Ixtaltepec	Michelle Toledo Orozco	1.69	20
Palomares	Michelle Mendoza García	1.74	20
Oaxaca City	Karla Samantha Antonio Pérez	1.68	20
Oaxaca City	Almudena Villasante Palau	1.74	18
San Pedro Pochutla	Mittzy Delfina Ruschke Lira	1.72	19
Tehuantepec	María José García Sánchez	1.70	18

== Contestant notes ==
- Samantha Antonio competed in Nuestra Belleza Oaxaca 2011, but she didn't place.
