= Pochutla District =

- District
- Oaxaca regions and districts: Costa in the southwest

- Location within Oaxaca Location within Mexico
- Coordinates: 15°44′N 96°28′W
- Country: Mexico
- State: Oaxaca
- Region: Costa

Area
  - Total: 3,773.29 km^{2} (1,456.88 sq mi)

Population (2020)
  - Total: 227,742

Pochutla District is located in the east of the Costa Region of the State of Oaxaca, Mexico and the southernmost district in Oaxaca. The primary city is San Pedro Pochutla.

== Municipalities ==
Pochutla municipalities

The district includes the following municipalities:

Municipality code	Name	Population		Land Area			Population density	
Municipality code	Name	2020	Rank	km^{2}	sq mi	Rank	2020	Rank
012	Candelaria Loxicha	11,166	7	181	70	7	62/km^{2} (160/sq mi)	7
071	Pluma Hidalgo	3,255	11	103.2	39.8	13	32/km^{2} (82/sq mi)	9
085	San Agustín Loxicha	26,194	4	335.7	129.6	6	78/km^{2} (202/sq mi)	4
113	San Baltazar Loxicha	3,169	12	120.9	46.7	11	26/km^{2} (68/sq mi)	11
117	San Bartolomé Loxicha	2,213	13	156.2	60.3	9	14/km^{2} (37/sq mi)	13
253	San Mateo Piñas	2,021	14	161.8	62.5	8	12/km^{2} (32/sq mi)	14
266	San Miguel del Puerto	8,551	8	519.3	200.5	2	16/km^{2} (43/sq mi)	12
306	San Pedro El Alto	4,654	9	74.47	28.75	14	62/km^{2} (162/sq mi)	6
324	San Pedro Pochutla	48,204	2	444.9	171.8	4	108/km^{2} (281/sq mi)	1
366	Santa Catarina Loxicha	3,676	10	126.6	48.9	10	29/km^{2} (75/sq mi)	10
401	Santa María Colotepec	27,046	3	414.4	160.0	5	65/km^{2} (169/sq mi)	5
413	Santa María Huatulco	50,862	1	512.2	197.8	3	99/km^{2} (257/sq mi)	3
439	Santa María Tonameca	25,347	5	520.7	201.0	1	49/km^{2} (126/sq mi)	8
509	Santo Domingo de Morelos	11,384	6	105.3	40.7	12	108/km^{2} (280/sq mi)	2
	Distrito Pochutla	227,742	—	3,777	1,458.31	—	60/km^{2} (156/sq mi)	—
Source: INEGI

=== Largest cities ===
Largest cities or towns in Pochutla Distric Source:
Rank		Municipality	Pop.
1	La Crucecita	Santa María Huatulco	19,252
2	San Pedro Pochutla	San Pedro Pochutla	14,071
3	Brisas de Zicatela	Santa María Colotepec	10,632
4	Santa María Huatulco	Santa María Huatulco	10,504
5	Sector H3	Santa María Huatulco	4,837
6	Puerto Ángel	San Pedro Pochutla	2,991
7	Santa Catarina Loxicha	Santa Catarina Loxicha	2,983
8	San Agustín Loxicha	San Agustín Loxicha	2,780
9	San Francisco Cozoaltepec	Santa María Tonameca	2,645
10	Barra Copalita	San Miguel del Puerto	2,433

== Images of Pochutla District ==
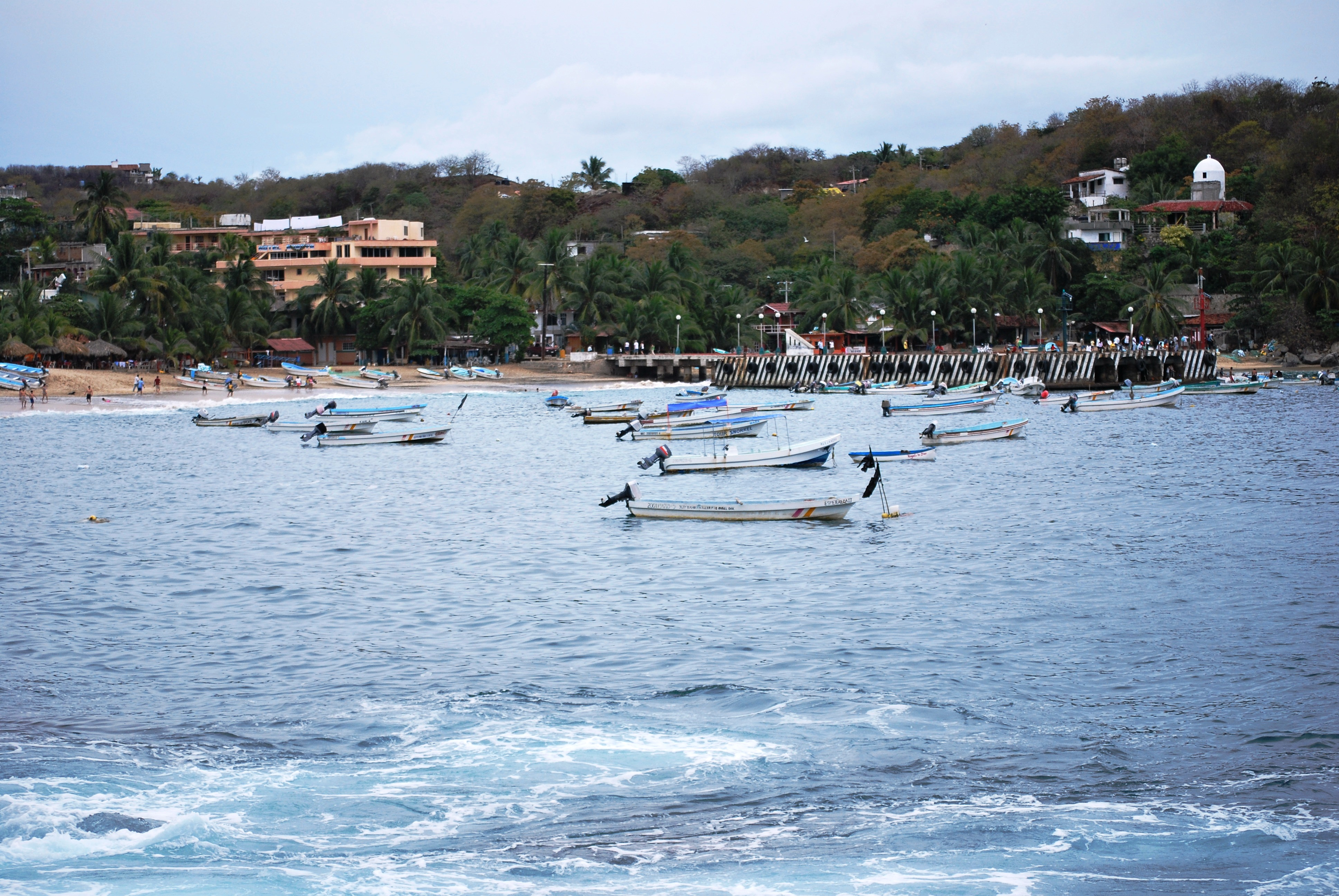
View of Puerto Angel's wharf

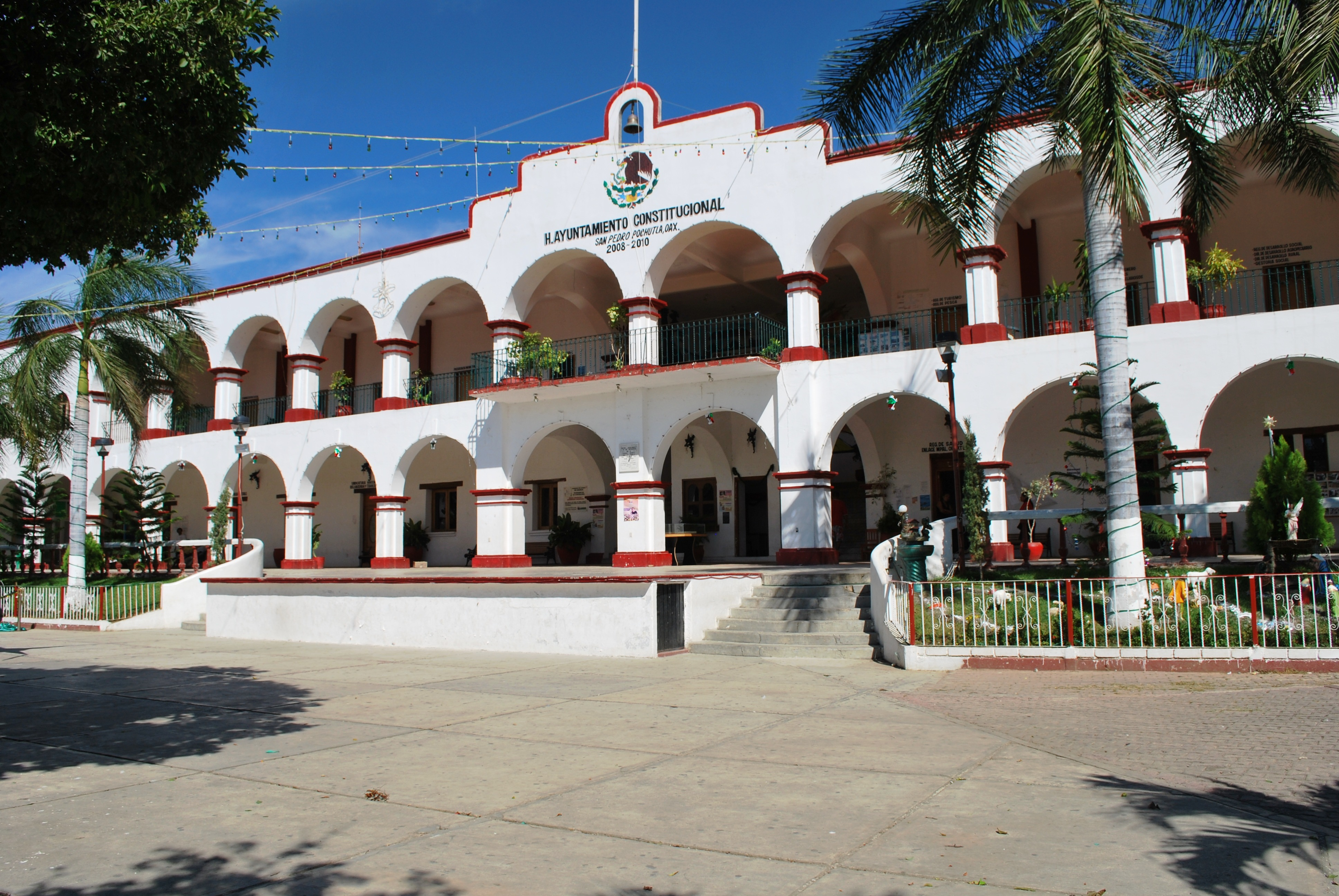
Municipal Palace, San Pedro Pochutla

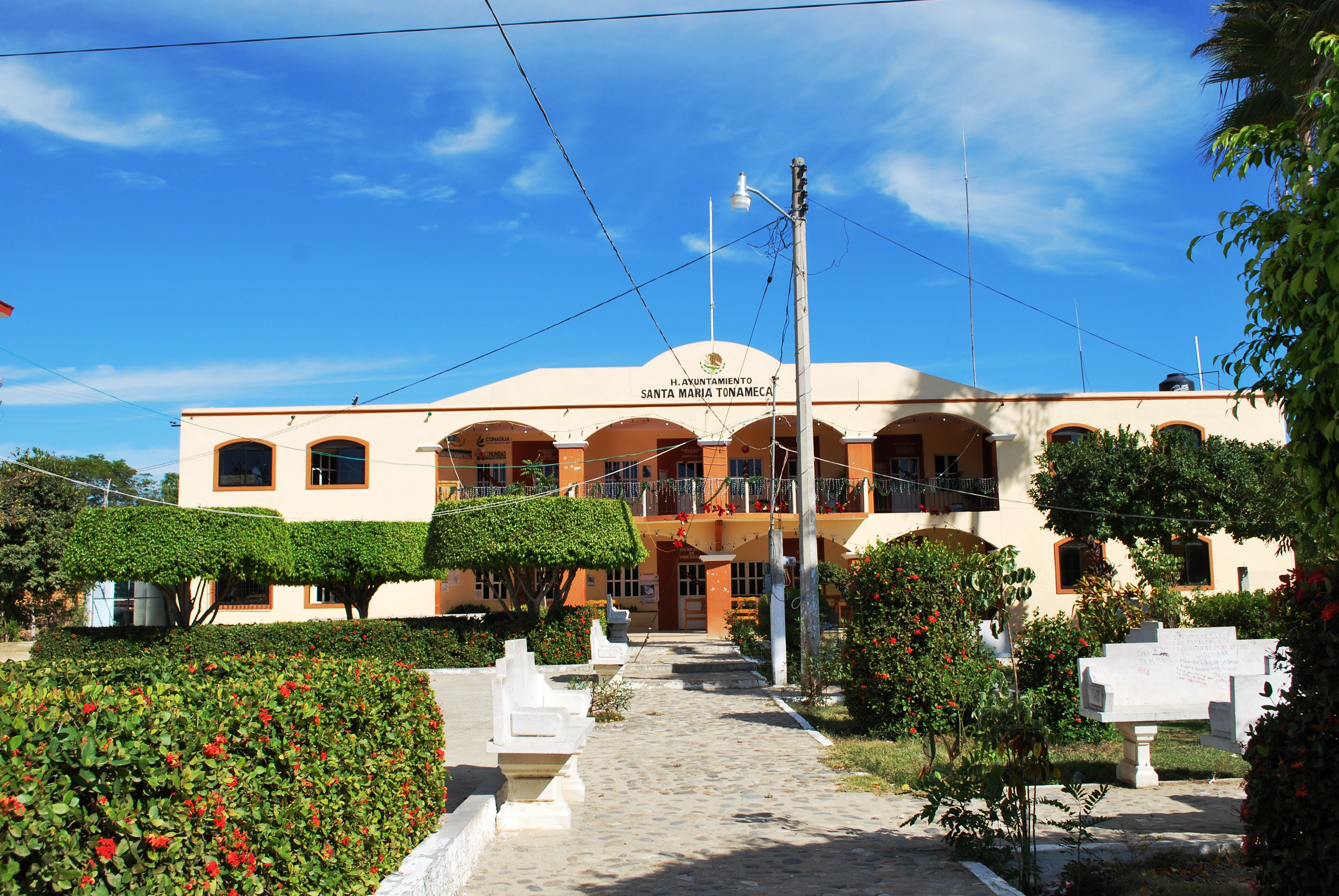
Municipal Palace, Santa María Tonameca

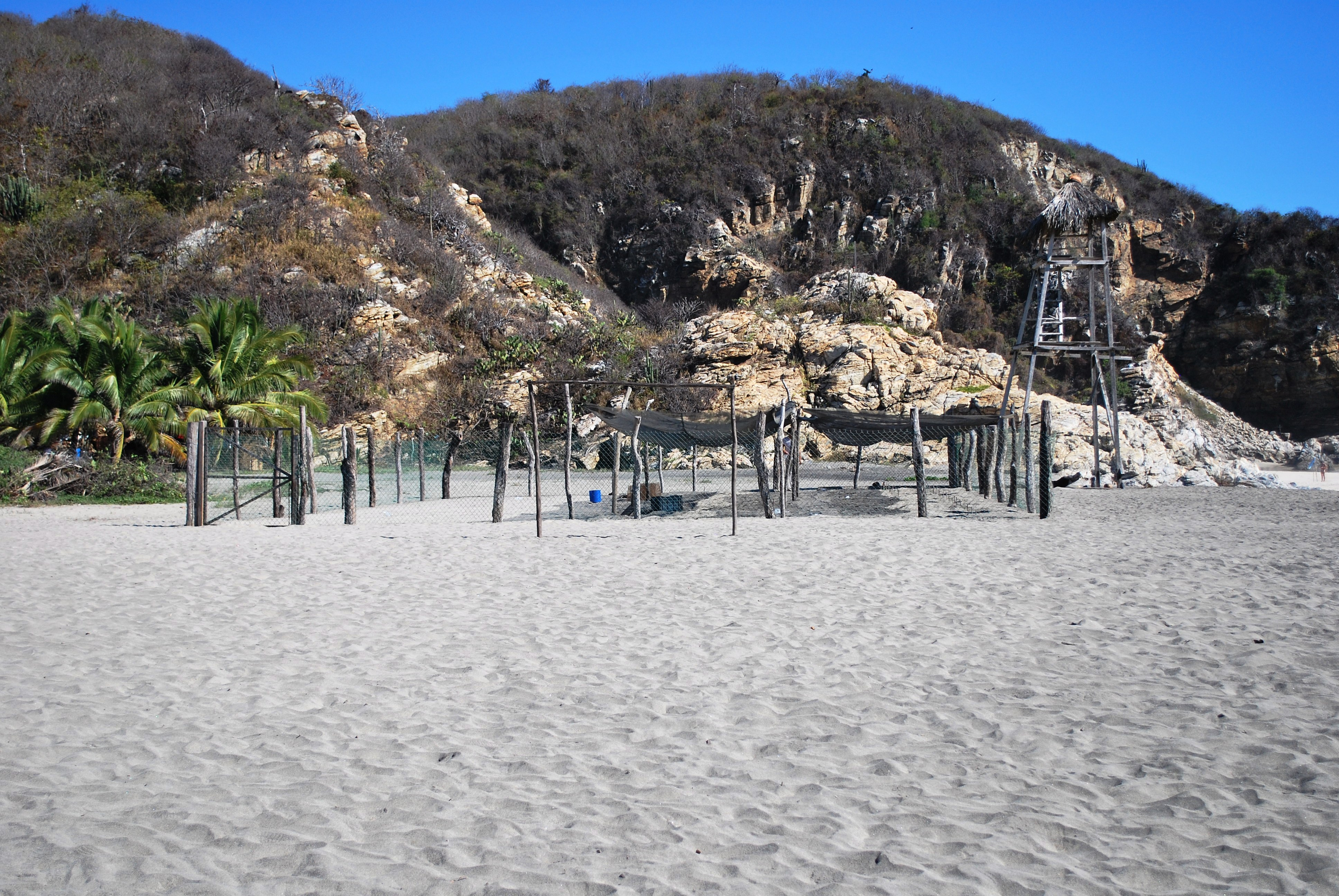
Protected turtle eggs incubating in La Ventanilla
