= Santo Domingo de Morelos =

Coordinates: 15°51′N 96°41′W

- Municipality and town
- Interactive map of Santo Domingo de Morelos
- Country: Mexico
- State: Oaxaca

Population (2005)
  - Total: 8,751
- Time zone: UTC-6 (Central Standard Time)

Santo Domingo de Morelos is a town and municipality in Oaxaca in south-western Mexico. The municipality covers an area of 107.17 km^{2}. It is part of the Pochutla District in the east of the Costa Region.

In 2005, the municipality had a total population of 8,751.
