= San Mateo Piñas =

- Municipality and town
- Location in Mexico
- Coordinates: 16°0′N 96°20′W
- Country: Mexico
- State: Oaxaca

Area
  - Total: 211.8 km^{2} (81.8 sq mi)

Population (2005)
  - Total: 2,647
- Time zone: UTC-6 (Central Standard Time)

San Mateo Piñas is a town and municipality in Oaxaca in south-western Mexico. The municipality covers an area of 211.8 km^{2}. It is part of the Pochutla District in the east of the Costa Region.

As of 2005, the municipality had a total population of 2,647.
