= Huatulco National Park =

National park in Oaxaca, Mexico

- Bahias de Huatulco
- IUCN category II (national park)
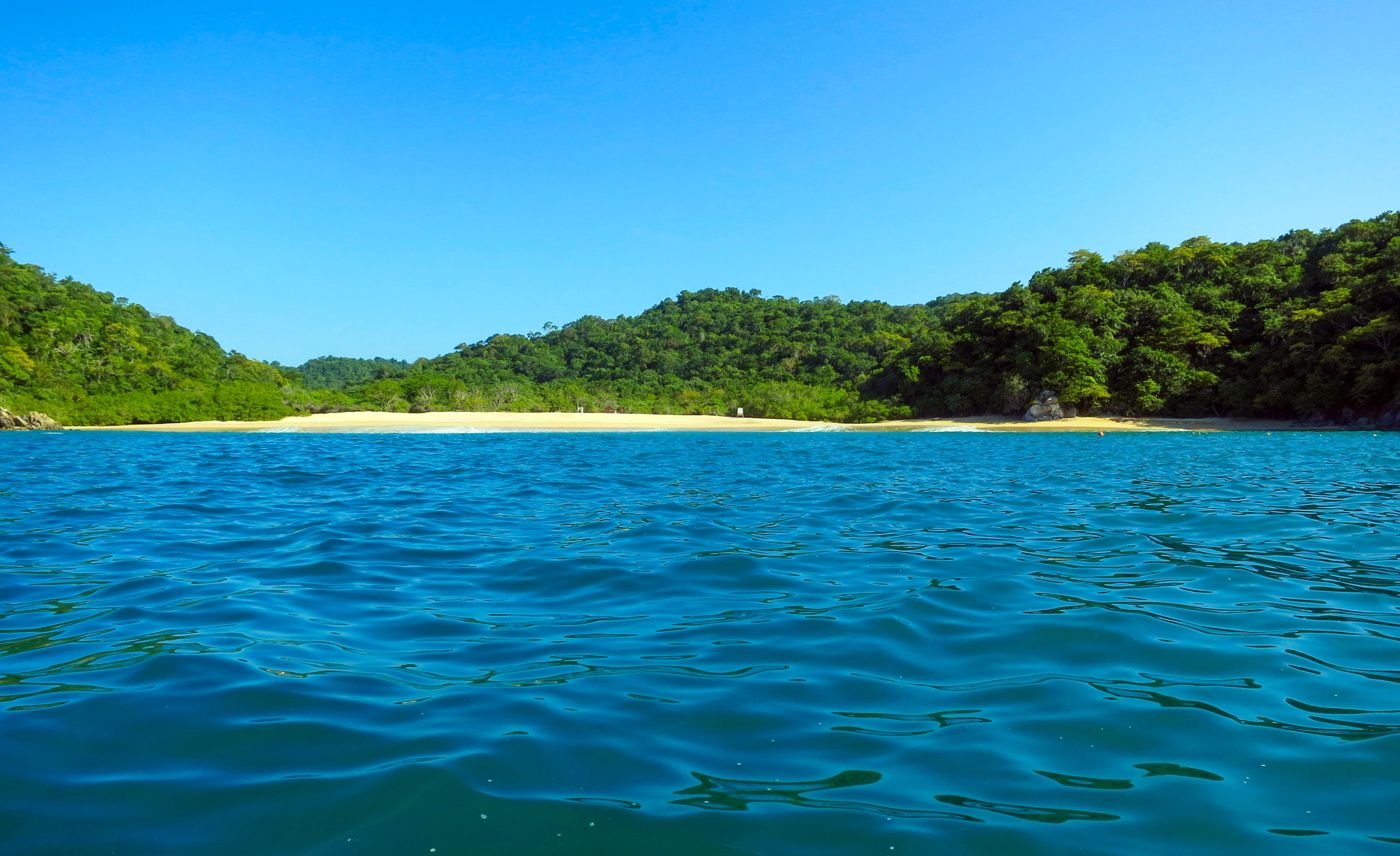
- Beach at Huatulco National Park, August 2012

- Location within Mexico
- Interactive map of Huatulco National Park
- Location: Oaxaca, Mexico
- Nearest city: Santa María Huatulco
- Coordinates: 15.714°N 96.195°W
- Area: 11,890 ha (29,400 acres)
- Established: 1998

Ramsar Wetland
- Official name: Cuencas y corales de la zona costera de Huatulco
- Designated: 27 November 2003
- Reference no.: 1321

Huatulco National Park, also known as Bahias de Huatulco National Park, is a national park of Oaxaca, Mexico. It was initially declared a protected area and later decreed as a National Park on July 24, 1998. Located in the Municipality of Santa María Huatulco, to the west of Cruz Huatulco, it extends to an area of 11,890 ha (29,400 acres).

== Flora and fauna ==
In the low lands of the park, there are 9,000 species of plants (about 50% of the species are reported throughout the country) in the forest and mangroves in the coastal belt. Vegetation is dominated by the low tropical dry forest in 80% of the area with the unusual feature of 50 ft (15 m) high trees.

Fauna species have been identified as 264, which includes armadillos and white-tailed deer. Bird species are counted at 701, which include hummingbirds, pelicans and hawks. The reptile species are counted to be 470, which include black iguana, salamanders and snakes. Dolphins, whales and turtles are sighted species off the coast line, out of the identified 100 amphibian species.
