= San Agustín Loxicha =

- Municipality and town
- Location in Mexico
- Coordinates: 16°01′N 96°37′W
- Country: Mexico
- State: Oaxaca

Area
  - Total: 389.1 km^{2} (150.2 sq mi)

Population (2005)
  - Total: 17,823
- Time zone: UTC-6 (Central Standard Time)

San Agustín Loxicha is a town and municipality in Oaxaca in south-western Mexico. The municipality covers an area of 389.1 km^{2}. It is part of the Pochutla District in the east of the Costa Region.

As of 2005, the municipality had a total population of 17,823.
