= Santa Catarina Loxicha =

- Municipality and town
- Location in Mexico
- Coordinates: 16°4′N 96°45′W
- Country: Mexico
- State: Oaxaca

Population (2020)
  - Total: 3,676
- Time zone: UTC-6 (Central Standard Time)

Santa Catarina Loxicha is a town and municipality in Oaxaca in south-western Mexico. The municipality covers an area of km^{2}. It is part of the Pochutla District in the east of the Costa Region

As of 2020, the municipality had a total population of 3,676.
