= San Miguel del Puerto =

- Municipality and town
- Location in Mexico
- Coordinates: 15°55′N 96°10′W
- Country: Mexico
- State: Oaxaca

Area
  - Total: 488.6 km^{2} (188.6 sq mi)

Population (2005)
  - Total: 7,510
- Time zone: UTC-6 (Central Standard Time)

San Miguel del Puerto is a town and municipality in Oaxaca in south-western Mexico. The municipality covers an area of 488.6 km^{2}. It is part of the Pochutla District in the east of the Costa Region.

As of 2005, the municipality had a total population of 7,510.
