= San Bartolomé Loxicha =

- Municipality and town
- Location in Mexico
- Coordinates: 15°58′N 96°42′W
- Country: Mexico
- State: Oaxaca

Area
  - Total: 191.4 km^{2} (73.9 sq mi)

Population (2005)
  - Total: 2,617
- Time zone: UTC-6 (Central Standard Time)

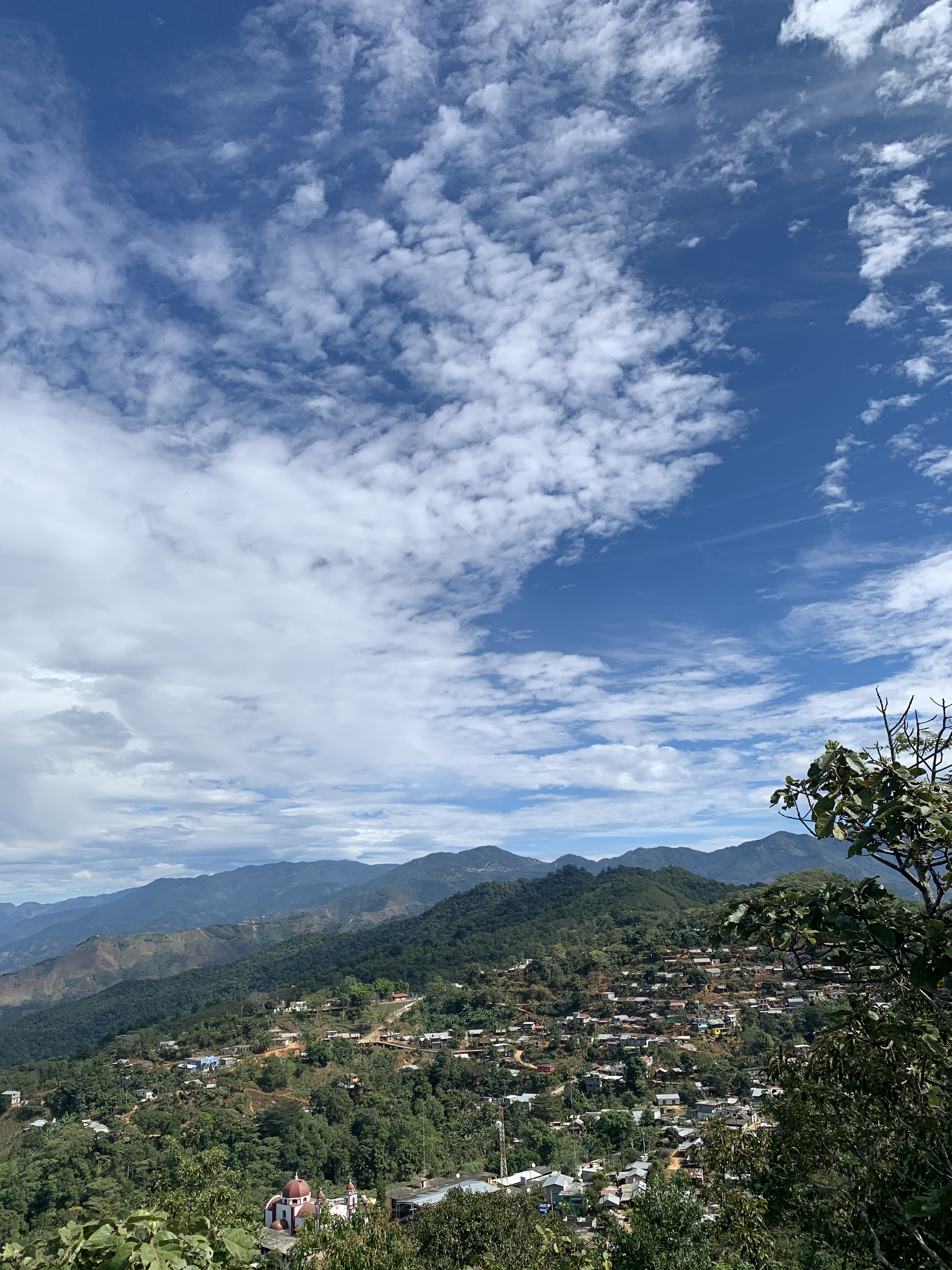

San Bartolomé Loxicha is a town and municipality in Oaxaca in south-western Mexico. The municipality covers an area of 191.4 km^{2}. It is part of the Pochutla District in the east of the Costa Region.

As of 2005, the municipality had a total population of 2,617.

Mayor Alejandro Hernández Santos was murdered on April 28, 2017.
