= Río Grande (Oaxaca) =

Location
- Country: Mexico

Physical characteristics
- Mouth
  - coordinates: 18°01′28″N 96°21′35″W

The Río Grande (Oaxaca) is a river of Mexico.

== See also ==
- List of rivers of Mexico
