= Huatulco =

Tourist development in Mexico

Coordinates: 15°51′N 96°20′W

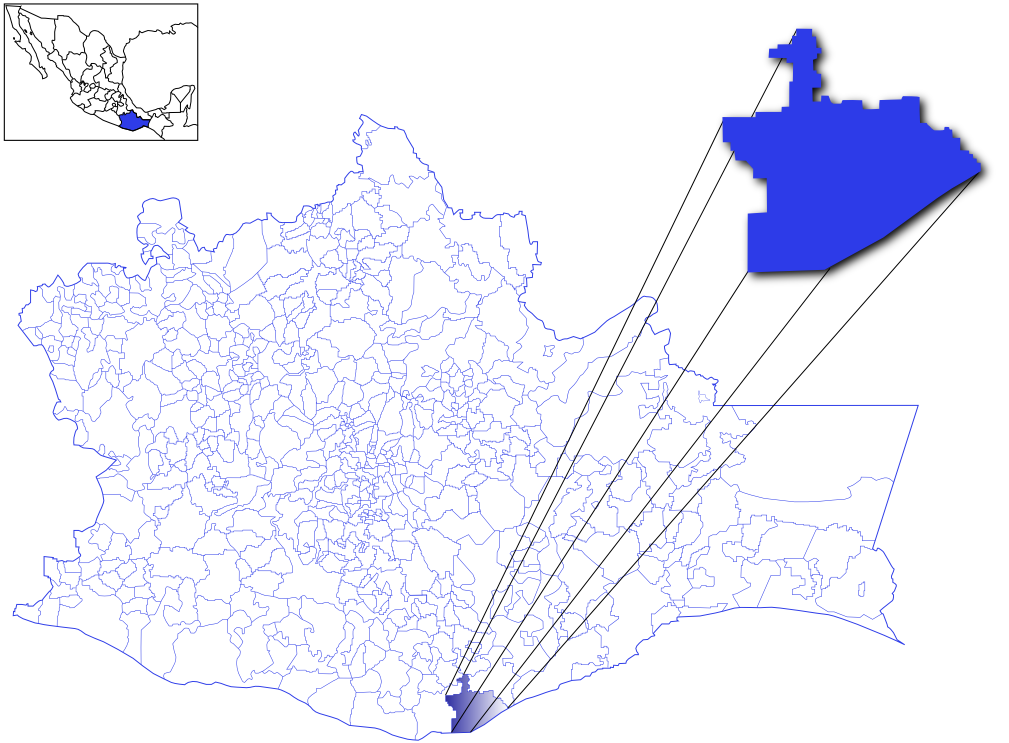
Location of Huatulco in Oaxaca

Huatulco (Spanish pronunciation: [wa'tulko]; wah-TOOL-coh), formally Bahías de Huatulco, centered on the town of La Crucecita, is a tourist development in Mexico. It is located on the Pacific coast in the state of Oaxaca. Huatulco's tourism industry is centered on its nine bays, thus the name Bahías de Huatulco, but has since been unofficially shortened to simply Huatulco. Huatulco has a wide variety of accommodation from rooms for rent, small economy hotels, luxury villas, vacation condominia, bed and breakfasts, as well as several luxury resorts standing on or near the shores of Tangolunda Bay. The Camino Real Zaashila (formerly the Omni Zaashila), Quinta Real Huatulco, Las Brisas (formerly a Club Med), Dreams Resort & Spa (formerly the Royal Maeva then the Gala hotel), and the Barceló (formerly the Sheraton hotel) are examples of the most popular larger resorts in the area.

Huatulco is located where the foothills of the Sierra Madre del Sur mountains meet the Pacific Ocean, approximately 400 kilometres (250 mi) east of Acapulco, Guerrero. The population is 50,000.

== History ==
Legends say the Toltecs and Cē Ācatl Topiltzin Quetzalcoatl came from this area. Quetzalcoatl, according to a later legend, erected an enormous and indestructible cross. Various people have passed through this area, including the Chatinos, the Zapotecs and the Mexicas, but by the postclassic period it was mainly inhabited by people speaking the Pochutec language which was closely related to Nahuatl. At the moment when the Spanish arrived, Huatulco was a tributary state of Tututepec. There was an idol called Coatepetl ("snake hill") and a temple where copal, feathers, precious stones, and blood were offered and animals and prisoners were sacrificed. According to early Spanish reports, merchants took textiles from Teotitlán del Camino to Soconusco and Suchitepéquez by canoe to trade for cacao.

After the Spanish Conquest, Huatulco thrived as a port under Hernán Cortés's control serving as a vantage point for Spanish galleons and a distribution centre for supplies on the Pacific coast. The latter half of the 16th Century saw Huatulco attacked by Francis Drake and Thomas Cavendish—both of whom left their prints on the region's history and legends that continue to this day.

Until resort development began in the 1980s, Huatulco was little known except as a coffee-growing area. In 1984, FONATUR (Fondo Nacional de Turismo), a government agency dedicated to the development of tourism in Mexico, acquired 21,000 hectares of land to develop a tourism center, similar to that in Cancún. The existing population was relocated to Santa María Huatulco. The plan resulted in the improvement of roadways and other infrastructure. It also has populated areas mixed with "green zones" to make the area ecologically friendlier.

In addition to the beaches, there are small communities of Bahias de Huatulco, such as Santa Cruz, La Crucecita, or old Santa María Huatulco (the municipal seat). Transportation between the communities is available by bus or taxi. The entire area has a small-town feel about it and is rarely crowded with tourists exception in the Christmas and Easter holiday periods.

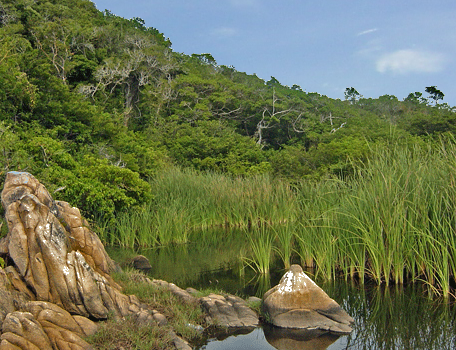
Huatulco's Cacaluta Bay

About 80% of all tourism in Bahias de Huatulco is domestic in nature. Only about 20% of Huatulco's tourism is foreign, mainly because international air access is limited. Bahias de Huatulco has a small international airport just 20 minutes from the main resorts in Tangolunda Bay. This airport has recently increased tourism, and helped to popularize the Pacific Coast backpacker route through Huatulco, Zipolite, Mazunte, and Puerto Escondido.The peak season for foreign tourism is typically from December through April.

Huatulco was declared a UNESCO Biosphere Reserve in 2006.

== Geography ==
Bahias de Huatulco is divided into four main districts. Tangolunda is the area where the large upscale resorts are located; Santa Cruz is a small town with the main marina and Santa Cruz beach; La Crucecita, is another small town just inland from the beach area which provides support services to the area, and Chahué is an area between Santa Cruz and Tangolunda.

The Bahias de Huatulco are a series of nine bays and numerous small coves stretching along 26 kilometers of jagged coastline, including 36 white sandy beaches. The most centrally located bay is Bahía de Santa Cruz, which is just south of the town of La Crucecita. It is also the center of commercial and tourist activities, with a large pier where cruise ships dock. Many resort offerings can be found here such as hotels, craft shops, discothèques, bars, restaurants, excursion agencies, sailboat excursions as well as scuba diving, snorkeling and jet skis for rent. The Capilla de Santa Cruz is where many weddings and baptisms are celebrated next to the sea. Playa Santa Cruz is the best known of the beaches here. It is 250 meters long, with soft white sand and turquoise blue water.

Heading east from Santa Cruz are the bays of Bahía Chahué, Bahía Tangolunda and Bahía Conejos. These are the more developed areas of Huatulco. Bahía Chahué is 2 km east of Santa Cruz and its name means "fertile or moist land" in Zapotec. It has a marina for large and small yachts along with three principal beaches; Chahué, Esperanza and Tejón. Even though these are wide beaches, their moderate surf makes them less-visited than those in Santa Cruz. Three km east of Chahué is Bahía Tangolunda, which has five beaches; Ventura, Manzanillo, Tornillo, Tangolunda and Rincón Sabroso. Here the water varies between cobalt blue and emerald green. Most of the larger hotels are located on this bay. Residencial Conejos is 4 km east of Tangolunda and has some of the larger residential homes in the area, some of which are vacation rentals. The mouth of the Río (River) Copalita is slightly east of Bahía Conejos and it has a long zone of beaches. To the east of Río Copalita are beaches stretching all the way to the Isthmus of Tehuantepec. Two of these beaches are Barra de la Cruz and Playa Mojon. Some great surfing waves can be found from these beaches. Barra de la Cruz is one of the best and easiest to access. Playa El Mojon can, at certain times of the year, have some decent waves for surfing and is also a great location to explore.

To the west of Santa Cruz, the beaches are less developed; in fact most of this area belongs to the Parque Nacional (National Park) Huatulco. This is a protected area (Área Natural Protegida) created in 1998. It contains 6,375 hectares of lowland jungle and 5,516 hectares of marine areas, encompassing the bays of Bahía Maguey, Bahía Órgano, Bahía Cacaluta, Bahía Chachacual and Bahía San Agustín. In these bays live the most important coral communities of the Mexican Pacific. 723 species of animals live in the park as well as a number of species of colorful fish, and it is open to scuba diving, bird-watching and hiking. In 2005, Huatulco was awarded the Green Globe (now called EarthCheck Sustainable Destinations) International Certification as a sustainable tourist area. Huatulco was the first sustainable tourist community in the Americas and the third worldwide, after Bali in Indonesia and Kaikōura in New Zealand, to receive this prestigious award because of its development programs for a culture environmentally friendly to conserve its natural resources. Bahía Órgano is named for the cacti that grow there. It is 240 meters long and only accessible by boat. Bahía Maguey is about 1/2 km long and is accessible by car. Both these bays have fine, white sand and waters of various colors of blue and green. Bahía Cacaluta and Bahía Chachacual are only accessible by boat, and there are absolutely no human constructions of any kind. Bahía San Agustín is the furthest west and the largest of all the bays. It has 1 km of beaches between 20 and 80 meters wide. There are also small islets inside the bay itself. Large portions of the Bahias de Huatulco resort area are located within an "ecological zone"; much of the area is protected from future development, and the area is serviced by modern water and sewage treatment plants so that no waste goes into its pristine bays.

== Gastronomy ==
In Huatulco there is a wide diversity of seafood along with traditional foods such as tlayuda, mole Oaxaqueño, cecina, and the exotic chapulines (edible insects). Local seafood is available for purchase and consumption on most of the nearby beaches, especially La Entrega and Maguey. In La Crucecita, the downtown area and the area near the main park has many local restaurants.

== Education ==
The Universidad del Mar has its campus in Huatulco.

== Bocana del Río Copalita ==
The Bocana del Río Copalita is a 2,500-year-old archaeological site located about ten kilometers from the bays, which is open to the public. The name means "place of copal" and covers an area of about thirty five hectares. It is believed to have been on the border between Zapotec and Mixtec dominions. Landmarks of the site include a main temple, a temple dedicated to a serpent god, a Mesoamerican ball court and a site museum.

== Climate ==
Sunshine can be expected about 330 days a year with the average temperature of 28 °C (82.4 °F). The dry season extends from December to May and the rainy season is from June to November. The amount of precipitation has a definite effect on the local vegetation, being brownish in the dry season and very green in the rainy season.

== Coffee plantations ==
There are a number of coffee plantations which are still in operation and give tours, including Finca (farm) Las Nieves, Finca Monte Carlos, Finca Margaritas, Finca El Pacífico and Finca La Gloria. Finca El Pacífico is known for the organic coffee it produces called "Pluma Hidalgo," and it is surrounded by waterfalls and ravines. Finca La Gloria is known for the butterfly sanctuary "Mariposorio Dain Biguid", where dozens of species of butterflies can be seen and the "Llano Grande Falls". The Río Copalitilla has its source here as well.

== Festival ==
The Festival Música por la Tierra (Music Festival for the Earth) features music and culture in an event designed to raise awareness about the environment. The event features a number of rock and popular music groups.

== Transportation ==
Although there have been improvements in infrastructure, Bahias de Huatulco is not as easy to get to as other resorts such as Cancun. The drive south from Acapulco on Federal Highway 200 has over 300 speed bumps. Driving from the state capital of Oaxaca city is not any easier because Federal Highway 175 is also full of speed bumps. Federal Highway 190 has fewer speed bumps, but it is a much longer road with many curves due to the mountainous terrain.

Bahias de Huatulco has an airport, the Bahías de Huatulco International Airport, which is served nationally by Aeromexico,Volaris, and Magnicharters from other Mexican airports. Several airlines also fly here from the U.S. and Canada.

Huatulco's new International Airport (HUX) has increased tourism not only in Huatulco, but in other nearby beaches like Mazunte and Zipolite. Every day flights arrive from Mexico City, bringing tourists to the local beaches. This airport and new road construction projects have made Oaxaca's Pacific Coast an increasingly popular destination for Mexican and international tourists.

== Gallery ==
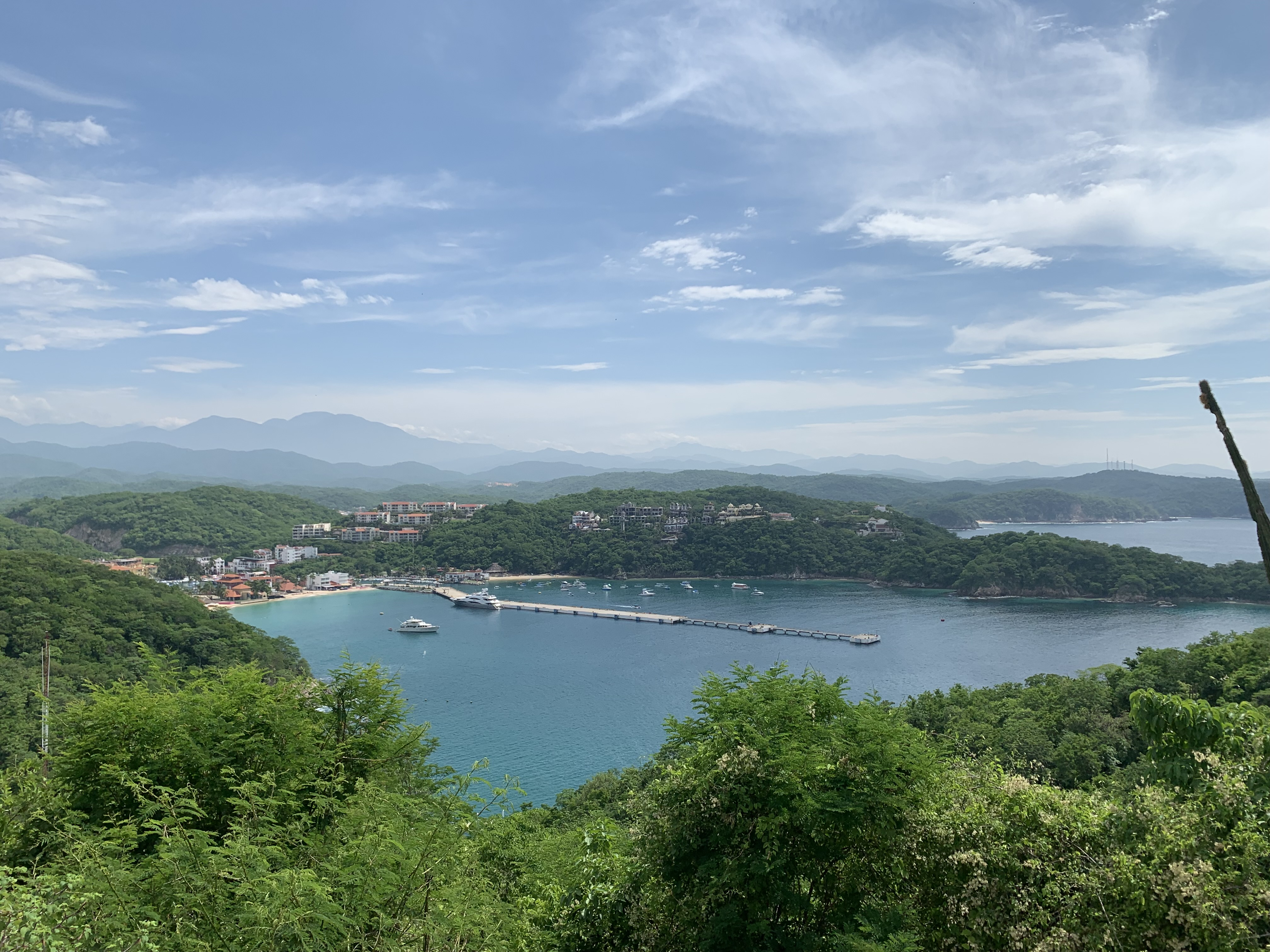
Santa Cruz Bay from a nearby hilltop

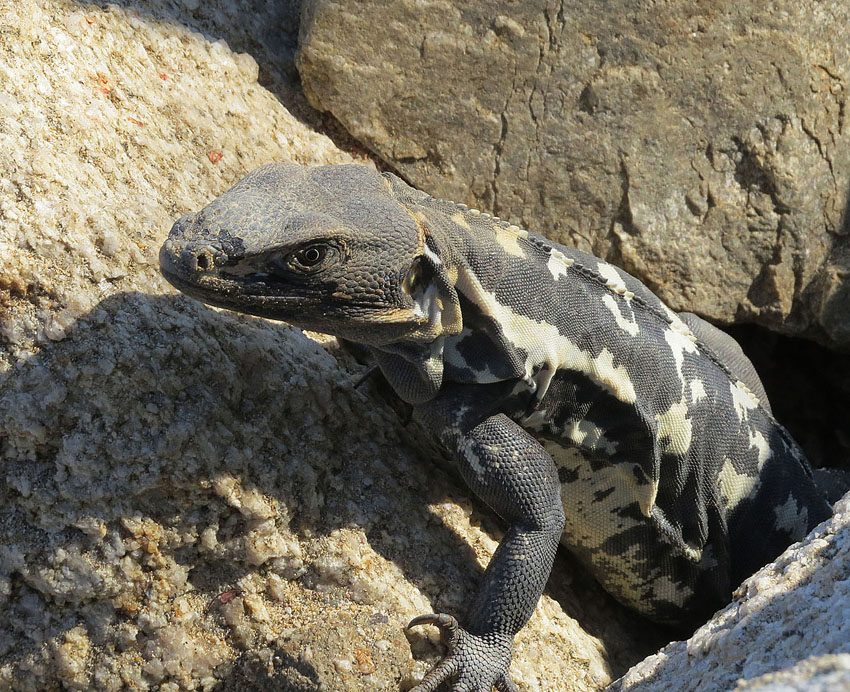
Western spiny-tailed iguana in Huatulco

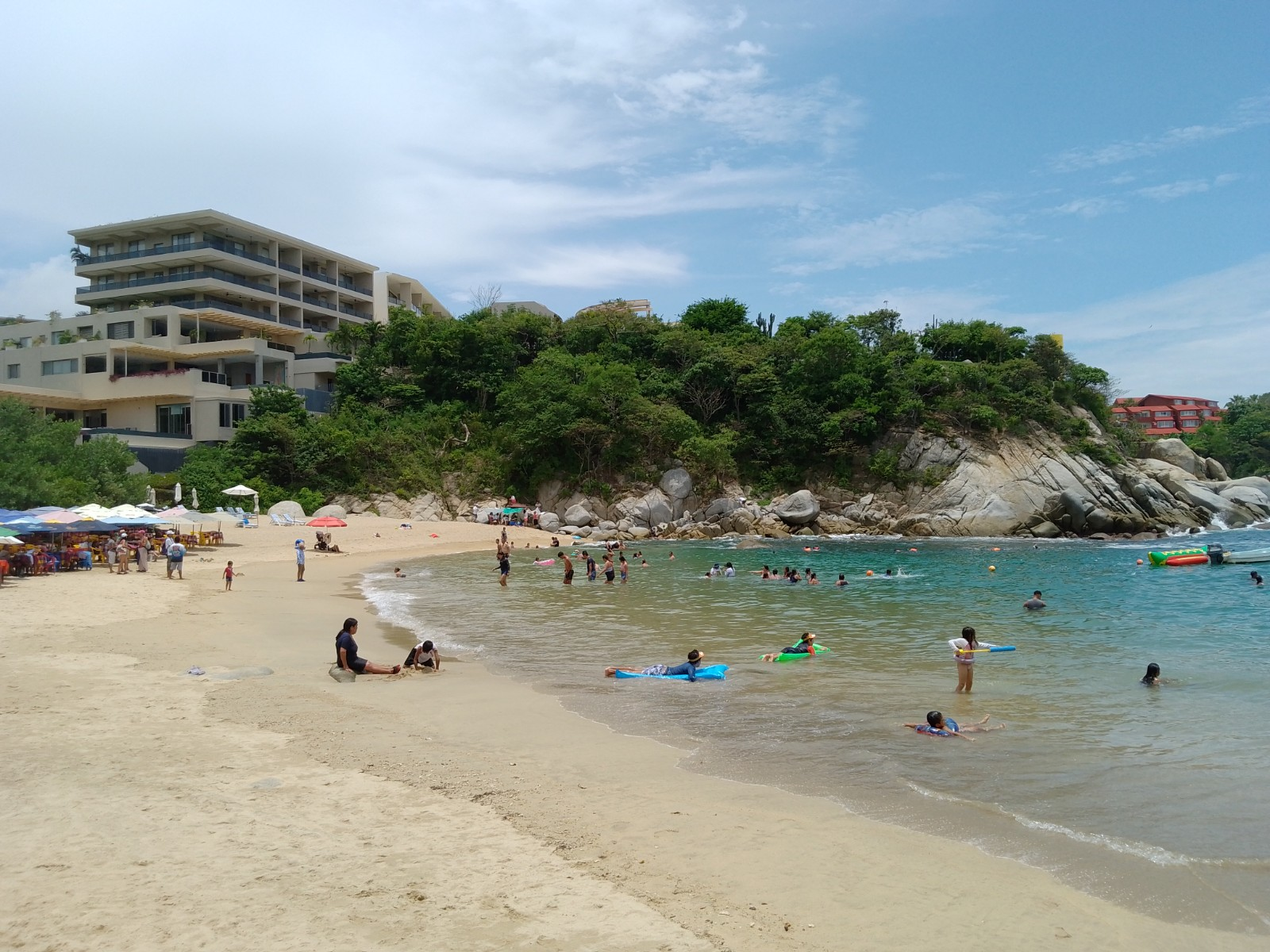
Tourists on Arrocito Beach

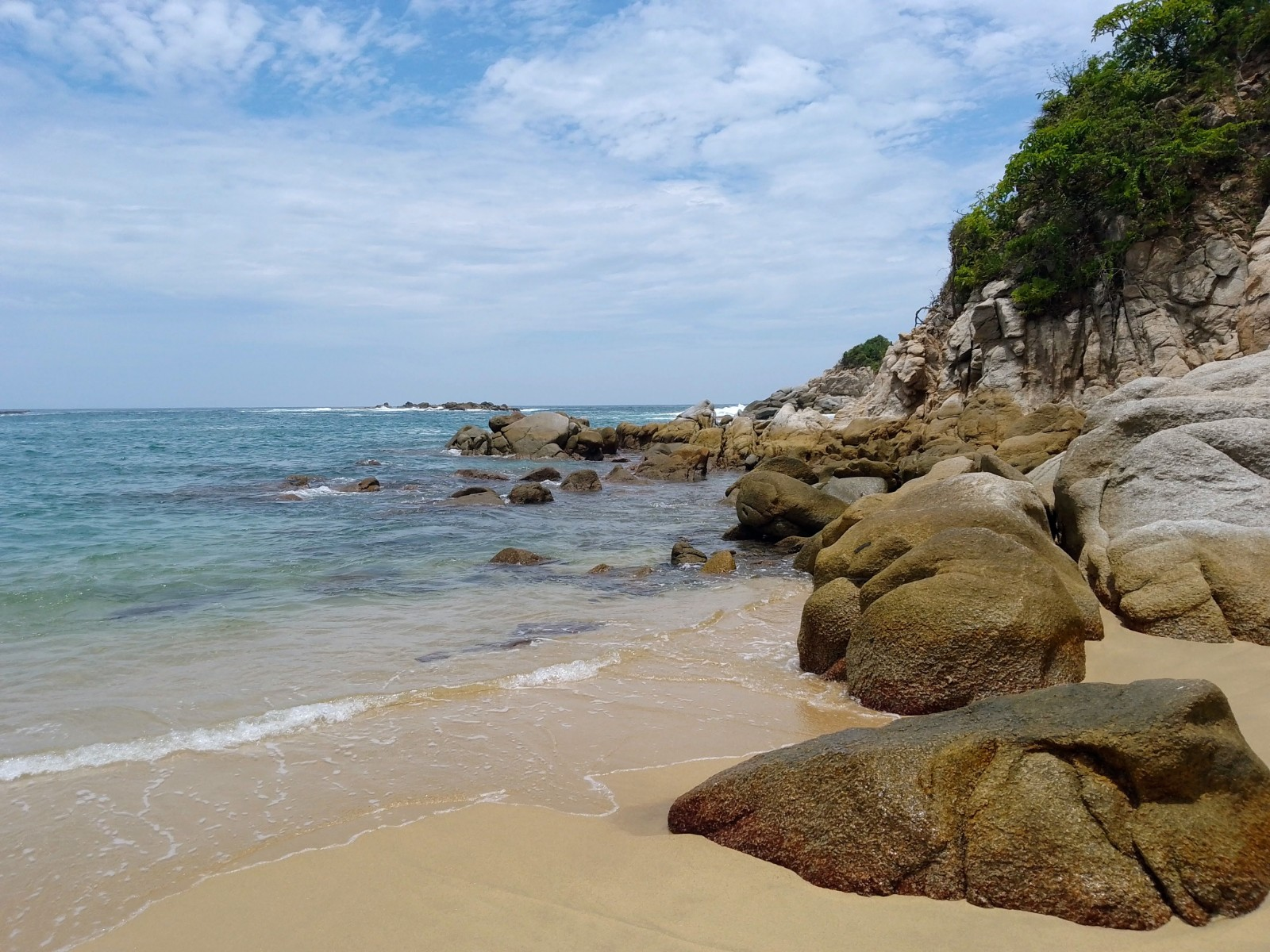
Rocks fringe the southern end of Arrocito Beach

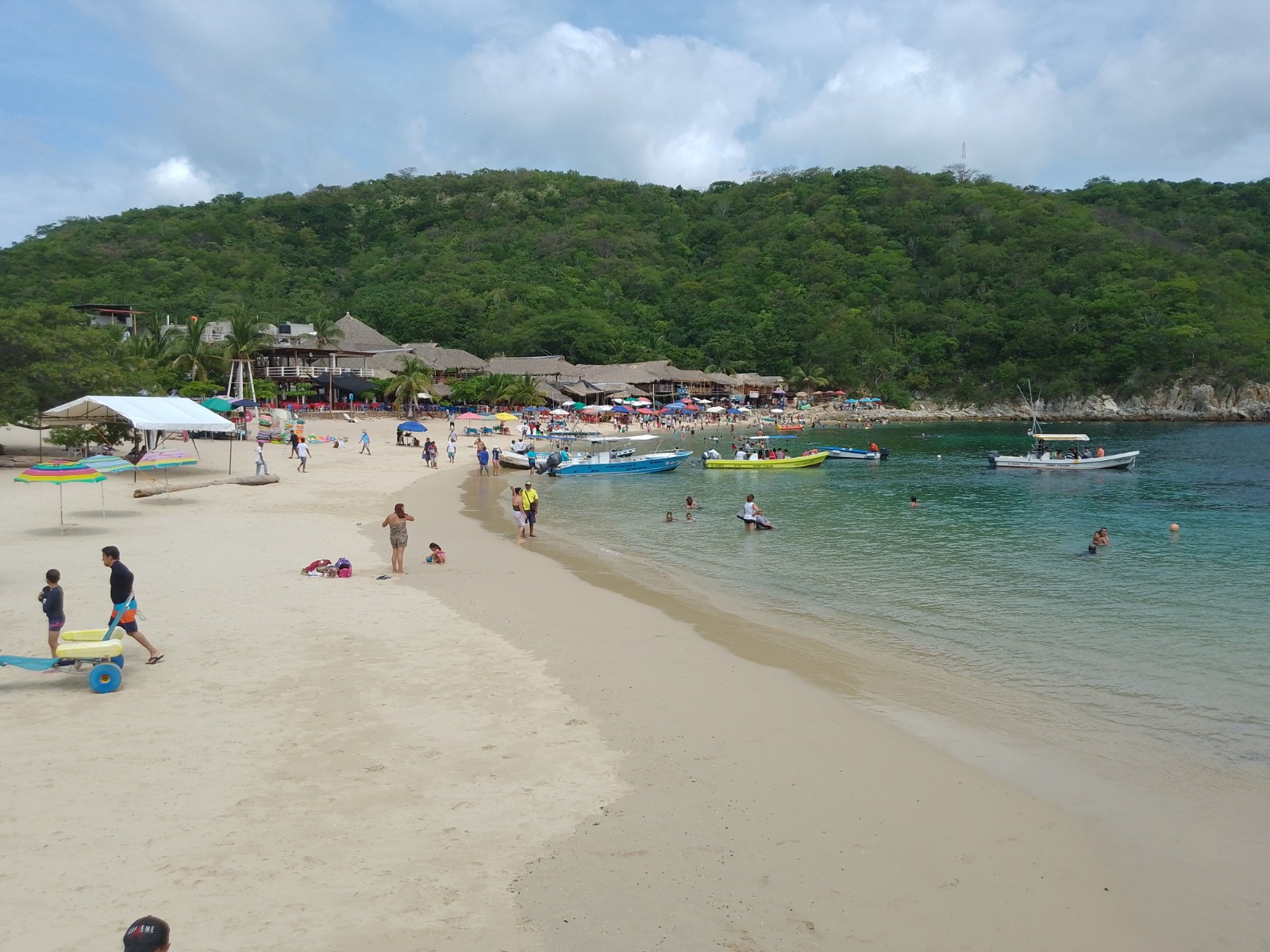
La Entrega Beach, popular with holidaymakers

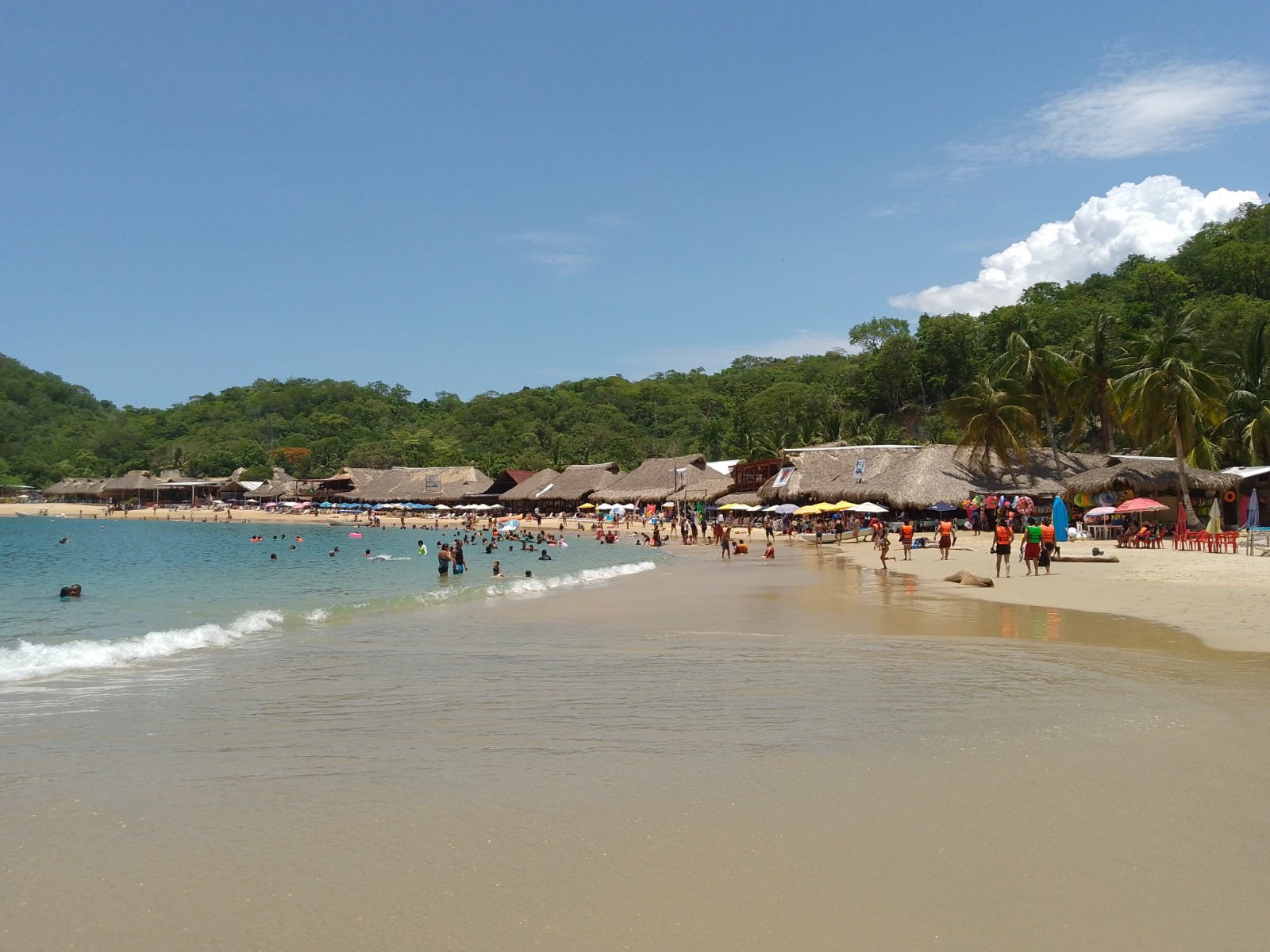
Maguey Beach, Maguey Bay
