= Pluma Hidalgo =

- Municipality and town
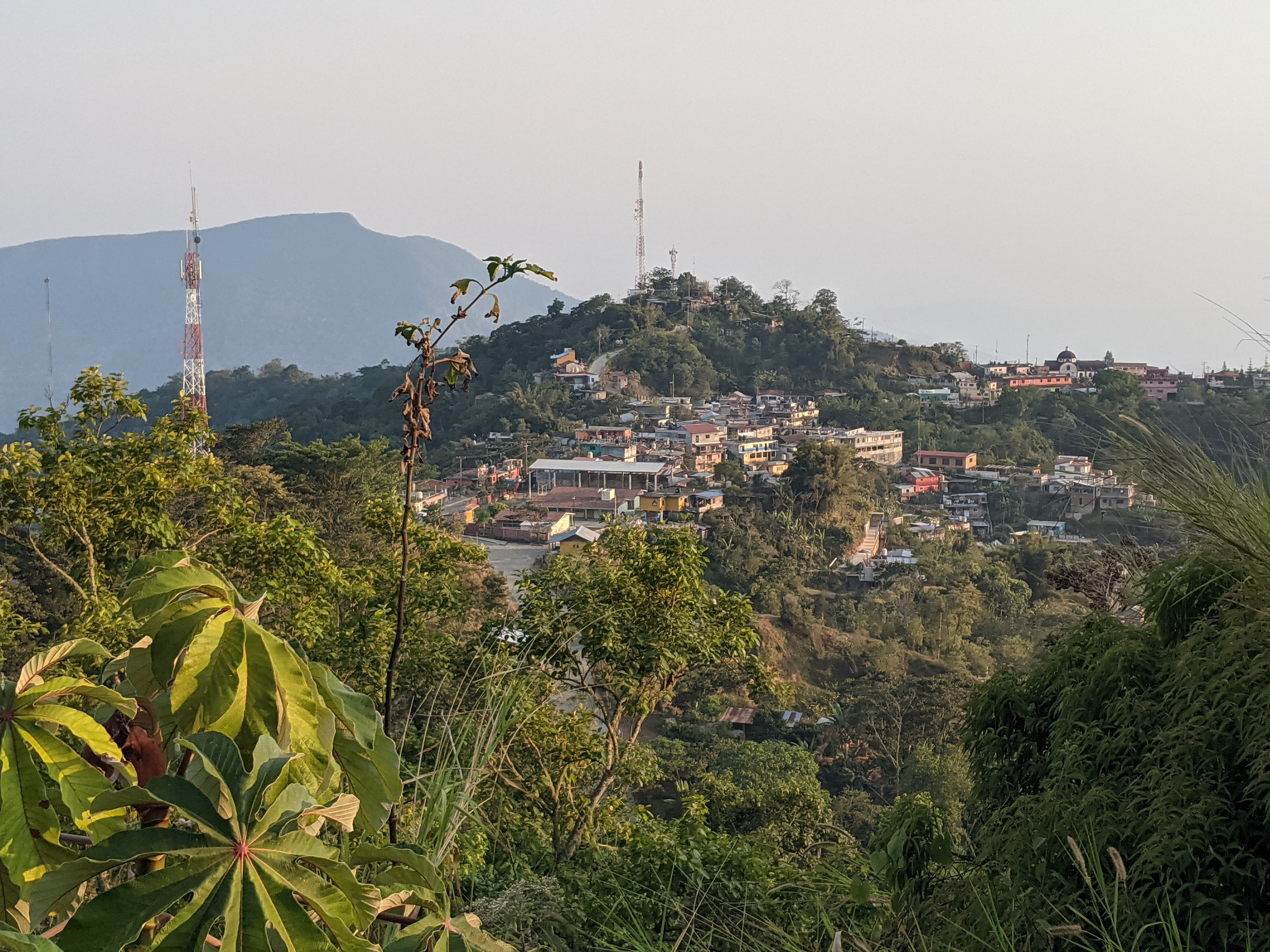

- Location in Mexico
- Coordinates: 15°55′N 96°25′W
- Country: Mexico
- State: Oaxaca

Area
  - Total: 179.9 km^{2} (69.5 sq mi)

Population (2005)
  - Total: 3,314
- Time zone: UTC-6 (Central Standard Time)

Pluma Hidalgo is a town and municipality in Oaxaca in south-western Mexico.

== Etymology ==
The name of "Pluma Hidalgo" was given because there is a small mountain located on the municipality and up the mountain there is a cloud that seemed like a feather, in Spanish "pluma". "Hidalgo" was added because this place was founded during the Mexican War of Independence, which was begun by Miguel Hidalgo y Costilla.

== Geography ==
The municipality covers an area of 179.9 km2. It is part of the Pochutla District in the east of the Costa Region. The Sierra Madre del Sur goes through this municipality which is characterized by Cerro de la Pluma, Cerro León and Cerro de las Nieves. In this region the weather is humid because of the mountains. The normal weather conditions are about 20°C, and in summer the rains are abundant.

== Demography ==
As of 2005, the municipality had a total population of 3,314. It is one of the most idoneous place in Mexico for the cultivation of coffee: Pluma gourmet coffee is one of the most prestigious types of the drink.
