= Candelaria Loxicha =

- Municipality and town
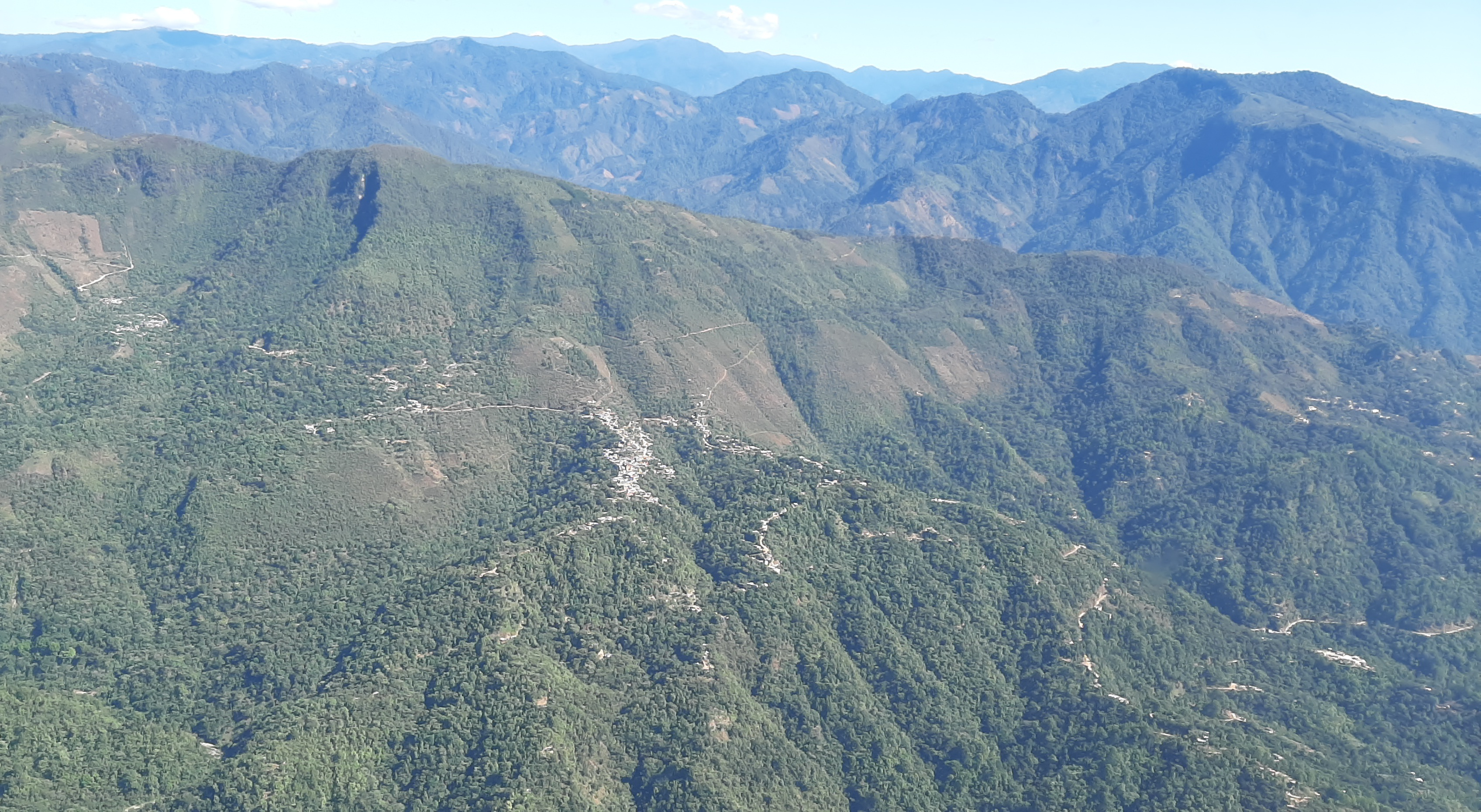

- Location in Mexico Candelaria Loxicha (Mexico)
- Coordinates: 15°55′N 96°29′W
- Country: Mexico
- State: Oaxaca

Area
  - Total: 86.8 km^{2} (33.5 sq mi)

Population (2020)
  - Total: 11,166
- Time zone: UTC-6 (Zona Centro)

Candelaria Loxicha is a town and municipality in Oaxaca in southern Mexico. The municipality covers an area of 86.8 km^{2}. It is part of the Pochutla District in the east of the Costa Region.

In the 2020 Census, the municipality reported a total population of 11,166, up from 8,686 in 2005.
