= Santa María Huatulco =

- Municipality and town

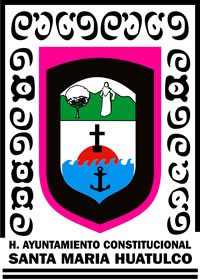
- Coat of arms

- Location in Mexico
- Coordinates: 15°50′N 96°19′W
- Country: Mexico
- State: Oaxaca

Area
  - Total: 579.22 km^{2} (223.64 sq mi)
- Elevation: 220 m (720 ft)

Population (2020)
  - Total: 50,862
- Time zone: UTC-6 (Central Standard Time)

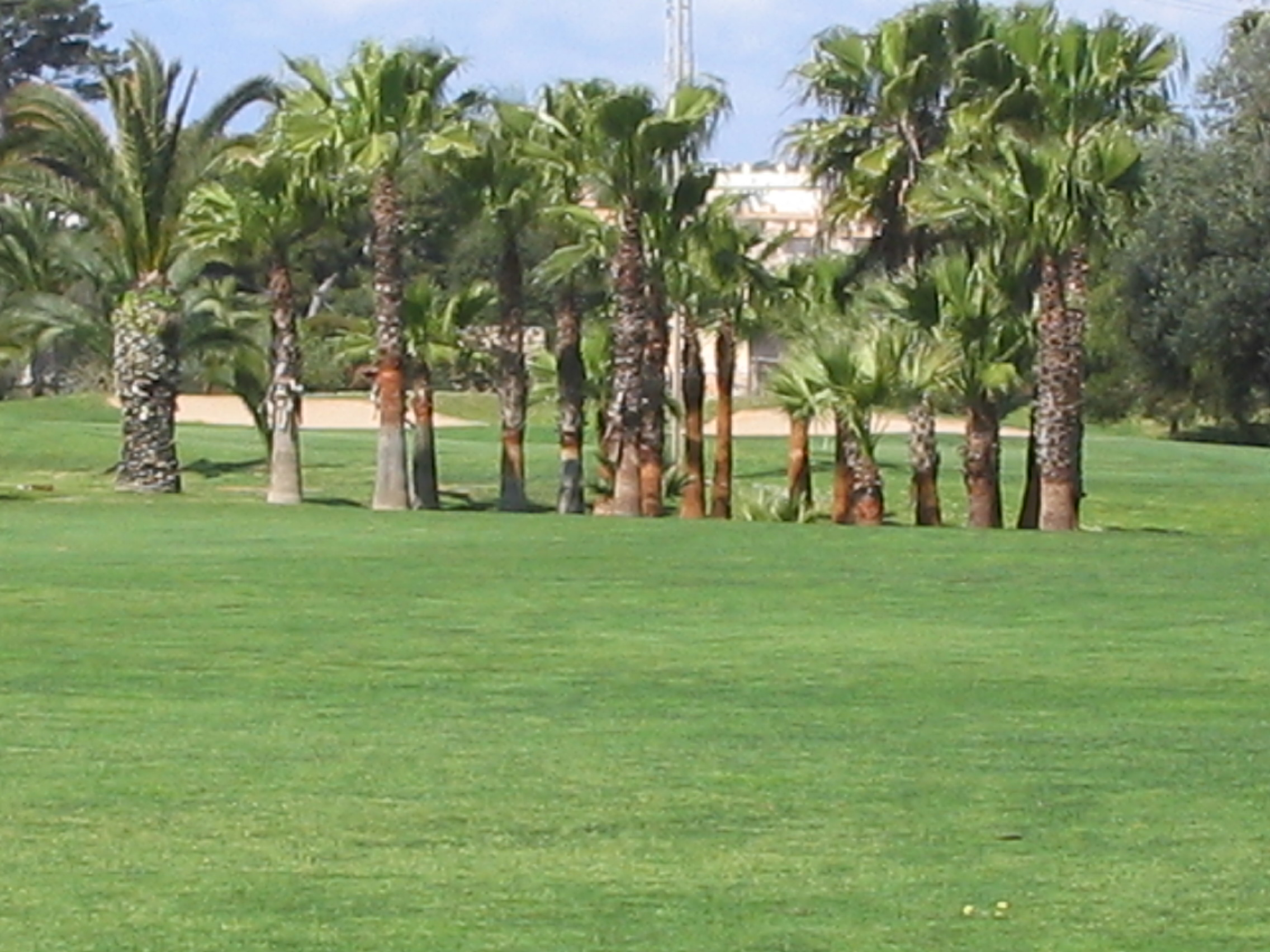
Palm trees in city park

Santa María Huatulco is a town and municipality in Oaxaca in south-western Mexico. It is part of the Pochutla District in the east of the Costa Region. The meaning of Huatulco, or Guatulco Coatulco is, "where they worship the tree", referring to an ancient legend.

== History ==
Hernán Cortés conquered the town of Huatulco on 8 January 1539.

== Demographics ==
As of 2005, the municipality had a total population of 33,194 of which 1,119 spoke an indigenous language. The population includes many migrants from other areas drawn by the tourist business. Economic activities by numbers employed included tourism (40%), cultivation of coffee (30%), fishery (20%) and animal husbandry (10%).

== Economy ==
Tourism development is concentrated in the communities of Santa Cruz, La Crucecita and Tangolunda, with nine bays (Santa Cruz, Chahue, Tangolunda, Conejos, Chacahual, Cacaluta, San Agustín, El Órgano and Maguey) and 36 beaches, as well as ecological reserves that contain diverse nesting birds and reptiles. The municipality is the home of Huatulco National Park.

The area is served by Bahías de Huatulco International Airport.

== Geography ==
The municipality covers an area of 579.22 km^{2} at an average of 220 meters above sea level. The Magdalena and Cruz rivers combine in the municipality to form the Huatulco river. Its ecosystem is lowland deciduous and includes mahogany, cedar, cashew and many other species of tree. Wildlife includes squirrel, opossum, skunk, raccoon, coati, ringtail, armadillos, ocelots and white-tailed deer.

=== Climate ===
Climate data for Huatulco, Oaxaca, Mexico
Month	Jan	Feb	Mar	Apr	May	Jun	Jul	Aug	Sep	Oct	Nov	Dec	Year
Mean daily maximum °C	31	31	32	33	33	31	31	32	31	31	32	31	32
Mean daily minimum °C	22	22	23	24	25	25	24	24	24	24	23	22	24
Mean daily maximum °F	88	88	90	91	91	88	88	90	88	88	90	88	89
Mean daily minimum °F	72	72	73	75	77	77	75	75	75	75	73	72	74

Huatulco has a borderline tropical wet and dry climate/semi-arid climate (Köppen Aw/BSh), featuring stable, hot temperatures all year round, with two marked seasons, a dry season from November through May, and a wet season from June through October. According to long-term climate data, Santa María Huatulco experiences warm temperatures throughout the year, with daily lows rarely dropping below 20 °C, even in winter. UV radiation levels are high all year round, ranging from 8 in December to 11+ between March and September. Heat and humidity are very high all year round.

Climate data for Santa María Huatulco, Oaxaca
Month	Jan	Feb	Mar	Apr	May	Jun	Jul	Aug	Sep	Oct	Nov	Dec	Year
Record high °C (°F)	39 (102)	38 (100)	39 (102)	38 (100)	40 (104)	37 (99)	39 (102)	39 (102)	36 (97)	40 (104)	36 (97)	37 (99)	40 (104)
Mean daily maximum °C (°F)	32 (90)	32 (90)	33 (91)	33 (91)	33 (91)	32 (90)	33 (91)	33 (91)	32 (90)	33 (91)	33 (91)	33 (91)	33 (91)
Daily mean °C (°F)	26 (79)	26 (79)	27 (81)	28.5 (83.3)	29 (84)	28.5 (83.3)	28 (82)	28.5 (83.3)	28 (82)	27.5 (81.5)	26.5 (79.7)	26 (79)	27.4 (81.3)
Mean daily minimum °C (°F)	23 (73)	23 (73)	24 (75)	25 (77)	26 (79)	26 (79)	26 (79)	26 (79)	25 (77)	25 (77)	24 (75)	23 (73)	24 (75)
Record low °C (°F)	17 (63)	15 (59)	18 (64)	19 (66)	17 (63)	21 (70)	19 (66)	16 (61)	21 (70)	19 (66)	17 (63)	17 (63)	15 (59)
Average precipitation mm (inches)	3 (0.1)	1 (0.0)	1 (0.0)	1 (0.0)	27 (1.1)	176 (6.9)	124 (4.9)	121 (4.8)	174 (6.9)	66 (2.6)	9 (0.4)	1 (0.0)	704 (27.7)
Average precipitation days (≥ 0.1 mm)	0	0	0	0	2	7	6	6	7	3	0	0	31
Mean monthly sunshine hours	248	252	279	210	217	180	186	186	150	217	240	248	2,613
Mean daily sunshine hours	8	9	9	7	7	6	6	6	5	7	8	8	7.1
Source: WeatherSpark

Huatulco mean sea temperature
Jan	Feb	Mar	Apr	May	Jun	Jul	Aug	Sep	Oct	Nov	Dec
26 °C (79 °F)	27 °C (81 °F)	27 °C (81 °F)	28 °C (82 °F)	29 °C (84 °F)	30 °C (86 °F)	30 °C (86 °F)	30 °C (86 °F)	29 °C (84 °F)	29 °C (84 °F)	28 °C (82 °F)	27 °C (81 °F)

The temperature of the sea is quite stable, with lows of 26 °C (79 °F) in January, and a high of 30 °C (86 °F) between June and August.
