= Mermejita =

Beach village in Oaxaca, Mexico

Coordinates: 15.662°N 96.560°W

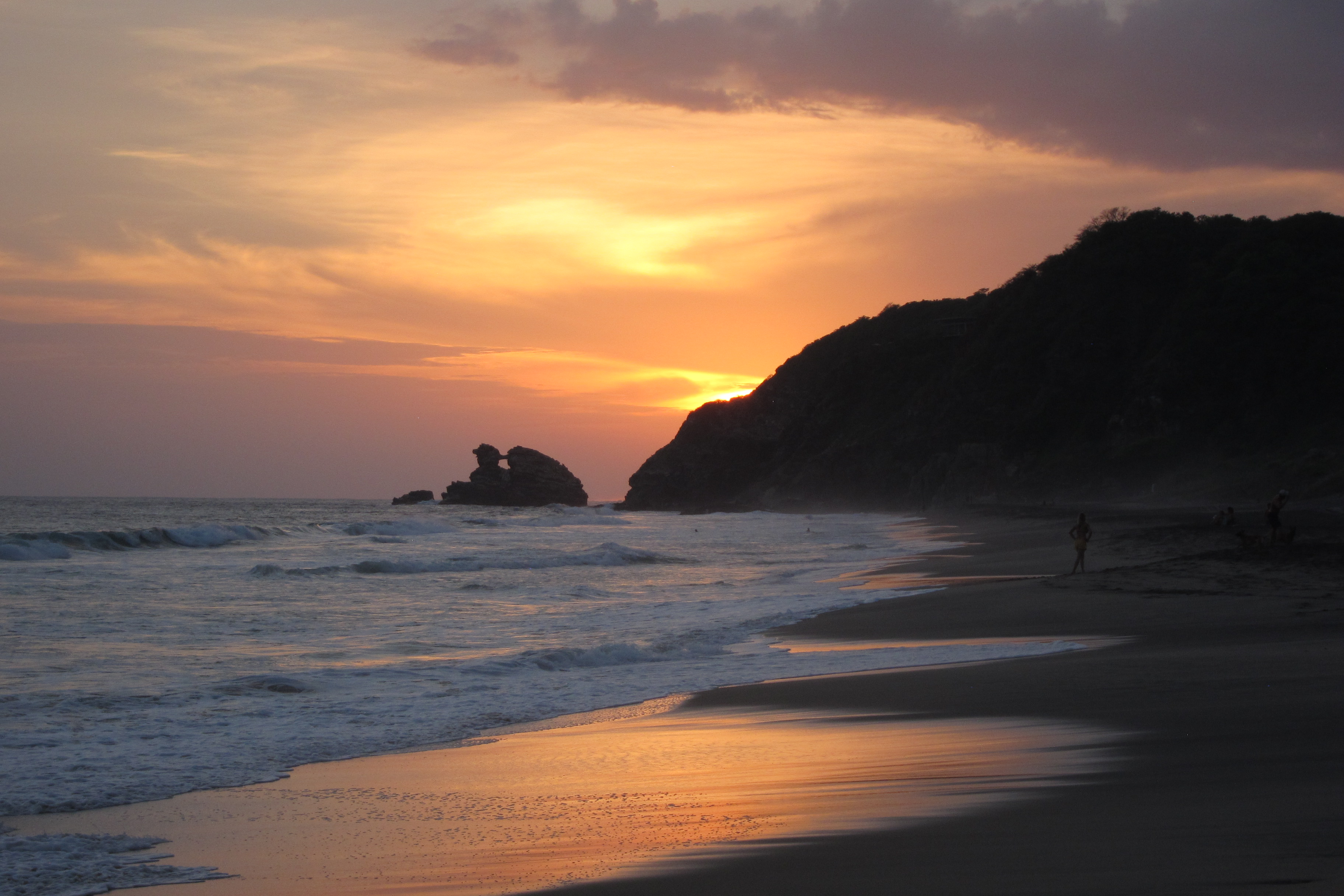
Mermejita beach at sunset

Mermejita is a small beach village in the central part of Oaxaca's coast, west of San Agustinillo and Mazunte and east of Chacahua. Until recently, the area was completely uninhabited, but now it is attracting adventurers who are building Robinson Crusoe-style houses, using local materials. It is known as a nudist beach, and one of only two places in Oaxaca where the rare leatherback turtle nests.

Playa Mermejita is bordered on its east end by Punta Cometa, the southernmost point in the Mexican state of Oaxaca, and on its west end by Punta Ventanilla, a distinguished looking rock formation with a "ventana" or window in it which can be observed from several miles distance. Aside from its isolation, this beach is popular for viewing sunsets over the ocean. At Torón Rock, a rocky promontory to the extreme east of the beach, one can watch dolphins, whales, and orcas that swim close by in the open ocean.
