= Playa Zipolite =

Zipolite
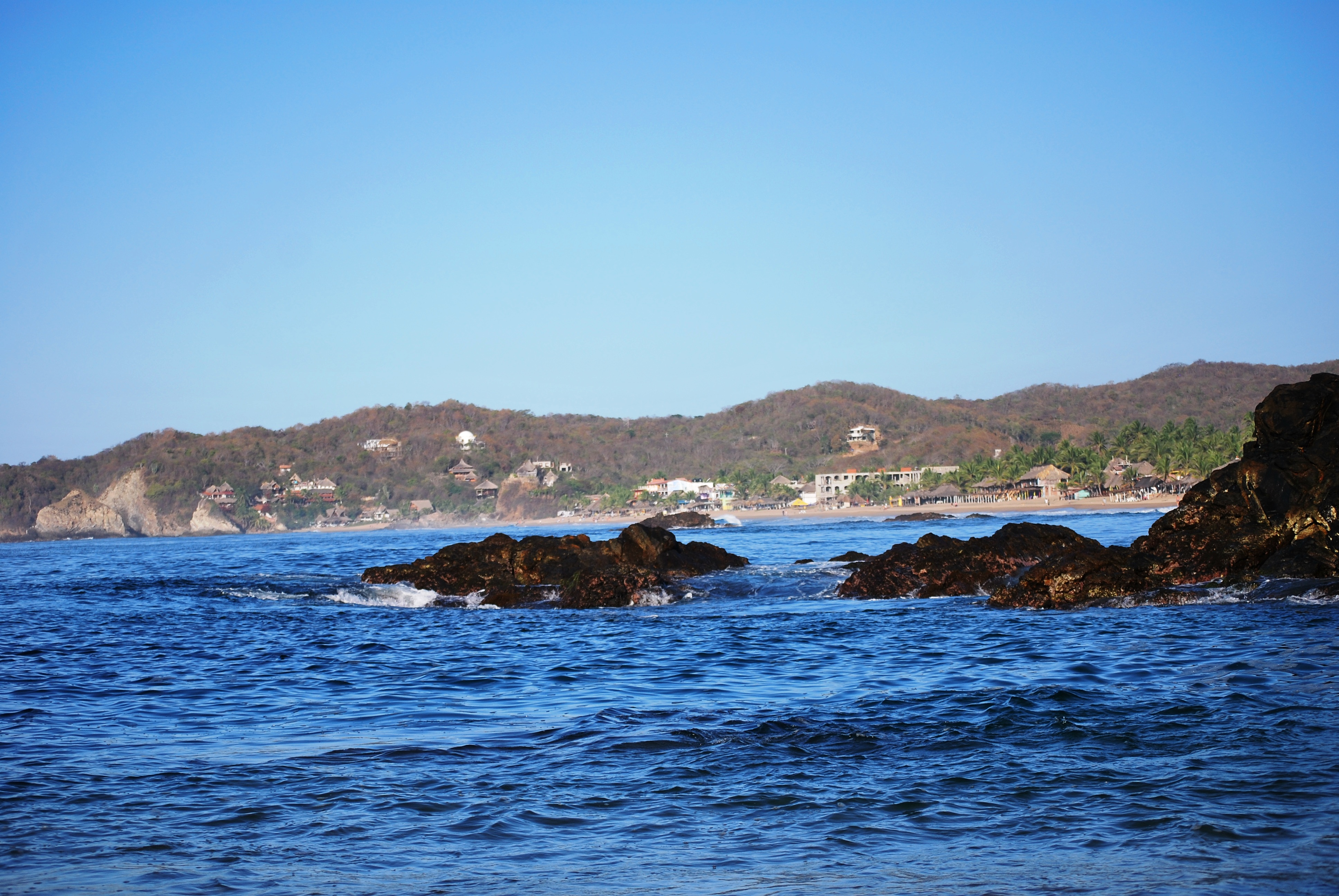

- Location in Mexico
- Coordinates: 15°39′46″N 96°30′34″W
- Country: Mexico
- State: Oaxaca
- Municipality: San Pedro Pochutla
- Elevation: 20 m (66 ft)

Population (2010)
  - Total: 1,059
- Time zone: UTC-6 (CST)
- Area code: 958

Playa Zipolite is a beach community located in San Pedro Pochutla municipality on the southern coast of Oaxaca state in Mexico between Huatulco and Puerto Escondido.

Zipolite is best known for being Mexico's first and only legal public nude beach and for retaining much of the hippie culture that made it notable in the 1970s. The beach is popular with foreign tourists, especially backpackers, who stay in one of the many rustic cabins or camping spaces that line the beach. The locals refer to this place as the "Beach of the Dead": although it is very popular and close to many attractive resorts, it is also the deadliest beach in Mexico, taking around 50 swimmers every year due to its heavy current.

== Name origin ==
The origin of the name Zipolite has been lost over time. Translated from Zapotec, it means "beach of the dead". Some versions have that referring to dangerous underwater currents just offshore. Locals say the Zapotecs offered the bodies of their dead to the sea, and it is the consequence for why the beach was unoccupied until alternative foreigners started arriving here in 1969. Other versions has it coming from the Nahuatl word sipolitlan or zipotli, meaning "bumpy place" or "place of continuous bumps or hills".

== History ==
Archeological finds at the east end of the beach shows that the area has a long history, but for the first half of the 20th century only one family lived here. Formerly a fishing village, in the 1960s and 1970s, counterculture hippies began to congregate here in part due to the beach's isolated nature. At the time, there was little law enforcement, and drug use became common. In the 1970s and 1980s the beach gained a reputation in Mexico and among foreign travelers as a free-love paradise.

Since records began, Zipolite has been hit by three hurricanes; two in the 1990s and one in May 2022. The town has also been devastated by fires in, early 2000s, and most recently in late May 2022 a by product of the hurricane at that time. The first hurricane was Hurricane Pauline on 7 October 1997, a category four storm which destroyed nearly everything in town with strong flooding, leaving it—along with Mazunte and Puerto Ángel—cut off from the mainland, but there were no deaths. Next was Hurricane Rick on 9 November 1997. While not as strong as Pauline, the storm damaged roads and other infrastructure that was only partially rebuilt after Pauline. In 2022, Hurricane Agatha, the most powerful May hurricane along Mexico's Pacific coast since 1949, formed from a surface trough south of the Gulf of Tehuantepec, intensifying rapidly into a Category 2 hurricane with winds of 110 mph. Making landfall west of Puerto Ángel, Oaxaca, it weakened quickly inland, causing landslides and flash floods in Oaxaca, resulting in at least 9 fatalities and 6 missing persons. Estimated losses reached $50 million, though the National Hurricane Center did not provide specific damage figures.

A damaging fire occurred on 21 February 2001, burning many of the wood and palm-thatched structures that were on the beach.

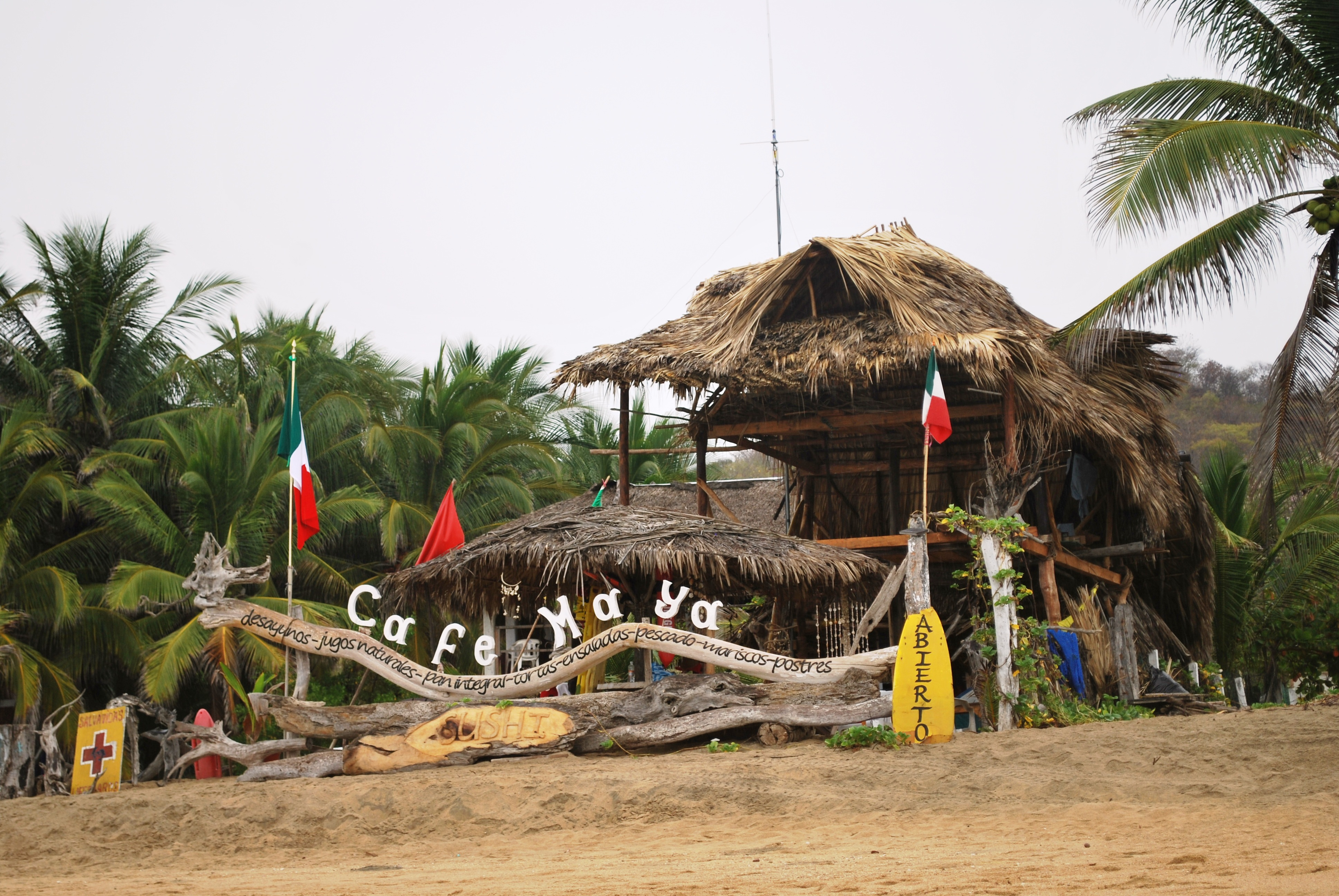
Cafe Maya housed in a palapa

Since its beginnings in the 1960s, Zipolite has evolved from handful of beachfront cabanas and palm-thatched palapas to concrete, but still basic, hotels and other structures with a few more amenities. Behind the line of beachfront construction is an area called Colonia Roca Blanca with a street known informally as the Adoquin which has become the town center. Recently, the municipality has added tourist information services and police patrols on the beach both day and night during the busy season.

== Community ==
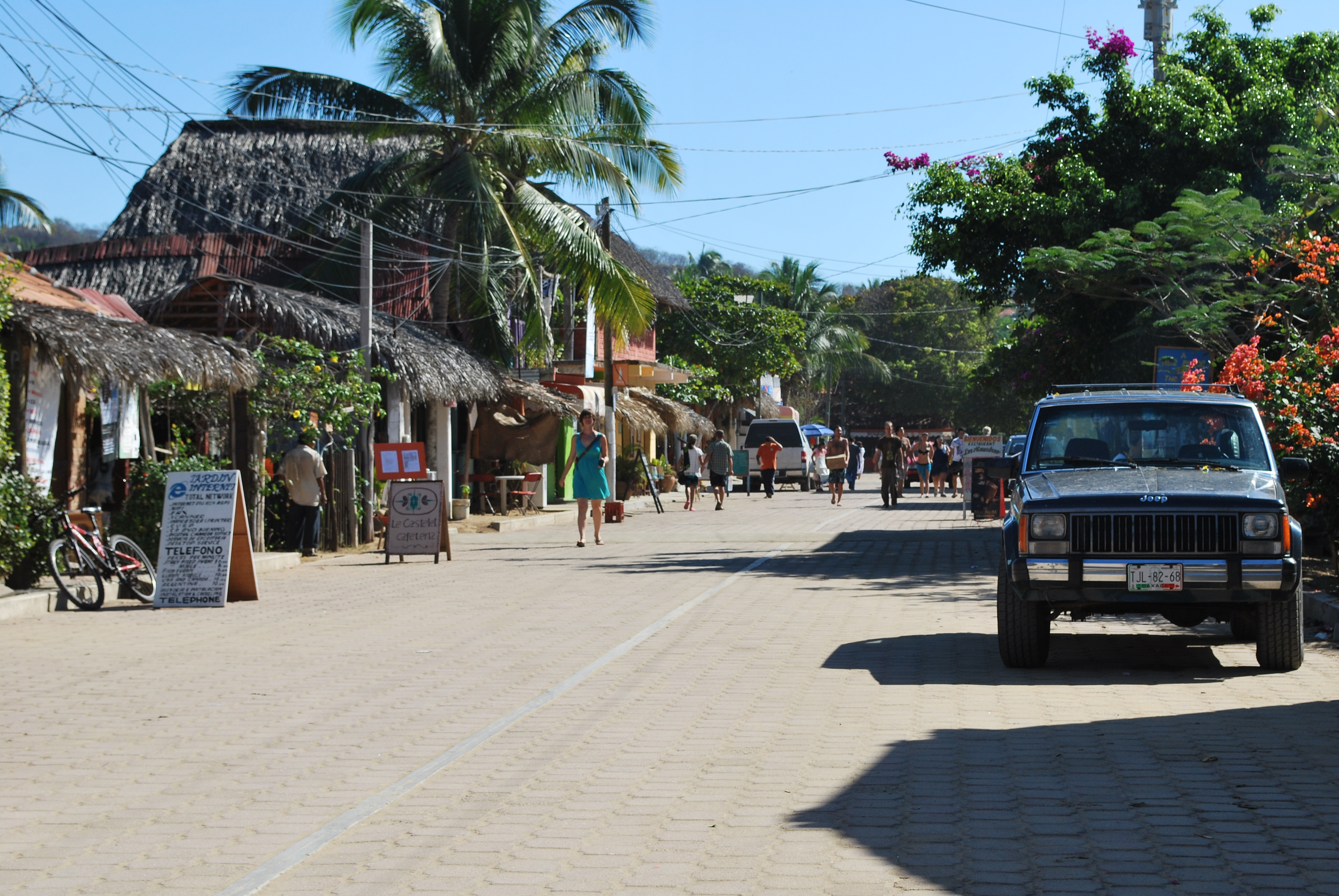
View of the Adoquín

The community known as Zipolite consists of an approximately one-mile stretch of beach with a street that parallels it. It has a central neighborhood, Colonia Roca Blanca, situated at the western end where many of the hotels and restaurants are located. Colonia Roca Blanca is named for the island or large rock just off the shore, which is white due to bird guano. Until 2014, the main street was the only paved street within the community. It is officially called the “Paisan” but locals call it the Adoquín. The town now has three streets paved with yellow brick and stonework. Further behind the beach and Adoquín is a larger road that connects Zipolite with other local communities such as San Agustinillo and Puerto Angel.

There are no building codes enforced here, so constructions vary as to materials and quality. There are no banking services here. An automated teller machine's (ATM) at Playa Zipolite Hotel (next to Casa Mexoni), in the Pharmacy below Move Gym, and also in the restaurant Sabor A Mar. Several bank branches are in Pochutla. There is no currency exchange either, but many places take U.S. dollars. Many places now accept credit cards, though many establishments are cash only. Almost all the establishments that face the beach have palapa sheltered restaurants and bars in front and lodging in the back. These lodgings can vary from wood huts, to simple concrete structures and often include hammocks and places to pitch tents. Most baths are shared. There is no high-rise development here and almost none of the lodgings offer air conditioning or hot water.

Zipolite also has a variety of restaurants from the standard Mexican to international cuisine and vegetarian choices. Many of the local restaurants are owned by expatriate Italians and serve pasta dishes as well as pizza. One restaurant serves crepes because of its French expatriate owner. Nightlife in Zipolite is subdued, however, in the high season (Nov. through May), some surprisingly good musicians pass through town.

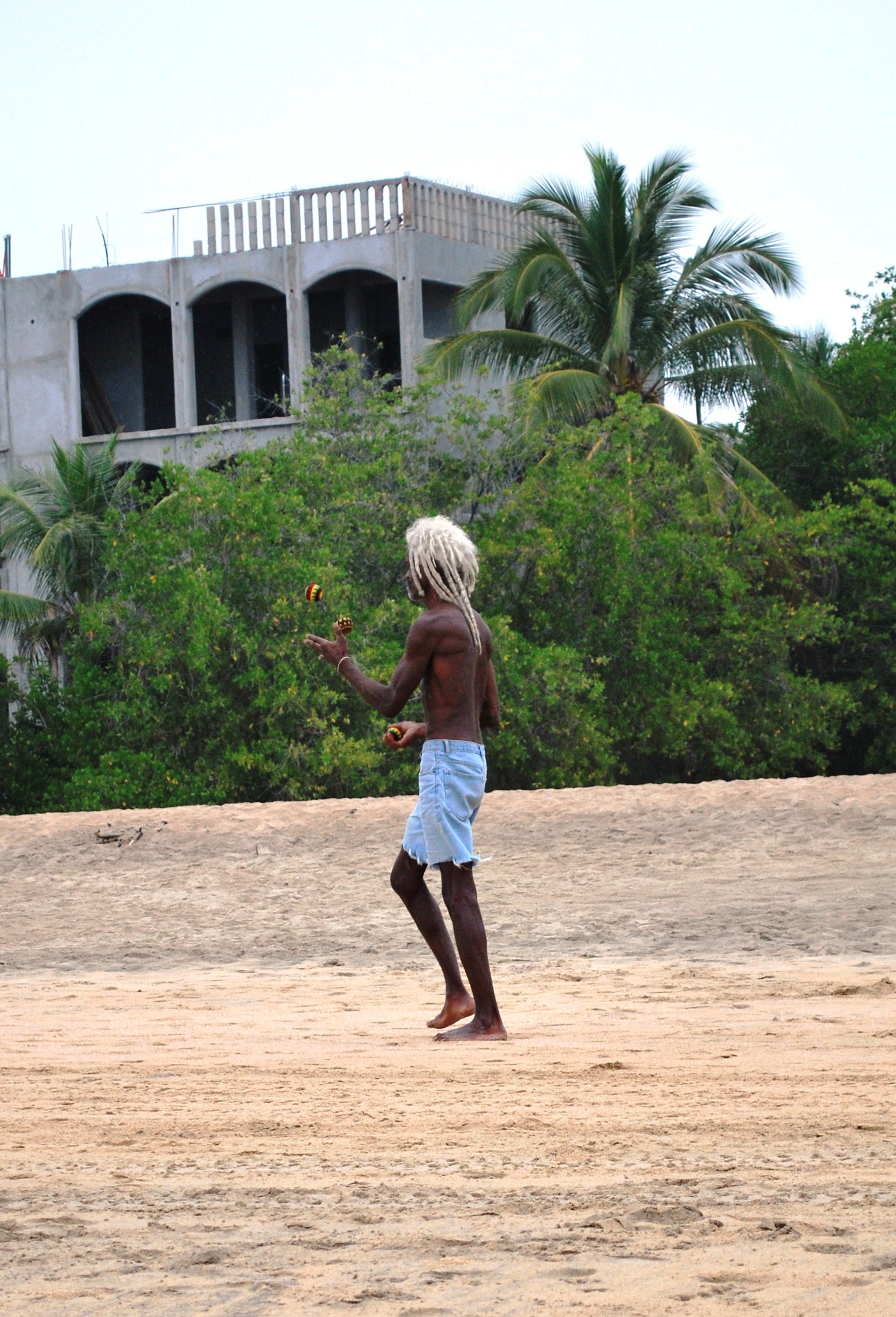
Man juggling on the beach

Zipolite still attracts those drawn to the hippie lifestyle. Attitudes about drug use, in particular marijuana, are also typically relaxed. The police station is largely unmanned, but extra efforts for security are implemented during busy seasons such as Christmas and Easter week, and during Festival Nudista in February, supplementing the normal local auxiliary police with regular patrolmen from San Pedro Pochutla. Other efforts include checking for intoxicated drivers and boaters in Zipolite and other area beaches.

Zipolite can be reached by flying into Huatulco or Puerto Escondido and traveling on coastal highway 200. It can also be reached by road from Oaxaca City via the new highway (Autopista Oaxaca Puerto Escondido) and then on coastal highway 200, which makes the total travel time from the state capitol about 3 hours. From the highway Zipolite can be accessed from the intersections to either Mazunte or Puerto Angel by either taxis colectivos (shared taxis) or a standard taxi.

== Piña Palmera ==
Piña Palmera is a rehabilitation and educational center for disabled children and adults, from rural communities in Oaxaca state, the majority of whom are indigenous people. It is a private charity which has existed since the 1980s, and the charity has enrolled over five thousand people in one or more of its programs. Most of its staff is volunteer. The endeavor is supported by a Swedish charity and it not affiliated with any political or religious group. As of 2009, about 350 people are in their programs.

== The Beach ==
Zipolite is a nearly pristine beach about forty meters wide and two km long, with medium grain gold colored sand. The water is clear with tones of blue and green. This was one of the beaches featured in the Mexican hit movie Y tu mamá también. It stretches from a small isolate cove called Playa del Amor on the east side to the new age Shambala retreat on the west end which is partially sheltered by rocks. Behind this is, sea cliffs rise. The beach is lined by palm trees and rustic cabins, hotel rooms and hammocks with a few more sophisticated lodgings on the west end. This beach is part of the Riviera Oaxaqueño, which includes the nearby beaches of Puerto Angel and San Agustinillo. This beach is favored by foreign tourists, most of whom are backpackers and by the Mexican middle class, especially during Holy Week vacation in Mexico. and first weekend of February during the annual naturist festival, Festival Nudista Zipolite organized by Federación Nudista de México and the local hoteliers' association. The beach's appeal stems from being one of very few beaches in which nudity is tolerated. Before it was mostly practiced on the sheltered far east Playa del Amor and the far west end, but recently the amount of nudists, also families with children, is growing also on the 'main' beach, probably thanks to some hotel owners becoming more open and flexible. In 2016, the Pochutla municipality declared Playa Zipolite nudity legal.

Swimming is practiced here but caution is strongly advised. Waves are strong in the afternoon, which is good for surfing and undertow is always strong. The ocean just offshore has strong currents that flow in circular patterns, some of which push swimmers toward shore and some which can pull swimmers out to sea. These currents are strong but not very wide. Swimmers have regularly drowned, prompting the creation of a volunteer lifeguard team and a flag system to indicate where and when it is safest to swim. The lifeguard team was founded in 1995 and trained by local charity Piña Palmera and U.S. citizen Joaquin Venado. In 1996, drownings at this beach were cut in half. The lifeguard service as of 2009 has ten lifeguards, an ATV, a jet ski, radios and other equipment provided by the state government. From 2007 to 2009, there have been no drowning deaths at Zipolite, a record, but there have been 180 registered rescues.

== Naturism and nudism ==
Nudity is legal on the beaches of Playa Zipolite, including Playa del Amor to the east of the main beach. Elsewhere, Mexican law condemns only "immorality" and thus the issue ends up being a matter of the judge's criteria.

As of 2016, Playa Zipolite is Mexico's first and only legal nude beach. A "free beach" and unofficially nudist for more than 40 years, it is reputed to be the best place for nudism in the country. The numerous nudists, and the long tradition, make it safe for nudism and naturism. Annually since 2016, on the first weekend of February, Zipolite has hosted Festival Nudista Zipolite organized by the Federación Nudista de México.

While most hotels and businesses in Zipolite require visitors to be clothed on the premises, there are establishments providing accommodations to those who wish to practice nudism off the beach as well as on it:

- Hotel Nude is Zipolite's first clothing-optional resort. It is situated directly on the beach.
- CAMP is a clothing-optional hostel and resort including a pool and sauna. It provides dormitory beds as well as private rooms. It is located half a kilometer from the beach.

Despite the COVID-19 pandemic in Mexico, the nudist festival was held on schedule from January 29 to February 1, 2021, with face masks recommended.

== See also ==
- La Ventanilla, Oaxaca
- Mazunte
- Puerto Angel
- San Agustinillo
- Clothes free organizations
- List of places where social nudity is practised
- List of social nudity places in North America
- Naturism
- Nudism
- Nude beaches
- Nude swimming
- Public nudity
- Timeline of non-sexual social nudity
- Topfreedom
