= Cometa =

Cometa may refer to:

- Cometa (HVDC), an undersea electric power transmission system between mainland Spain and the island of Majorca
- Punta Cometa Peninsula, on the Pacific Coast of Mexico
- Rey Cometa (born 1983), Mexican luchador
- Cometa, or Acronicta, a genus of noctuid moths
- COMETA report, a report about UFOs by the Comité d'Études Approfondies

== See also ==
- Comet (disambiguation)
