= Mazunte =

- Town
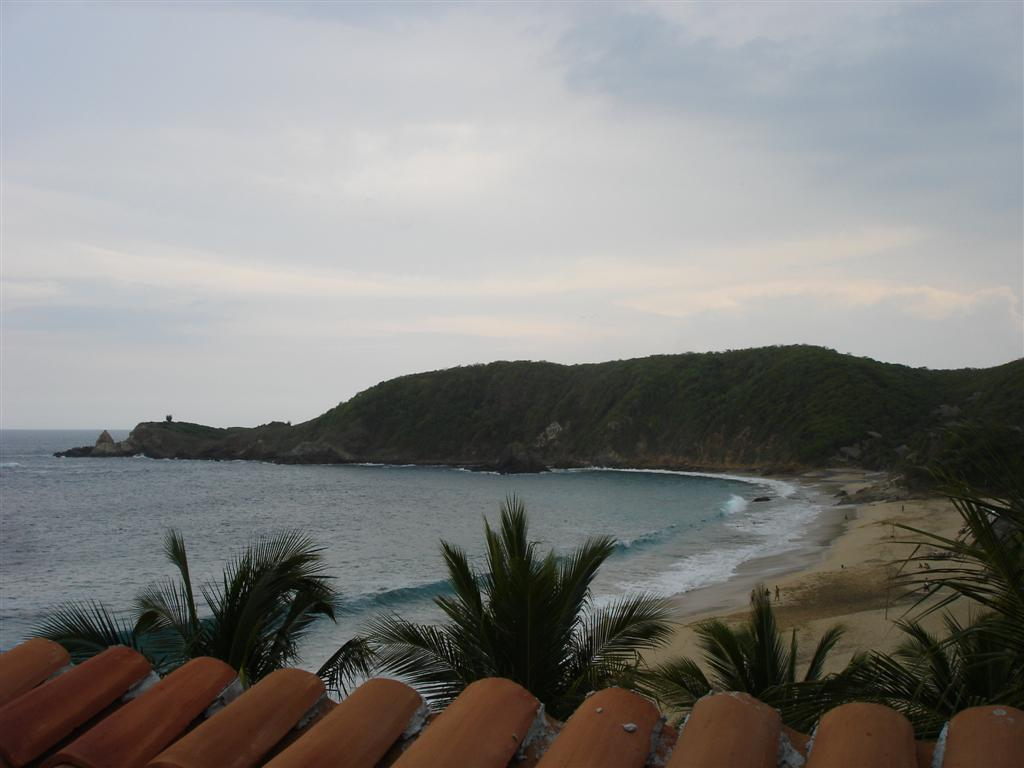
- Mazunte and Punta Cometa

- Location in Mexico
- Coordinates: 15°40′03″N 96°33′13″W
- Country: Mexico
- State: Oaxaca
- Municipality: Santa María Tonameca
- Elevation: 30 m (98 ft)

Population (2020)
  - Total: 651
- Time zone: UTC-6 (CST)
- Postal code: 70902
- Area code: 958

Mazunte is a small beach town on the Pacific coast of Oaxaca, Mexico (15.66485°N 96.55388°W). It is located 22 km southwest of San Pedro Pochutla on coastal Highway 200. Mazunte is located some 10 km to the west of Puerto Ángel and just about 1 km from San Agustinillo and 264 km south of the capital of Oaxaca. There are two etymologies for the name. Some sources state that "Mazunte" is derived from a Nahuatl phrase, "maxotetia" which means "please deposit eggs here." However, older residents of the community state that it is from the word “mizontle,” used by locals to refer to a crab species that used to be very abundant in the area.

Mazunte is famous for sea turtles. Before the mid 20th century, it had nearly no human population, but that changed when a market for sea turtle meat and eggs developed. Due to the many turtles that come to Mazunte to lay eggs, by the 1970s, Mazunte was the center of sea turtle hunting in Mexico, with its own slaughterhouse. Concern over the declining number of sea turtles eventually led to an absolute ban on turtle meat and eggs in Mexico, and deprived most families in Mazunte of their main source of income. To replace it, ecotourism based on the conservation of turtles and natural cosmetics developed. The main attractions of Mazunte today are the Mexican National Turtle Center and the Cosméticos Naturales de Mazunte.

In 2012, Mazunte was heavily damaged by Hurricane Carlotta.

== History ==
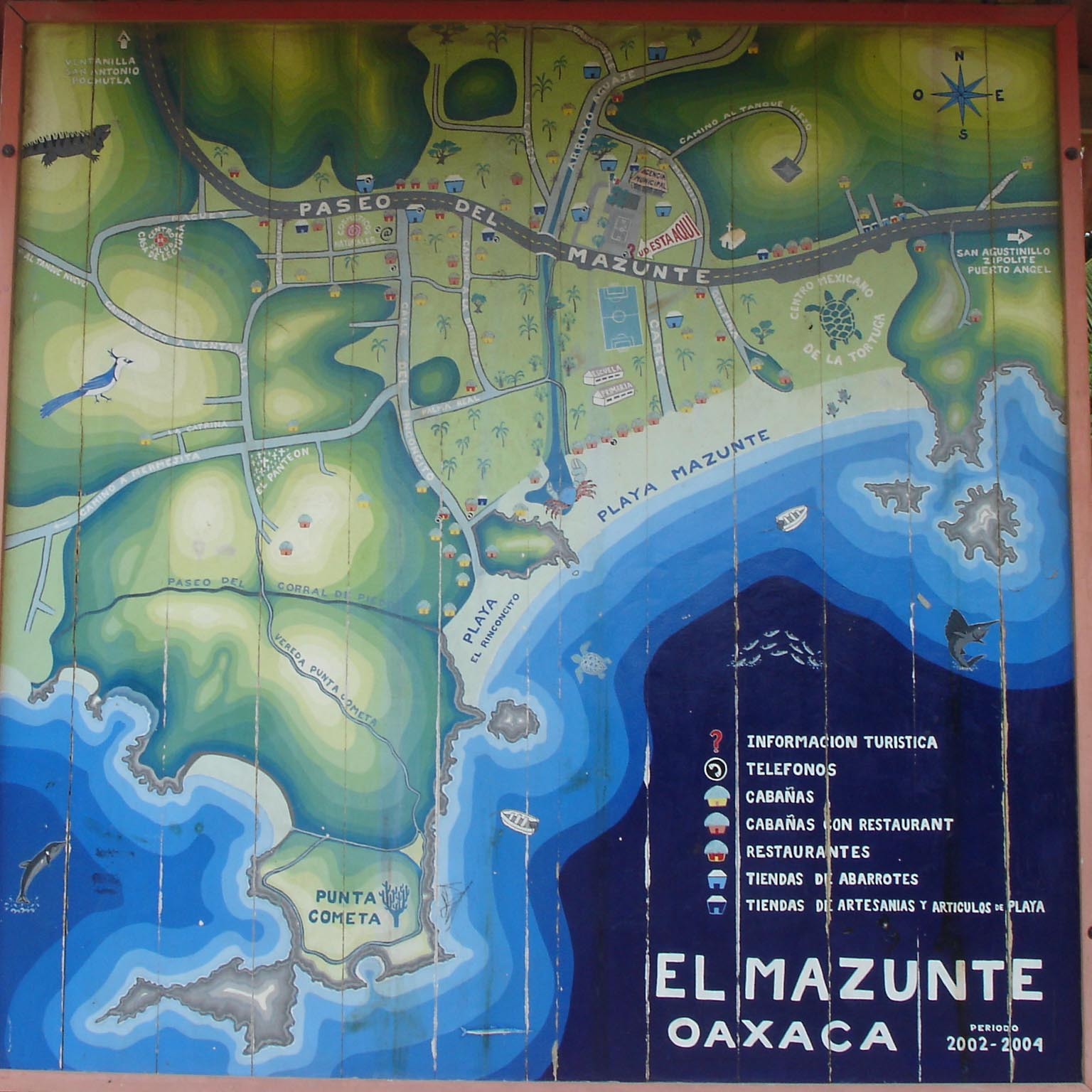
A Map of Mazunte

Up until the middle of the 20th century, very few people lived in this area as it was isolated and inaccessible. Only about two or three homes belonging to families who made a living by subsistence fishing and agriculture were here. The population began to rise with the establishment of sea turtle hunting, which began in nearby San Agustinillo. In the 1970s a turtle slaughterhouse was built in Mazunte, making the area the center of sea turtle exploitation, and the town became almost wholly dependent on the trade of turtle meat and eggs, the latter considered to be an aphrodisiac. Legally about 30,000 animals a year were butchered, but some environmentalists believe the illegal take may have been more than twice that.

The idea of ecotourism based on sea turtles began in the 1970s when a company called the Pesquera Industrial Oaxaca, became concerned with the over exploitation of sea turtles and proposed an industry based on the raising and release of turtles as well as the monitoring of the commercial capture. They founded a center which was taken over in 1985 by the Instituto Nacional de la Pesca, naming it after Daniel León de Guevara. In 1971, Mexico banned egg collection, but this prohibition was mostly ignored.

By 1988, the number of nests here dropped to 100,000 from an earlier average of 900,000. After the moratorium on sea turtles, nest number quickly rose again.

The trade in turtle meat and eggs was banned by the Mexican federal government in 1990 causing most families to lose the primary source of income. Government and private organizations stepped in to provide alternatives. The federal government established the Mexican National Turtle Center (Centro Mexicano de la Tortuga) as the center of an effort to promote sea turtles as a base for tourism. The community was also assisted by an environmental group known as Ecosolar in Mexico City and developed plans to educate about the environment, reforestation, and ecotourism. By the end of 1993, these groups along with Accion Forestal Tropical planted about 6,000 trees, and bungalows for guests made from traditional materials, such as palm fronds and adobe, were built. These bungalows originally were built adjacent to family homes, with guests sharing in family meals, and accompanying fishermen out to sea.

In 1993, Anita Roddick, founder of The Body Shop, was invited to visit Mazunte. Impressed with efforts here, an agreement was reached to distribute cosmetics made here with local ingredients. This effort also resulted in the creation of Cosméticos Naturales de Mazunte, a cooperative of fifteen families that produce and sell their own line of cosmetics in 1996. The community has declared itself a "Reserva Económica Ecológica Campesina" (Peasant Ecological Economic Reserve) as it has stopped hunting turtles and their eggs and work towards preserving them. The number of turtle nests increased from 60,000 in 1988 to nearly 700,000 in 1995 and the number continues to rise.

In 1997, Mazunte was devastated by Hurricanes Pauline and Rick, which caused widespread destruction and economic collapse. Almost everything built here was destroyed. To rebuild tourism, annual events such as the Spring Equinox Festival, The International Dance Festival and the Jazz Encounter were founded, which are the largest of their kind in Oaxaca.

Since the ban and the change in economy, household income has improved by an average of 17%. Before many residences had no running water, electricity, schools or health centers, which exist now. Now there is universal running water, three schools and a wider variety in diet. Land prices have risen as well as rents.

== The community ==
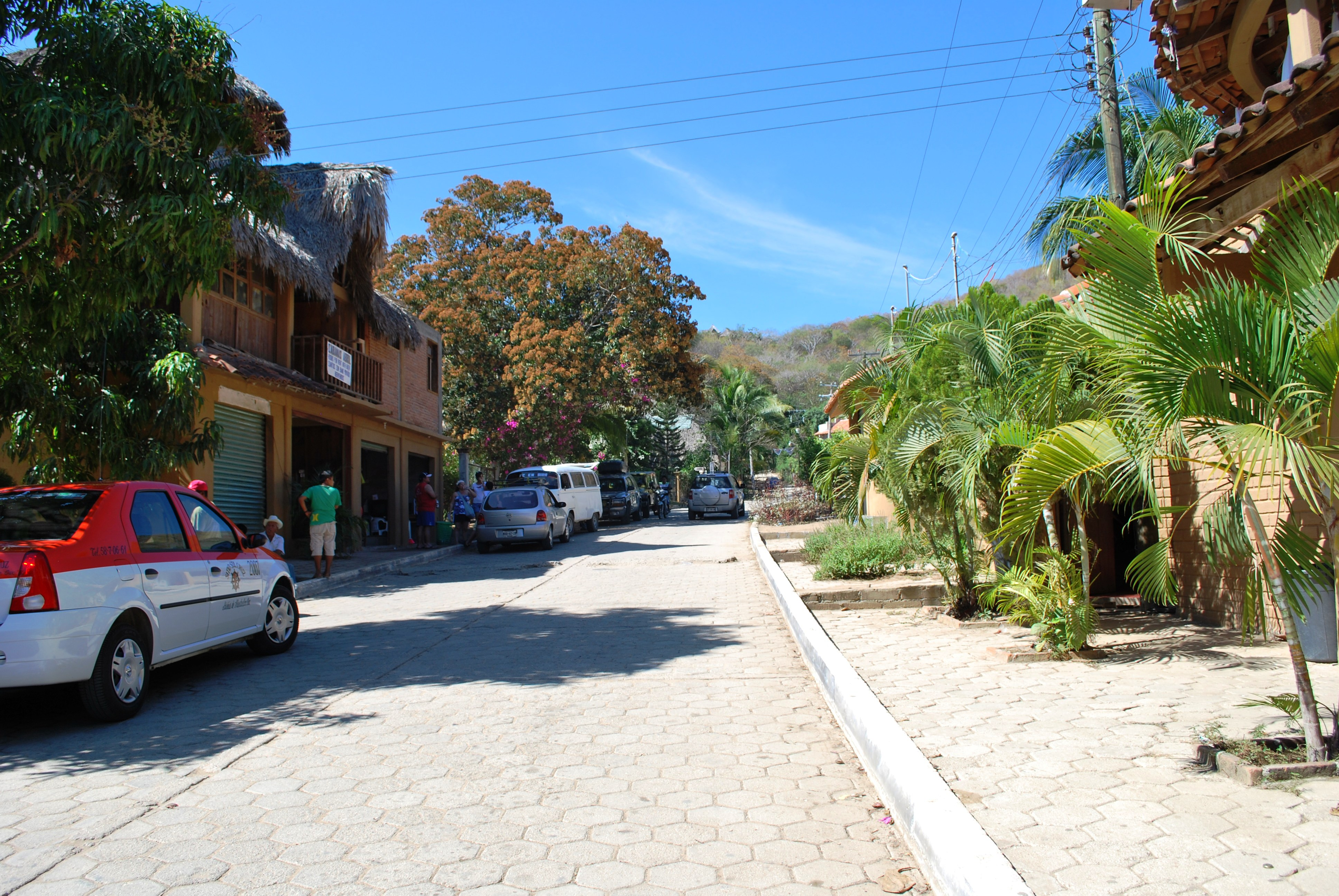
Main street of Mazunte

Mazunte is a small village wedged between a wide, one km long beach and the Sierra Madre del Sur. Parallel to the beach is the Avenida Paseo del Mazunte, the main street, which connects the village with others nearby. The area has mostly deciduous trees which drop leaves in the dry season. About twenty different species can be found here as well as a number of cactus and mangroves. It is still mostly a rural village, with mornings filling with the sound of roosters crowing. The village is somewhat larger than San Agustinillo, but the main distinction is that its architecture is based on the use of natural materials. Mazunte has building codes that stipulate that all constructions must blend with already existent structures. The community has strict rules about how, where and what to build in the community. Part of the reason for this is to discourage land speculation and over development.

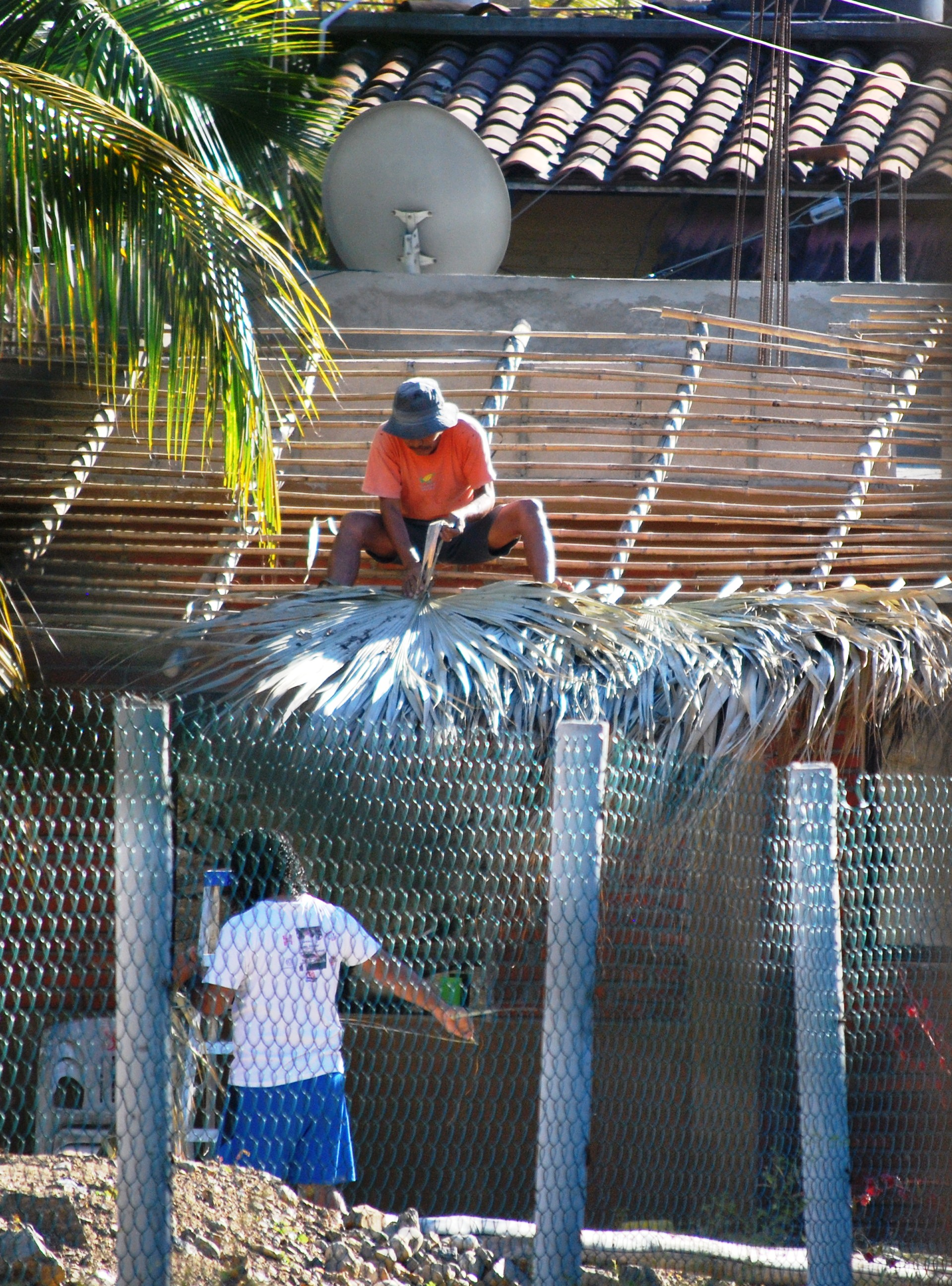
Building palapa roof with palm fronds

Guido Rocco is simply called “the Italian” or “the architect” and is well known and respected for building many of the eco-friendly cabins and other buildings here, which he calls “bio-architecture.” These structures consists mostly of palm fronds, adobe, bamboo, shells stones coconut shells and wood, designed to blend in with the landscape. He arrived in Mazunte in the late 1980s and has remained since. He and his family first arrived in the 1970s as visitors when there were no roads and Mazunte was accessible only by boat. Other Italians have immigrated to Mazunte and other towns along this stretch of coast. Their presence is most easily seen in the Italian restaurants that have been established, some of which offer pizza cooked in a wood-fired oven.

Cosméticos Naturales de Mazunte is a community enterprise dedicated to making high quality make-up that is 100% environmentally friendly. This began a decade ago with the sponsorship of British company The Body Shop, and the Mexican federal government. This and other projects were also supported by non-governmental agencies such as the embassies of Canada, France and England as well as universities such as Stanford, National Polytechnic Institute and National Autonomous University of Mexico, which helped with industrial design, knowledge of local products and cosmetics making. The cooperative produces shampoo, conditioner, bath gels, soap and other items and is a tourist attraction as well, with tour busses parking in front to let visitors see how the cooperative works and to shop. The cooperative has the slogan of “el milagro de Mazunte” (the miracle of Mazunte).

The Mazunte Jazz Festival was begun in 2005 and is held annually. It is one of the largest in Oaxaca state. The 2009 Jazz festival included artists such as Kati Mejía of the U.S., Samuel Piña of Tabasco state, the Adrian Oropeza Trio, the Jazz Oaxaca Big Band as well as Flamenco guitarist David Jenkins.

The annual Fiesta de Mazunte, held in January, includes events such as floats, a Miss Bikini contest and a needlefish fishing contest.

Public transportation in Mazunte is based on pick up trucks that have been outfitted to carry passengers as well as cargo. These “camionetas” connect Mazunte with nearby La Ventanilla to the west, and San Agustinillo, Zipolite, Puerto Angel and the city of Pochutla eastward.

== The beaches ==
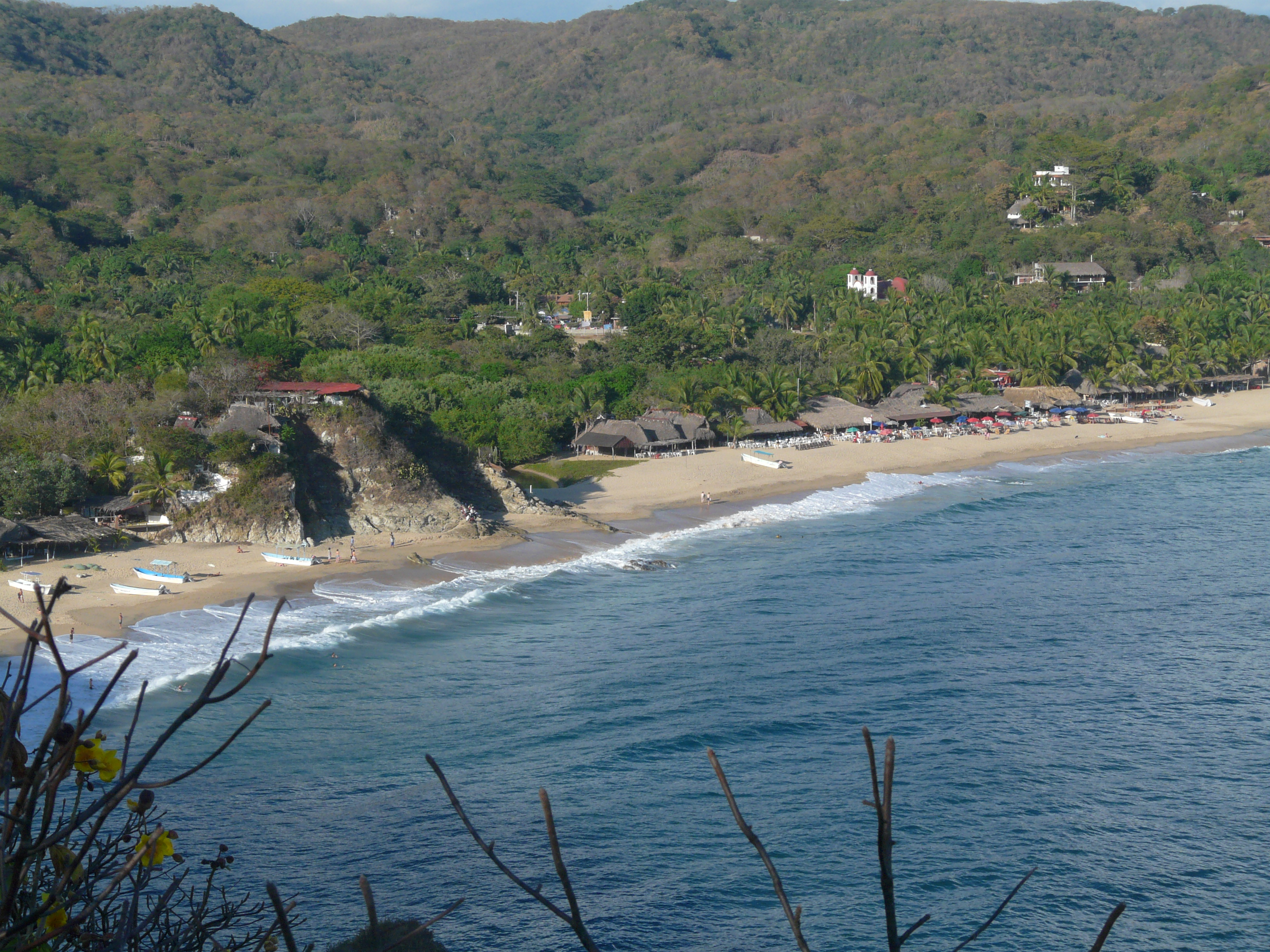
View of Mazunte beach from Punta Cometa

Mazunte is a 1 kilometre (0.62 mi) stretch of beach with a secluded cove on the far west end. Boats on this beach offer tours to Zipolite, Puerto Ángel, Estacahuite, La Mina and La Boquilla. Depending on the season, it is possible to see whales, dolphins, sea turtles, manta rays and other aquatic species. Rentals for sports fishing are also available. The main beach and the cove on the west end both have a number of small hotels and restaurants. All beaches have lifeguards during the tourist seasons. There are two other secluded and non-developed beaches in the area, Playa Mermejita on Punta Cometa and Playa Escobilla just west of the principle beaches.

All but one of the marine turtles come to the Mazunte area to lay their eggs, as well as a few land and freshwater turtle species. The Pacific coast town of Mazunte is famous for its sea turtles. Thousands of olive ridley sea turtles arrive en masse to lay their eggs in nearby Escobilla Bay. The nesting season generally begins in May and lasts for several months. Although an endangered species, the turtles come to the beach in large numbers for a few nights after a full moon. These events are called arribadas. Other turtles that lay eggs here are the Hawksbill turtle, the “prieta” (a subspecies of green turtle), and some leatherback turtles. In 1997, The Centro Mexicano de Tortuga counted the arrival of about 900,000 sea turtles to La Escobilla beach alone.

Volunteers from the Center monitor nesting areas in and around Mazunte. When females come onto the beaches at night, generally just after a full moon, they are measured, tagged and their eggs collected for incubation at the center. The process ends with the liberation of the hatchlings from the same beaches they were collected from. On many of these occasions, the public may participate in the freeing of the hatchlings.

== National Mexican Turtle Center ==
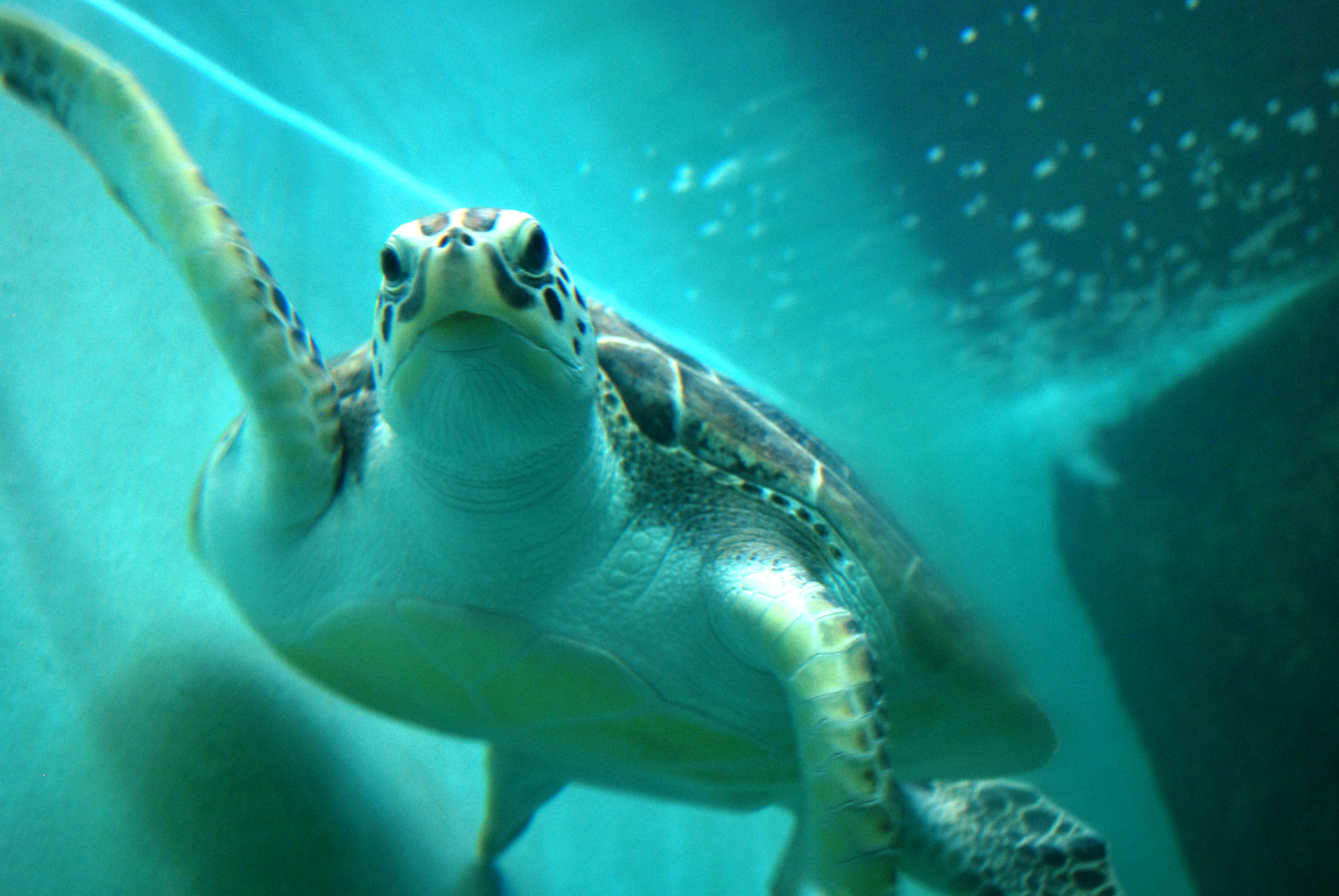
Hawksbill turtle in the aquarium of the Center

The idea of promoting sea turtles as an ecotourism base began in the 1970s when the hunting of sea turtles in Mazunte and other nearby seaside communities was at its height. An organization to promote the idea was founded at that time, which became a small center in 1985, operated by the Instituto Nacional de la Pesca (National Fishing Institute) and named Daniel León de Guevara.

The modern Centro Mexicano de la Tortuga (Mexican National Turtle Center) was founded by the federal government in 1991 after the sea turtle trade was completely banned in the country. The Centro Mexicano de la Tortuga is an aquarium and research center dedicated to turtles, especially sea turtles. The installation covers four hectares located in Mazunte right next to the beach, near where the sea turtle slaughterhouse used to be. The Center contains specimens of all marine turtles native to Mexico as well as six species of fresh water and two species of land turtles also found in the country. It contains tanks and other habitats in which a variety of turtle species can be seen. The buildings on the site are designed to be similar to those around it, both traditional and modern. Outdoor tanks hold turtle species of different ages and include both natural and artificial incubators for turtle eggs. The installation also contains a multipurpose room, gift shop and a cactus garden. Research objectives include developing techniques to manage, increase and preserve the turtle species of the country as well as promoting knowledge and ecological tourism based on turtles. This facility receives 60,000 visitors a year.

== Punta Cometa ==
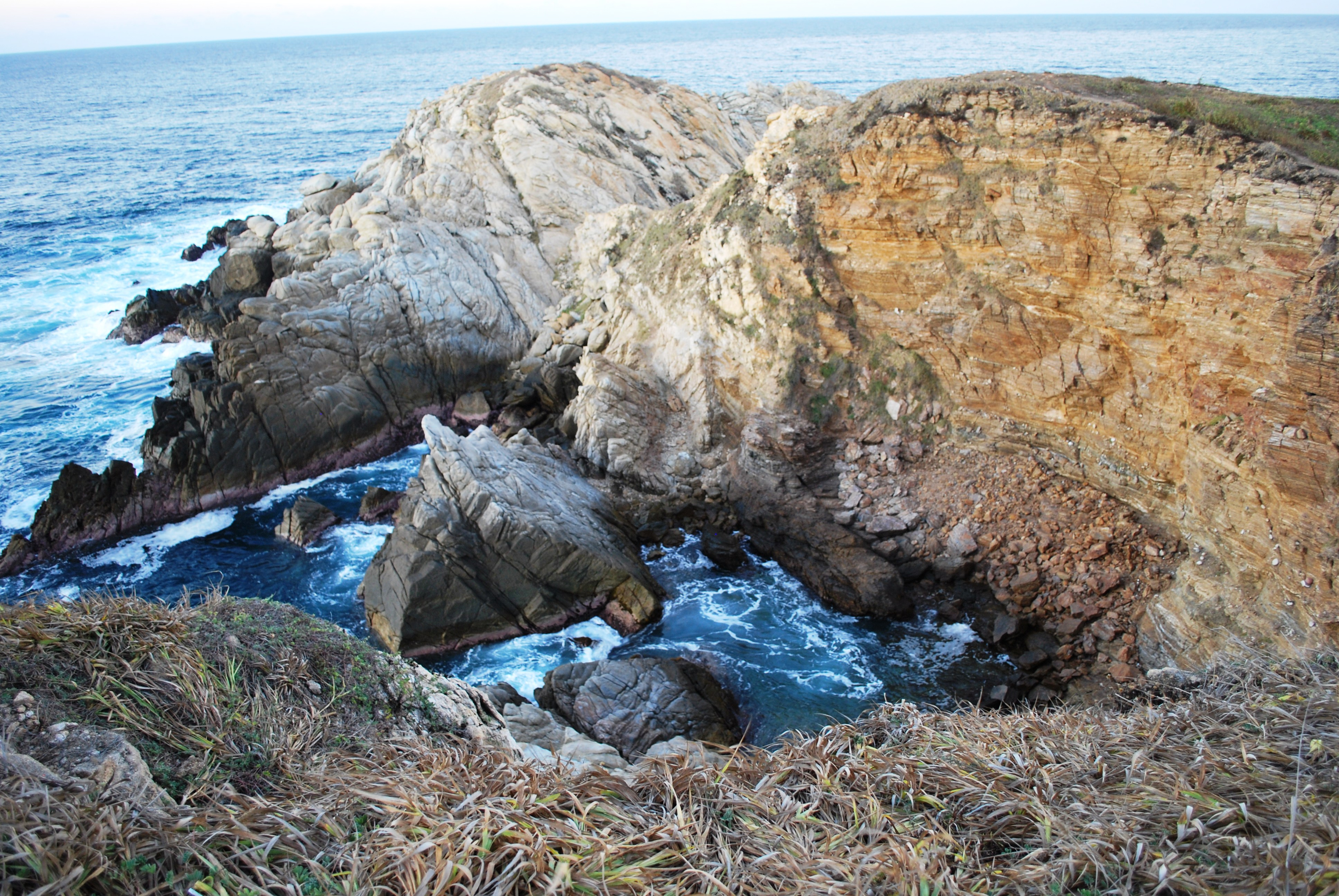
Tip of Punta Cometa jutting into the Pacific Ocean

The far west end of Mazunte beach is bordered by Punta Cometa (Comet Point), which is a small peninsula or mountain that juts out from the shoreline. Punta Cometa is also called Cerro Sagrado or “Sacred Hill”. It is the southernmost point of the state of Oaxaca and an important stopping place for migratory birds and marine mammals such as whales. There is also a small virgin beach called Mermejita on the west side.

In pre-Hispanic times this area was a military enclave of the Aztecs, who constructed a small wall around Punta Cometa, the remains of which are locally called the “corral de piedra” or stone corral. During the colonial period, the area was a stronghold for both Spanish forces and pirates who used Punta Cometa's location to survey the seas at 180 degrees of visibility. There are also stories about Aztec and or pirate treasure hidden at Punta Cometa.
