= San Agustinillo =

- Town
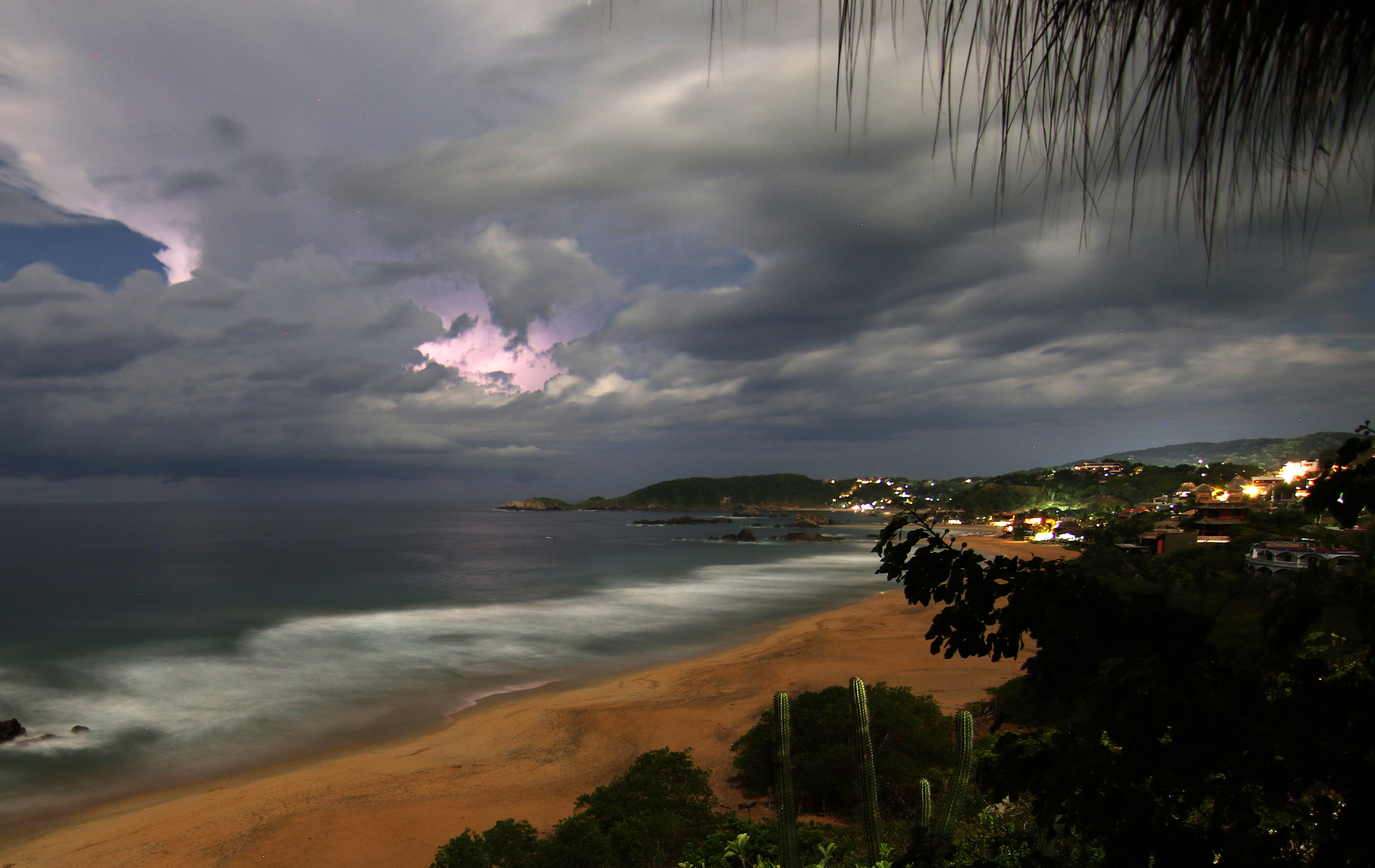
- Lightning above the coastline of San Agustinillo at night.

- Location in Mexico
- Coordinates: 15°39′58″N 96°32′32″W
- Country: Mexico
- State: Oaxaca
- Municipality: Santa María Tonameca
- Elevation: 25 m (82 ft)

Population (2005)
  - Total: 229
- Time zone: UTC-6 (CST)
- Area code: 958

San Agustinillo is a small fishing village and beach in the state of Oaxaca, Mexico. It is located in the municipality of Santa María Tonameca just east of the coastal communities of Mazunte and La Ventanilla. This is where the Sierra Madre del Sur mountains meet the Pacific Ocean.

San Agustinillo is connected by a road to Zipolite and Puerto Ángel to the west. All these coastal communities together are known as the "Riviera Oaxaqueña or "La Costa Chica Oaxaqueña.

== Transportation ==
The local Highway 175 makes a loop south from the main coastal Highway 200. From Pochutla, Highway 175 first goes south to Puerto Ángel, then west along the coast to Zipolite, San Agustinillo, and Mazunte. After that, it continues back north again to rejoin the main Highway 200. The local 'colectivos' buses make trips from Pochutla in both directions.

== History ==
The community was established about the same time as Mazunte. Fishermen in San Augustinillo made a living by hunting sea turtles until this was banned in 1990. Major economic activities here for most residents are still agriculture and small scale fishing, with some tourism, based on the beach.

== The beach ==
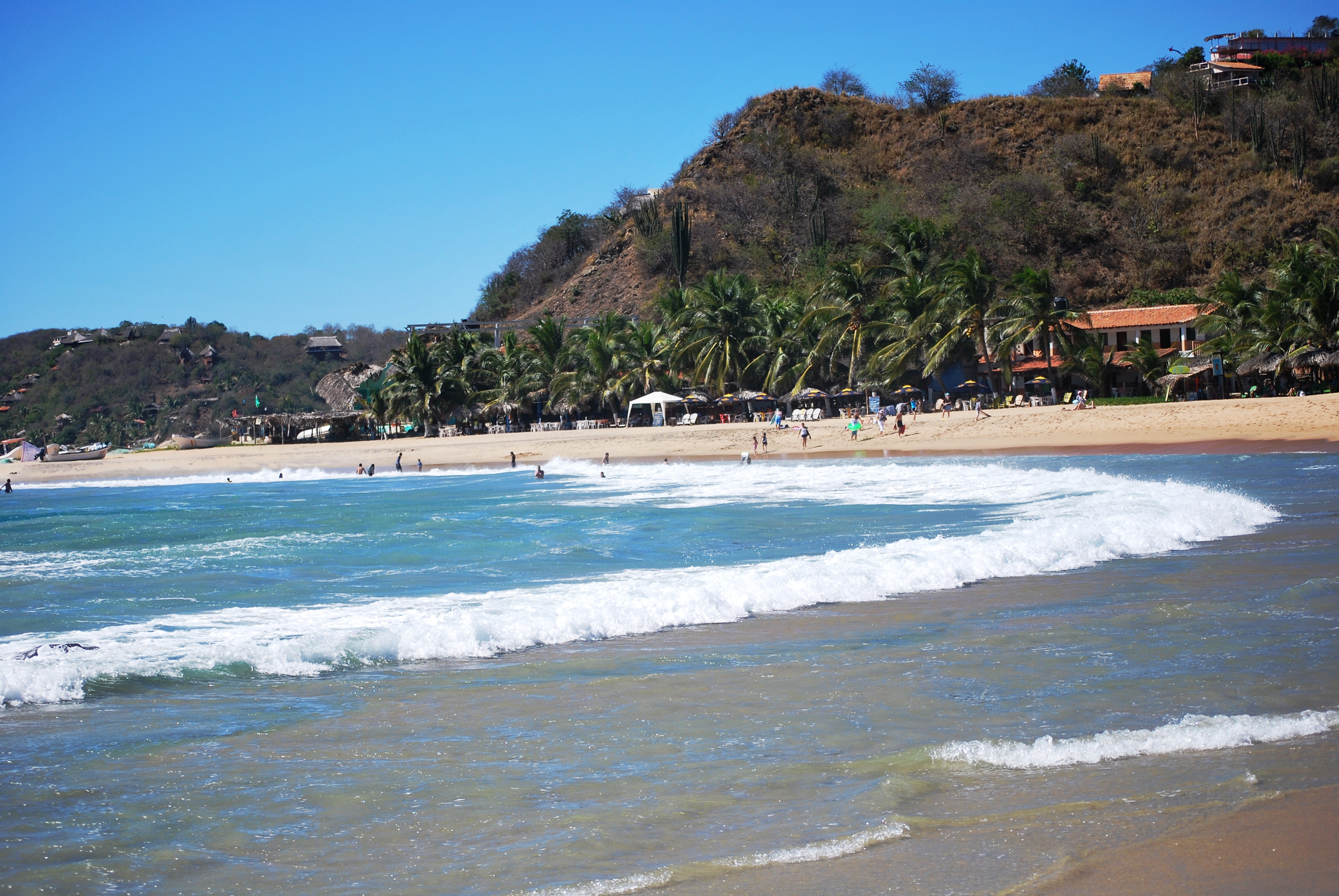
Playa Rinconcito at San Agustinillo.

The beach of San Agustinillo is about 1300 meters long, facing open ocean, and divided into three sections by rocky outcroppings that jut out from the beach into the Pacific Ocean. The sands of the beach are medium grain, of gold color, and spread as wide as fifty meters. The waters just offshore are warm with green and blue tones. The far west end is called Playa Rinconcito, which is relatively well-sheltered and considered safest for swimming. The easternmost section is called Playa Aragon and has both strong waves and strong undertow. As these beaches face open ocean caution is advised, especially when tropical waves and other weather phenomena cause abnormally high waves, which can cause beach restrictions and closures. In 2009, at least three drownings were reported off this beach, including a six-year-old girl who was caught while on the shoreline by an unusually high wave. A nineteen-year-old was dragged out to sea when he was surprised by an undercurrent, and his body was not found until five days later.

The fishing village is located at the far west end at Playa Rinconcito. The fishermen offer boat tours of the area as well as rental for sportsfishing. Just immediately to the east of the village are palapas but almost nothing has been built at the far eastern end. From June to December it is possible to see olive ridley turtles laying their eggs on this beach.

== Local businesses ==
The beach is encroached by hills and steep cliffs that make the building of large hotels and other resort features impossible. However, the shoreline and some of the hills surrounding it are dotted with small rustic establishments which show ecological and European influence. The European influence is because a number of establishments here are owned by Italians and some French.

Since the area emphasizes eco tourism, many of the lodgings here were built as "low-impact" that blend in with the topography. One of this is La Posada del Arquitecto which is carved into the rocks of Playa Rinconcito. The rooms have hanging beds and a shower built into a tree trunk. Everything is constructed with wooden pegs instead of nails. Many of the lodgings here do not have websites or even phones but are popular with backpackers nonetheless. None have running hot water. Most hotels do not have televisions, phone or wireless connections, or air conditioning.

== The library ==
The library of San Agustinillo is called "Las cuatro amigas" referring to the four women who opened it in the Casa Municipal (municipal office building) on Highway 175. The library is free to residents, and tourists may borrow books for a nominal fee. About half the collection is in Spanish, about half in English, and the rest in other languages such as French and German. The library also offers English classes for the children of the town. The organization that runs the library has a website at La Biblioteca de San Agustinillo.
