= Playa de Escobilla Sanctuary =

Protected area in Oaxaca, Mexico

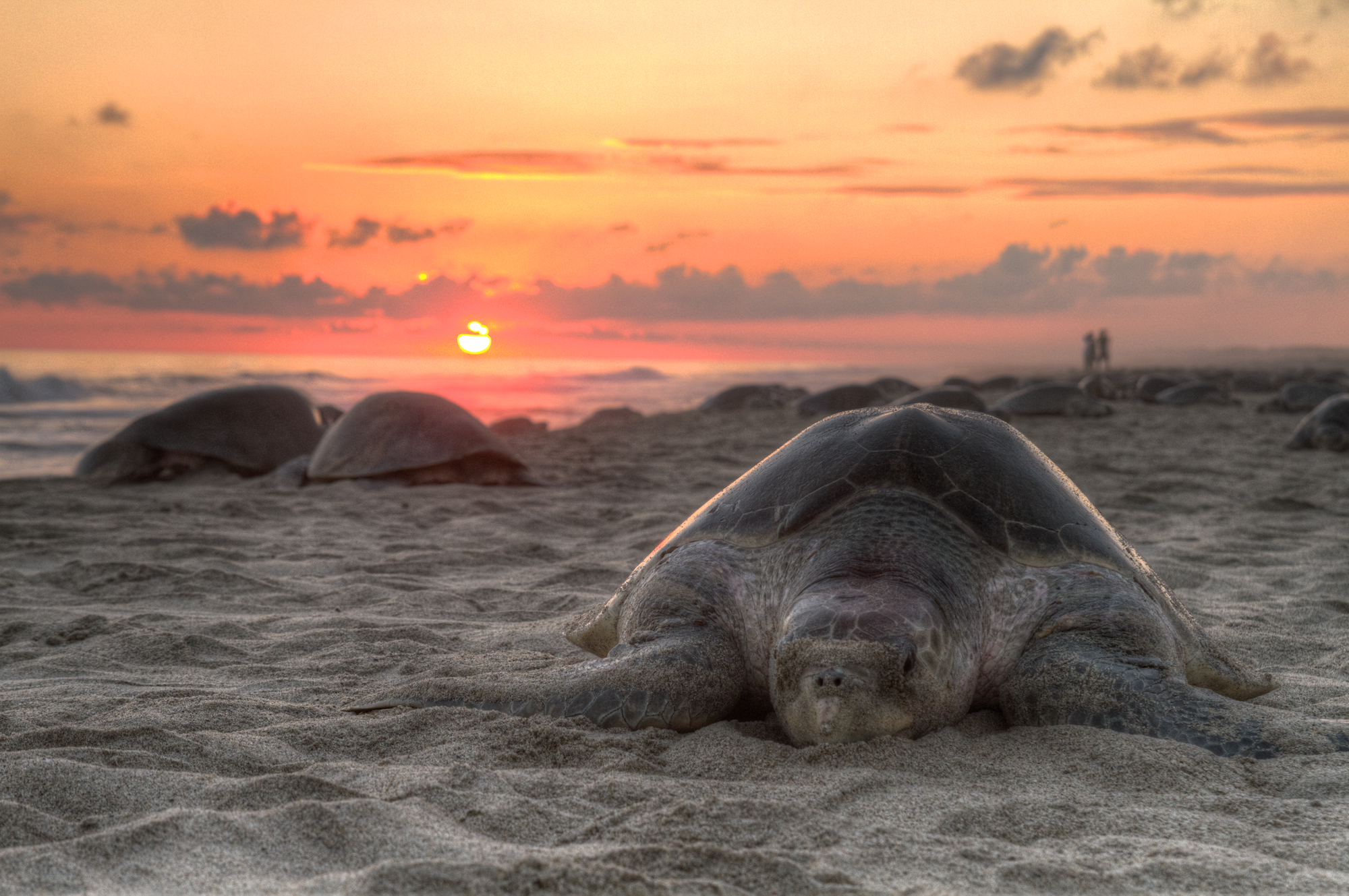
Olive ridley turtles nesting on Escobilla Beach

Playa de Escobilla Sanctuary is a waterfront sanctuary for sea turtles in the Mexican state of Oaxaca, with an area of about 30 hectares. The sanctuary lies in Santa María Tonameca Municipality, between the towns of Puerto Escondido and Huatulco near the town of Mazunte. In order to protect the turtles, the beach is guarded during nesting season and is off-limits to tourists. However, during this season (July to September) visitors can join overnight trips to observe the olive ridley turtles heaving themselves on shore to lay their eggs. These trips help support the local economy, and must be arranged in advance through the Centro Mexicano de la Tortuga.
