= Santa María Tonameca =

Tonameca
- Town & Municipality
- Santa María Tonameca
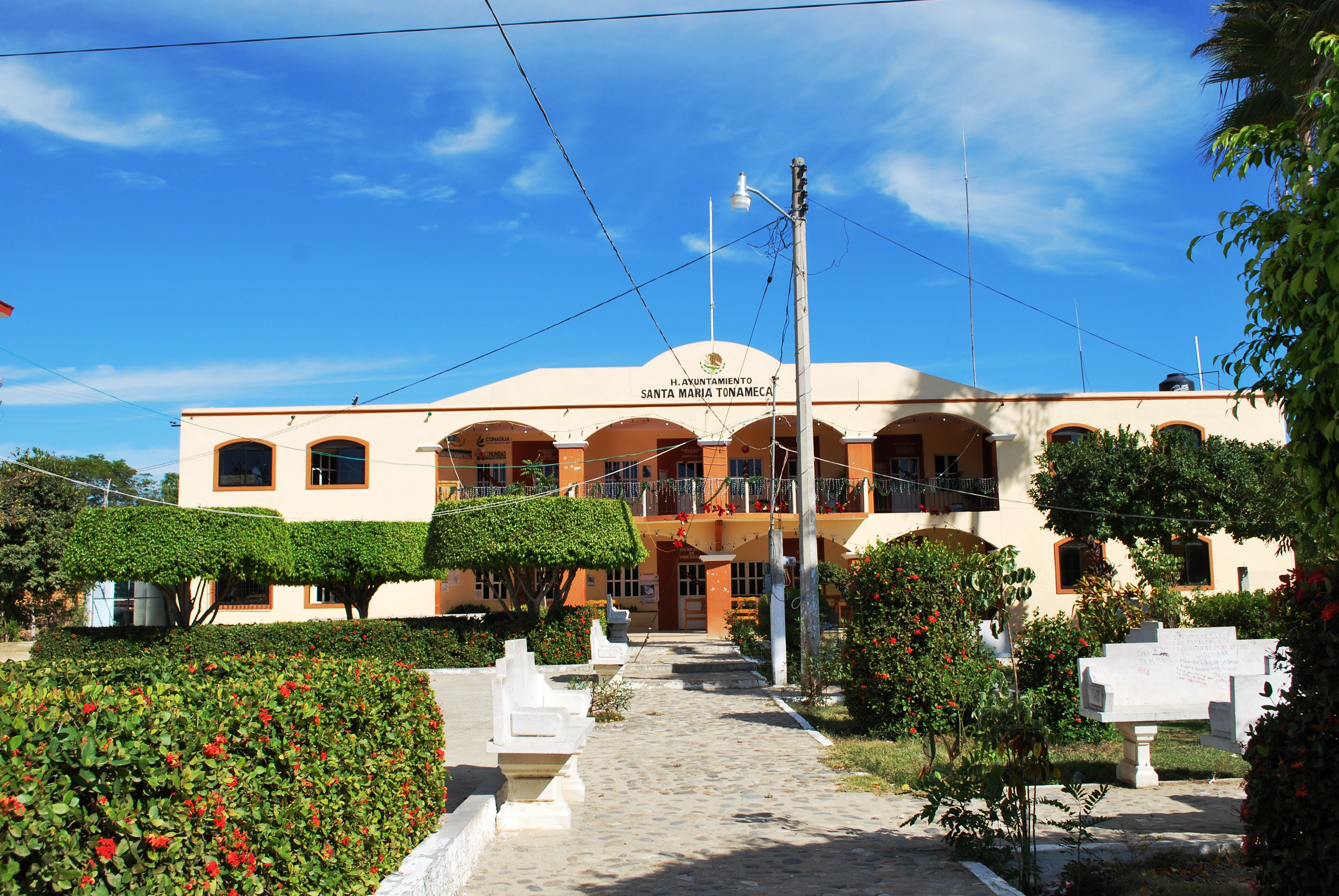
- Municipal Palace

- Location in Mexico
- Coordinates: 15°44′45″N 96°32′50″W
- Country: Mexico
- State: Oaxaca

Government
  - Municipal President: Fernando Mendoza Reyes (2014-2016)

Area
  - Municipality: 454.2 km^{2} (175.4 sq mi)
- Elevation (of seat): 40 m (130 ft)

Population (2005) Municipality
  - Municipality: 21,223
  - Seat: 1,631
- Time zone: UTC-6 (Central (US Central))
- Postal code (of seat): 70946

Santa María Tonameca is a town and municipality located on the southern coast of Oaxaca, Mexico, about 268 km from the capital city of Oaxaca. It is part of the Pochutla District in the east of the Costa Region. It is a very rural area, which is best known for the beach communities of Mazunte, San Agustinillo and La Ventanilla. The National Turtle Center, a research center and aquarium is located in Mazunte, along with conservation centers for butterflies and iguanas. The town itself is the site of the largest annual festival in the area, celebrating the rescue of a cedar image of the Virgin Mary from the rubble of the town church after an earthquake on 11 May 1870.

== History ==
The name Tonameca is derived from two Nahuatl words "tonahili" (sun or day) and "mecatl" (place of origin) which can be translated as "where the people of the sun live." Santa María refers the Virgin of the Assumption, the patron of the municipality. This area was under the influence of the empire of Tututepec, and the main language was Pochutec, closely related to Nahuatl. The town made offerings and sacrifices to an idol called Telpochtli ("Young Man").

After the conquest, the area was governed first by Pedro de Alvarado, and then by Hernán Cortés, who then ceded the area to Gonzalo de Salazar. As in other parts of Mexico, most of the land here was controlled via the encomendero system, where natives not only had to work to meet their own needs but also to meet the demands of the Spanish overlords. One of the largest encomenderos here was owned by D. Tristano de Arellando, called Tututepec, who eventually took control of what was still Indian land to form an hacienda. Eventually, Tristano's greed and maltreatment of the natives here got the attention of viceregal authorities and he was stripped of the encomendero. The land now known as Tonameca came under the control of Petrona Quiahua, who was a descendant of native chiefs. She suffered the genetic "pinto" skin color disorder that still affects a number of the population here. She managed to keep this area out of the hands of Tristano from then on.

In 1870, the main Catholic church of the town was destroyed. However, an image of the Virgin sculpted in cedar was found intact in the rubble. Each year this "miracle" is celebrated. In 1997, the municipality was heavily affected by Hurricane Pauline and again by Hurricane Rick. The second had heavy rains which flooded river causing extensive crop and structure damage.

The drug war of the 2000s has seen battles here. For example, federal police tried to stop two vehicles on Highway 200 in the municipality as they matched the description of vehicles associated with suspected drug traffickers. A pursuit followed with the suspects opening fire on the uniformed police. Being outgunned, the police called to Puerto Escondido for backup but the vehicles escaped.

In 2009, the municipal president, Mardonio Lopez Garcia, inaugurated new classrooms for the primary school in the seat and ecological latrines for the community of Zoluta, which belongs to the municipality. The latrines were built to be environmentally conscious and provide a needed service to this community of scarce resources. Plans were also announced for a school to be built in the community of Macahuite and El Macuil.

== The town ==
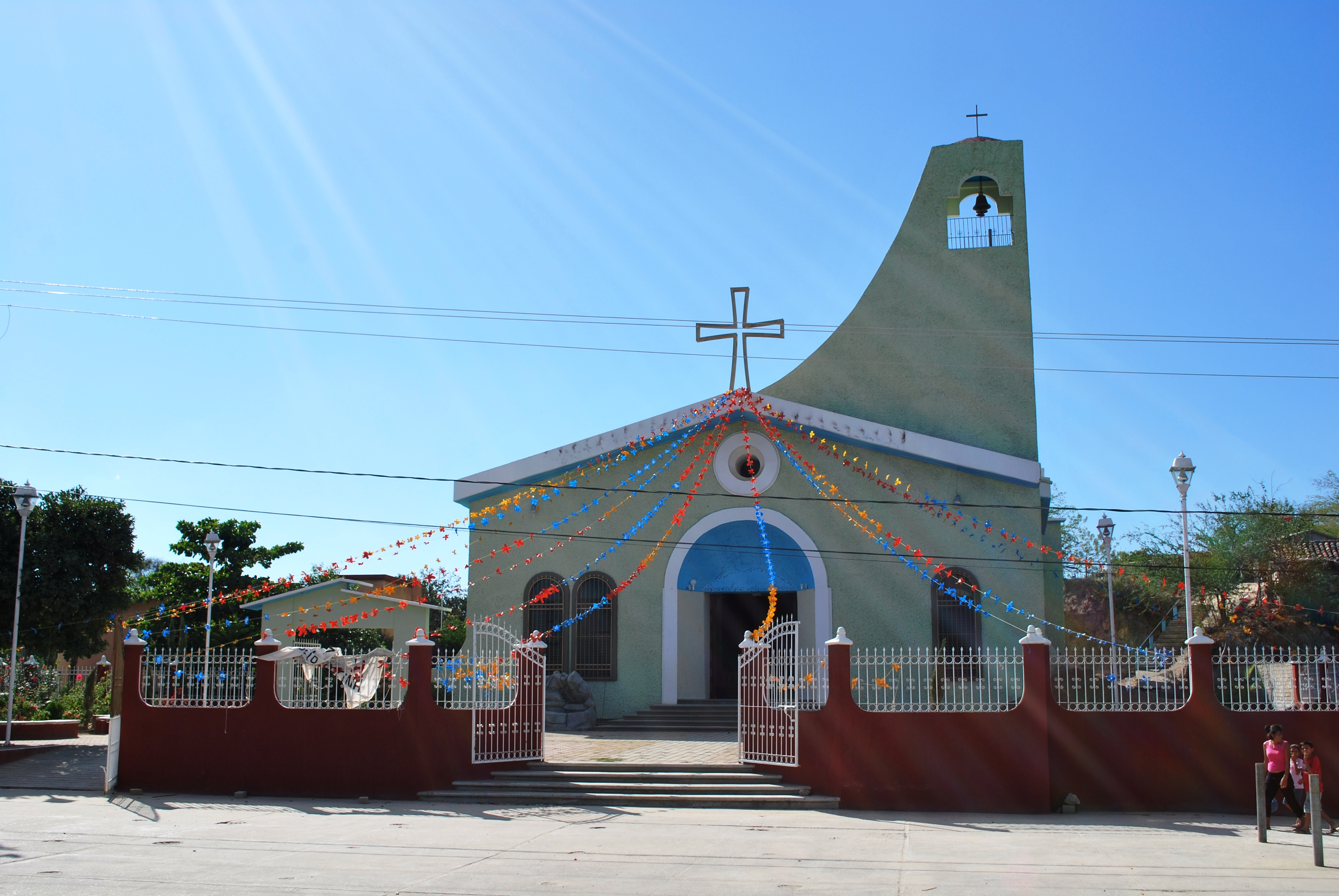
The church of Santa Maria Tonameca

The town itself is a small town of only 1,631 people (as of 2005), with only eight percent of the municipality's population living in the town proper. It is not the largest community in the municipality either, with San Francisco Cozoaltepec having 1,945 people. However, the town hosts the major festival of the region which is held on 11 May. The patroness of the town and municipality is the Virgin Mary, who is celebrated twice a year. The first is the traditional day of the Assumption and the other is in May. The May date corresponds to the day when the town church was destroyed by an earthquake on 11 May 1870. Underneath the rubble the cedar image of Mary was found unharmed and is considered to be a miracle.

Like in the rest of Mexico, this festival is a mix of Catholic and pre-Hispanic practices and serves as one of the way the town preserves its social cohesion and culture. Dance features heavily in these rituals as well as ritual intoxication. The festival in May for the Virgin Mary actually lasts eight days. First is the “convite” when invitations are sent to various communities to participate. Next is the election of the Queen of the Festival as well as a “Corn Goddess” who represents the goddess Centoalt, a practice derived from pre-Hispanic times. Mass is then celebrated, which is followed by a procession through the town with guests, accompanied by mascots, children in masks and dress similar to that of Carnival. This procession ends at the main church's atrium. “Las Mañanitas” (a song of congratulations) is sung and on 10 May Mothers Day is celebrated at the same time. On the morning of 11 May is another Mass called the “Misa de Aurora” which commences at 5 am. This hour is considered to be “God’s time” and attendees consume hot chocolate and a type of egg bread. Later in the morning, representative from various communities gather at the main bring into the municipal seat to march carrying banners of their communities’ patron saints. After this are various attractions such as cockfights, rodeo, folk dance and fireworks. The day ends with a “dance of gratitude” in the evening and then the festival's organizers offer drinks and sweets to attendees. The festival closes with music played by hired musicians.

Other festivals which are celebrated here include the feast of Saint John and the day of Assumption. Both these days feature folk dance, rodeo and music, especially Pochutla “sones” and chilenas.

== Demographics ==
Tonameca is the only area which has a mixed African/Indian race population which is locally called “Abajeña.” This group developed from a number of African slaves that were introduced here. These people generally have black skin, with sharp facial features and wooly hair. Some individuals’ skin is somewhat sallow. There is another subgroup called “pintos” or “Ñutis” who have patches of yellow, black, red, white and even blue on their skin due to a genetic mutation. These people tend to be ostracized from the rest of the community and the trait is becoming rarer.

The main native ethnic group is the southern branch of the Zapotecs with traditional customs surviving in rural communities such as Cerro Gordo, Tigrero, Charco de Agua and others. The municipality has a shared culture with the neighboring communities of the municipality of San Pedro Pochutla, with communities from this municipality participating in events here. The municipality's culture is split by Highway 200, south of which are the beach communities exposed to tourism and north of which is more rural and isolated. Native cultures are better preserved north of the highway.

== The municipality ==
As municipal seat, Santa María Tonameca is the government authority over 150 other communities with a total population of 21,223 people (as of 2005). It is bordered to the north by the Sierra Madre del Sur and by the Pacific Ocean to the south. The highest elevations are Gordo Mountain and Gavilan Mountain. A number of rivers flow through here including the Tonameca, the San Francisco and the Cozoaltepec. There are numerous arroyos which mostly flow during the rainy season. The climate is hot and humid with temperatures rarely going below 27C and with frequent rains in the summer. Various types of palm trees grow here including the coconut palm. There are also some wood trees in the higher elevations. Fruit trees include mango, almond, avocado, orange, zapote and tamarind. Common animals found here are the iguana, deer, coyote, raccoons, armadillos, rabbits and other small mammals. There is also a large number of bird species and reptiles such as rattlesnakes, various lizards, land and sea turtles. Natural resources include the petroleum deposit called Aragón, a marble mine in Cozoaltepc, the Palmar lagoon, forested areas in the higher elevations and the beaches of Escobills, Ventanilla, Mazunte, Mariposario and San Agustinillo. Many of these beaches as well as the Chacahua estuary are considered to be ecological reserves.

Agriculture employs 55% of the population of the municipality growing corn, beans, peanuts, sesame seed, sorghum, watermelon, cucumbers, squash, papaya and other food stuffs. Livestock raised here includes cattle, pigs and domesticated fowl. About five percent of the population is involved in fishing. Twenty percent is dedicated to commerce with only five percent dedicate to tourism which is limited to the beach communities of Mazunte, San Agustinillo, Aragón, Ventanilla, the Chacahua estuary, La Laguna, Barra Tilapa, Escobilla, Barra del Potrero, Tilzapote, Agua Blanca, Santa Elena and Boca Barra de Valdeflores. The municipality contains three conservation centers for three species of animal. The first is the National Turtle Center located in Mazunte; the second is the Mariposario (Butterfly Sanctuary) in the community of Arroyo and the last is the Iguanario in Barra del Potrero, which is dedicated to the iguana. In addition to the Center, Playa Escobilla is dedicated as a nesting place for marine turtles.

Craft objects mostly consist of jewelry and trinkets made from coconut shells, seashells, coral and bamboo. Local dishes include coastal style mole, mole negro with turkey, goat barbacoa and seafood dishes.

== The coastal area of the municipality ==
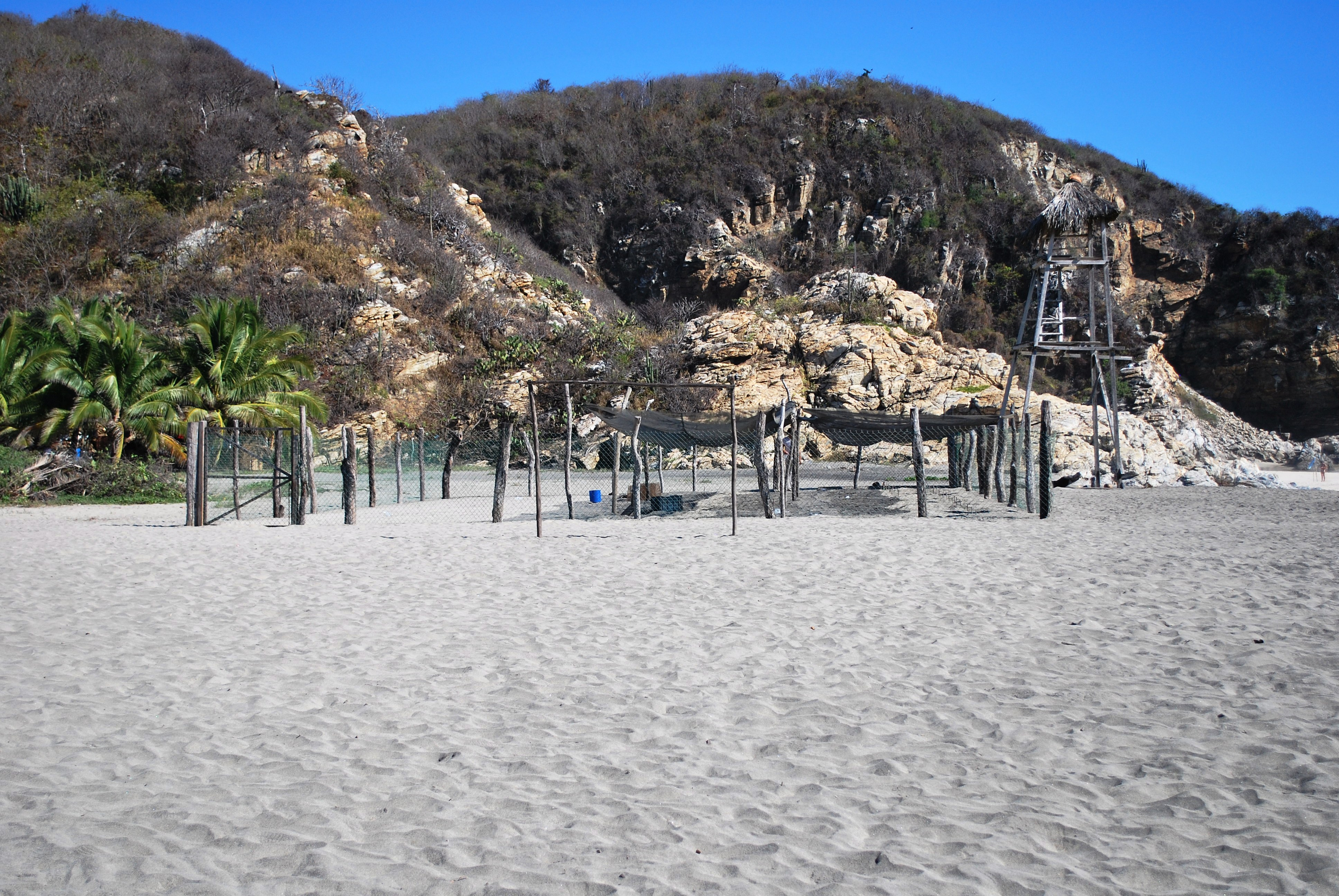
Protected turtle eggs incubating in La Ventanilla

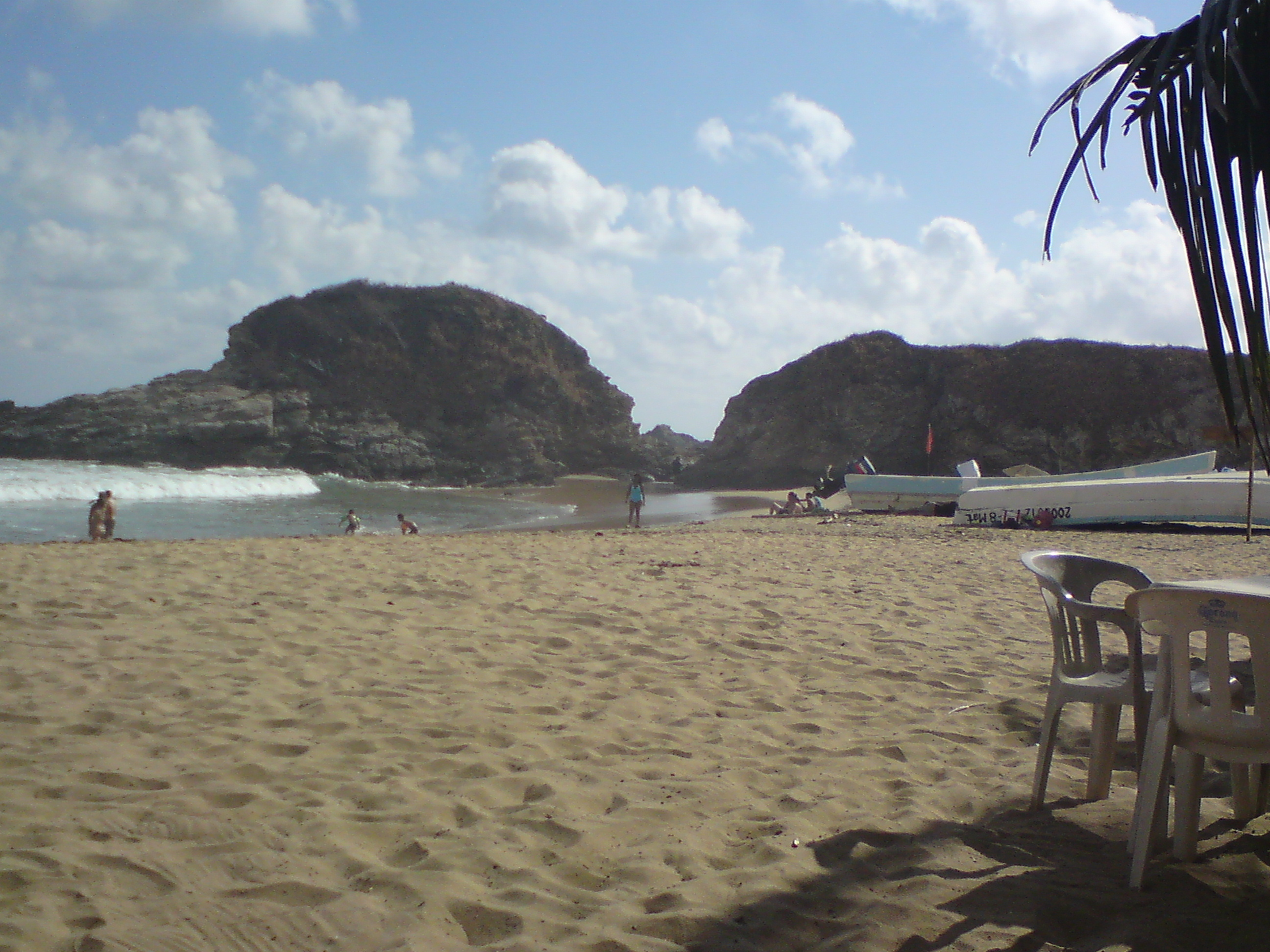
Beach San Agustinillo

The main beaches and tourist attractions for the municipality are the communities of Mazunte, La Ventanilla, San Agustinillo and Agua Blanca. In 2002, most of the Oaxaca coast was designated as turtle sanctuary. The Centro Mexicano de la Tortuga in Mazunte has its origins in turtle research and protection that was begun here in 1967. Efforts to convince the local populations to conserve the species were resisted as people feared for their livelihoods. The federal government banned the hunting of sea turtles and the sale of their meat and eggs to protect the various species that come here to breed.

Playa Escobilla is considered to the sanctuary of the Olive Ridley turtle as a large number of these creatures arrive here to lay their eggs. It is a large green area where forest meets a lagoon. Canoe and guided tours are available to see the areas flora and fauna. The area also has a large organic farm which grows crops such as hibiscus flowers for sale, as well as a restaurant and cabins for rent. Tours generally end with visiting the turtle nests located on the beach. About once a month, up to thousands of turtles will arrive on these beaches to lay their eggs. After this occurs, there are releases of large numbers of baby turtles which have been guarded and incubated by the sanctuary volunteers.
