= Punta Cometa =

Peninsula on the Pacific Coast of Mexico

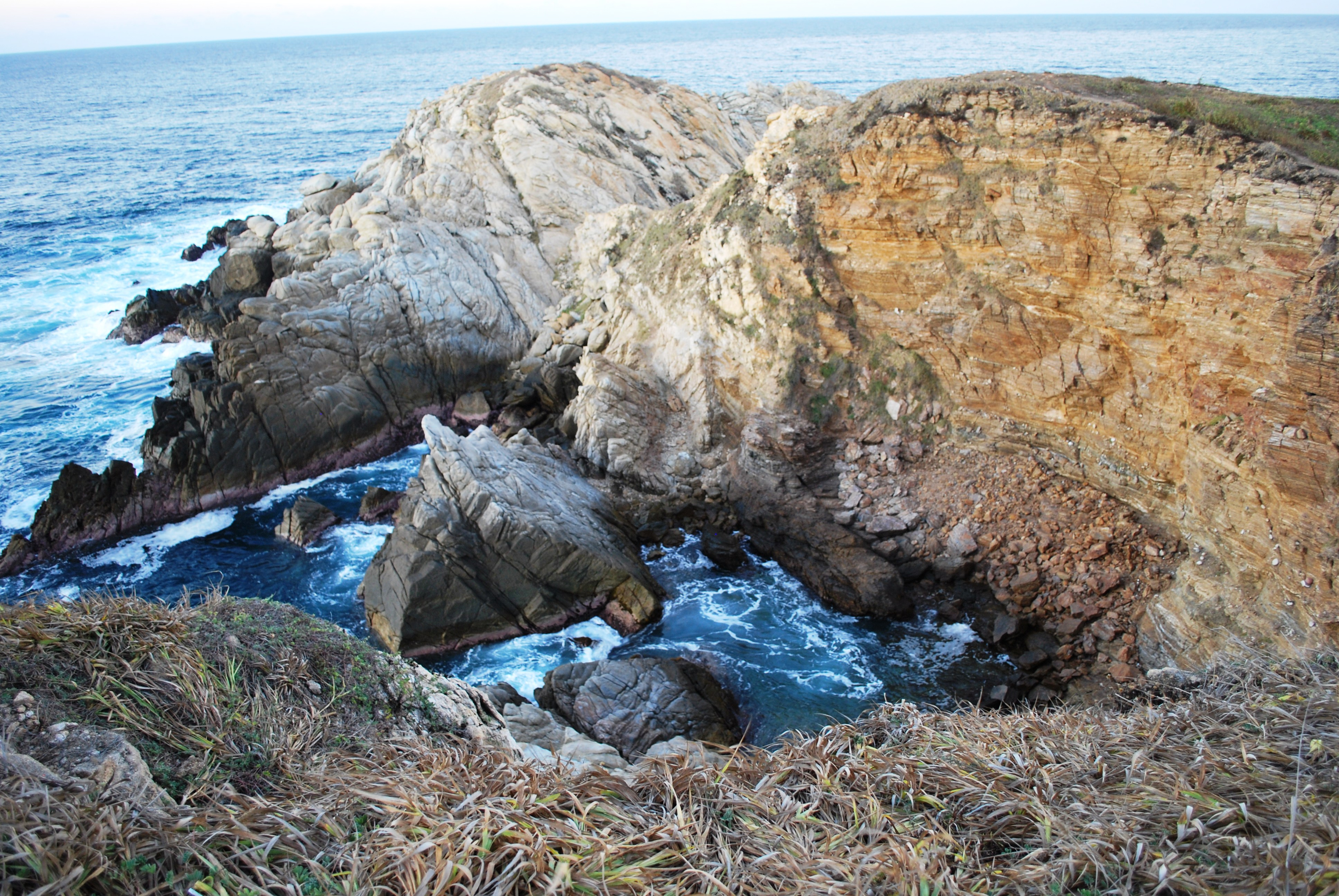

- Location within Mexico

Geography
- Location: Pacific Ocean
- Coordinates: 15°39′30″N 96°33′22″W

Punta Cometa is a peninsula on the Pacific Coast of Mexico.

== Geography ==
It extends into the Pacific Ocean within Mazunte municipality of Oaxaca state, in western Mexico.

It is the southernmost point in the state of Oaxaca.

== See also ==
- Pacific Coast of Mexico
