= La Ventanilla, Oaxaca =

La Ventanilla
- Town
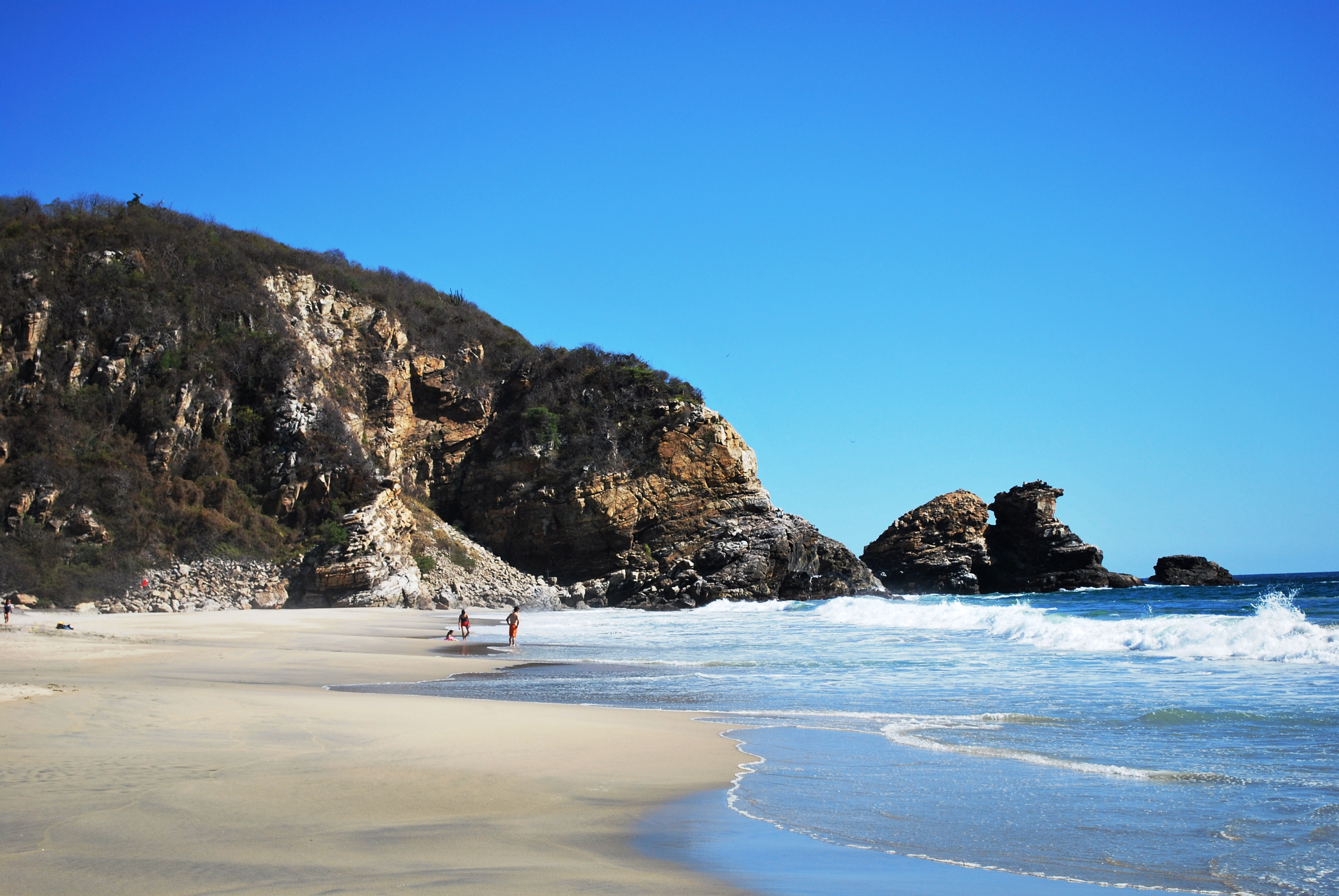
- East end of the beach

- Location in Mexico
- Coordinates: 15°40′19″N 96°34′19″W
- Country: Mexico
- State: Oaxaca
- Municipality: Santa María Tonameca
- Elevation: 50 m (160 ft)

Population (2005)
  - Total: 99
- Time zone: UTC-6 (CST)
- Area code: 958

La Ventanilla is a small village on a beach and lagoon in the municipality of Santa María Tonameca, Oaxaca, Mexico. It is best known as an ecotourism center based on its natural resources. It is located on the Costa Chica section of Oaxaca, just west of Mazunte. The La Ventanilla area consists of a long, unbroken stretch of undeveloped beach and a lagoon wedged between the Pacific Ocean and the Sierra Madre del Sur. In the 1990s, the area was nothing more than a coconut plantation with three families living there, and did not have electricity until 1999. Today, the area is home to about twenty five Zapotec families who are dedicated to preserving the ecology of both the beach and the lagoon and live in a small village located on the far east end of the beach.

== The beach ==
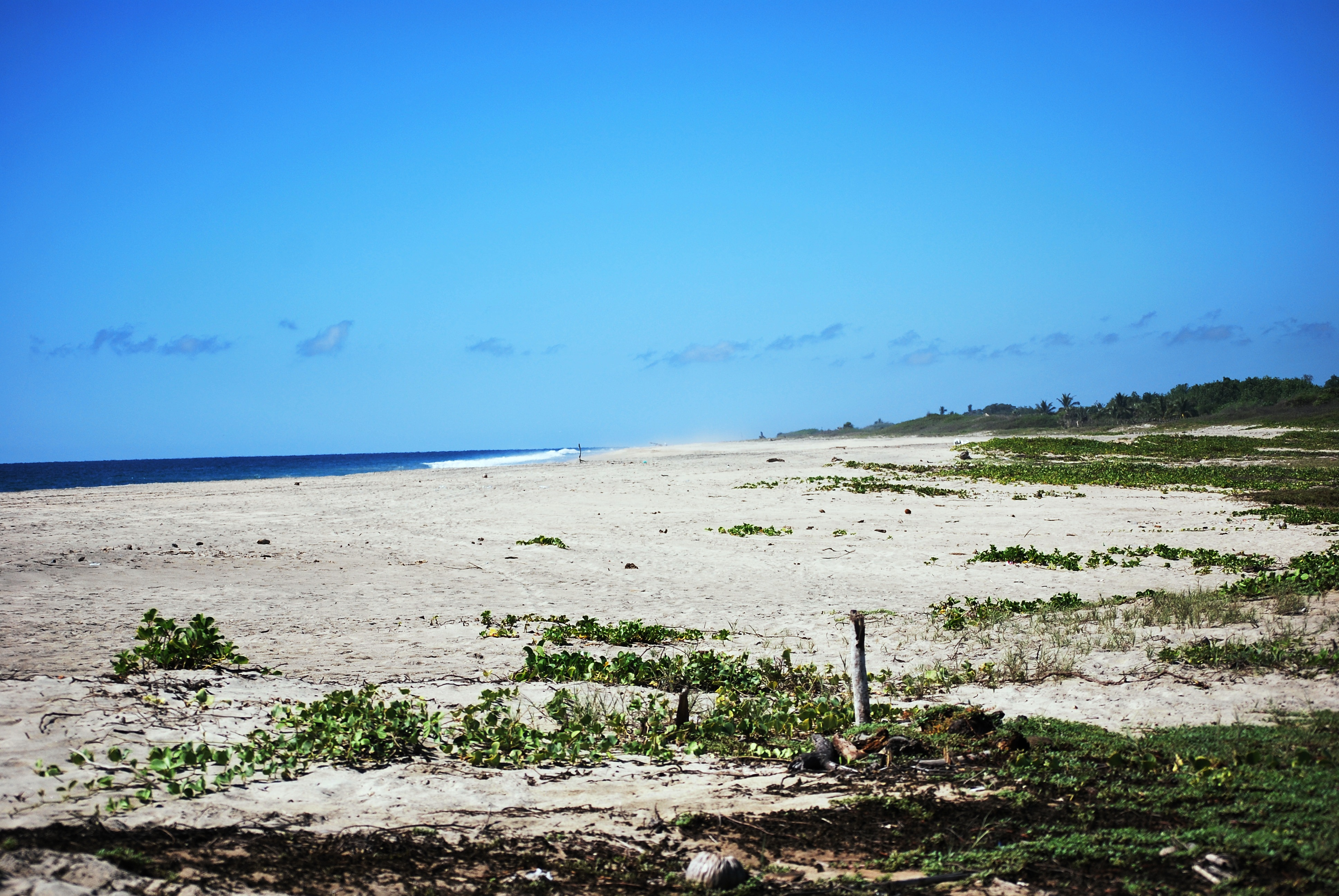
Looking west along the beach

The far east end of the beach is the location of a high rocky peak, which has a small opening that gives the area its name of “little window” or ventanilla. The beach here has fine white sand and warm clear blue waters. This beach continues west unbroken almost all the way to Puerto Escondido. During certain times of the year, hundreds of sea turtles come ashore to lay eggs here. The community volunteers to protect these turtles, even helping tired ones climb up the steep sections of the beach. After the eggs are laid and the turtles return to sea, volunteers gather the eggs to rebury them in a safe spot which is monitored. About three months later, the baby turtles are released back into the ocean.

== The lagoons ==
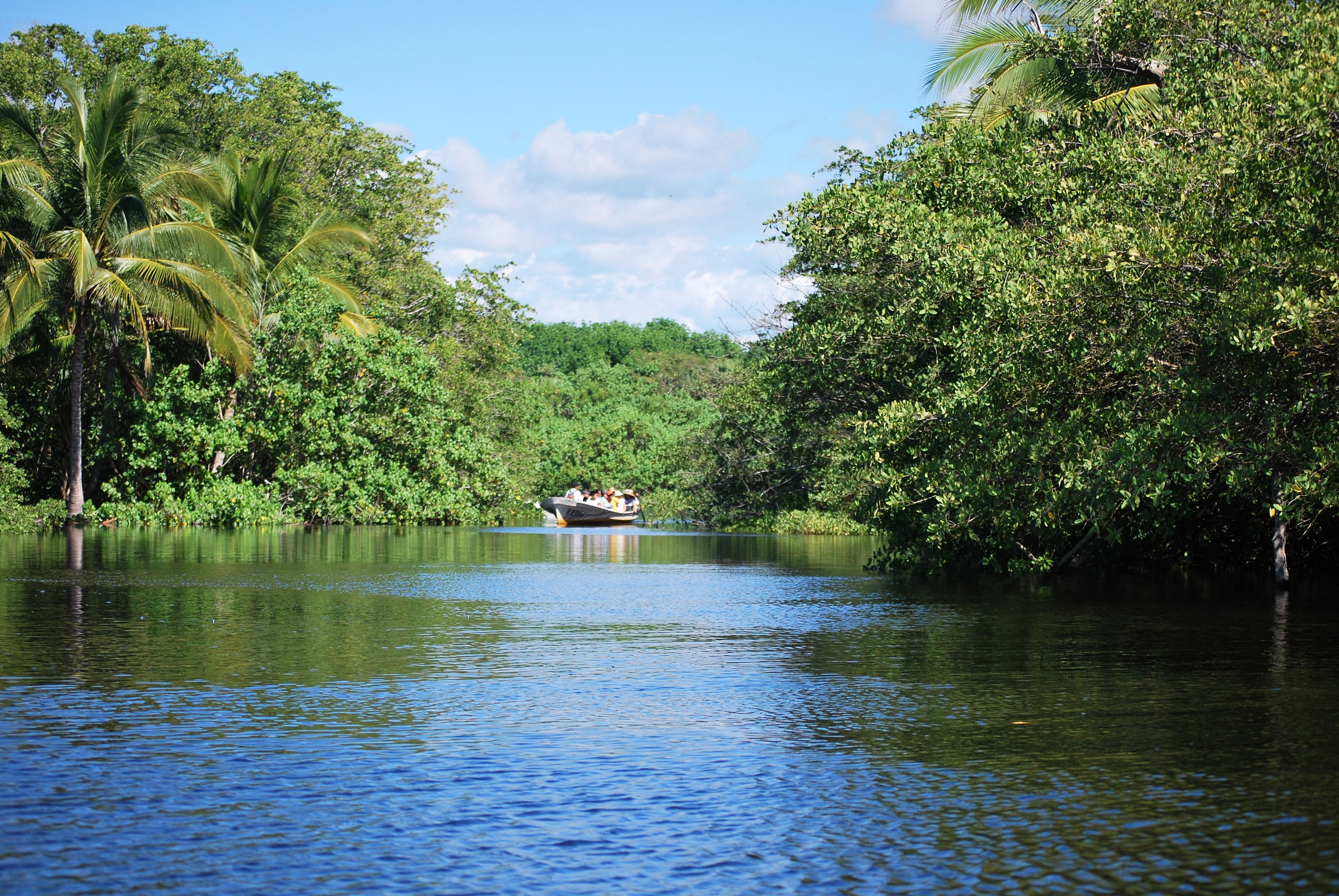
One of the channels in the Tonameca River lagoon

The main attraction, which is unique to this part of the Costa Chica is the lagoon, which is the estuary of the Tonameca River. The lagoon is cut off from the sea by the beach much of the year and is full of mangroves as well as a wide variety of wildlife. The two principle mangrove types here are the red mangrove (Rhizophora mangle) and the white mangrove (Laguncularia racemosa). Tannins from the roots of the red mangrove turn the lagoon's water reddish in the shallows and black in deeper areas. In the mornings, the lagoon fills with the sounds of the many birds that can be found here, including woodpeckers, kingfishers, ducks, storks cormorants, herons and others. The area also has crustaceans, turtles, deer, and iguanas, but what attracts the tourists are the crocodiles. During the rainy season the lagoon meets the sea and prompts sea life such as sea turtles, dolphins and fish to enter to feed on the crustaceans. There is also another mangrove area nearby on the Copalita River. Also nearby is the Rancho El Potrero, where iguanas are hatched and raised.

The lagoon areas as they appear today are in recovery from Hurricanes Pauline and Rick in 1997. The main lagoon was surrounded by tall trees up to thirty five meters in height and filled with mature mangroves. The trees were all destroyed as well as almost all the mangroves, with nothing but red mangrove trunks sticking out of the water. Initial cleanup of the area took residents three weeks and the decision was made to help the zone recover faster by replanting trees and mangroves. Over 30,000 mangroves have been replanted, mostly of the red and white varieties as well as ferns, royal palms, mahogany, parota, ceiba and other plants. The replanting was done principally with seeds collected from the remaining healthy plants and nurtured in greenhouses. When plants where large enough, they were transferred to the lagoon area. Since then, both flora and fauna have recovered significantly.

Due to conservation efforts, the village does not allow motorized vehicles on the beach or within 100 yards of the lagoon sanctuary.

== Ecotourism ==
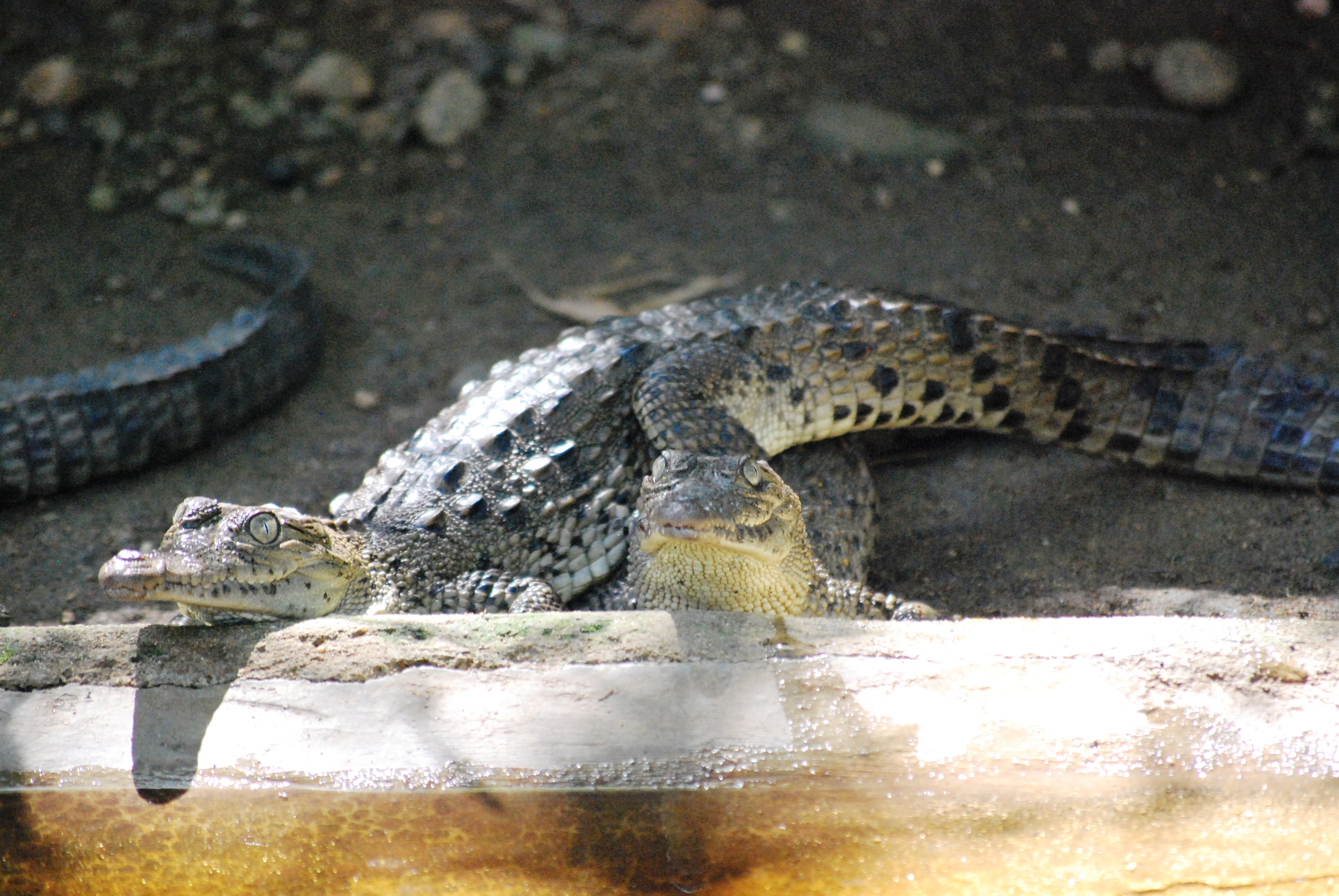
Baby crocodiles at the hatchery

Much of the ecotourism was developed here in the 1990s when groups such as Ecosolar worked in this area to help after the ban on the sea turtle and crocodile trade eliminated most people's livelihoods. This group, along with ten local families began working to offer tours in the lagoon and beach areas, inviting biologists and biology students in Mexico to study the area. This ecotourism revolves around the lagoon of the Tonameca River and the main local cooperative that conducts tours is called Servicio Ecoturisticos de La Ventanilla (La Ventanilla Ecotourism Services). This group has conducted guided tours of the lagoon since the 1990s and income from these tours supports reforestation and other ecological projects. Tours of the lagoon are available on both land and canoe to see the mangroves, and the wildlife, especially the birds, iguanas and crocodiles in their natural habitat. On Uma Island, in the lagoon, there is a greenhouse for mangrove reforestation, a nursery to hatch and raise crocodiles for release, as well as captive deer, and other animals. This group is headquartered at a palapa within the village and there is also a small restaurant on the lagoon island.

Another tour cooperative, Lagarto Real, also operates in the lagoon area. They maintain a mangrove nursery to assist with reforestation and do an excellent boat tour of the lagoon which does not visit the island. Some visitors prefer this option as they do not like to see caged animals.

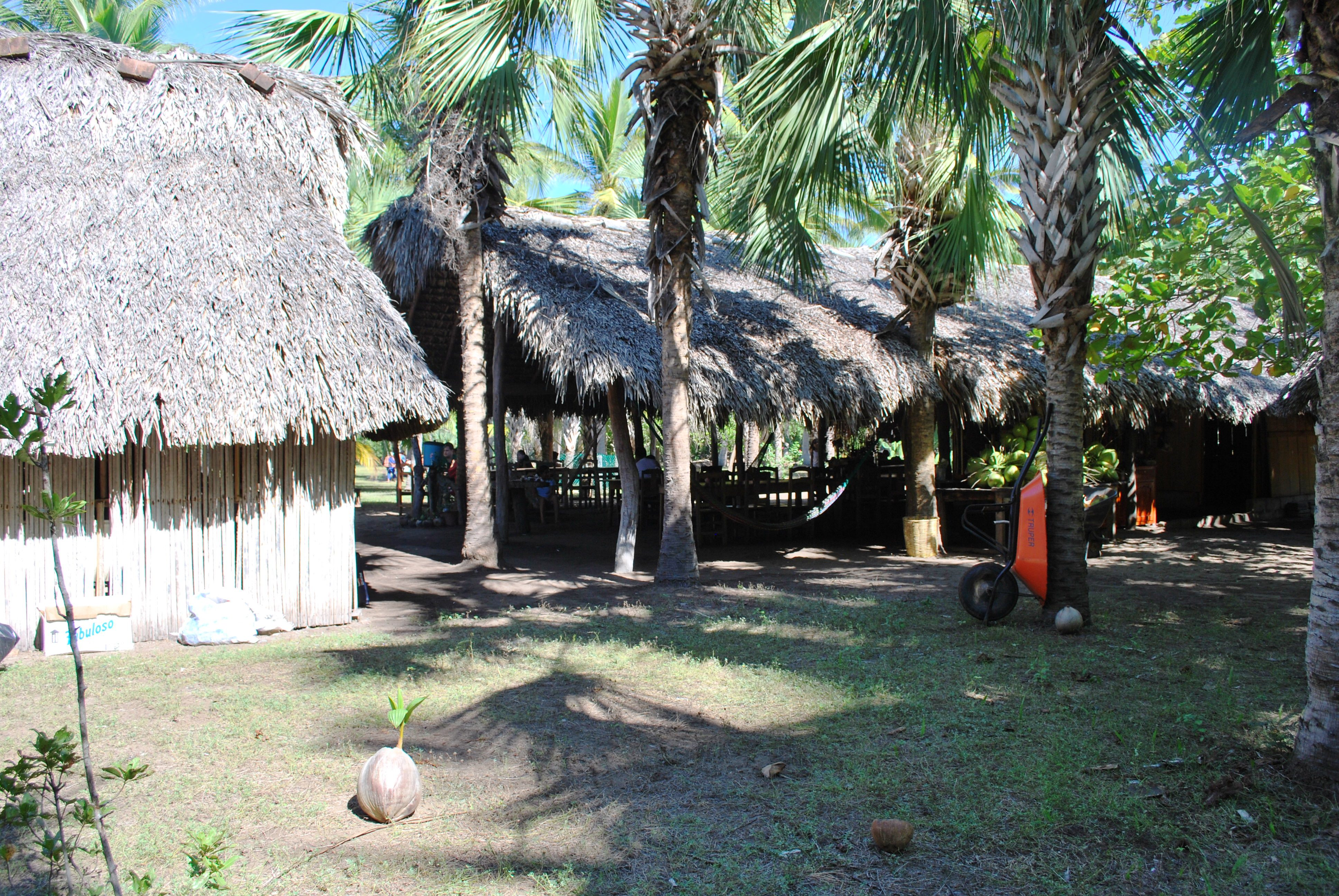
Restaurant and museum on Uma Island

Other activities that are available include horseback riding on the beach. Further west along the beach is another mangrove area, to which locals can guide for a small fee. Spending a day on the beach and even swimming in the rough surf is possible but there are no typical tourist hotels or lifeguards here.

There are camping and bathing facilities and cabins (some even with air conditioning).At night during times when the sea turtles lay their eggs, visitors can accompany volunteers as they collect eggs and can participate in the release of baby turtles.
