= Cathedral of Our Lady of Guadalupe =

Cathedral of Our Lady of Guadalupe may refer to:

== France ==
- Basse-Terre Cathedral (Cathédrale Notre-Dame-de-Guadeloupe de Basse-Terre), Guadeloupe

== Mexico ==
- Ciudad Juárez Cathedral (Catedral de Nuestra Señora de Guadalupe de Ciudad Juárez), Chihuahua
- Diocesan Sanctuary of Our Lady of Guadalupe, Zamora, Michoacán
- Huajuapan de León Cathedral (Catedral de la Virgen de Guadalupe), Oaxaca

== Puerto Rico ==
- Catedral de Nuestra Señora de Guadalupe, Ponce

== United States ==
- Cathedral of Our Lady of Guadalupe (Alaska), in Anchorage
- Cathedral of Our Lady of Guadalupe (Kansas), in Dodge City
- Cathedral Santuario de Guadalupe (Dallas, Texas)

== Uruguay ==
- Cathedral of Our Lady of Guadalupe (Canelones)

== See also ==
- Our Lady of Guadalupe Church (disambiguation)
