= Technological University of the Mixteca =

Mexican public university

- Universidad Tecnológica de la Mixteca
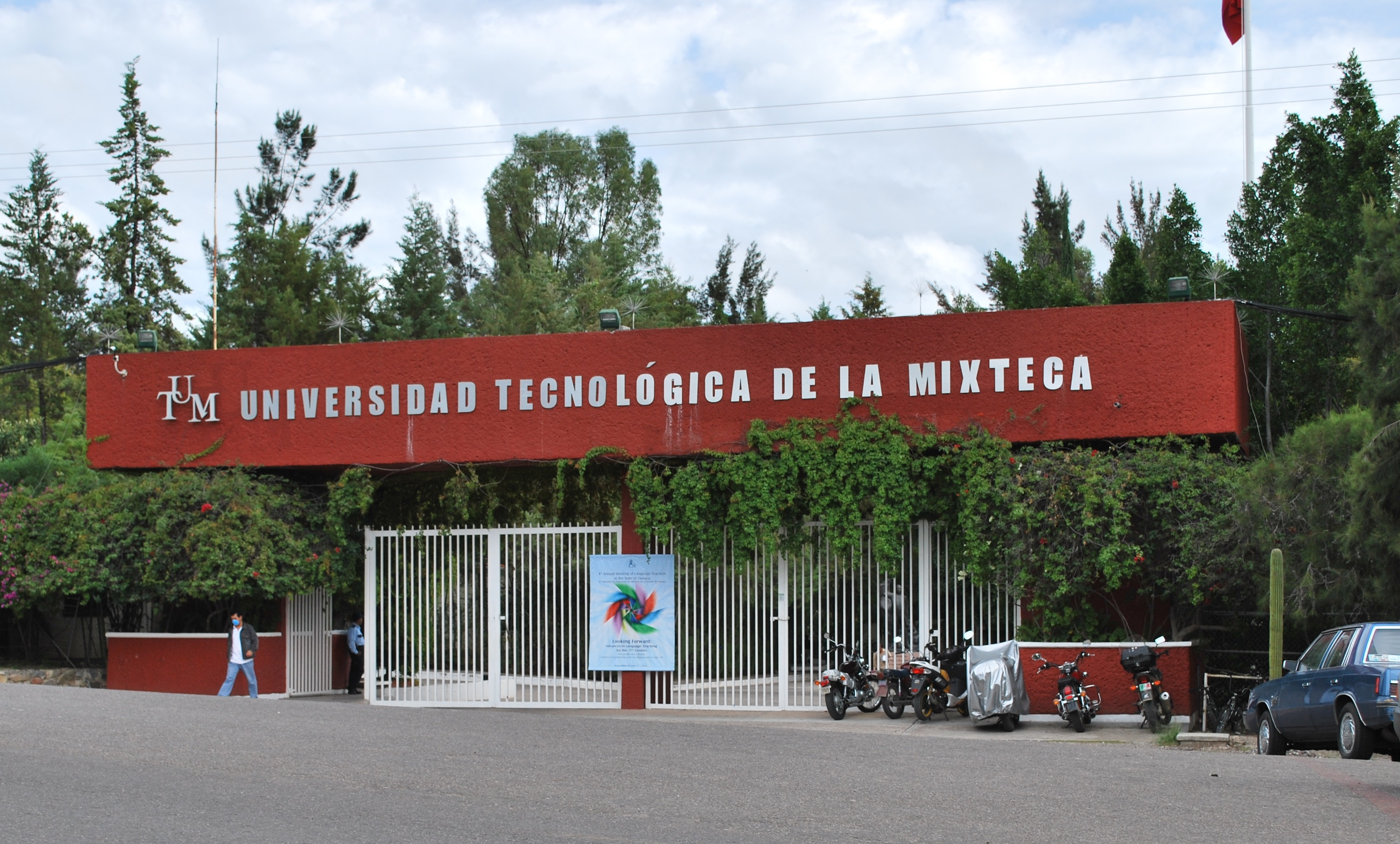
- Motto: Latin: Labor et Sapientia Libertas; Mixtec: Chun quiaa Tiaha sihi Nillao
- Motto in English: Work and Wisdom gave us Freedom
- Type: Public university
- Established: 1991
- Rector: Modesto Seara Vázquez, Ph.D.
- Location: Huajuapan de León, Oaxaca, Mexico; 17°49′36.1″N 97°48′14.65″W
- Website: www.utm.mx

The Technological University of the Mixteca (Spanish: Universidad Tecnológica de la Mixteca) (UTM), is a Mexican public university belonging to the SUNEO (Spanish: Sistema de Universidades Estatales de Oaxaca). UTM is located in Huajuapan de León, Oaxaca, region of La Mixteca, Mexico. Its main areas of focus include: teaching, research, cultural diffusion and economic development.
