= Teodoro Enrique Pino Miranda =

Mexican Catholic priest (1946–2020)

- Bishop of Huajuapan de León
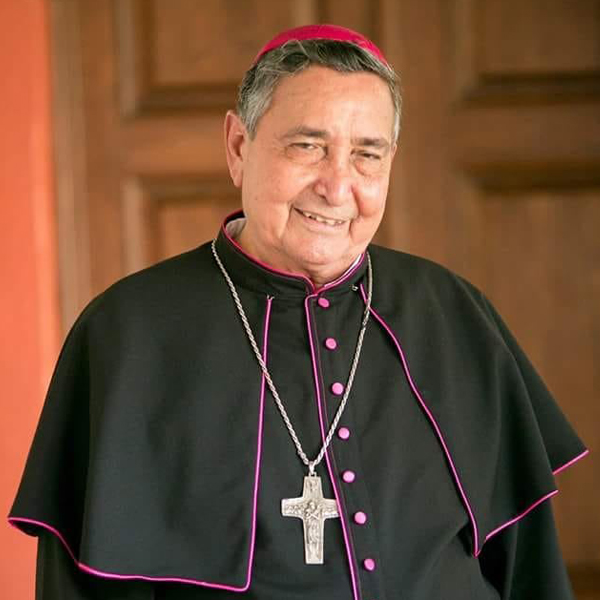
- Church: Catholic Church
- Diocese: Diocese of Huajuapan de León
- In office: 2 December 2000 – 2 July 2020
- Predecessor: Felipe Padilla Cardona
- Successor: Miguel Ángel Castro Muñoz

Orders
- Ordination: 2 April 1972
- Consecration: 31 January 2001 by José Ulises Macías Salcedo

Personal details
- Born: 1 December 1946 Cucurpe, Sonora, Mexico
- Died: 2 July 2020 (aged 73) Huajuapan de León, Oaxaca, Mexico

Teodoro Enrique Pino Miranda (1 December 1946 – 2 July 2020) was a Mexican Roman Catholic bishop.

Pino Miranda was born in Cucurpe, Mexico and was ordained to the priesthood for the Archdiocese of Hermosillo in 1972. He served as bishop of the Roman Catholic Diocese of Huajuapan de León, Mexico, from 2001 until his death in 2020.
