= Universidad del Mar =

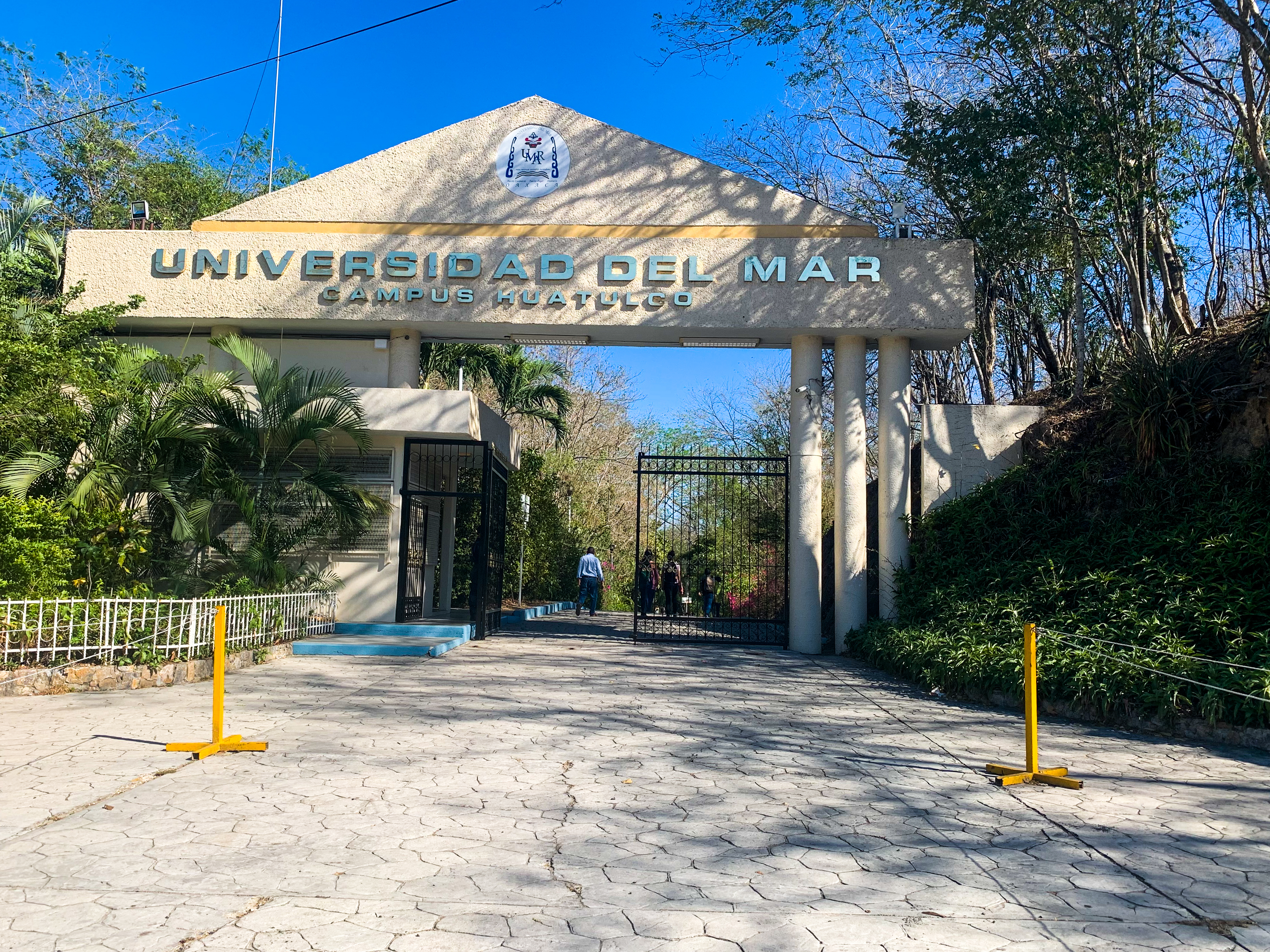
- Puerto Ángel, Puerto Escondido and Huatulco; Mexico

Information
- School type: Public
- Motto: In Latin "Mare Nostrum Veritabile Faciendum"
- Established: 1992
- Rector: Dr. Modesto Seara Vázquez
- Website: http://www.umar.mx

The Universidad del Mar «UMAR» is a public institution of higher education and scientific research of the Government of the State of Oaxaca, Mexico, with the support and recognition of the federal government. It belongs to the Oaxaca State University System (OSUS) and has three campuses, Puerto Angel, Puerto Escondido, and Huatulco, and a Center of Tourist Training (CECAT). Its main functions are teaching, research, cultural diffusion and promoting development.

UMAR was founded in 1992 at the request of Oaxaca Governor Heladio Ramírez López. It was designed and executed by Modesto Seara Vázquez, rector of the university.

The Universidad del Mar has positioned itself as one of the best universities in Mexico, as demonstrated by results achieved in the last 13 years, when the bachelor's degrees in tourism administration and international relations have obtained first place in the CENEVAL knowledge test.

== Objectives of this university model ==
To decentralize higher education;

To avoid the concentration of academic and scientific resources in areas that are becoming disproportionately strong and increasingly differentiated from the rest of the country;

To prevent the human decapitalization of the most disadvantaged regions, which due to the lack of educational opportunities see young generations leave at an early age that facilitates their permanent uprooting, due to the emotional and sentimental ties and interests that are produced in the place of residence, and which makes their recovery practically impossible;

To improve knowledge of the economic resources of the concerned region in order to lay the foundation for sound economic and social development;

To train social leaders in the public and private spheres;

To introduce a professional elite into a society that lacks one, to serve as a catalyst for transformation;

To improve the cultural competitiveness of the area of influence of the respective university, by combining the reception of ideas and modernizing concepts, with the conservation and reinforcement of the own values; and

To contribute in a globalized world to the competitiveness of the economy of Oaxaca and Mexico, seeking the highest standards of quality in teaching and research, without an inferiority complex.

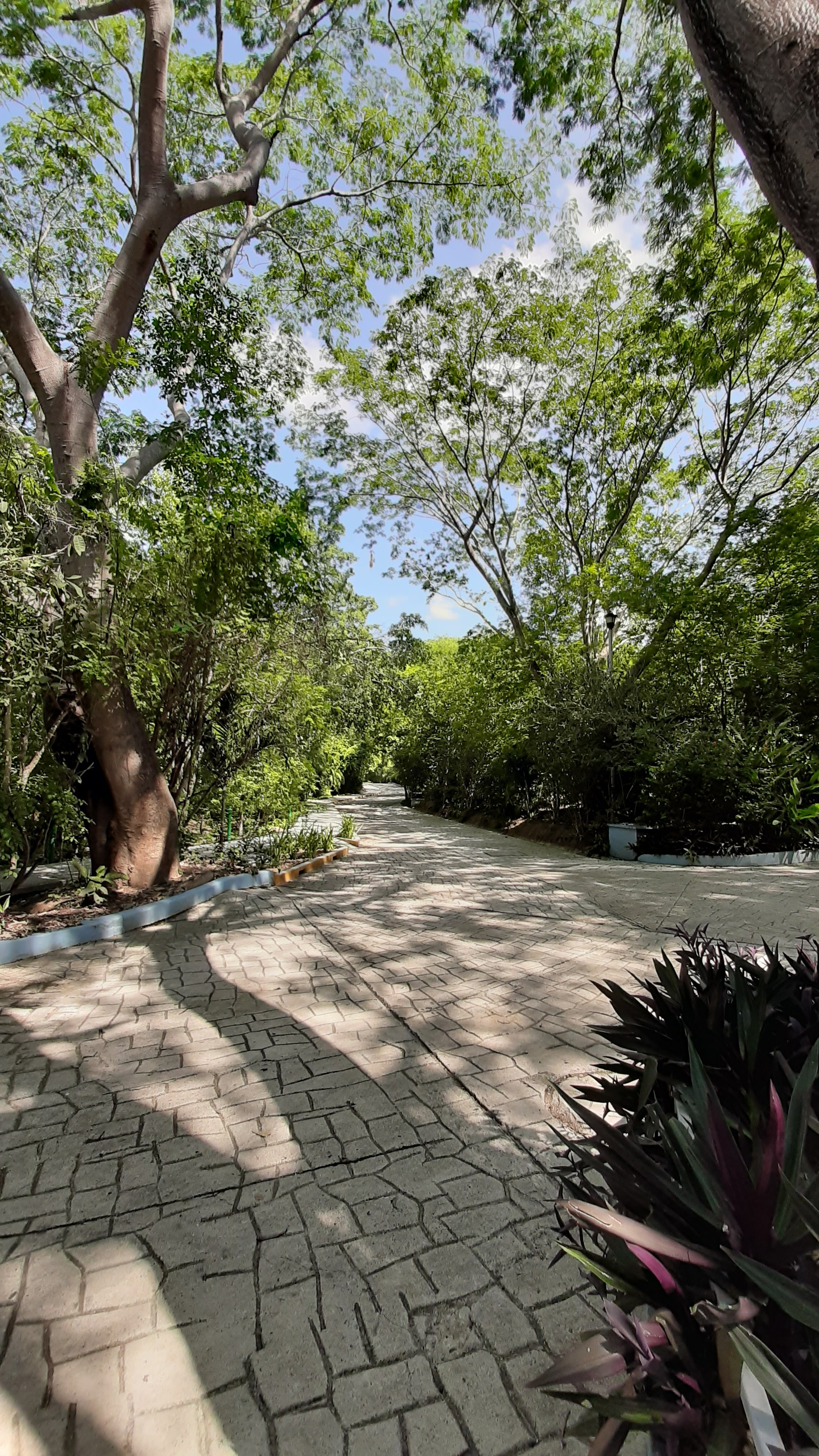
Walkways at UMAR, Huatulco Campus

== Motto ==
The motto Mare Nostrum Veritabile Faciendum means "Let us truly make the sea ours".

== Governing bodies ==
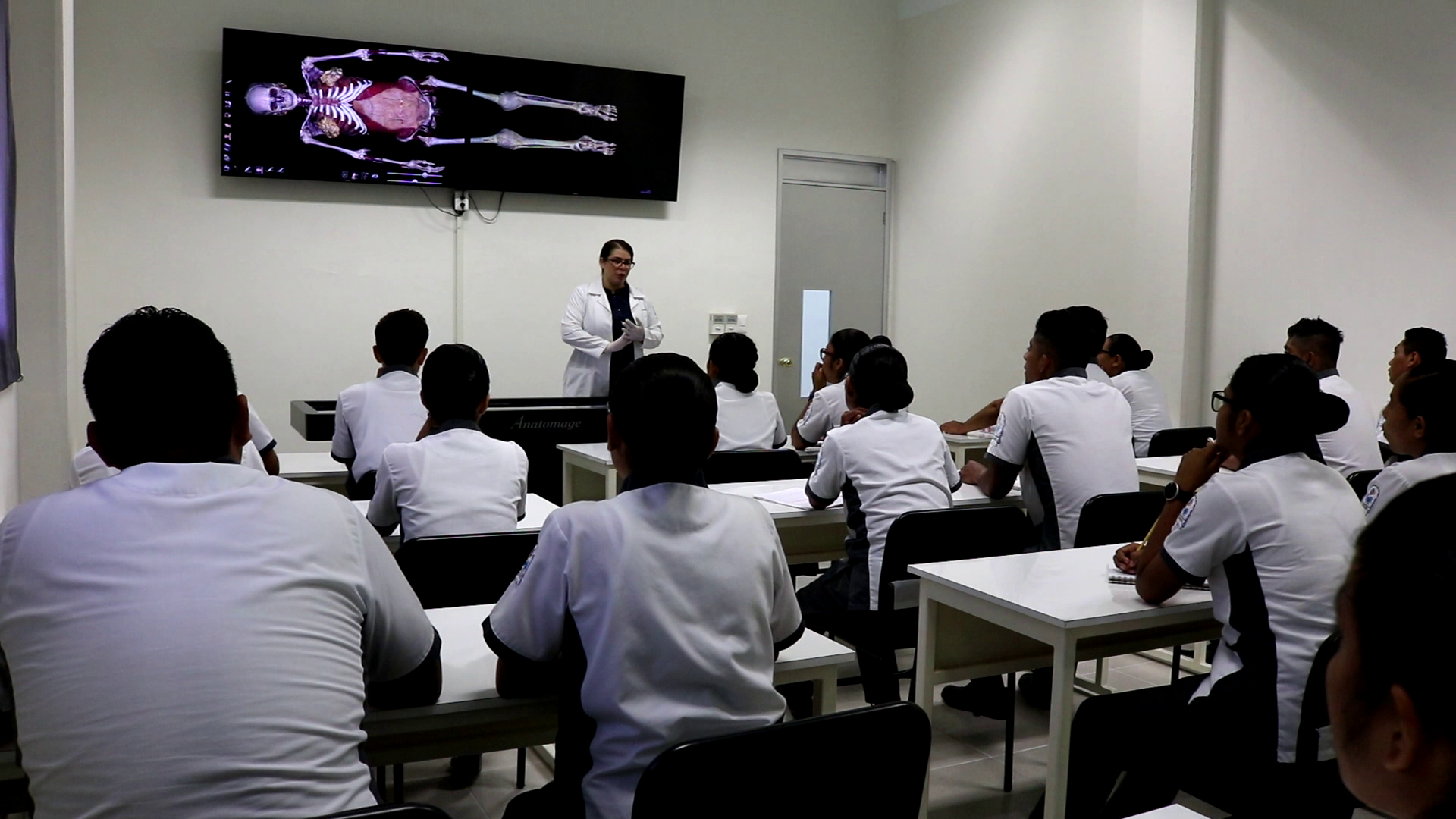
- Anatomy Room at UMAR, Puerto Escondido Campus.
  Rector, who is the highest university authority, and is appointed or removed by the Governor of Oaxaca.
- Academic vice-rector and administrative vice-rector, appointed by the rector.
- Vice-rector for Relations and Resources, also appointed by the rector. They have only been appointed for the Universidad Tecnológica de la Mixteca and Universidad del Mar, which are respectively in charge of the SUNEO offices in Mexico City and Oaxaca.
- Head of department and directors of research institutes, as well as the heads of the postgraduate studies. They are appointed by the rector.

== Academics ==
UMAR offers 16 undergraduate programs in addition to 11 postgraduate studies.

Bachelor's degrees

1. Actuarial Studies - Huatulco campus
2. Animal Science - Puerto Escondido Campus
3. Aquaculture Engineering - Puerto Ángel Campus
4. Biology - Puerto Escondido Campus
5. Communication Sciences - Huatulco Campus
6. Economics - Huatulco Campus
7. Environmental Engineering - Puerto Ángel Campus
8. Fishing Engineering- Puerto Ángel Campus
9. Forestry Engineering - Puerto Escondido Campus
10. Informatics – Puerto Escondido Campus
11. International Relations - Huatulco Campus
12. Marine Biology - Puerto Ángel Campus
13. Maritime Sciences - Puerto Ángel Campus
14. Nursing - Puerto Escondido Campus
15. Oceanology - Puerto Ángel Campus
16. Tourism Administration - Huatulco Campus

Postgraduate Studies

Masters

1. Animal Production and Health - Puerto Escondido Campus
2. Environmental Sciences - Puerto Ángel Campus
3. International Criminal Law - Huatulco Campus
4. International Relations: Environment - Huatulco Campus
5. Science: Genetics of Biodiversity - Puerto Escondido Campus
6. Science: Marine Ecology - Puerto Ángel Campus
7. Science: Wildlife Management - Puerto Escondido Campus
8. Tourism Marketing - Huatulco Campus

Doctorates

1. Animal Production - Puerto Escondido Campus
2. Environmental Sciences - Puerto Escondido Campus
3. Marine Ecology - Puerto Ángel Campus

== Infrastructure ==
UMAR has forty laboratories, for example:

- Aquaculture - Puerto Ángel Campus
- Phycotoxin Analysis (Larvatron) - Puerto Ángel Campus
- Food Analysis and Technology - Puerto Ángel Campus
- Mass Calculation - Puerto Ángel Campus
- Biological Collections - Puerto Escondido Campus
- Coastal Dynamics - Puerto Ángel Campus
- Teaching Biological Oceanography - Puerto Ángel Campus
- Teaching Physical Oceanography - Puerto Ángel Campus
- Teaching Geological Oceanography - Puerto Ángel Campus
- Ecology of the Bentos - Puerto Ángel Campus
- Histology - Puerto Ángel Campus
- Ichthyology and Fisheries Biology - Puerto Ángel Campus
- Environmental Engineering - Puerto Ángel Campus
- Research in Chemistry and Biology - Puerto Ángel Campus
- Genetic Research - Puerto Ángel Campus
- Microbiology - Puerto Escondido Campus
- Chemical Oceanography - Puerto Ángel Campus
- Geographic Information Systems and Remote Sensing - Puerto Ángel Campus
- Systematic of Marine Invertebrates -Campus Puerto Ángel
- Microalgae Technology -Campus Puerto Ángel

== Research ==
UMAR has 9 Research Institutes

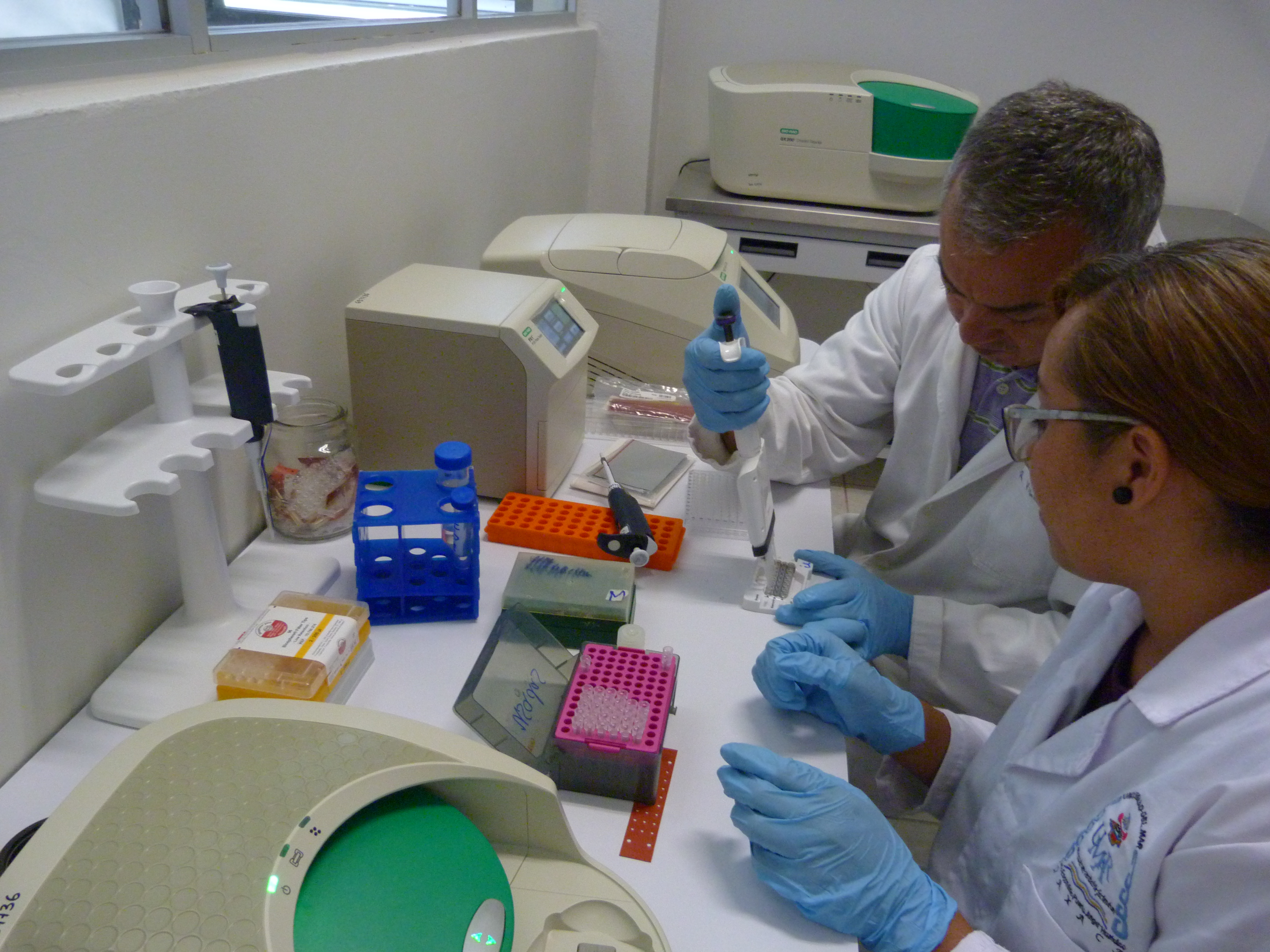
1. Droplet Digital PCR System, QX200, BIORAT at the Laboratory of Genetics at Universidad del Mar, Puerto Escondido Campus.
  Communication Sciences - Huatulco Campus
2. Social Sciences and Humanities - Puerto Ángel Campus
3. Ecology -Campus Puerto Escondido and Puerto Ángel Campus
4. Economic Studies - Huatulco Campus
5. International Studies Isidro Fabela - Huatulco Campus
6. Genetics -Campus Puerto Escondido and Puerto Ángel Campus
7. Industries -Campus Puerto Escondido and Puerto Ángel Campus
8. Resources -Campus Puerto Escondido and Puerto Ángel Campus
9. Tourism - Huatulco Campus

== Publications ==
Books

The Decisive Hour. Seara Vázquez, Modesto. 2018. 330pp.

Corporaciones Multinacionales. Una mirada a Oaxaca. Lozano Vázquez, Alberto, Marco Antonio Guadarrama Vega, Saúl Mendoza Palacios, Carlos Gabriel Argüelles Arredondo (Coord.). 2017. 330 pp.

La Vuelta al Mundo en 80 años. Seara Vázquez, Modesto. 2016. 433pp.

Los puertos de España y México. González Laxe, Fernando and Ojeda Cárdenas, Juan N. (Coord.). 2013. 318pp.

Después de la Tragedia. A 70 años de la Segunda Guerra Mundial. Seara Vázquez, Modesto and Lozano Vázquez, Alberto (Coord.). 2015. 806pp.

DDT Mitos y Realidades. Hernández Carlo, Beatriz and Martha E. Alcántara Garduño. 2012. 230pp.

Aves del Jardín Botánico. Bojorges B. José C. 2012. 92pp.

La Sociedad Internacional Amorfa. Soluciones inadecuadas para problemas complejos. Seara Vázquez, Modesto (coord.). 2011. 654pp.

La iguana negra. Fundamentos de reproducción, nutrición y su manejo en cautiverio. Arcos García, José Luis and Roberto López Pozos. 2009. 164pp.

Diagnóstico de los Recursos Naturales de la Bahía y Micro-cuenca de Cacaluta. Domínguez Licona, Juan Manuel (Ed.). 2008. 453pp.

Rusia hacia la Cuenca del Pacífico. 2007. Roldán, Eduardo (Ed.). 355pp.

La política exterior de México durante la Segunda Guerra Mundial. Velázquez Flores, Rafael. 2007. 205pp.

Atlas de corales pétreos (Anthozoa: Scleractinia) del Pacífico mexicano. Reyes Bonilla, Héctor, et al. 2005. 124pp.

Factores, bases y fundamentos de la política exterior de México. Velázquez Flores, Rafael. 2005. 332pp.

Estudio de Ordenamiento Ecológico para la Zona Costera del Istmo de Tehuantepec. Serrano Guzmán, Saúl J. (coord.). 2004. 159pp.

Mujeres Empresarias y Turismo en la Costa Oaxaqueña. Informe Diagnóstico y Directorio. Fernández Aldecua, María José and Pascal Barradas Salas. 2001. 81pp.

Biología y aprovechamiento del camarón Duende Streptocephalus (Crustacea-branchiopoda). Castrejón Ocampo, Laura. 1993. 72pp.

Diagramas prácticos para la acuicultura. Porras Díaz, Demetrio and Laura Castrejón Ocampo. Cuadernos 1. 1993. 111pp.

Mezcal. Moctezuma, Isidro. 2018. 113pp.

Journal

Ciencia y Mar. Published quarterly since 1997
