= Diocese of Huajuapan de León =

Latin Catholic jurisdiction in Mexico

Coordinates: 17.8072°N 97.7755°W

Diocese of Huajuapan de León Dioecesis Huaiuapanensis Diócesis de Huajuapan de León
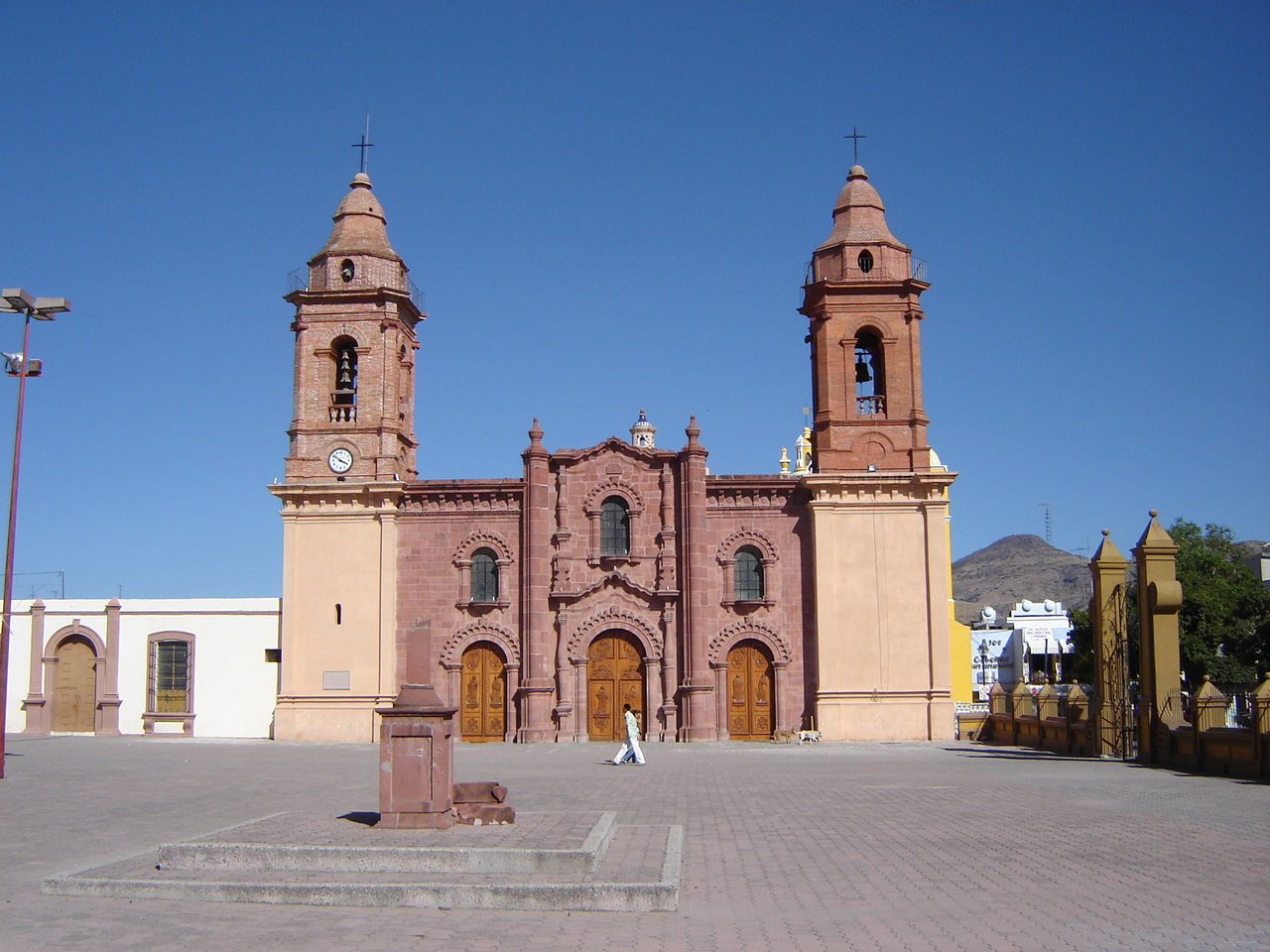
- Catedral de la Virgen de Guadalupe

Location
- Country: Mexico
- Ecclesiastical province: Puebla de los Ángeles

Statistics
- Area: 10,042 sq mi (26,010 km^{2})
- Population: Total; Catholics: (as of 2006); 760,000; 720.000 (94.7%)
- Parishes: 71

Information
- Denomination: Catholic Church
- Sui iuris church: Latin Church
- Rite: Roman Rite
- Established: 25 April 1902 (123 years ago)
- Cathedral: Cathedral of the Virgin of Guadalupe

Current leadership
- Pope: Leo XIV
- Bishop: Miguel Ángel Castro Muñoz
- Metropolitan Archbishop: Victor Sánchez Espinosa

Map
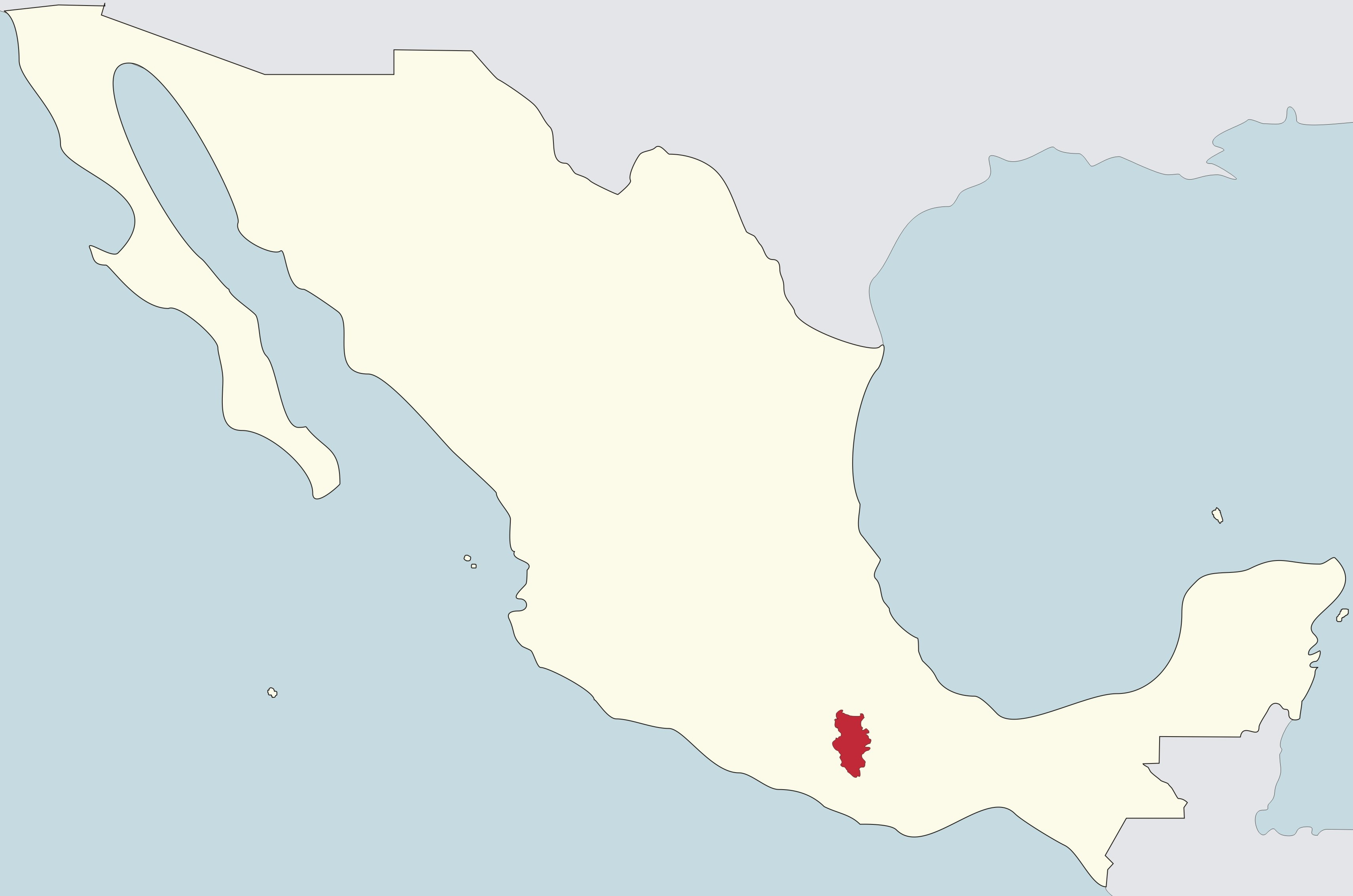

Website
- arquidiocesisdepuebla.mx

The Diocese of Huajuapan de León (Latin: Dioecesis Huaiuapanensis) is a Latin Church ecclesiastical territory or diocese of the Catholic Church in Mexico. The diocese is a suffragan in the ecclesiastical province of the metropolitan Archdiocese of Puebla de los Ángeles. It was erected on 25 April 1902 as the "Diocese of Mixtecas" and renamed on 13 November 1903. It cathedra is found within the Catedral de la Virgen de Guadalupe in the episcopal see of Huajuapan de León, Oaxaca.

== Bishops ==
=== Ordinaries ===
- Rafael Amador y Hernández (1903 -1923)
- Luis María Altamirano y Bulnes (1923 -1933), appointed Bishop of Tulancingo, Hidalgo
- Jenaro Méndez del Río (1933 -1952)
- Celestino Fernández y Fernández (1952 -1967)
- José López Lara (1967 -1981), appointed Bishop of San Juan de los Lagos, Jalisco
- José de Jesús Aguilera Rodriguez (1982 -1991)
- Felipe Padilla Cardona (1992 -1996), appointed Coadjutor Bishop of Tehuantepec, Oaxaca
- Teodoro Enrique Pino Miranda (2000 - 2020)
- Miguel Ángel Castro Muñoz (2021 - )

=== Auxiliary bishop ===
- Celestino Fernández y Fernández (1948-1952), appointed bishop here

== External links and references ==
- "Diocese of Huajuapan de León". Catholic-Hierarchy.
