= Our Lady of Guadalupe Church =

Our Lady of Guadalupe Church may refer to:

== United States ==
- Our Lady of Guadalupe Church (Flagstaff, Arizona)
- Our Lady of Guadalupe Church (San Francisco), California)
- Our Lady of Guadalupe Church (Conejos, Colorado) (or Antonito, Colorado), listed on the National Register of Historic Places (NRHP) in Conejos County
- Our Lady of Guadalupe Church (Denver, Colorado), a Denver Landmark
- Our Lady of Guadalupe Church & International Shrine of St. Jude, New Orleans, Louisiana
- Our Lady of Guadalupe Parish (Taos, New Mexico)
- Church of Our Lady of Guadalupe (Manhattan), New York
- Our Lady of Guadalupe Catholic Church (Houston), Texas

== Elsewhere ==
- Church of Our Lady of Guadalupe (Puerto Vallarta), Jalisco, Mexico
- Catedral de Nuestra Señora de Guadalupe, Ponce, Puerto Rico, NRHP-listed

== See also ==
- Cathedral of Our Lady of Guadalupe (disambiguation)
