= Huajuapan de León Cathedral =

Coordinates: 17.8072°N 97.7753°W

Our Lady of Guadalupe Cathedral
- Catedral de la Virgen de Guadalupe
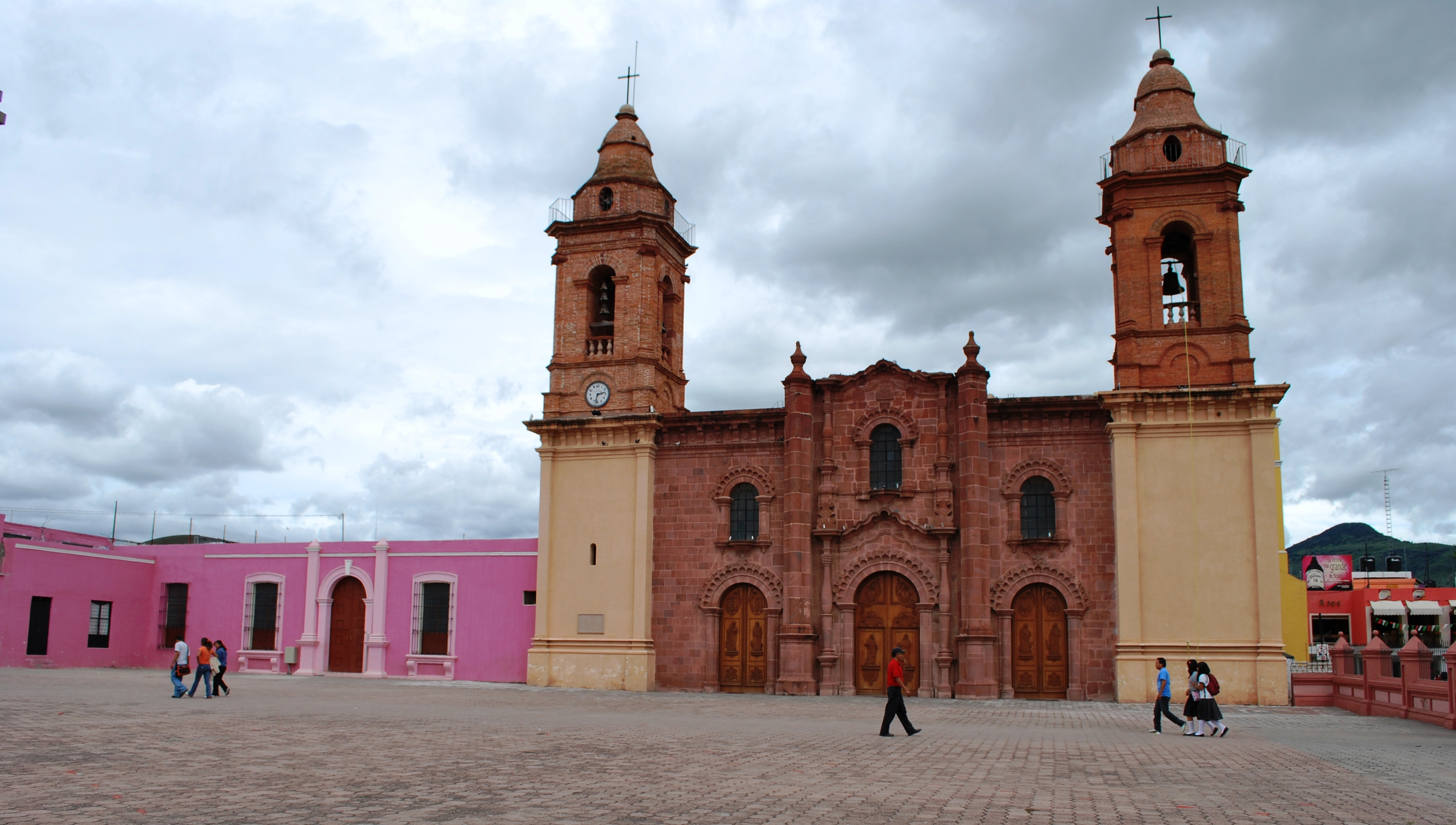
- Our Lady of Guadalupe Cathedral
- Location: Huajuapan de León
- Country: Mexico
- Denomination: Roman Catholic Church

The Our Lady of Guadalupe Cathedral (also Huajuapan de León Cathedral; Spanish: Catedral de la Virgen de Guadalupe) is a Catholic church that serves as the headquarters of the Diocese of Huajuapan de León in Mexico since 1903. The building is located in the center of the city of Huajuapan de León, in the state of Oaxaca.

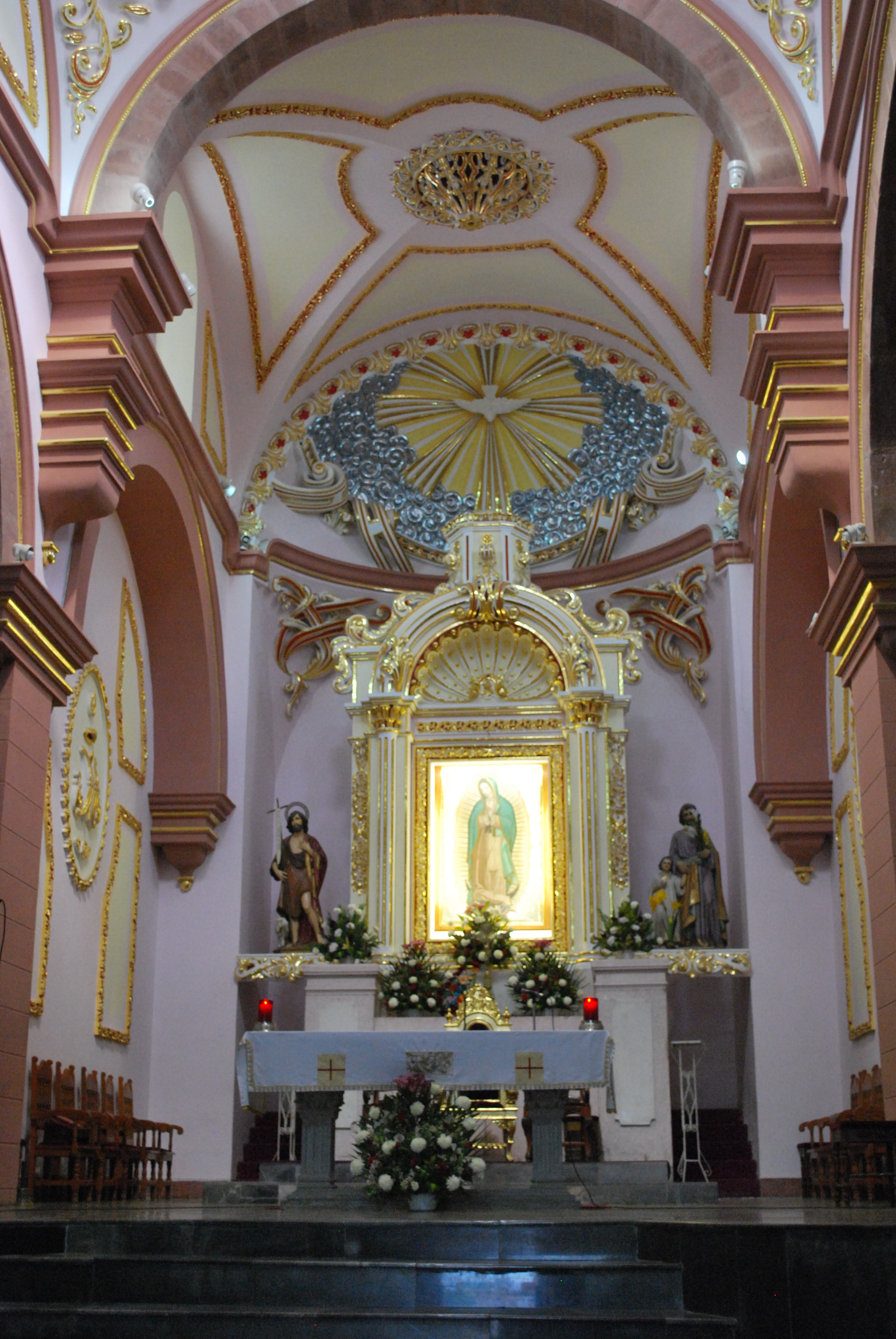
Internal view

It is dedicated to the Virgin of Guadalupe. The church was built at the end of the 17th century and various extensions and modifications were made throughout the 19th century. It is decorated almost entirely in Neoclassical style.

The Diocese of Huajuapan de León was founded on 25 April 1902 by the papal bull Apostolica Sedes signed by Pope Leo XIII.

== See also ==
- Roman Catholicism in Mexico
