= Ciudad Juárez Cathedral =

Coordinates: 31.738577°N 106.486789°W

Our Lady of Guadalupe Cathedral
- Catedral de Nuestra Señora de Guadalupe de Ciudad Juárez
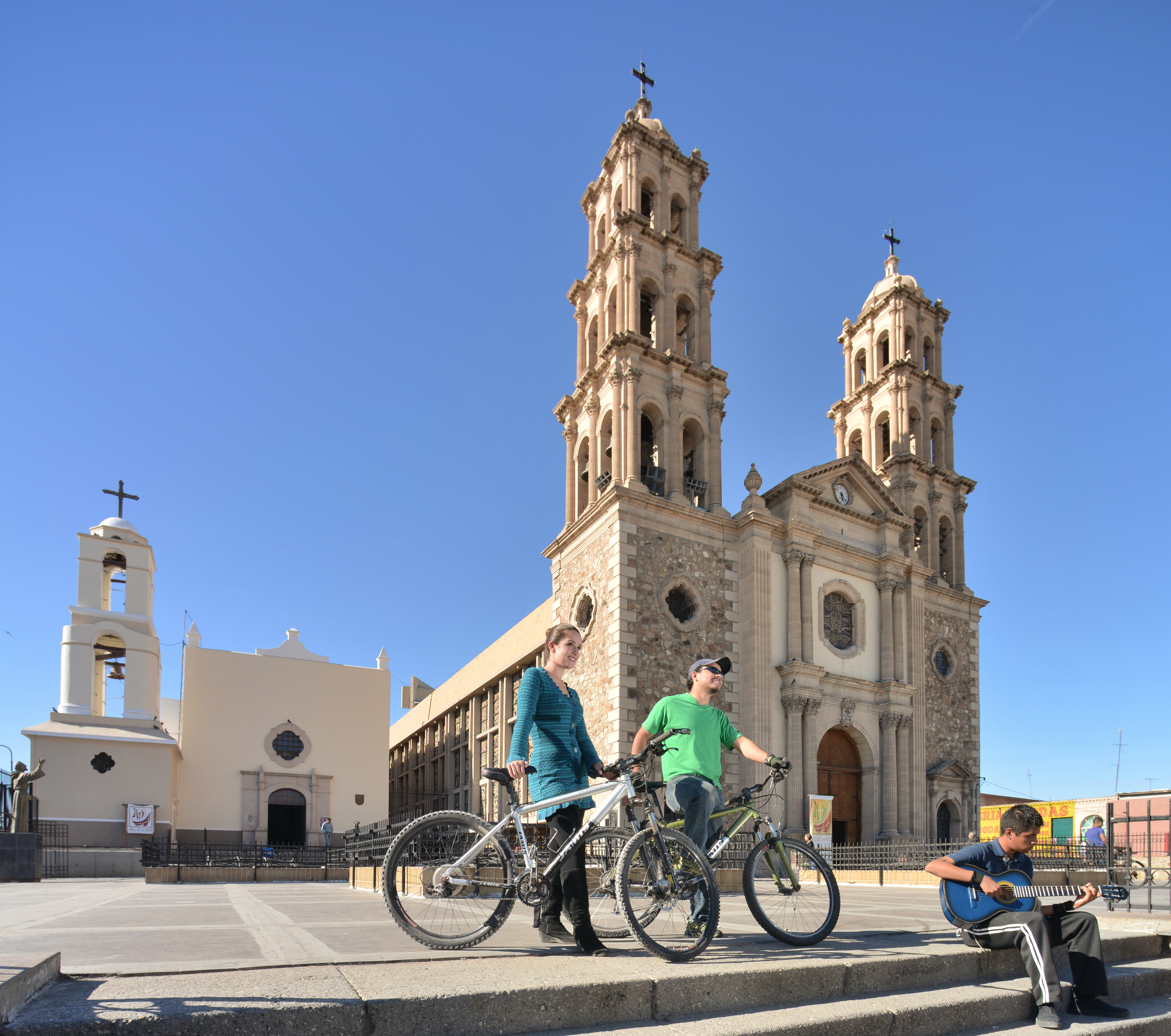
- Our Lady of Guadalupe Cathedral
- Location: Ciudad Juárez
- Country: Mexico
- Denomination: Roman Catholic Church

The Our Lady of Guadalupe Cathedral (Spanish: Catedral de Nuestra Señora de Guadalupe de Ciudad Juárez), also Ciudad Juárez Cathedral, is a Catholic cathedral church dedicated to the Virgin of Guadalupe that is located in Ciudad Juárez in the border state of Chihuahua, in Mexico, in the area called Historical Center. It was built in the middle of the second half of the twentieth century and is attached to the old and still preserved Franciscan mission, founded in the 17th century, in the then Paso del Norte.

The first church of the area, still preserved, was erected by the order of the Franciscans who began to Christianize the natives. On December 8, 1659, Fray García de San Francisco founded the Guadalupe de los Mansos Mission in the Paso del Norte river. The place took on importance as the capital of the province of New Mexico from 1681 to 1693 after the Pueblo Indian uprising of 1680.

With the growth of the city in the twentieth century, at the initiative of Father Baudelio Pelayo the new cathedral was built attached to the old church. This was consecrated in the year 1941.

Completed the construction in the year of 1957, was designated the Diocese of Ciudad Juárez.

== See also ==
- Roman Catholicism in Mexico
- Our Lady of Guadalupe
