= Modesto Seara Vázquez =

Spanish jurist and academic (1931–2022)

Modesto Seara-Vazquez
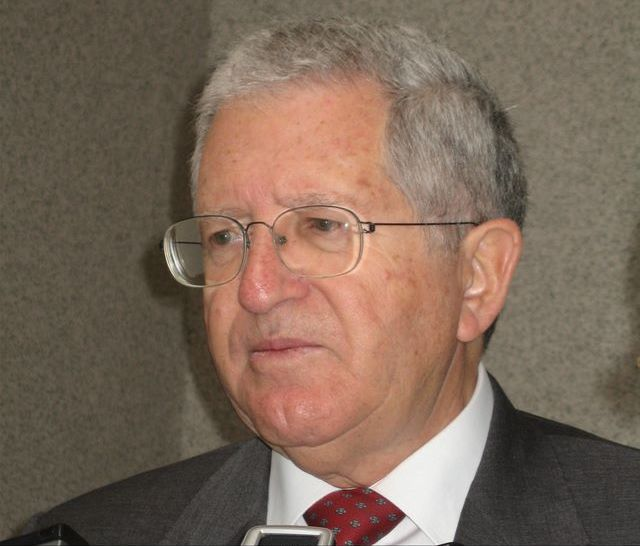

Rector Oaxaca State University System

Personal details
- Born: 11 September 1931; Allariz, Spain
- Died: 26 December 2022 (aged 91); Mexico City, Mexico
- Education: Doctorate in international law
- Alma mater: Universidad Central de Madrid (now Universidad Complutense de Madrid); Université de Paris (Sorbone)
- Profession: Professor of international law and international relations

Modesto Seara Vázquez (11 September 1931 – 26 December 2022) was a Spanish-born Mexican jurist and academic. He lived in several countries (Spain, England, France, Germany) but has spent most of his life in Mexico. He has actively participated in Mexican life as a professor at the National Autonomous University of Mexico and since 1988 as the Rector of the Oaxaca State University System in the State of Oaxaca. He died in Mexico City on 26 December 2022, at the age of 91.

== Early years ==
Modesto Seara Vazquez experienced the political persecution to which his father was subjected by the Franco regime, a situation which was surely decisive in defining his political vocation and position for international issues, because the surveillance of his home in the run-up to the Second World War left him marked with that passion forever.

In 1950 he went to Madrid to prepare for his Aeronautical Engineering degree. Shortly afterwards he discovered his true vocation, which was the study of international issues, and he moved on to the law degree. He studied at the Faculty of Law of the Central University of Madrid (today Complutense University), being among the last generation to study at Calle de San Bernardo, before the faculty was transferred to the University City.

== Education ==
- Doctorate in International Law. University of Paris "The Sobornne", 1959
- B.A. Central University, today Complutence University of Madrid, 1955
- Diploma in Sociology "Methods of Study of Social Attitudes", Jaime Balmes Institute of the CSIC, Spain, 1955
- Diploma of Higher International Studies, Spanish Association of International Colonial Studies, Madrid 1955

His doctoral thesis, entitled "Études de Droit Interplanetaire", provoked a lot of interest and Le Figaro Literaire dedicated a long report written by Beatrix Beck, Goncourt Literature Prize, to support the thesis. Radio Paris also broadcast a series of interviews with Modesto Seara Vazquez entitled "The Interplanetary Law Seen from Paris". As a result, he was invited to present a paper at the Congress of the International Astronautical Federation (London 1959) in which he enunciated his theory of the functional regulation of space, later published in Vienna (1960), and which would be assumed by the majority of jurists.

== Academic activities ==
=== Mexico ===
On 1 March 1961 he began his collaboration with the National Autonomous University of Mexico, as a full-time research professor at the Institute of Comparative Law, now the Institute of Legal Research. At the same time he began to collaborate with the Faculty of Law and the School of Political and Social Sciences (now the Faculty of Social and Political Sciences) holding the chairs of Public International Law and International Organization.

In 1961 he published his first book Introduction to International Cosmic Law, a revised and updated edition of his doctoral thesis, that years later was translated into English. In 1963, part of the thesis was also published in Russian, in Moscow.

In Paris, Modesto Seara Vazquez met a great figure of Mexican life, Isidro Fabela, who was introduced to him by the military advisor of the Mexican Embassy, General Alberto Salinas Carranza, one of the founders of Mexican aviation. Isidro Fabela was traveling to Europe with his wife Doña Josefina. The advanced age of both made them fear to travel alone so they decided to bring with them Modesto Seara Vazquez. Isidro Fabela's friendship was decisive in the life of Modesto Seara Vazquez, since it opened many doors and integrated him quickly into the life of the country.

In that first decade of the 1960, Modesto Seara Vazquez had a very active academic life at National Autonomous University of Mexico, where he published a book on outer space law Cosmic International Law and a text on Public International Law, which would expand to 25 editions by 2016. All the editions of his books are subject to an update by him before he authorizes its publication.

=== United States ===
From 1965 to 1966 he was Professor at the University of Utah, Salt Lake City, in an extremely enriching stay, where he lived with the essentially Mormon community of the State of Utah, one of the last theocracies in the Western world. In spite of his political ideas, different from those prevailing in that environment, he always had the respect of his hosts. While having different vacation periods, he got to know the whole western part of the United States and traveled frequently through the states of Utah, California, Arizona, Nevada, Idaho, Montana, Oregon and Washington. He also visited British Columbia, in Canada, where he stayed briefly in Vancouver.

=== Jewish Rights in the Soviet Union ===
Modesto Seara Vazquez joined an international movement in favor of the Jews of the Soviet Union, as part of the Latin American Committee, defending the right to leave. For more than two decades, he participated in many countries in different activities like lectures, seminars, conferences, etc. In October 1973, during the Yon Kippur war, he visited the USSR as part of a commission of four people that were sent to meet Jews who were denied an exit visa. That Commission visited Moscow, Kiev, Tbilisi and Leningrad.

=== Europe ===
In 1969 Modesto Seara Vazquez decided to spend his sabbatical year in Europe, half of it in Spain and the other part in Berlin (West) where he carried out research on Franco's foreign policy, using the bibliographic and periodical collections of the Ibero-Amerikanisches Institut, in Berlin. During this period he also gave lectures in East Germany at the Karl Marx Universität, from Leipzig and Universität Rostock.

== The journalistic dimension: press and television ==
In the 70's he combined his academic activities with an intense participation in the Press and the Media. In El Sol de México he wrote editorial comments and several special articles, also on sundays he wrote the Sunday supplement in El Mundo desde el Sol which was a weekly commentary about the international life with a little bit of humor. He was appointed general advisor of Canal 13 (public television) where he also wrote weekly comments about the international life in the Séptimo día program. Apart from that he created a series of international reports named Paz y Conflicto which programs were The Impossible Peace (on the Middle East), April in Portugal (the carnation Revolution, in Lisbon, Portugal), They Will Not Kill Hope (about Chilean political life and the death of Salvador Allende), the New Empire (about the last years of the Iran of Shah Reza Pahleví), and so on.

== Oaxaca State Universities ==
=== Theoretical phase ===
In 1983, Modesto Seara Vazquez decided to abandon politics and return to university life, working at the National Autonomous University of Mexico. They were several years of an intense academic activity, both national and international where he increased his publications publishing new books and new editions, as well as essays. He runs the Mexican Yearbook of International Relations that he founded in 1980. In 1967 he created the Mexican Institute of Internacional Relations that years later was changed to The Mexican Association of International Studies.

In 1989 he was elected vice president of the International Studies Association (ISA). At the ISA-MAIE meeting held in Acapulco, Guerrero, he concluded his term as president of MAEI and he was elected honorary president of the association.

In 1989 he was named National Researcher Emeritus, of the National System of Researchers of CONACYT.

=== Practical phase ===
1988 was a decisive year of Modesto Seara Vazquez's life. In that year the governor of the state of Oaxaca asked him to create a project to build a university in Huajuapan de León, in the Mixtec region, in the north of the state. Modesto Seara Vazquez developed the project and it officially began a new model of universities, that are conceived as universities for development. The definition he gave to this model of university was in the sense of transcending its educational function, and understanding it as a cultural instrument to transform society. He gave it four main functions: teaching, research, dissemination of culture and promotion of development.

The Technological University of the Mixteca opened its doors in 1990, with 48 students, five professors and two classrooms, in the middle of a land baptized by local humorists as "the Seara Desert". It was the beginning of a great adventure that led to an unprecedented academic university project. In 2019, The Technological University of the Mixteca has around 220 full-time research professors and about 1,800 students. It offers 12 bachelor and engineering degrees, 15 Masters Degree programs, five PhD Degree programs, and it has nine research Institutes, within 109-hectare campus with more than 100 buildings.

As a result, the students of the Technological University of the Mixteca routinely rank among the top nationally (according to CENEVAL's General Knowledge Exams), in the fields of computer engineering, electronics, industrial or business sciences. In 2008 and 2011, a group of students achieved first place in the world in HCI (Human Computar Interaction, ACM), in the finals that took place in Florence and Atlanta and they were also number two in the same competition (Human Computar Interaction, ACM), first time in San Jose, California in 2017 and the second time in Paris, in 2013.

== Academic institutions ==
- President of the Mexican Association of International Studies, from 1967 to 1968 and from 1982 to 1993. Honorary president since 1993
- Vice president of the International Studies Association, (ISA), from 1989 to 1991
- Member of the Ad Hoc Committee on the International Geosphere/Biosphere Program (ISA), participating with Oran Young (U. Vermont), Harold Jacobsen (U. Michigan), Mihaly Simai (Magyar Ensz Tarsasag) and Denis Pirages (U. Maryland), 1986
- Visiting professor at the University of Utah, Salt Lake City, from 1965 to 1966
- Founding Head of the División de Estudios de Posgrado at the National Autonomous University of Mexico, from 1967 to 1960
- Founding Head of the Center for International Relations at the National Autonomous University of Mexico, from 1970 to 1973
- Full Professor at El Colegio de México, 1967
- Full Professor of at the Law Faculty of the National Autonomous University of Mexico, from 1961 to 1967
- Founding Head of the Mexican Yearbook of International Relations, from 1980 to 1987
- Full Professor of the Faculty of Political and Social Sciences at the National Autonomous University of Mexico, from 1961 to 2012
- Member of the Specialized Group for Special Activities at the National Autonomous University of Mexico, 1987
- Steering Committee Member of the Academic Council on the United Nations System (ACUNS), 1989
- Member of the Mexican National Committee for the Fiftieth Anniversary of the United Nations, 1995

== Books ==
- Around the World in 80 Years. Volumen I 1931-1976. First English Edition. Seara Vázquez, Modesto. Huatulco:UMAR, June 2020, pp. 430
- The Decisive Hour. English translation of the Spanish 3rd Edition (1995). Universidad del Mar, Huatulco, Mexico pp. 330
- Un Nuevo Modelo de Universidad. Universidades para el Desarrollo. 3rd Edition. Universidad Tecnológica de la Mixteca. Huajuapan de León, Oaxaca. pp. 336
- La Vuelta al Mundo en 80 Años, Vol. I, Huatulco: UMAR, 2016, pp. 427
- Derecho Internacional Público, 25th. Edition, Mexico: Porrúa, 2016, pp, 1003
- Después de la Tragedia. A 70 años de la Segunda Guerra Mundial. Seara Vázquez, Modesto and Lozano Vázquez, Alberto, Editors. Huatulco: UMAR, 2015, pp. 806. Author of the presentation, pp. 14–16 and author of the chapter I "La Última Guerra Mundial", pp. 17–86
- Novaya Model Universiteta. Seara Vázquez, Modesto and Igor Libin, Tatiana Oleinik, Evgueni Treiguer and Pérez Peraza, Jorge. Universiteti Rasvitia Opit Dlya Rossii, Moskvá: Mesdunarodnaya Akademia Otsenki and Konsultinga, 2012, pp. 433
- Bolonski Prozess Perspectivialy Rossii. Modesto Seara Vázquez and alia, Moskva, Miesdunarodnaya Akademia Otsenki i Konsaltinga, 2012, pp. 226
- La Sociedad Internacional Amorfa. Soluciones inadecuadas para problemas completos. Seara Vázquez, Modesto, Coordinator. Mexico and Huajuapan de León: UNAM and UMAR, 2011, pp. 654. Author of the Introduction, pp. 11–13 and Chapter I, "Un Mundo Convulso", pp. 17–58
- Vento de Queixuras, Mexico, 2011, pp. 94
- Un Nuevo Modelo de Universidad. Universidades para el desarrollo. 3rd. Edition, Huajuapan de León: UTM, 2019, pp. 312
- A New Model of University. Universities for Development. Updated version of the 1st. Spanish edition, Huajuapan de León: UTM, 2010, pp. 269
- La Organización de Naciones Unidas a los cincuenta años. (Editor), México: FCE, 1995, pp. 456. Author of the foreword and introduction "La Organización de Naciones Unidas: diagnóstico y tratamiento", pp. 7–39
- La Hora Decisiva, 3rd Edition., Mexico: Joaquín Mortiz: Planeta, 1995, pp. 417
- Una Nueva Carta para las Naciones Unidas, Huajuapan de León: UTM, 1993, pp. XXVII-80
- A New Charter for the United Nations. Huajuapan de León: UTM, 2004, pp. 357. Updated and modified English version of the previous one
- Tratado General de la Organización Internacional, 2nd. Edition. First Reprint. Mexico: FCE, 1985, pp. 1103
- Política Exterior de México, 3rd Edition. Mexico: Harla, 1985, pp. 414.
- Derecho y Política en el Espacio Cósmico, 2nd. Edition, Mexico: UNAM, 1982, pp. 169
- Mekishiko No-Gaikoseisaku (japanese modified version of La Política Exterior de México); Editor. Koyosobo, Kyoto, 1980, pp. 232
- Del Congreso de Viena a la Paz de Versalles, 2nd. Edition, Mexico: Porrúa, 1980, pp. 417
- La Paz Precaria. De Versalles a Danzig, 2nd. Edition., Mexico: UNAM, 1980, pp. 512
- El Socialismo en España, Mexico: UNAM, 1980 pp. 326
- La Sociedad Democrática, Mexico: UNAM, 1978, pp. 184
- Paz y Conflicto en la Sociedad Internacional, Mexico: UNAM, 1969, pp. 410
- Cosmic International Law, Detroit: Wayne State University Press, 1965, pp. 293
- Introducción al Derecho Internacional Cósmico, Mexico: UNAM, 1961, XV-314
- Études de Droit Interplanetaire, PhD thesis. mimeogr. Paris, 1959

== Articles ==
- El estado de preguerra, memoir presented (mimeographed) to the Spanish Society for International and Colonial Studies, (Madrid), 1954
- The Functional Regulation of the Extra-atmospheric Space, in Second Colloquium on the Law of Outer space, London 1959, Springer Verlag, Wien, 1960, pp. 139–146
- El problema del Espacio Cósmico en las Naciones Unidas, in Revista de Ciencias Políticas y Sociales (RCPS), Nr 22, 1960, pp. 569–576
- Guía bibliográfica sobre el espacio cósmico. Aspectos jurídicos y políticos, in Revista de Ciencias Políticas y Sociales. Nr 22, 1960, pp. 577–587
- El Congo. La Tragedia de un pueblo, in Cuadernos Americanos (CA), Nr 3, 1961, pp. 7–37
- Los países del Consejo de la Entente Africana, in Revista de Ciencias Políticas y Sociales, Nr 25, 1961, pp. 1–17
- El pensamiento y la contribución de Don Isidro Fabela al derecho internacional, in Cuadernos Americanos, Nr 5, 1961, pp. 71–88
- La ley número 5710 de Israel castigo a los nazis y sus colaboradores, in Boletín del Instituto de Derecho Comparado de México (BIDCM), Nr 42, Vol. 23 1961, pp. 651–654
- Comentarios a la Conferencia de Viena sobre Relaciones e Inmunidades Diplomáticas, in Revista de la Facultad de Derecho de México (RFDM), Nrs 43 and 44, 1961, pp. 787–808
- Aspectos jurídicos del reconocimiento por medio de satélites, in Boletín del Instituto de Derecho Comparado de México, Nr 43 1962, pp. 75–89
- El individuo ante las jurisdicciones internacionales, en la práctica actual, in Comunicaciones mexicanas al VI Congreso Internacional de Derecho Comparado, of Hamburg 1962, National University, Mexico, 1962, pp. 219–232
- La evolución del problema del desarme, in Mirador Cultural, Universidad Iberoamericana. Mexico, Nr 1, 1962, pp. 123–137
- La evolución reciente del problema del espacio cósmico en las Naciones Unidas, in Revista de Ciencias Políticas y Sociales, Nr 33, 1963, pp. 323–338
- Guía de lecturas para el estudiante de Ciencias Diplomáticas, in Revista de Ciencias Políticas y Sociales, 1963, pp. 7–30
- España a la hora de Europa. Examen y balance de una situación, in Cuadernos Americanos, Nr. 2, 1963, pp. 7–30
- El principio de utilizaciones pacíficas del espacio extra-atmosférico, in Il Diritto Aereo (Roma), Nr 8,1963, pp. 3–38
- Otvetstvennost y miedunarodnom kosmicheskobo prava, in Sovremenic problemi kosmicheskovo prava, Moscow, 1963, pp. 33–341
- El mundo en transición: I, Análisis del conflicto entre China y la URSS, in Cuadernos Americanos, Nr 3, 1964
- El mundo en transición: II, La coexistenica pacífica, in Cuadernos Americanos, Nr 4, 1964
- El mundo en transición: III, El fin del maniqueísmo internacional, in Cuadernos Americanos, Nr 5, 1964
- La IX Reunión de Consultation des Ministres des Affaires Etrangères et l'Affaire de Cuba, in Annuaire Francais de Droit International, 1964, Paris, 1965, pp. 638–653. (In spanish in Revista de la Facultad de Derecho de México, 1965)
- Dictamen jurídico sobre la crisis dominicana, in Mañana, Mexico, July 3, 1965. (Reproduced in several publications)
- Síntesis del Derecho Internacional Público, in Panorama del Derecho Mexicano, National University, Mexico, 1965, Vol. II, pp. 521–596 (also published as a separate brochure)
- Los propósitos y funciones del Instituto de Derecho Comparado, in Boletín del Instituto de Derecho Comparado de México, Nr 53, 1965, pp. 353–359
- La política exterior de los Estados Unidos, in Cuadernos Americanos, Nr 3, 1966, pp. 7–34
- Los conflictos de la ley nacional con los tratados internacionales, in Comunicaciones mexicanas al VII Congreso Internacional de Derecho Comparado, Upsala 1966, National University, Mexico, 1966, pp. 113–130
- La urgencia como elemento de la legítima defensa en derecho internacional, in Boletín del Instituto de Derecho Comparado de México, Nr 55, 1966, pp. 81–98
- La política exterior de México, in Revista de Ciencias Políticas y Sociales, Nr 40,1967, pp. 195–310
- Las reformas a la Carta de las Naciones Unidas, in Revista Española de Derecho Internacional (Madrid), 1968, pp. 43Z-448, special publication "Homenaje a la memoria de Don. Antonio de Luna"
- Teoría de las zonas de influencia, in Revista Mexicana de Ciencia Política (RMCP), 1971, pp. 25–32
- Humanidad y satélites: economía política y derecho, in Diálogos, May–June 1971, pp. 26–29
- Reconocimiento de China por Canadá e Italia in Boletín del Centro de Relaciones Internacionales (BCRI), Nr 1, 1970, pp. 24–25
- La Muerte de Gaulle, in Boletín del Centro de Relaciones Internacionales, Nr 1, 1970, pp. 25–26
- La nueva diplomacia mexicana, in Boletín del Centro de Relaciones Internacionales, Nr 4, 1971, pp. 1–5
- El problema del Oriente Medio, in Boletín del Centro de Relaciones Internacionales, Nr 5, 1971, pp. 1–3
- Pactos ejecutivos y el régimen constitucional de México, in Boletín del Centro de Relaciones Internacionales, Nr 5, 1971, pp. 47–49. (In collaboration)
- Les rélations du Mexique avec les Amériques in Le Monde Diplomatique, May 1971
- Errare humanum est, perseverare, etc., etc., o el dilema de la política asiática de los EE.UU., in Boletín del Centro de Relaciones Internacionales, Nr 6, 1971, pp. 18–24
- La política exterior de México respecto a América Latina, in Boletín del Centro de Relaciones Internacionales, Nr 7, 1971, pp. 73–81
- Las pruebas atómicas de Francia en el Pacífico, in Boletín del Centro de Relaciones Internacionales, Nr 8, 1971, pp. 46–49
- Los mitos que se derrumban, in Boletín del Centro de Relaciones Internacionales, Nr 9, 1971, pp. 8–14
- Inglaterra ¿es todavía una isla? in Boletín del Centro de Relaciones Internacionales, Nr 9, 1971, pp. 39–41
- El derecho de irse, in Boletín del Centro de Relaciones Internacionales, Nr 10, 1971, pp. 14
- Una nueva organización internacional: el Foro del Pacífico del Sur, in Boletín del Centro de Relaciones Internacionales, Nr 10, 1971, pp. 6–8
- México y la República Popular China, in Boletín del Centro de Relaciones Internacionales, Nr 10,1971, pp. 75–79
- La política exterior de México, in Pensamiento Político, October 1971, pp. 167–192
- La nueva estructura de la sociedad Internacional, in Boletín del Centro de Relaciones Internacionales, Nr 11, 1971
- El desenlace del problema chino, in Boletín del Centro de Relaciones Internacionales, Nr 12, 1971, pp. 4–8
- La política exterior de México en el umbral de una nueva época, en el umbral de una época, in México hoy, Nr, December 1971, pp. 2, 10-11
- Fuerza militar y poder político en el plano internacional, in Boletín del Centro de Relaciones Internacionales, Nr 12, 1971, pp. 1–3
- Algunos errores al juzgar la política exterior de México, in Boletín del Centro de Relaciones Internacionales, Nr 16, 1972, pp. 1–6
- España: Anverso y Reverso, in Boletín del Centro de Relaciones Internacionales, Nr 17, 1972, pp. 1–18
- Israel y los países árabes, veinticuatro años después, in Boletín del Centro de Relaciones Internacionales, Nr 18, may, 1972, pp. 1–14
- El conflicto del Alto Adigio; orígenes, evolución y solución, in Boletín del Centro de Relaciones Internacionales, Nr 18, 1972, pp. 61–64
- América Latina en el mundo multipolar y de la Comunidad Económica Europea ampliada, in Boletín del Centro de Relaciones Internacionales, Nr 20, 1972, pp. 1–15
- El regionalismo internacional, in Boletín del Centro de Relaciones Internacionales, Nr 21, 1972, pp. 1–5
- Las plumas de la paz, in Boletín del Centro de Relaciones Internacionales, Nr 22, 1972, pp. 1–8.
- El derecho de veto del tercer mundo en el Consejo de Seguridad, in Boletín del Centro de Relaciones Internacionales, Nr 24, 1972, pp. 1–3
- El triunfo electoral de Nixon, in Boletín del Centro de Relaciones Internacionales, Nr 25, 1972, pp. 1–3
- Ser judío en la Unión Soviética, in Boletín del Centro de Relaciones Internacionales, Nr 26, 1973, pp. 1–6
- La Ostpolitik de López Bravo, in Boletín del Centro de Relaciones Internacionales, Nr 27, 1973, pp. 14
- El mito del tercer mundo, in Boletín del Centro de Relaciones Internacionales, Nr 28, 1973
- Theorie der Einflussbereiche, in Multitudo Legum Jus Unum, Berlin, 1973, pp. 537–554
- Zones of Influence, in The Year Book of World Affairs, 1973, (London), pp. 301–315
- La Tercera potencia mundial, in Línea (México), November–December 1973, pp. 40
- Irán: un pueblo que se rejuvenece, in Pensamiento Político (Mexico), May 1975, pp. 19–32
- Federalismo y regionalismo: enfoques estático y dinámico, in Federalismo y regionalismo. Centro de Estudios Constitucionales, Madrid, 1979, pp. 429–445
- Estrategia global y desarme. Publicación preliminar in El Universal (México), September 5 to 12, 1980. In the press in "Reflexiones sobre el Mundo de Hoy", ENEP-ACATLAN, UNAM, Mexico
- La política exterior de México hacia los Estados Unidos: la lucha por la igualdad, in Las relaciones México-Estados Unidos Resultados de una investigación interdisciplinaria, UNAM, Mexico, 1981, pp. 263-297
- Algunas reflexiones sobre la humanidad en crisis, in Anuario Mexicano de relaciones internacionales, 1980, UNAM, Mexico, 1981, pp. 353-371
- Nuevo Orden Político Internacional y concepto de Intersoberanía. Preliminary publication in El Universal (México), July 22 and 27 and August 4, 1981. Reproduced in Derecho y Orden Económico Internacional, ENEP-ACATLAN, UNAM, Mexico
- Self Determination and the Right to Leave, 12 Israel Yearbook on Human Rights (1982)
- La guerra nuclear, en Polémica (Barcelona), October 1982, pp. 28-30. 90
- Autodeterminación y derecho de irse, in A.M.R.I., 1981, UNAM, Mexico, 1982, pp. 585-598
- ¿Habrá un mañana?, in AMRI. 1987, Mexico, pp. 499-508
- "Destruction of Food (for Economic Reasons) as a Crime Against Humanity", in Philip Ehrensaft and Fred Knelman (Editors), The Right to Food. Technology, Policy and Third World Agriculture, Montreal: Farma, 1987. pp. 179-185
- La crisis mundial y los Modelos de Sociedad Internacional, in Cursos de Derecho Internacional de Vitoria-Gasteiz, 1985, Universidad del País Vasco, 1986
- Las migraciones masivas, fenómeno de nuestro tiempo, in Audiencia pública. Trabajadores migratorios, Senado de la República, Universidad Nacional, Mexico, 1986, pp. 27-33
- La destrucción de alimentos (por razones económicas) como crimen contra la humanidad, in A.M.R.I., 1984, 1986
- Estrategia global y desarme, en Jurídica, 1985. Anuario del Departamento de Derecho de la Universidad Iberoamericana, Mexico
- El Asilo frente al Derecho Constitucional Mexicano, in El reto jurídico del Derecho de Asilo, Academia Mexicana de Derechos Humanos, El Colegio de México, Mexico, 1986
- La Organización de Naciones Unidas: Algunas reflexiones en torno a su valor actual, Intervenciones en la presentación del libro 40 años de presencia de México en las Naciones Unidas, Secretaría de Relaciones Exteriores, México, 1986, in Revista Mexicana de Política Exterior, Nr 11, April–June 1986
- Ocupación militar mutua. Plan de acción para facilitar el desarme, in A.M.R.I., 1983, Mexico, 1986, pp. 577-593
- La Revolución mexicana a fin de siglo: una reflexión sobre el porvenir, in México: Revolución y Modernidad, ICAP-PRI, Mexico, 1987, pp. 331-346
- El principio de interés común de la humanidad y el derecho del mar, in Estudios en honor del Doctor Luis Recasens Siches, Vol. II, UNAM, Mexico, 1987, pp. 643-650
- Democracia global y paz, in Congreso internacional sobre la paz, Volume II, UNAM, Mexico, 1987, pp. 863-870.
- El dilema de la humanidad: revolución total o entropía terminal, in A.M.R.I., 1985, Mexico, 1987, pp. 357-365
- Utopía realista vs. Realismo utópico: un llamamiento para la acción in A.M.R.I., 1986, Mexico, 1988
- Estrategias para el fortalecimiento de las instituciones globales, in A.M.R.I., 1987, Mexico, 1988
- Hacia el Concepto de la Intersoberania, in Estudios en homenaje al Prof. José Pérez Montero, Universidad de Oviedo, 1988
- El Verdadero Sentido de la Democracia, in Línea, 1989
- El Exterior, in Diego Valadez and Mario Ruíz Massieu (coordinators), La Transformación del Estado Mexicano, Diana, 1989, pp. 231-246
- Los Objetivos de la Política Exterior Mexicana en el actual Contexto Internacional, in Instituto Matías Romero de Estudios Internacionales, Memoria del Foro de Consulta sobre los Factores Externos y el Contexto Internacional, SRE, Mexico, 1989, pp. 47-52
- América Latina y el Caribe, Frente a una Europa Unificada, in Rosario Green (Coordinator), Democracia y Recuperación Económica en América Latina, El Día en Libros, Mexico, 1990, pp. 45-57
- El Artículo 2. Párrafo 7 de la Carta y el concepto de intersoberanía, in A.M.R.I., 1988
- México ante un mundo cambiante, Presentation to the National Consultation Forum, organized by the Senate of the Republic, "Las Relaciones Comerciales de México con el Mundo", "Memoria" Senado de la República, Mexico, Vol. III, pp. 90-95
- El asilo frente al derecho constitucional mexicano, in Relaciones Internacionales, Vol. XI, Nr 46, September 1989, pp. 16-19
- National Factors Affecting International Relations Studies in Mexico, in Longin Pastusiak (Editor), National Context of International Relations Studies, Polish Institute of International Affairs, Varsovia, 1990, pp. 105-127
- La ONU: Rejuvenecimiento o Senilidad, in Universidad de México, August 1991, pp. 19-20
- Factores nacionales que afectan los estudios de las relaciones internacionales, in Estudios Jurídicos en Memoria de Alfonso Noriega Cantú, Porrúa Editorial, Mexico, 1991, pp. 415-425
- La cuestión de la soberanía sobre las islas y el Golfo de Fonseca, in Memoria del Congreso Internacional sobre Fronteras en Iberoamérica. Ayer y Hoy. Mexicali, B.C.: Universidad Autónoma de Baja California, 1990, pp.148-165
- La reglamentación jurídica del espacio, in México y la Astronomía, México: Cámara de Diputados, 1994, pp. 101-104
- El Consejo de Seguridad: ¿Crisis de madurez o enfermedad terminal?, in Estudios en honor de Don César Sepúlveda, Mexico, 1995
- Régimen Jurídico del Golfo de Fonseca, in Estudios jurídicos en memoria de Eduardo García Maynez, Porrúa, Mexico, 1996, pp. 471-515
- The United Nations Security Council in 1995. Mid Age Crisis or Terminal Illness? in Global Governance, ACUNS and United Nations University (Boulder, CO) Vol. 1, Nr 2, 1996
- Prologue to Fernando Serrano Migallón, Isidro Fabela y la Diplomacia Mexicana, 2nd. Edition, Col. "Sepan Cuantos", Porrúa, 1997, pp. IX-XI
- Globalización e Interdependencia, in LiberAmicorum Héctor Fix Zamudio, Corte Interamericana de Derechos Humanos, San José de Costa Rica, 1998, pp. 1389-1400
- La reglamentación internacional del medio marino, in María del Carmen Rodríguez Hernández and Claudia Hernández Fernández, (Compilers), Océano: ¿Fuente inagotable de Recursos, UNAM-SEMARNAP, Mexico, 1999, pp. 423-450
- Gobernabilidad: Mitos y Realidades, in José Natividad González Parás, La Gobernabilidad Democrática en México, INAP, 2000, pp. 15-27
- La enseñanza del derecho internacional, in Jornadas de derecho internacional 2001, OEA, Washington, 2002, pp. 453-462
- La discusión ociosa: No Intervención o Derecho de Injerencia, in Juan Carlos Velázquez Elizarrarás, Nuevos Desarrollos temáticos para el Estudio del Derecho Internacional, UNAM, 2004, pp. 13-30
- Factores, bases y fundamentos de la Política Exterior de México, Prologue to Rafael Velázquez, Ed. Plaza & Valdés, Mexico, 2005
- Igor Libin, Jorge Pérez Peraza, Modesto Seara Vázquez and Olga Sizoba, Daroga v Buduchee (Rol Nauki, Tegnologuii i Obrasovanniya v EkonomikeRossii y Meksiki),Moskvá: Miesdunarodnaya Akademia Otsenki i Konsaltinga, 2009 (English version in 2011)
- Obrazovaterni Turism v State Oaxaca. Seara Vázquez, Modesto, O. V. Kurachenko, Igor Libin, V. Prodnakova Romeiko, Rodrigo Asaola and T. I. Pustovitova, in Eknonomika Ossiiv Usloviaj Mirovogo Krizica, MAOK, Moscow, 2009, pp. 83-99
- Sovremennie Problemi Vischei Schcoli Mexiki and Rossii. I. Libin, T. L. Oleinik, J. Pérez Peraza, M. Seara Vázquez, O. V. Sizova and E. M. Treiguer, (Contemporary problems of higher education in Mexico and Russia) in Strateguicheskie Napravleniya Razvichiya Economiki v Usloviyaj Krizisa, RIO MAOK, Moscow, 2010, pp. 8-57
- Produktovioe Strateguii Naseleniya Biznesa i Gosudartsva v Usloviyaj Krizisa, I. Libin, E. M. Treiguer, Olga Sizoba, J. Pérez Peraza, M. Seara Vázquez and H. H.Hoffmann, in Strateguicheskie Napravleniya Razvichiya Economiki v Usloviyaj Krizisa, RIO MAOK, Moscow, 2010, pp. 180-217
- Distanzionno-OchnoeObuchenie b Universitete 'NovaUniversitas'. MSV and Liubin, I. YA, J. García Matías, T. L. Oleinik, P. Azevedo Luría, in Mesnudarodnii Jurnal Prokladnij i Fundamentalnij Issledobanii, Nr 9, 2013, pp. 45-48
- Obrasobatelnaya, Issledobatelskaya i Kulturno-probeitelskaya Deyatelnost Sistemi Universitetov Stata Oaxaca s Sobremennij Usloviyaj. MSV y I. Ya. Liubin,, in Ekonomika Rossiib Usloviaj Modernisatzii: Problemi, Perspektivi, Rechaniya, Moskva: Miesdunarodnaya Akademia Otsenki i Konsaltinga, 2013, pp. 7-138
- Obuchenie Studentov b Robotizirobannoi Klinike Universiteta UNSIS. M. Seara Vázquez et alia, in ActualnieSozialno-Ekonomicheskie Problemi Sobremennobo Mira: Nauka i Praktika, Moskva: Miesdunarodnaya Akademia Otsenki i Konsaltinga, 2013, pp. 52-65
- El Jurista, in Lucía Saenz Viesca, Joaquín Diez-Canedo Flores and José Alejandro Vargas Castro (Coordinators), Presentation of Enrique Peña Nieto, Prologue of Emilio Chuayffet, Isidro Fabela. A 50 Años de su fallecimiento, Secretaría de Educación Pública, Mexico, 2014, pp. 93-125
- Prologue to Silvia Reyes Mora and Beatriz Carely Luna Olivera, (Editors), Modelación Matemática, Ingeniería, Economía, Biología y Ciencias Sociales, Huajuapan de León: Universidad Tecnológica de la Mixteca, 2016

== Recognitions ==
- Decoration of Aguila Azteca, Mexican Government, 1976
- Castelao Medal, Xunta de Galicia, 2011
- National Research Professor Emeritus, Consejo Nacional de Ciencia y Tecnología (CONACyT, English: National Council of Science and Technology), 1997
- Honorary Engineer in Forestry, Madrid Polytechnical University, 2009
- Medal Donají, by the City of Oaxaca de Juárez, 2008
- Medal José López Alavez, by the City Council of Huajuapan de León, 1999
- Medal Antonio de León, by the City Council of Huajuapan de León, 1998
- Gold Medal to the Academic Merit, National University of Mexico (UNAM), 2011
- Torres Bodet Prize, to the Internationalist of the Year, University of the Americas, Puebla, 1986
- Distinction "Gallego Universal", by the Organization Sexta Provincia, 2011
- Gold Key of the City Council of Tijuana, 1987
- Citizen of Merit 2009, Consejo Estatal de Participación Ciudadana de Oaxaca A.C.
- Award "Huaxuacac" 2004, from the Oaxacan Bar Association (Barra Oaxaqueña de Abogados y Pasantes de Derecho Independientes A.C.)
- Honorary President of the Mexican Association of International Studies, since 1993
- Award to the Educational and Cultural Merit, Huatulco, 2005

== Eponymous ==
- Plaza Modesto Seara, in the City of Allariz, since September 11, 2011
