= Huajuapan de León =

- Municipality and city
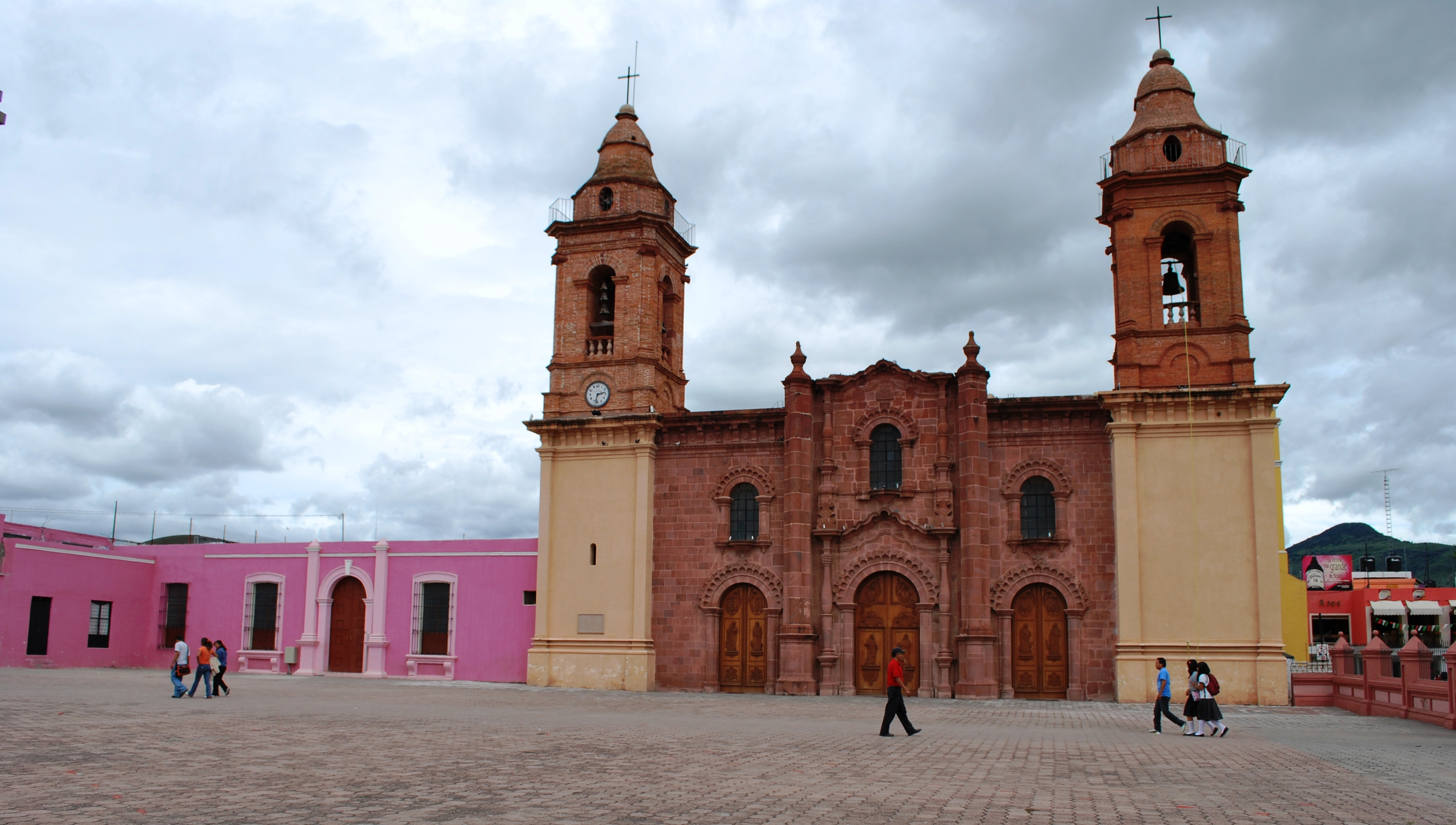
- Cathedral of Huajuapan

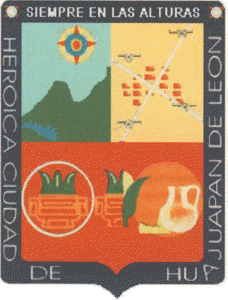
- Coat of arms

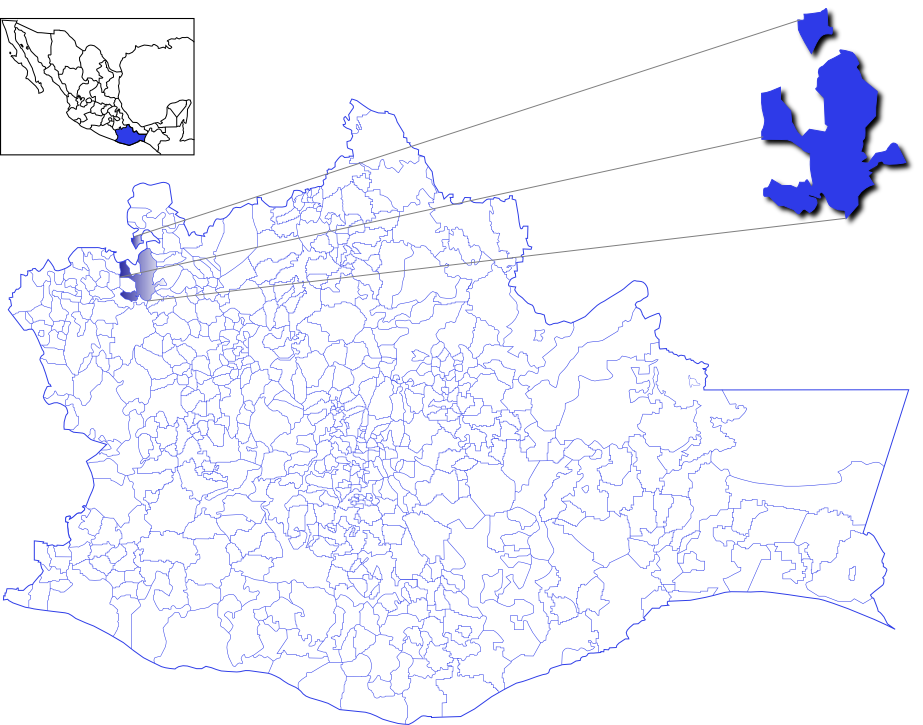
- Location of the municipality in Oaxaca

- Location in Mexico
- Coordinates: 17°48′N 97°46′W
- Country: Mexico
- State: Oaxaca
- District: Huajuapan District

Area
  - Total: 325.8 km^{2} (125.8 sq mi)
  - City: 15.61 km^{2} (6.03 sq mi)

Population (2020 census)
  - Total: 78,318
  - Density: 240.4/km^{2} (622.6/sq mi)
  - City: 56,163
  - City density: 3,598/km^{2} (9,318/sq mi)
- Time zone: UTC-6 (Central Standard Time)
- Area code: 953
- Website: (in Spanish) https://www.huajuapandeleon.gob.mx

Heroica Ciudad de Huajuapan de León [waˈxwapan de leˈon] (Mixtec: Ñuu dee, meaning Place of Brave People) is a city with a surrounding municipality located in the northwestern part of the Mexican state of Oaxaca. It is part of the Huajuapan District in the north of the Mixteca Region. The municipality has a population of 78,318, the sixth-largest community in the state in population. It is located at the intersection of Federal Highways 125 and 190. The name of Huajuapan comes from the Nahuatl words huaxin = huaje, ohtli = road, and apan = river. Literally, River of the huajes. The town was elevated to an honorary Mexican status in June 1843 in remembrance of the siege of Huajuapan, a battle between the royal army and the insurgents led by José María Morelos. The battle was won by the insurgents. The city was named after Antonio de León, a hero of the Mexican War of Independence.

== History ==
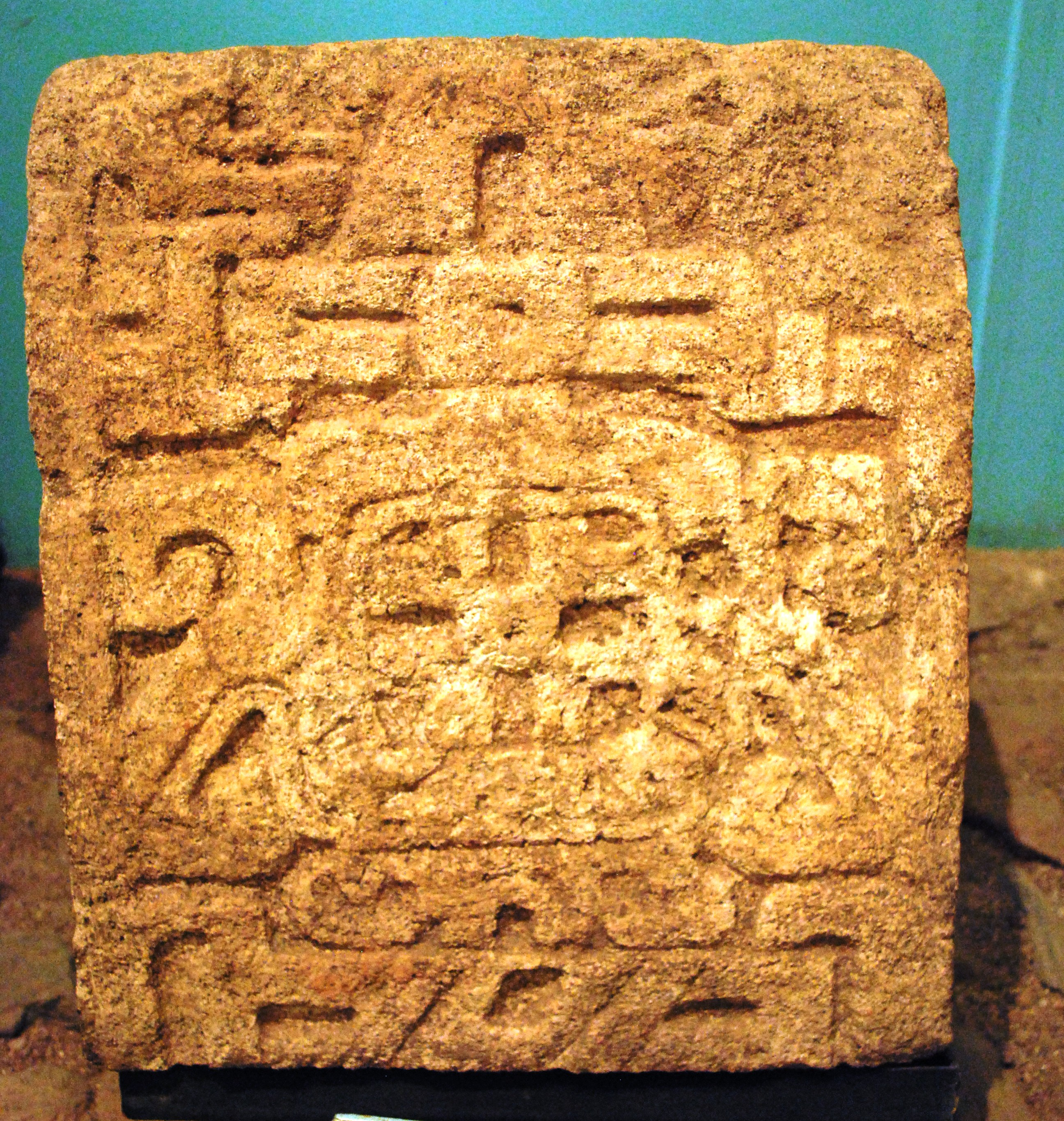
One of the gravestone found in Tomb 5 of the Cerro de las Minas archeological site

The first inhabitants of this area are called the Ñuu Yate (ancient people) who formed their settlement in what is now the town of Huajuapan around 400 BCE. The initial settlement had about 500 to 1500 inhabitants, but as the city grew to its height between 350 and 800 CE it had up to 300,000 people in the valley. The next culture to flourish here was the Mixteca-Puebla culture at about 1200. During this time period, Huajuapan was one of several population centers on the slopes of the Cerro del Sombererito and Cerro de Acatlima, but it was the economic, cultural and ceremonial center of the valley. Sometime shortly after 1521, the Spaniards took control of this region. It is known that Francisco Orozco, along with Augustinians Fray Bernardino Minaya and Fray Gonzales Lucero were the first Spanish to arrive here. However, no Spanish records exist for this region until 1542.

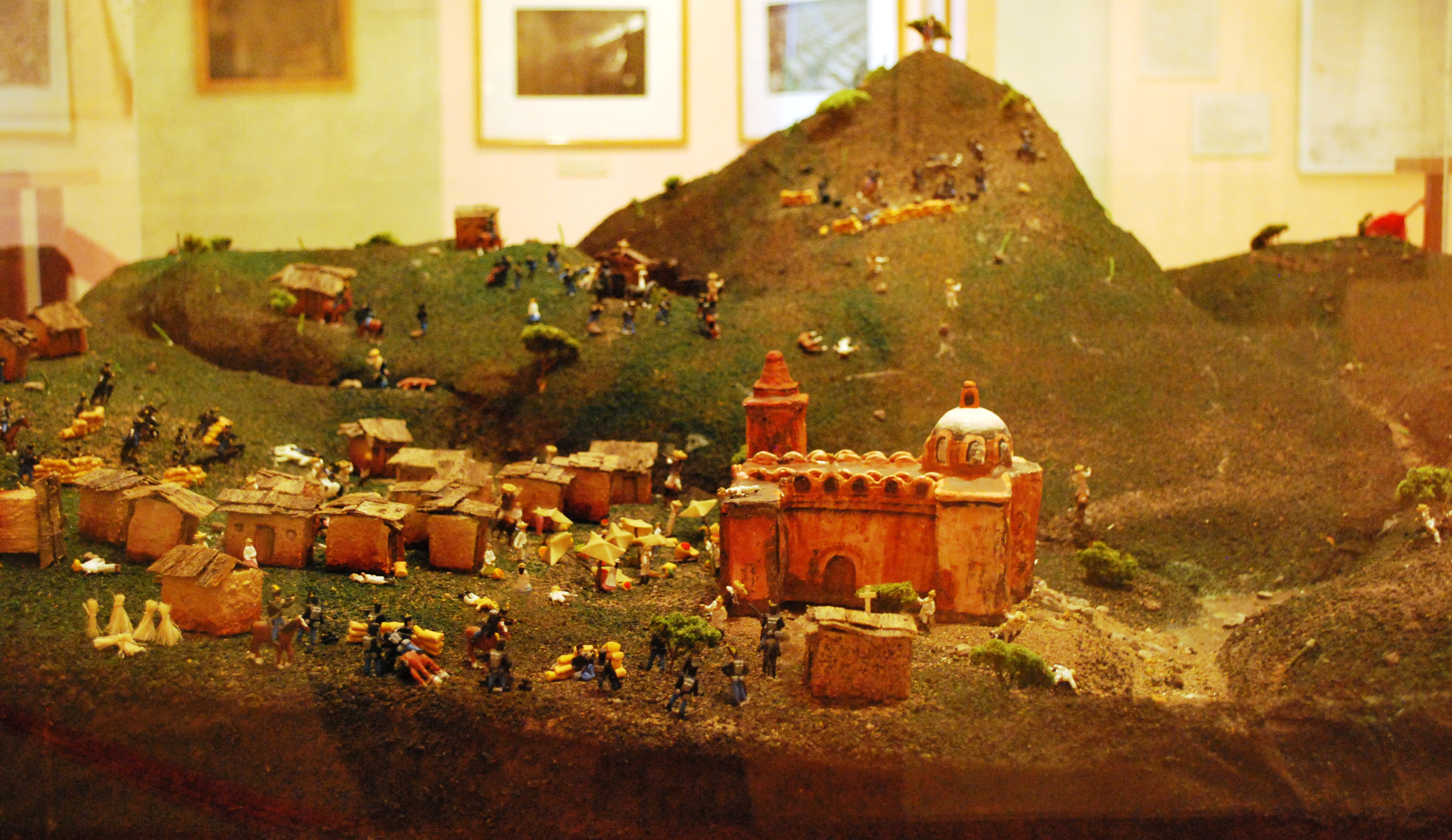
Model of Huajuapan during the early colonial period

The Spanish town of Huajuapan was founded in 1561 by order of the viceregal authorities in Mexico City. Prior to this the low parts of the valley were not organized and merchants travelling through the area often suffered from highway bandits. Residents of the hill areas around the valley were ordered to move to the valley floor to found the city. The economy here during the colonial period was dominated by haciendas that exploited the native labor of the region.

During the Mexican War of Independence, this village was subject to a siege by insurgent forces that lasted 111 days. Resistance of the town was finally broken in June 1812 by Coronel Valerio Trujano, with help from General José María Morelos. After Independence, the village began to grow, becoming a town named Huajuapan de León. In 1884, the town was declared a city by then-governor Mariano Jiménez.

Initially, the city of Huajuapan was the seat of a district under the 1825 Oaxaca state constitution, with the name of Huajuapan-Silacayoapan. In 1844, the state was reorganized into new districts with Huajuapan being one of them. In 1858, it was reorganized again, but Huajuapan remained the seat of a district.

== Geography ==
Huajuapan serves as municipal seat of the Huajuapan municipality, which has an area of 361.06 km^{2} (139.41 sq mi) and a population of 45,321. It is located in a rugged and mountainous area of Oaxaca, The Mixteca Baja (part of the Mixteca region of Oaxaca), and the climate in this area is dry most of the year. In 1980 it was the worst-affected region of an earthquake which left 300 homeless across Oaxaca.

=== Climate ===
Huajuapan de León experiences a warm humid subtropical climate (Köppen Cwa).

Climate data for Huajuapan de León (1951–2010)
Month	Jan	Feb	Mar	Apr	May	Jun	Jul	Aug	Sep	Oct	Nov	Dec	Year
Record high °C (°F)	31.0 (87.8)	36.3 (97.3)	38.0 (100.4)	38.5 (101.3)	41.0 (105.8)	35.0 (95.0)	32.0 (89.6)	32.5 (90.5)	34.0 (93.2)	31.5 (88.7)	34.2 (93.6)	32.5 (90.5)	41.0 (105.8)
Mean daily maximum °C (°F)	26.9 (80.4)	28.3 (82.9)	30.6 (87.1)	31.7 (89.1)	31.1 (88.0)	28.3 (82.9)	27.3 (81.1)	27.5 (81.5)	26.8 (80.2)	27.1 (80.8)	27.3 (81.1)	26.8 (80.2)	28.3 (82.9)
Daily mean °C (°F)	17.2 (63.0)	18.6 (65.5)	20.9 (69.6)	22.6 (72.7)	23.1 (73.6)	22.0 (71.6)	20.9 (69.6)	20.9 (69.6)	20.7 (69.3)	19.8 (67.6)	18.7 (65.7)	17.4 (63.3)	20.2 (68.4)
Mean daily minimum °C (°F)	7.5 (45.5)	8.9 (48.0)	11.2 (52.2)	13.5 (56.3)	15.2 (59.4)	15.7 (60.3)	14.6 (58.3)	14.4 (57.9)	14.6 (58.3)	12.6 (54.7)	10.2 (50.4)	8.1 (46.6)	12.2 (54.0)
Record low °C (°F)	−1.0 (30.2)	−1.0 (30.2)	1.0 (33.8)	7.5 (45.5)	9.5 (49.1)	10.0 (50.0)	10.0 (50.0)	9.0 (48.2)	8.0 (46.4)	1.2 (34.2)	1.0 (33.8)	−0.5 (31.1)	−1.0 (30.2)
Average precipitation mm (inches)	6.3 (0.25)	7.7 (0.30)	10.1 (0.40)	18.3 (0.72)	78.1 (3.07)	139.7 (5.50)	120.8 (4.76)	112.6 (4.43)	146.0 (5.75)	58.0 (2.28)	12.8 (0.50)	8.7 (0.34)	719.1 (28.31)
Average precipitation days (≥ 0.1 mm)	1.0	1.5	1.9	3.9	9.6	14.4	12.4	11.6	13.7	6.8	2.1	1.4	80.3
Average relative humidity (%)	59	56	52	56	57	67	67	67	71	68	65	62	62
Source: Servicio Meteorológico Nacional (humidity, 1981–2000)

== Notable sites ==
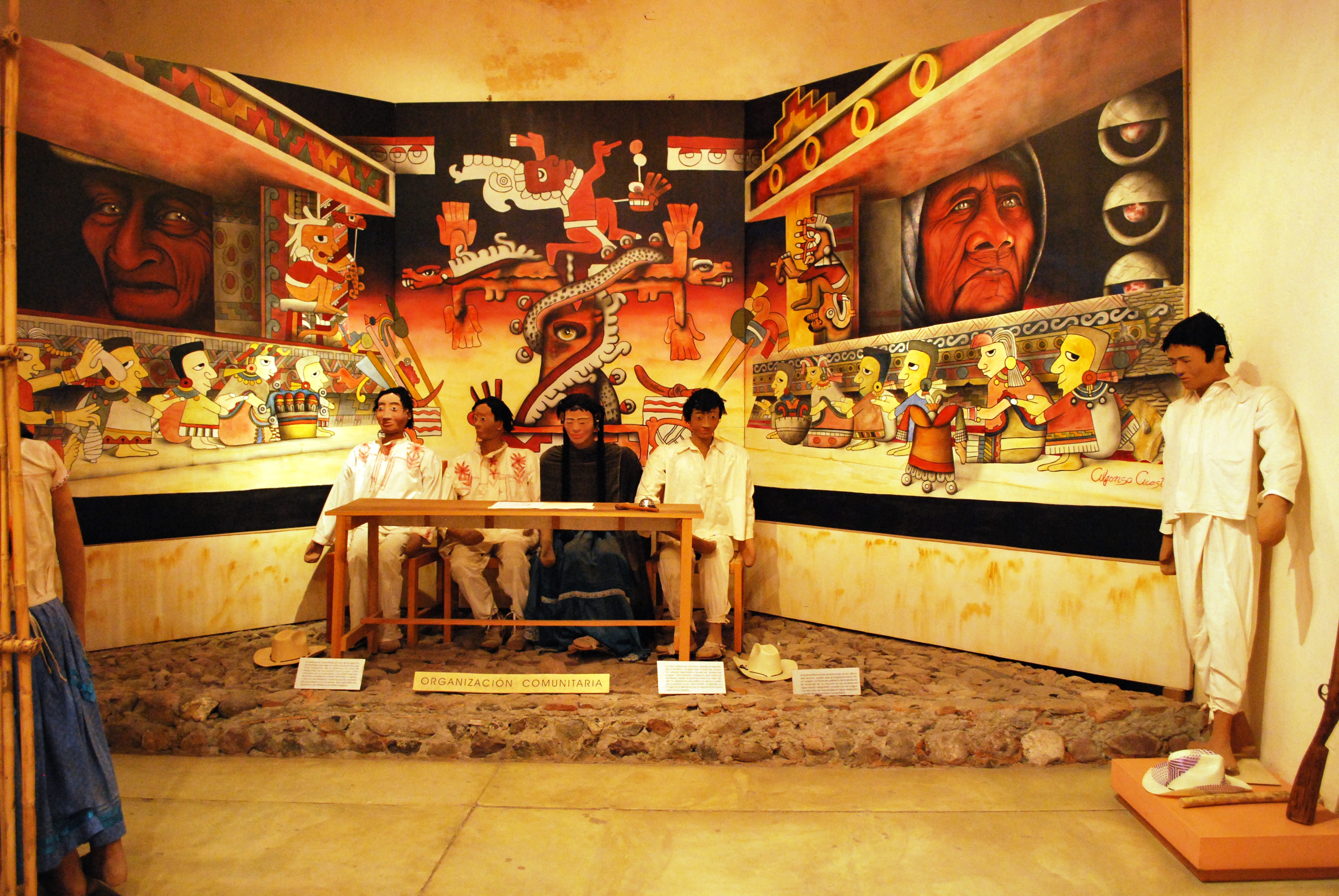
Model of a traditional Mixtec village council at the Regional Museum

In the center of the city is found the Catedral de Nuestra Señora de Guadalupe (Cathedral of Our Lady of Guadalupe) and the adjacent Capilla del Señor de los Corazones (Chapel of Our Lord of the Hearts). The Antonio de León central plaza is located next to the cathedral and the municipal palace. Its paths are lined with trees and garden spaces and an octagonal kiosk in the center. Near the town are the Cerros de las Minas, an archeological site and Las Campanas, which are calcite rocks from which drip water from a small stream.

There is also the Museo Regional de Huajuapan (Regional Museum of Huajuapan) that specialized in the Mixtec cultures of this area.

=== Cerro de las Minas ===
The hill now known as the Cerro de las Minas, which dominates the valley of Huajuapan, was the site of an ancient Mixtec community. The site lies in a Mixtec region known as Ñuiñe, or lowland Mixtec.

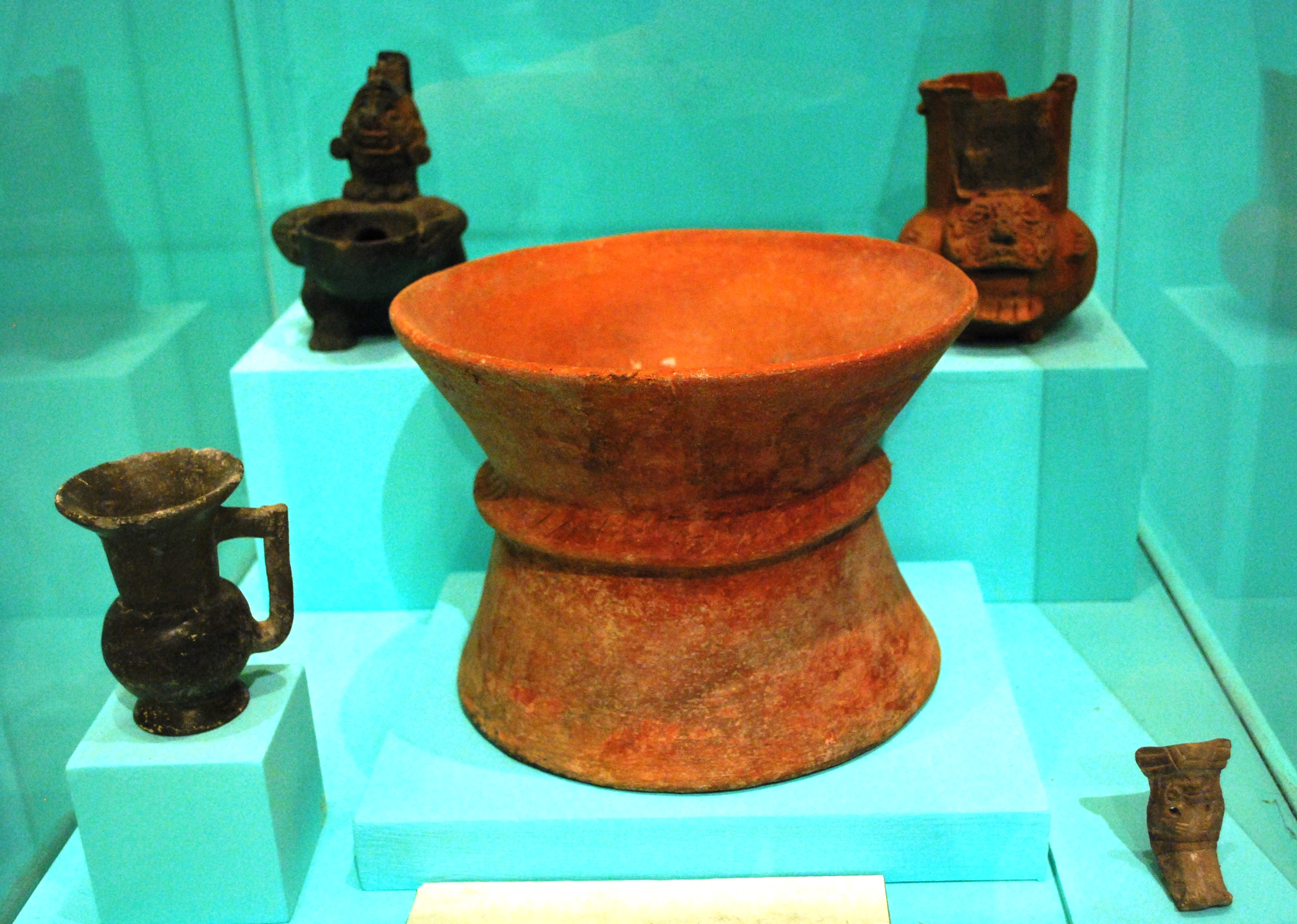
Ceramics from the Cerro de las Minas site

The site covers fifty hectares and was mostly inhabited by the upper social classes of the time. It was supported by farmlands in the valley below. The ceremonial area is dominated by three large constructed mounds which are eight meters high and forty meters in diameter. They are lined up and separated by large open platforms for a total length of 180 meters. The site also contain a Mesoamerican ballcourt that is about sixty meters long and fifteen meters wide. The housing units have stone foundations and either adobe or stone walls. In these foundations numerous human burials have been found.

There is also a large plaza situated on the south side which contains a mass grave. In this grave, large quantities of ceramics were found of native design as well as a multicolored urn with an image of the god of wind or fire, with a brazier on its head. It is seated on a platform with four glyphs indicating location. It is now on display at the Museum of Oaxaca.

The site is considered to have two stages. One is called Ñudee, which is the original Mixtec name for Huajuapan and means "place of the brave," and covers the era between 400 BCE and 250 CE. The other is called Nuiñe and covers the time period between 250 and 800 CE. Artifacts here show that during both periods, this settlement had strong ties with other Mixtec settlements in other parts of modern-day Oaxaca. The area began to decline after 800 CE, possibly due to military pressure from lords in other regions. The region would not grow again until the Spanish established their city here in the 16th century.

== Demographics ==
The great majority of the people living in Huajuapan de León are of Mixtec descent. The Mixtec language is not generally heard in the city, however. The Mixteca region of which Huajuapan is part has a high rate of immigration to the United States and remittances are important for the local economy.

== Festival of the Señor de los Corazones ==
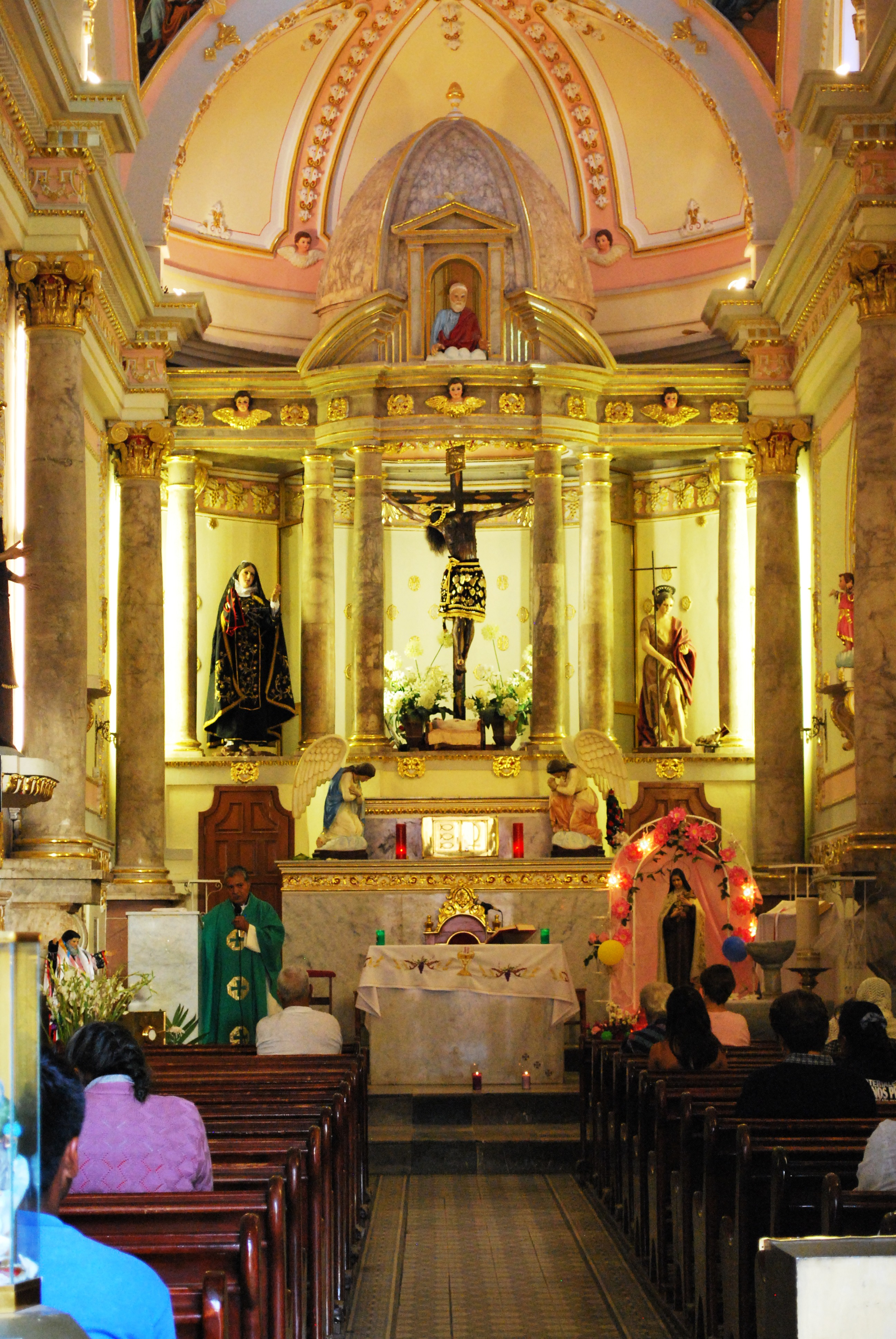
Main altar of the Chapel of the Señor de los Corazones with image

The festival of the Señor de los Corazones is related to the siege that Huajuapan endured for 111 days during the War of Independence. José Remigio Sarabia Rojas, an Indian from the nearby town of Santiago Nuyoo, evaded royalist lines and managed to reach José María Morelos who was in Chilapa, Guerrero. He told Morelos that Huajuapan was under siege and needed help. Morelos first sent General Miguel Bravo, who arrived in the city with thousands of men along with Vicente Guerrero. To ask for divine aid in the rescue of Huajuapan, Morelos asked his troops to observe a novena. According to legend, the novena ended on 23 July, the same day the insurgents were able to break the siege.

The festival is celebrated on 23 July of every year, with a novena beginning on 14 July. Processions, organized by a brotherhood created especially for this purpose, are held for each day of the novena, with participants carrying an image of the Señor de los Corazones. The 23rd is celebrated with cultural and artistic events as well as fair rides and fireworks. Mass is celebrated to give thanks for the divine aid received during the siege. On the 24th one last major procession for the image wanders through the main streets of the city from eight in the morning to three in the afternoon, from the Chapel of the Sagrario to the cathedral.

== Notable people ==
- Ricardo Osorio, soccer player
- José López Alavés, the author of the world-famous Mixteca song was born in Huajuapan de León, Oaxaca, on 14 July 1889

== Education ==
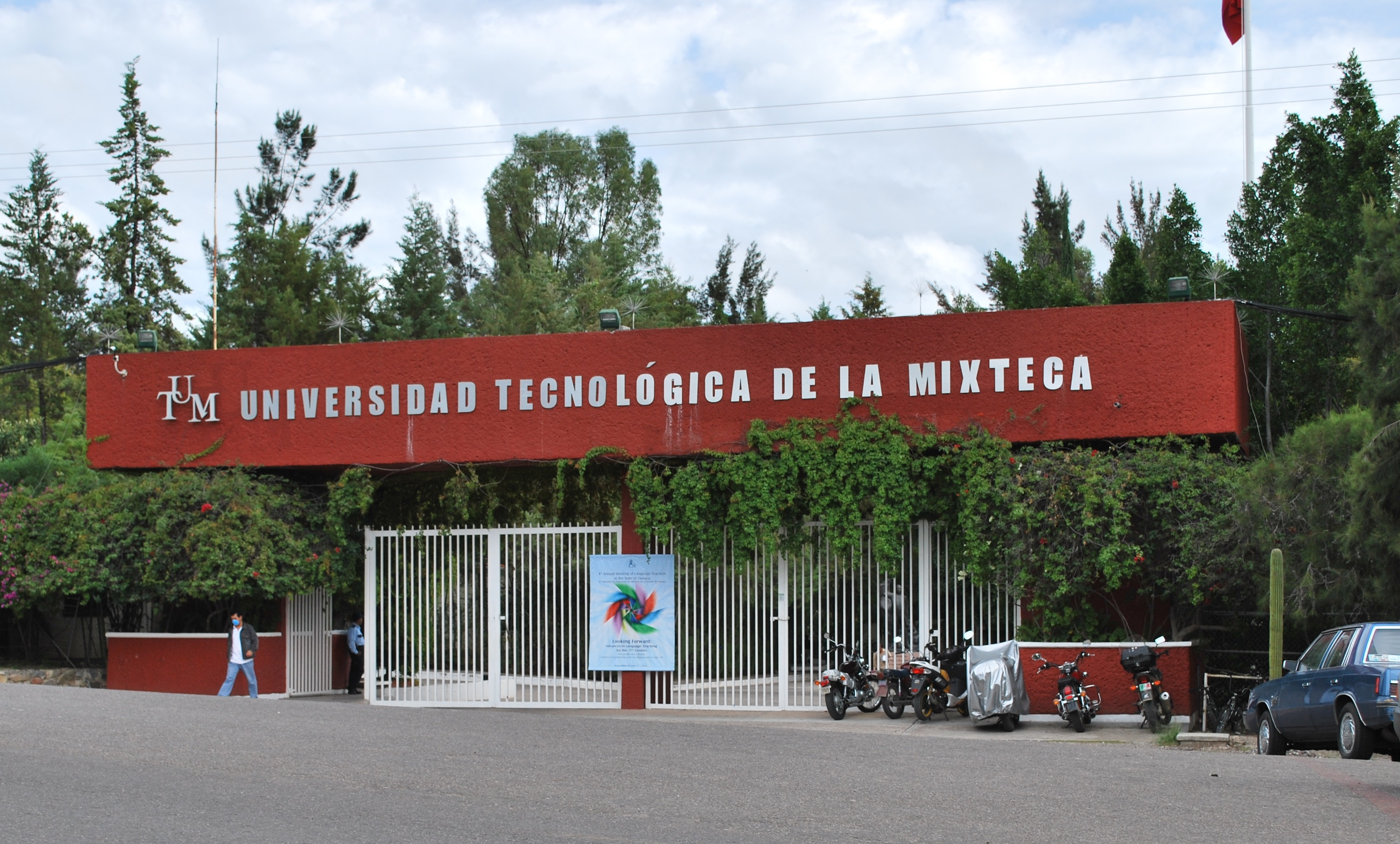
Main entrance of UTM

Huajuapan has a relatively low rate of illiteracy (6.8%) in comparison with national and state statistics. However, according to municipal statistics, one can note that at most, forty-seven out of every hundred inhabitants finished primary school while those that partly attended high school reach 23%. These statistics are low compared with the national average of people that finish their primary, which stands at 7.34 years. The state's average is 5.29 years.

An important regional university (Universidad Tecnológica de la Mixteca) has been operating in Huajuapan since 1991 with the aim of promoting development of the area.
