= Villa Tejúpam de la Unión =

Villa Tejupam de la Unión
- Municipality and town
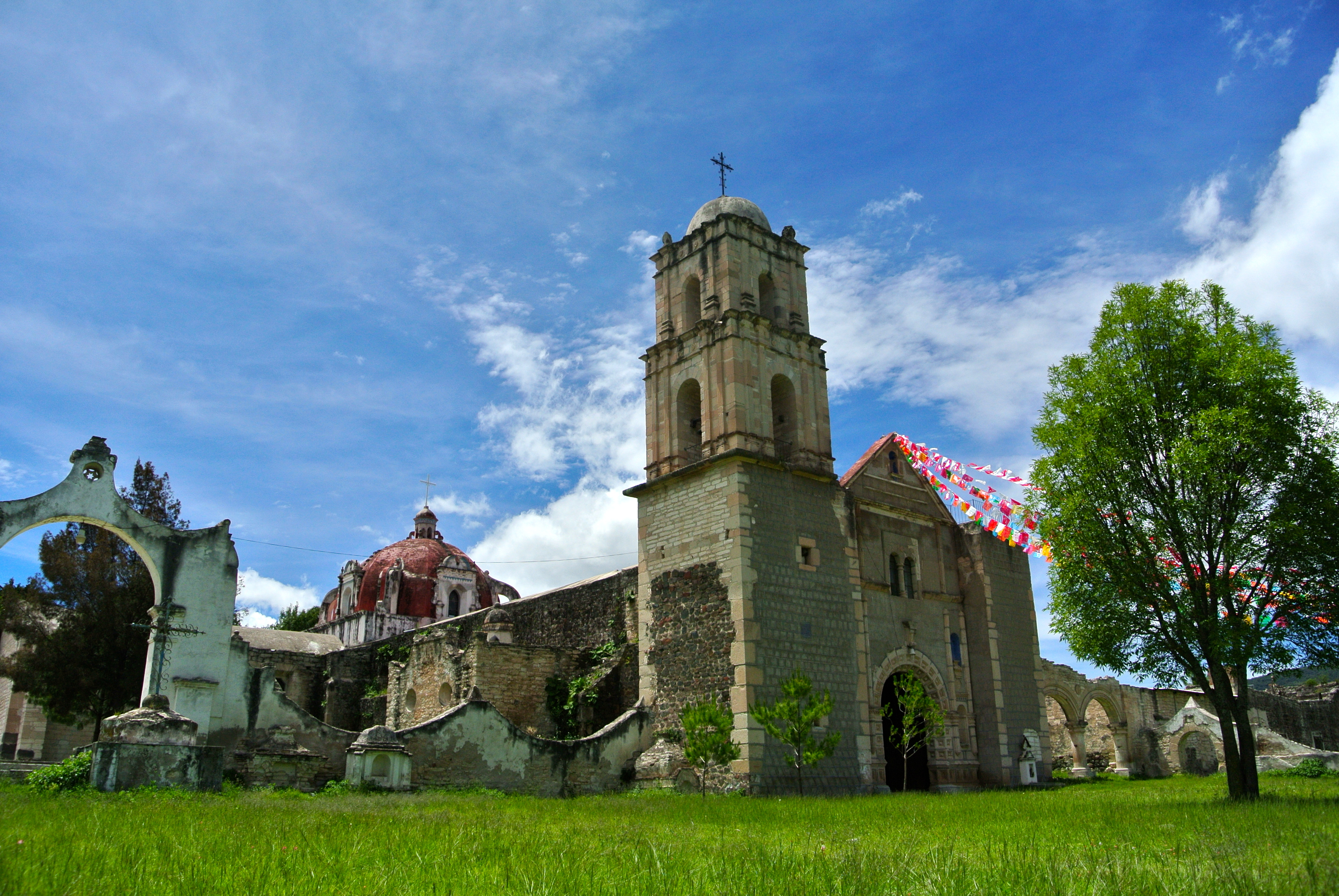

- Location in Mexico
- Coordinates: 17.3167°N 97.4667°W
- Country: Mexico
- State: Oaxaca

Population (2005)
  - Total: 2,419
- Time zone: UTC-6 (Central Standard Time)

Villa Tejupam de la Unión is a town and municipality in Oaxaca in south-western Mexico. The municipality covers an area of km^{2}. It is part of the Teposcolula District in the center of the Mixteca Region.

As of 2020, the municipality had a total population of 2,419.
