= San José del Peñasco =

- Municipality and town
- Location in Mexico
- Coordinates: 16°18′N 96°30′W
- Country: Mexico
- State: Oaxaca

Area
  - Total: 75.3 km^{2} (29.1 sq mi)

Population (2005)
  - Total: 1,863
- Time zone: UTC-6 (Central Standard Time)

San José del Peñasco is a town and municipality in Oaxaca in south-western Mexico. The municipality covers an area of 75.3 km^{2}. It is part of the Miahuatlán District in the south of the Sierra Sur Region.

As of 2005, the municipality had a total population of 1,863.
