= San Pedro Mártir Yucuxaco =

- Municipality and town
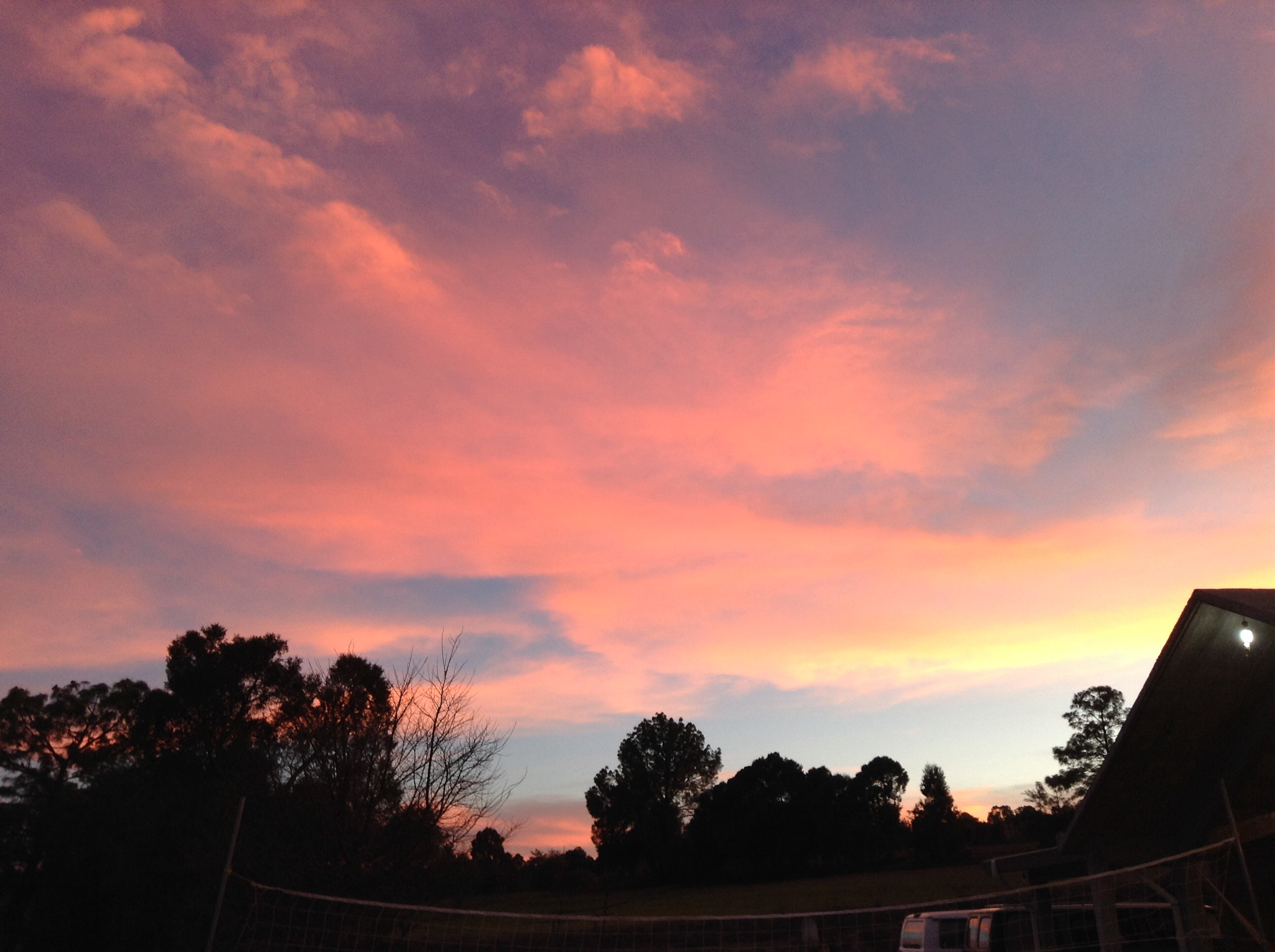

- Location in Mexico
- Coordinates: 17°26′N 97°37′W
- Country: Mexico
- State: Oaxaca

Population (2010)
  - Total: 1,405
- Time zone: UTC-6 (Central Standard Time)

San Pedro Mártir Yucuxaco is a town and municipality in Oaxaca in south-western Mexico. The municipality covers an area of km^{2}. It is part of the Tlaxiaco District in the south of the Mixteca Region.

As of 2010, the municipality had a total population of 1,405.
