= Santiago Huauclilla =

- Municipality and town
- Location in Mexico
- Coordinates: 17°27′N 97°05′W
- Country: Mexico
- State: Oaxaca

Population (2005)
  - Total: 607
- Time zone: UTC-6 (Central Standard Time)

Santiago Huauclilla is a town and municipality in Oaxaca in south-western Mexico. The municipality covers an area of km^{2}. It is part of the Nochixtlán District in the southeast of the Mixteca Region.

As of 2005, the municipality had a total population of 607.
