= San Francisco Nuxaño =

- Municipality and town
- Location in Mexico
- Coordinates: 17°23′N 97°21′W
- Country: Mexico
- State: Oaxaca

Area
  - Total: 21.69 km^{2} (8.37 sq mi)

Population (2005)
  - Total: 341
- Time zone: UTC-6 (Central Standard Time)

San Francisco Nuxaño is a town and municipality in Oaxaca in south-western Mexico. The municipality covers an area of 21.69 km^{2}. It is part of the Nochixtlán District in the southeast of the Mixteca Region.

As of 2005, the municipality's population was 341.
