= Santo Domingo Yodohino =

Coordinates: 17°37′N 97°41′W

- Municipality and town
- Interactive map of Santo Domingo Yodohino
- Country: Mexico
- State: Oaxaca
- Time zone: UTC-6 (Central Standard Time)

Santo Domingo Yodohino is a town and municipality in Oaxaca in south-western Mexico. The municipality covers an area of km^{2}. It is part of the Huajuapan District in the north of the Mixteca Region.

As of 2005, the municipality had a total population of .
