= Santa Ana Tavela =

- Municipality and town
- Location in Mexico
- Coordinates: 16°39′N 95°55′W
- Country: Mexico
- State: Oaxaca

Area
  - Total: 81.65 km^{2} (31.53 sq mi)
- Elevation: 700 m (2,300 ft)

Population (2020)
  - Total: 848
- Time zone: UTC-6 (Central Standard Time)

Santa Ana Tavela is a town and municipality in Oaxaca in south-western Mexico. It is part of the Yautepec District in the east of the Sierra Sur Region.

== Geography ==
The municipality covers an area of 81.65 km^{2} at a height of 700 meters above sea level. The climate is warm temperate with rainfall during summer autumn, and winds generally blowing from north to south. Trees include pine, oak, Tepehuajes, mahogany, cuchipilin, juniper, mesquite, brasil and pochote. Pitaya, pears, mangoes, avocado, lemon and plum grow in the area. Wild fauna include mountain lion, tiger, coyote, badger, wolf, raccoon, wild cat, deer, boar, lion, ocelots, foxes and raccoons.

== Economy ==
As of 2005, the municipality had 277 households with a total population of 1,012 inhabitants of whom six spoke an indigenous language. The people engage in agriculture {maize, sorghum, peanuts, sesame, beans, coffee and various fruits) and raise cattle, pigs and goats. They hunt and fish for their own consumption. There is some logging of maguey trees.
