= San Francisco Tlapancingo =

- Municipality and town
- Location in Mexico
- Coordinates: 17°29′N 98°16′W
- Country: Mexico
- State: Oaxaca

Area
  - Total: 114.82 km^{2} (44.33 sq mi)

Population (2005)
  - Total: 1,235
- Time zone: UTC-6 (Central Standard Time)

San Francisco Tlapancingo is a town and municipality in Oaxaca in south-western Mexico. The municipality covers an area of 114.82 km^{2}. It is part of the Silacayoapam District in the Mixteca Region.

As of 2005, the municipality had a total population of 1,235.
