= Santa María Sola =

- Municipality and town
- Location in Mexico
- Coordinates: 16°34′N 97°00′W
- Country: Mexico
- State: Oaxaca
- Time zone: UTC-6 (Central Standard Time)

Santa María Sola is a town and municipality in Oaxaca in south-western Mexico. The municipality covers an area of km^{2}. It is part of the Sola de Vega District in the Sierra Sur Region.

As of 2005, the municipality had a total population of .
