= Mixistlán de la Reforma =

- Municipality and town
- Location in Mexico
- Coordinates: 17°10′N 96°05′W
- Country: Mexico
- State: Oaxaca

Area
  - Total: 191.4 km^{2} (73.9 sq mi)

Population (2005)
  - Total: 2,438
- Time zone: UTC-6 (Central Standard Time)

Mixistlán de la Reforma is a town and municipality in Oaxaca in south-western Mexico. The municipality covers an area of 191.4 km^{2}. It is part of the Sierra Mixe district within the Sierra Norte de Oaxaca Region.

As of 2005, the municipality had a total population of 2,438.
