= Taniche =

- Municipality and town
- Location in Mexico
- Coordinates: 16°34′00″N 96°45′13″W
- Country: Mexico
- State: Oaxaca

Area
  - Total: 22.97 km^{2} (8.87 sq mi)
- Time zone: UTC-6 (Central Standard Time)

Taniche is a town and municipality in Oaxaca in south-western Mexico. The municipality covers an area of 22.97 km^{2}. It is part of the Ejutla District in the south of the Valles Centrales Region.

== History ==
This municipality is very important because for many years all the economical activities had something to do with the ranches. In 1778 Manuel Sabino Crespo one of the most important and famous people of the state was born. He fought for the rights of indigenous people and for its liberty. Another important date in this municipality was in 1979 when it was founded the first primary school by Antonio Romero Barragan.

== Geography ==
It is localized in the region of the Central Valleys, that is in the central part of the state. It borders in the north with Ejutla de Crespo, in the south with Ejutla de Crespo, in the east with Ejutla de Crespo and in the west with La Compañia. There is only one river in the town, Río Ejutla, and it is important for the animals and people that live there. The climate in this region is tempered with much rain in some months.

=== Flora and fauna ===
The principal animals in this region are the horses, cows, rams, and domestic animals. Plants of the region include mezquites, gordolobo and hierba buena. The plants and animals are very important for this people because is easiest way to get immediate food.

== Demography ==
Using the information of the census that INEGI made in 2005 there are 739 inhabitants in Taniche. 100% of the population is Catholic. This town has only one primary school, one health care center, two grocery stores and three basketball courts. There are over 206 houses for the people, its principle way of communication is by rural telephones and postcards. A nearby highway brings people from other towns to Taniche, supporting the economy.
