= San Juan Yaeé =

- Municipality and town
- Location in Mexico
- Coordinates: 17°26′N 96°17′W
- Country: Mexico
- State: Oaxaca

Area
  - Total: 93.14 km^{2} (35.96 sq mi)

Population (2005)
  - Total: 1,344
- Time zone: UTC-6 (Central Standard Time)

San Juan Yaeé is a town and municipality in Oaxaca in south-western Mexico. The municipality covers an area of 93.14 km^{2}. It is part of the Villa Alta District in the center of the Sierra Norte Region.

As of 2005, the municipality had a total population of 1,344.
