= Fresnillo de Trujano =

- Municipality and town
- Location in Mexico
- Coordinates: 17°54′N 98°08′W
- Country: Mexico
- State: Oaxaca

Area
  - Total: 98.24 km^{2} (37.93 sq mi)

Population (2005)
  - Total: 852
- Time zone: UTC-6 (Central Standard Time)

Fresnillo de Trujano is a town and municipality in Oaxaca in south-western Mexico. The municipality covers an area of 98.24 km^{2}. It is part of the Huajuapan District north of the Mixteca Region.

As of 2005, the municipality had a total population of 852.
