= San Andrés Solaga =

- Municipality and town
- Location in Mexico
- Coordinates: 17°16′N 96°14′W
- Country: Mexico
- State: Oaxaca

Area
  - Total: 38.27 km^{2} (14.78 sq mi)

Population (2005)
  - Total: 1,699
- Time zone: UTC-6 (Central Standard Time)

San Andrés Solaga is a town and municipality in Oaxaca in south-western Mexico. The municipality covers an area of 38.27 km^{2}. It is part of the Villa Alta District in the center of the Sierra Norte Region.

As of 2005, the municipality had a total population of 1,699.
