= Santiago Lalopa =

Coordinates: 17°25′N 96°15′W

- Municipality and town
- Interactive map of Santiago Lalopa
- Country: Mexico
- State: Oaxaca
- Time zone: UTC-6 (Central Standard Time)

Santiago Lalopa is a town and municipality in Oaxaca in south-western Mexico. The municipality covers an area of km^{2}. It is part of the Villa Alta District in the center of the Sierra Norte Region.

As of 2005, the municipality had a total population of .
