= Santiago Nacaltepec =

- Municipality and town
- Location in Mexico
- Coordinates: 17°31′N 96°56′W
- Country: Mexico
- State: Oaxaca

Area
  - Total: 21,306 km^{2} (8,226 sq mi)

Population (2005)
  - Total: 1,967
  - Density: 9.23/km^{2} (23.9/sq mi)
- Time zone: UTC-6 (Central Standard Time)

Santiago Nacaltepec is a town and municipality in Oaxaca in south-western Mexico. The municipality covers an area of 213,06 km^{2}. It is part of Cuicatlán District in the north of the Cañada Region.

As of 2005, the municipality had a total population of 1,967.
