= Calihualá =

Calihuala
- Municipality and town
- Interactive map of Calihuala
- Country: Mexico
- State: Oaxaca
- Time zone: UTC-06:00 (Central Standard Time)

Calihuala is a town and municipality in Oaxaca in south-western Mexico. The municipality covers an area of km^{2}.

As of 2005, the municipality had a total population of .
