= Magdalena Zahuatlán =

- Municipality and town
- Location in Mexico
- Coordinates: 17°23′N 97°13′W
- Country: Mexico
- State: Oaxaca

Area
  - Total: 70.2 km^{2} (27.1 sq mi)

Population (2005)
  - Total: 422
- Time zone: UTC-6 (Central Standard Time)

Magdalena Zahuatlán is a town and municipality in Oaxaca in south-western Mexico. The municipality covers an area of 70.2 km^{2}. It is part of the Nochixtlán District in the southeast of the Mixteca Region.

As of 2005, the municipality had a total population of 422.
