= San Sebastián Río Hondo =

- Municipality and town
- Location in Mexico
- Coordinates: 16°10′N 96°27′W
- Country: Mexico
- State: Oaxaca
- Time zone: UTC-6 (Central Standard Time)

San Sebastián Río Hondo is a town and municipality in Oaxaca in south-western Mexico. It is part of the Miahuatlán District in the south of the Sierra Sur Region.
