= San Francisco Chapulapa =

- Municipality and town
- Location in Mexico
- Coordinates: 17°56′N 96°45′W
- Country: Mexico
- State: Oaxaca

Area
  - Total: 19.14 km^{2} (7.39 sq mi)

Population (2005)
  - Total: 1,968
- Time zone: UTC-6 (Central Standard Time)

San Francisco Chapulapa is a town and municipality in Oaxaca in south-western Mexico. The municipality covers an area of 19.14 km^{2} (7 sq mi). It is part of Cuicatlán District in the north of the Cañada Region.

As of 2005, the municipality had a total population of 1,968.
