= Magdalena Yodocono de Porfirio Díaz =

- Municipality and town
- Location in Mexico
- Country: Mexico
- State: Oaxaca
- Time zone: UTC-6 (Central Standard Time)

Magdalena Yodocono de Porfirio Díaz is a town and municipality in Oaxaca in south-western Mexico. The municipality covers an area of km^{2}. It is part of the Nochixtlán District in the southeast of the Mixteca Region.

As of 2020, the municipality had a total population of 1,682 inhabitants.
