= Magdalena Tlacotepec =

- Municipality and town
- Location in Mexico
- Coordinates: 16°30′N 95°12′W
- Country: Mexico
- State: Oaxaca

Area
  - Total: 234.75 km^{2} (90.64 sq mi)

Population (2005)
  - Total: 1,165
- Time zone: UTC-6 (Central Standard Time)

Magdalena Tlacotepec is a town and municipality in Oaxaca in south-western Mexico. The municipality covers an area of 234.75 km^{2}. It is part of the Tehuantepec District in the west of the Istmo Region.

In 2005, the municipality had a total population of 1,165.
