= Municipalities of Oaxaca =

List of municipalities of Mexican state

Map of Mexico with Oaxaca highlighted

Regions and districts of Oaxaca

Oaxaca is a state in southern Mexico that is divided into 570 municipalities, more than any other state in Mexico. According to Article 113 of the state's constitution, the municipalities are grouped into 30 judicial and tax districts to facilitate the distribution of the state's revenues. It is the only state in Mexico with this particular judicial and tax district organization. Oaxaca is the tenth most populated state with 4,132,148 inhabitants as of the 2020 INEGI census and the fifth largest by land area spanning 93,757.6 square kilometres (36,200.0 sq mi).

Municipalities in Oaxaca have some administrative autonomy from the state according to the 115th article of the 1917 Constitution of Mexico. Every three years, citizens elect a municipal president (Spanish: presidente municipal) by a plurality voting system who heads a concurrently elected municipal council (ayuntamiento) responsible for providing all the public services for their constituents. The municipal council consists of a variable number of trustees and councillors (regidores y síndicos). Municipalities are responsible for public services (such as water and sewerage), street lighting, public safety, traffic, and the maintenance of public parks, gardens and cemeteries. They may also assist the state and federal governments in education, emergency fire and medical services, environmental protection and maintenance of monuments and historical landmarks. Since 1984, they have had the power to collect property taxes and user fees, although more funds are obtained from the state and federal governments than from their own income.

The largest municipality by population as of the 2020 census is Oaxaca de Juárez, seat of the state capital, with 270,955 residents (6.55% of the state's total), while the smallest is Santa Magdalena Jicotlán with 81 residents, the least populated municipality in Mexico. The largest municipality by land area is Santa María Chimalapa which spans 4,547.10 km^{2} (1,755.65 sq mi), and the smallest is Natividad with 2.20 km^{2} (0.85 sq mi), also the smallest municipality by area in Mexico. The newest municipality is Chahuites, established in 1949.

== Municipalities ==
Largest municipalities in Oaxaca by population

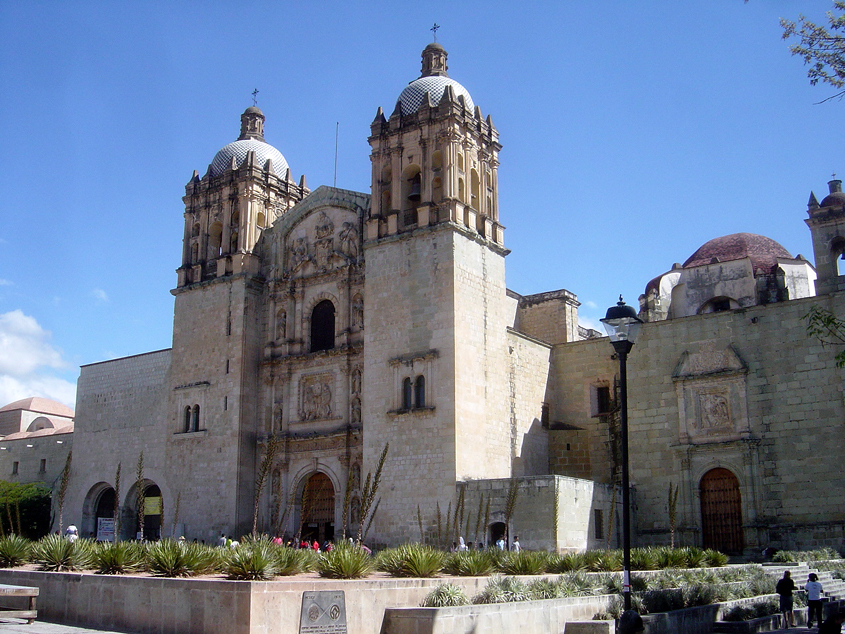
Oaxaca is the capital and largest municipality by population in Oaxaca.

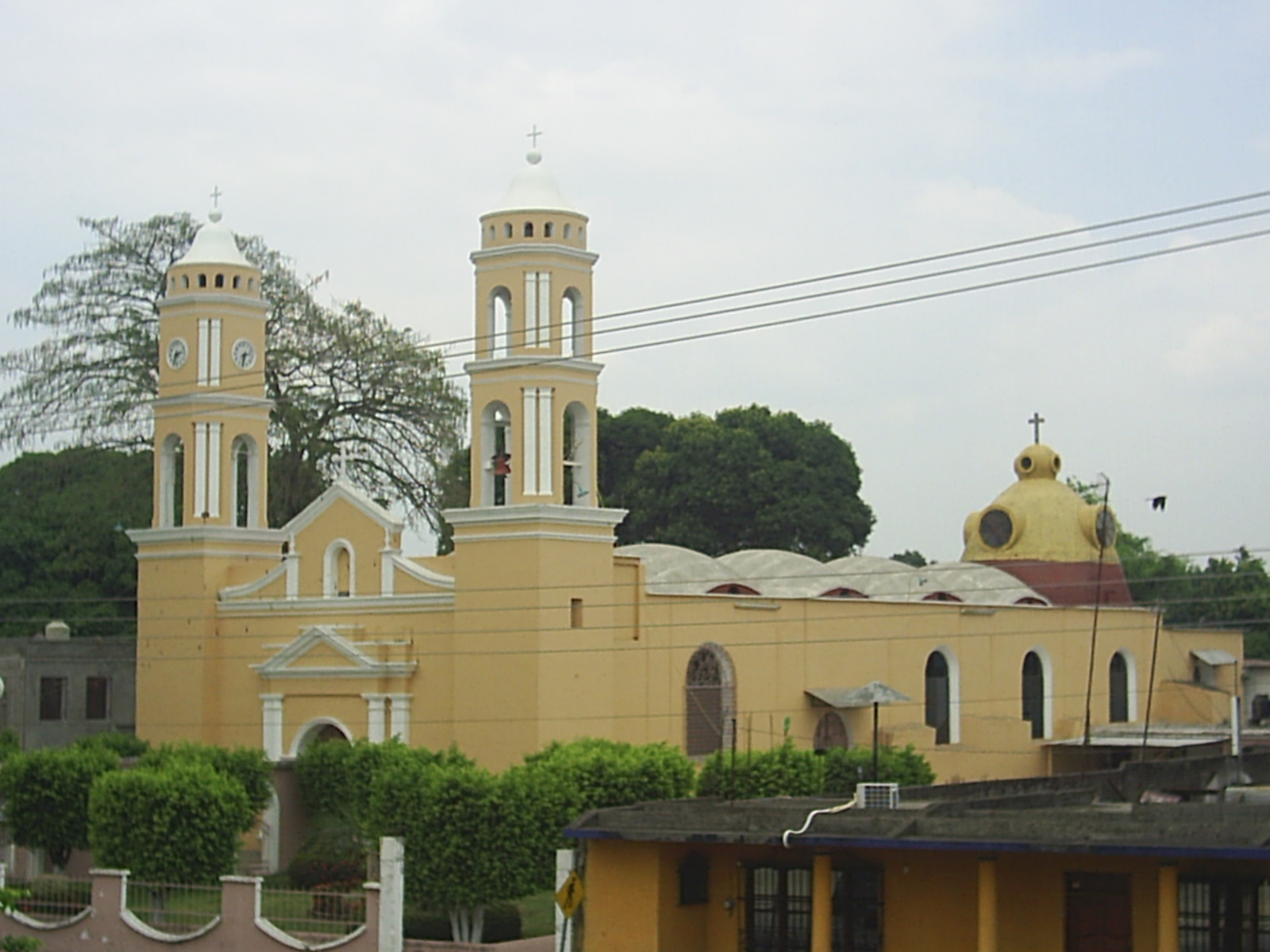
San Juan Bautista Tuxtepec is the second largest municipality by population.

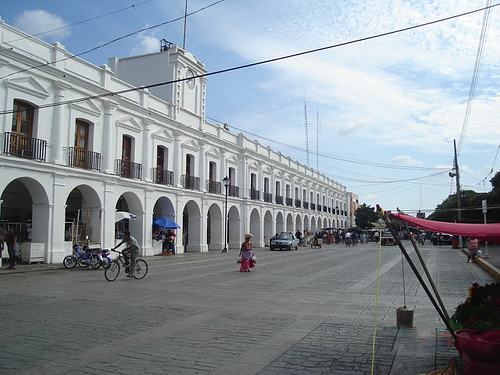
The third largest municipality by population in Oaxaca is Juchitán.

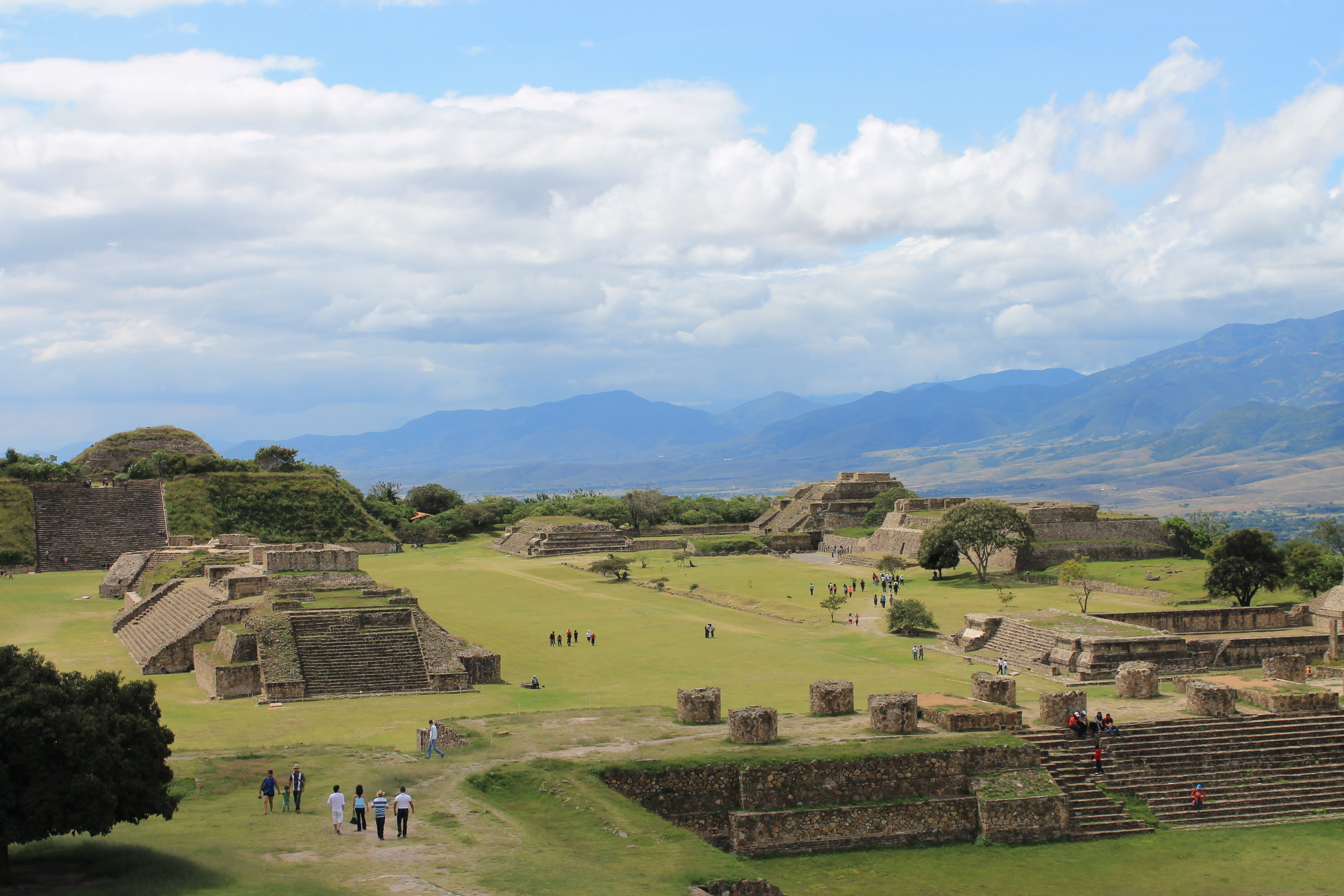
Santa Cruz Xoxocotlán is the fourth largest municipality by population.

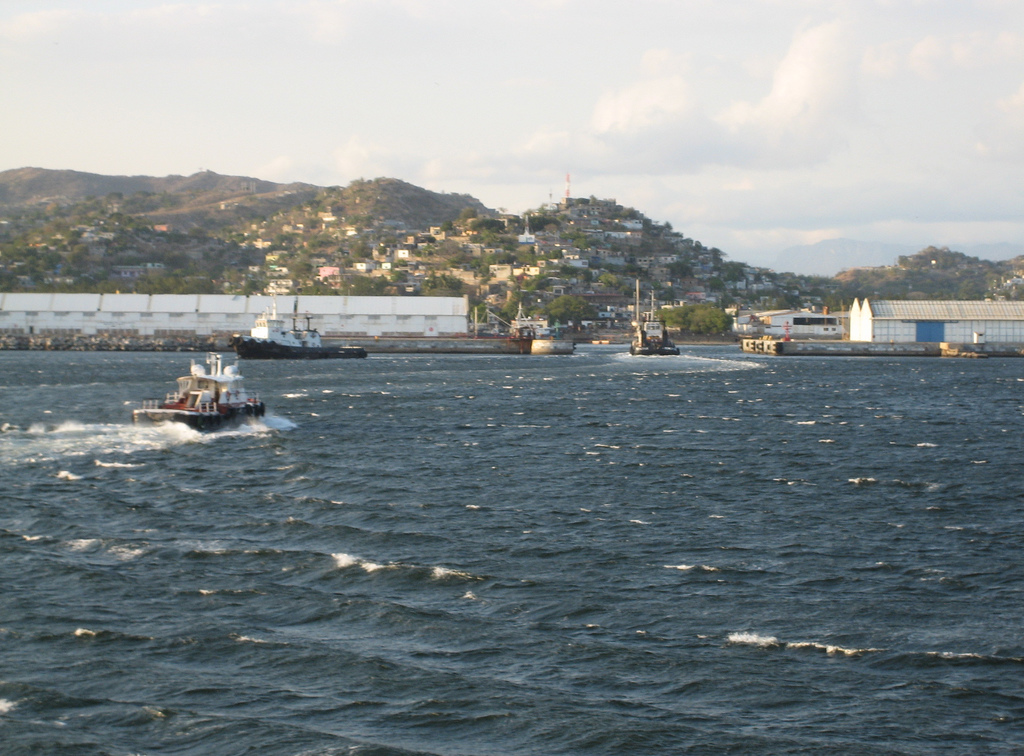
The fifth largest municipality in Oaxaca is Salina Cruz.

† State capital

Municipalities of Oaxaca
Name	Municipal seat	District	Population (2020)	Population (2010)	Change	Land area		Population density (2020)	Incorporation date
Name	Municipal seat	District	Population (2020)	Population (2010)	Change	km^{2}	sq mi	Population density (2020)	Incorporation date
Abejones	Abejones	Ixtlán	841	1,084	−22.4%	126.4	48.8	6.7/km^{2} (17.2/sq mi)	March 15, 1825
Acatlán	Acatlán de Pérez Figueroa	Tuxtepec	45,167	44,885	+0.6%	754.6	291.4	59.9/km^{2} (155.0/sq mi)	October 25, 1904
Ánimas Trujano	Ánimas Trujano	Centro	4,564	3,759	+21.4%	3.0	1.2	1,521.3/km^{2} (3,940.2/sq mi)	February 4, 1868
Asunción Cacalotepec	Asunción Cacalotepec	Mixe	2,547	2,495	+2.1%	76.3	29.5	33.4/km^{2} (86.5/sq mi)	March 15, 1825
Asunción Cuyotepeji	Asunción Cuyotepeji	Huajuapan	1,107	1,012	+9.4%	83.7	32.3	13.2/km^{2} (34.3/sq mi)	May 6, 1826
Asunción Ixtaltepec	Asunción Ixtaltepec	Juchitán	15,261	14,751	+3.5%	658.9	254.4	23.2/km^{2} (60.0/sq mi)	March 15, 1825
Asunción Nochixtlán	Asunción Nochixtlán	Nochixtlán	20,464	17,820	+14.8%	343.4	132.6	59.6/km^{2} (154.3/sq mi)	July 28, 1823
Asunción Ocotlán	Asunción Ocotlán	Ocotlán	2,395	2,612	−8.3%	4.5	1.7	532.2/km^{2} (1,378.4/sq mi)	March 15, 1825
Asunción Tlacolulita	Asunción Tlacolulita	Yautepec	734	842	−12.8%	189.9	73.3	3.9/km^{2} (10.0/sq mi)	March 15, 1825
Ayoquezco	Ayoquezco de Aldama	Zimatlán	4,874	4,406	+10.6%	104.4	40.3	46.7/km^{2} (120.9/sq mi)	March 15, 1825
Ayotzintepec	Ayotzintepec	Tuxtepec	6,857	6,720	+2.0%	157.5	60.8	43.5/km^{2} (112.8/sq mi)	June 27, 1942
Calihualá	Calihualá	Silacayoápam	1,402	1,220	+14.9%	67.7	26.1	20.7/km^{2} (53.6/sq mi)	May 6, 1826
Candelaria Loxicha	Candelaria Loxicha	Pochutla	11,166	9,860	+13.2%	181.0	69.9	61.7/km^{2} (159.8/sq mi)	December 7, 1881
Capulálpam	Capulálpam de Méndez	Ixtlán	1,619	1,467	+10.4%	37.2	14.4	43.5/km^{2} (112.7/sq mi)	March 15, 1825
Chahuites	Chahuites	Juchitán	11,356	11,105	+2.3%	22.7	8.8	500.3/km^{2} (1,295.7/sq mi)	January 15, 1949
Chalcatongo	Chalcatongo de Hidalgo	Tlaxiaco	9,035	8,481	+6.5%	133.3	51.5	67.8/km^{2} (175.5/sq mi)	March 15, 1825
Chiquihuitlán	Chiquihuitlán de Benito Juárez	Cuicatlán	2,179	2,458	−11.4%	36.0	13.9	60.5/km^{2} (156.8/sq mi)	March 15, 1825
Ciénega de Zimatlán	Ciénega de Zimatlán	Zimatlán	3,043	2,785	+9.3%	10.3	4.0	295.4/km^{2} (765.2/sq mi)	November 18, 1844
Coatecas Altas	Coatecas Altas	Ejutla	5,356	4,712	+13.7%	119.4	46.1	44.9/km^{2} (116.2/sq mi)	March 15, 1825
Coicoyán de las Flores	Coicoyán de las Flores	Juxtlahuaca	9,563	8,531	+12.1%	126.1	48.7	75.8/km^{2} (196.4/sq mi)	March 15, 1825
Concepción Buenavista	Concepción Buenavista	Coixtlahuaca	752	834	−9.8%	224.6	86.7	3.3/km^{2} (8.7/sq mi)	March 15, 1825
Concepción Pápalo	Concepción Pápalo	Cuicatlán	2,754	3,071	−10.3%	173.6	67.0	15.9/km^{2} (41.1/sq mi)	March 15, 1825
Constancia del Rosario	Constancia del Rosario	Putla	4,847	3,860	+25.6%	57.2	22.1	84.7/km^{2} (219.5/sq mi)	October 23, 1891
Cosolapa	Cosolapa	Tuxtepec	14,488	14,667	−1.2%	112.1	43.3	129.2/km^{2} (334.7/sq mi)	July 4, 1936
Cosoltepec (Note: Cosoltepec was originally incorporated as Santa Gertrudis, changing its name on December 11, 1937.)	Cosoltepec	Huajuapan	803	866	−7.3%	111.7	43.1	7.2/km^{2} (18.6/sq mi)	May 6, 1826
Cuilápam	Cuilápam de Guerrero	Centro	26,882	18,428	+45.9%	49.8	19.2	539.8/km^{2} (1,398.1/sq mi)	March 15, 1825
Cuyamecalco Villa de Zaragoza (Note: Cuyamecalco Villa de Zaragoza was originally incorporated as Santa María Yolomecalco, changing its name on May 6, 1826.)	Cuyamecalco Villa de Zaragoza	Cuicatlán	3,644	3,846	−5.3%	79.1	30.5	46.1/km^{2} (119.3/sq mi)	March 15, 1825
Ejutla	Ejutla de Crespo	Ejutla	23,148	19,679	+17.6%	317.5	122.6	72.9/km^{2} (188.8/sq mi)	March 15, 1825
El Barrio de la Soledad	El Barrio de la Soledad	Juchitán	13,474	13,608	−1.0%	252.1	97.3	53.4/km^{2} (138.4/sq mi)	March 15, 1825
El Espinal	El Espinal	Juchitán	8,730	8,310	+5.1%	56.1	21.7	155.6/km^{2} (403.0/sq mi)	March 15, 1825
Eloxochitlán	Eloxochitlán	Teotitlán	4,215	4,263	−1.1%	35.8	13.8	117.7/km^{2} (304.9/sq mi)	March 15, 1825
Fresnillo de Trujano	Fresnillo de Trujano	Huajuapan	1,077	1,033	+4.3%	61.3	23.7	17.6/km^{2} (45.5/sq mi)	October 16, 1937
Guadalupe de Ramírez	Guadalupe de Ramírez	Silacayoápam	1,288	1,425	−9.6%	30.8	11.9	41.8/km^{2} (108.3/sq mi)	December 7, 1886
Guadalupe Etla	Guadalupe Etla	Etla	2,929	2,433	+20.4%	4.3	1.7	681.2/km^{2} (1,764.2/sq mi)	March 15, 1825
Guelatao de Juárez	San Pablo Guelatao	Ixtlán	657	544	+20.8%	4.5	1.7	146.0/km^{2} (378.1/sq mi)	September 30, 1939
Guevea	Guevea de Humboldt	Tehuantepec	5,256	5,285	−0.5%	280.9	108.5	18.7/km^{2} (48.5/sq mi)	March 15, 1825
Huajuapan de León	Huajuapan de León	Huajuapan	78,313	69,839	+12.1%	325.8	125.8	240.4/km^{2} (622.6/sq mi)	July 28, 1823
Huautepec	Huautepec	Teotitlán	6,385	5,995	+6.5%	47.0	18.1	135.9/km^{2} (351.9/sq mi)	March 15, 1825
Huautla	Huautla de Jiménez	Teotitlán	31,710	30,004	+5.7%	148.0	57.1	214.3/km^{2} (554.9/sq mi)	March 15, 1825
Ixpantepec Nieves	Ixpantepec Nieves	Silacayoápam	1,079	1,182	−8.7%	72.5	28.0	14.9/km^{2} (38.5/sq mi)	May 6, 1826
Ixtepec (Note: Ixtepec was originally incorporated as San Gerónimo, changing its name on April 20, 1935.)	Ciudad Ixtepec	Juchitán	28,082	26,450	+6.2%	294.1	113.6	95.5/km^{2} (247.3/sq mi)	March 15, 1825
Ixtlán	Ixtlán de Juárez	Ixtlán	8,385	7,674	+9.3%	562.3	217.1	14.9/km^{2} (38.6/sq mi)	March 15, 1825
Juchitán	Juchitán de Zaragoza	Juchitán	113,570	93,038	+22.1%	911.3	351.9	124.6/km^{2} (322.8/sq mi)	March 15, 1825
La Compañía	La Compañía	Ejutla	3,607	3,302	+9.2%	104.2	40.2	34.6/km^{2} (89.7/sq mi)	October 23, 1891
La Pe	La Pe	Ejutla	3,052	2,446	+24.8%	26.9	10.4	113.5/km^{2} (293.9/sq mi)	October 23, 1891
La Reforma (Note: La Reforma was originally incorporated as Rancho del Zapote, changing its name on May 12, 1921.)	La Reforma	Putla	3,411	3,331	+2.4%	186.6	72.0	18.3/km^{2} (47.3/sq mi)	October 23, 1891
La Trinidad Vista Hermosa (Note: La Trinidad Vista Hermosa was originally incorporated as La Trinidad de Teotongo, changing its name on October 23, 1891.)	La Trinidad Vista Hermosa	Teposcolula	306	249	+22.9%	10.8	4.2	28.3/km^{2} (73.4/sq mi)	March 19, 1868
Loma Bonita	Loma Bonita	Tuxtepec	40,934	41,535	−1.4%	485.8	187.6	84.3/km^{2} (218.2/sq mi)	December 4, 1937
Magdalena Apasco	Magdalena Apasco	Etla	7,888	7,522	+4.9%	27.0	10.4	292.1/km^{2} (756.7/sq mi)	March 15, 1825
Magdalena Jaltepec	Magdalena Jaltepec	Nochixtlán	2,943	3,313	−11.2%	234.7	90.6	12.5/km^{2} (32.5/sq mi)	March 15, 1825
Magdalena Mixtepec	Magdalena Mixtepec	Zimatlán	1,433	1,304	+9.9%	41.0	15.8	35.0/km^{2} (90.5/sq mi)	March 15, 1825
Magdalena Ocotlán	Magdalena Ocotlán	Ocotlán	1,184	1,141	+3.8%	10.3	4.0	115.0/km^{2} (297.7/sq mi)	March 15, 1825
Magdalena Peñasco (Note: Magdalena Peñasco was originally incorporated as Magdalena Tlacotocapan, changing its name on November 18, 1844.)	Magdalena Peñasco	Tlaxiaco	3,750	3,778	−0.7%	85.1	32.9	44.1/km^{2} (114.1/sq mi)	March 15, 1825
Magdalena Teitipac	Magdalena Teitipac	Tlacolula	4,764	4,368	+9.1%	39.4	15.2	120.9/km^{2} (313.2/sq mi)	March 15, 1825
Magdalena Tequisistlán	Magdalena Tequisistlán	Tehuantepec	5,996	6,182	−3.0%	840.6	324.6	7.1/km^{2} (18.5/sq mi)	March 15, 1825
Magdalena Tlacotepec	Magdalena Tlacotepec	Tehuantepec	1,297	1,221	+6.2%	124.4	48.0	10.4/km^{2} (27.0/sq mi)	March 15, 1825
Magdalena Yodocono	Magdalena Yodocono de Porfirio Díaz	Nochixtlán	1,682	1,458	+15.4%	39.0	15.1	43.1/km^{2} (111.7/sq mi)	November 18, 1844
Magdalena Zahuatlán	Magdalena Zahuatlán	Nochixtlán	404	409	−1.2%	24.8	9.6	16.3/km^{2} (42.2/sq mi)	March 15, 1825
Mariscala (Note: Mariscala was originally incorporated as Iturbide, changing its name on June 2, 1961.)	Mariscala de Juárez	Huajuapan	3,739	3,530	+5.9%	144.2	55.7	25.9/km^{2} (67.2/sq mi)	May 15, 1857
Mártires de Tacubaya	Mártires de Tacubaya	Jamiltepec	1,446	1,451	−0.3%	57.5	22.2	25.1/km^{2} (65.1/sq mi)	November 16, 1912
Matías Romero Avendaño	Matías Romero	Juchitán	38,183	38,019	+0.4%	1,355.4	523.3	28.2/km^{2} (73.0/sq mi)	November 9, 1906
Mazatlán Villa de Flores	Mazatlán Villa de Flores	Teotitlán	12,722	13,435	−5.3%	182.2	70.3	69.8/km^{2} (180.8/sq mi)	March 15, 1825
Mesones Hidalgo	Mesones Hidalgo	Putla	4,424	4,402	+0.5%	174.7	67.5	25.3/km^{2} (65.6/sq mi)	October 23, 1891
Miahuatlán	Miahuatlán de Porfirio Díaz	Miahuatlán	50,375	41,387	+21.7%	467.4	180.5	107.8/km^{2} (279.1/sq mi)	July 28, 1823
Mixistlán de la Reforma	Mixistlán de la Reforma	Mixe	2,487	2,770	−10.2%	67.7	26.1	36.7/km^{2} (95.1/sq mi)	March 15, 1825
Monjas	Monjas	Miahuatlán	2,893	2,568	+12.7%	22.4	8.6	129.2/km^{2} (334.5/sq mi)	October 23, 1891
Natividad	Natividad	Ixtlán	498	586	−15.0%	2.2	0.8	226.4/km^{2} (586.3/sq mi)	May 27, 1939
Nazareno Etla	Nazareno Etla	Etla	4,293	3,882	+10.6%	4.3	1.7	998.4/km^{2} (2,585.8/sq mi)	March 15, 1825
Nejapa	Nejapa de Madero	Yautepec	8,494	7,390	+14.9%	504.4	194.7	16.8/km^{2} (43.6/sq mi)	March 15, 1825
Nuevo Zoquiápam	Nuevo Zoquiápam	Ixtlán	1,590	1,652	−3.8%	100.7	38.9	15.8/km^{2} (40.9/sq mi)	March 15, 1825
Oaxaca	Oaxaca de Juárez†	Centro	270,955	263,357	+2.9%	89.5	34.6	3,027.4/km^{2} (7,841.0/sq mi)	July 28, 1823
Ocotlán	Ocotlán de Morelos	Ocotlán	23,751	21,341	+11.3%	119.5	46.1	198.8/km^{2} (514.8/sq mi)	March 15, 1825
Pinotepa de Don Luis	Pinotepa de Don Luis	Jamiltepec	6,416	6,629	−3.2%	67.4	26.0	95.2/km^{2} (246.5/sq mi)	May 6, 1826
Pluma Hidalgo	Pluma Hidalgo	Pochutla	3,255	3,060	+6.4%	103.2	39.8	31.5/km^{2} (81.7/sq mi)	December 1, 1880
Putla	Putla Villa de Guerrero	Putla	34,652	31,897	+8.6%	406.8	157.1	85.2/km^{2} (220.6/sq mi)	May 6, 1826
Reforma de Pineda	Reforma de Pineda	Juchitán	2,660	2,671	−0.4%	33.4	12.9	79.6/km^{2} (206.3/sq mi)	December 25, 1926
Reyes Etla	Reyes Etla	Etla	4,370	3,568	+22.5%	12.0	4.6	364.2/km^{2} (943.2/sq mi)	March 15, 1825
Rojas de Cuauhtémoc	Rojas de Cuauhtémoc	Tlacolula	1,301	1,092	+19.1%	12.5	4.8	104.1/km^{2} (269.6/sq mi)	October 23, 1891
Salina Cruz	Salina Cruz	Tehuantepec	84,438	82,371	+2.5%	131.9	50.9	640.2/km^{2} (1,658.0/sq mi)	1901
San Agustín Amatengo	San Agustín Amatengo	Ejutla	1,593	1,312	+21.4%	55.6	21.5	28.7/km^{2} (74.2/sq mi)	March 15, 1825
San Agustín Atenango	San Agustín Atenango	Silacayoápam	1,871	1,914	−2.2%	96.5	37.3	19.4/km^{2} (50.2/sq mi)	May 6, 1826
San Agustín Chayuco	San Agustín Chayuco	Jamiltepec	4,163	3,952	+5.3%	151.0	58.3	27.6/km^{2} (71.4/sq mi)	May 6, 1826
San Agustín de las Juntas	San Agustín de las Juntas	Centro	11,391	8,089	+40.8%	26.0	10.0	438.1/km^{2} (1,134.7/sq mi)	March 15, 1825
San Agustín Etla	San Agustín Etla	Etla	4,168	3,893	+7.1%	55.1	21.3	75.6/km^{2} (195.9/sq mi)	March 15, 1825
San Agustín Loxicha	San Agustín Loxicha	Pochutla	26,194	22,565	+16.1%	335.7	129.6	78.0/km^{2} (202.1/sq mi)	March 15, 1825
San Agustín Tlacotepec	San Agustín Tlacotepec	Tlaxiaco	1,032	874	+18.1%	51.4	19.8	20.1/km^{2} (52.0/sq mi)	March 15, 1825
San Agustín Yatareni	San Agustín Yatareni	Centro	5,521	4,075	+35.5%	6.4	2.5	862.7/km^{2} (2,234.3/sq mi)	March 15, 1825
San Andrés Cabecera Nueva	San Andrés Cabecera Nueva	Putla	2,881	2,851	+1.1%	260.7	100.7	11.1/km^{2} (28.6/sq mi)	October 23, 1891
San Andrés Dinicuiti	San Andrés Dinicuiti	Huajuapan	2,308	2,152	+7.2%	99.3	38.3	23.2/km^{2} (60.2/sq mi)	May 6, 1826
San Andrés Huaxpaltepec	San Andrés Huaxpaltepec	Jamiltepec	6,234	5,867	+6.3%	87.6	33.8	71.2/km^{2} (184.3/sq mi)	May 6, 1826
San Andrés Huayápam	San Andrés Huayápam	Centro	6,279	4,879	+28.7%	27.6	10.7	227.5/km^{2} (589.2/sq mi)	March 15, 1825
San Andrés Ixtlahuaca	San Andrés Ixtlahuaca	Centro	1,776	1,439	+23.4%	28.8	11.1	61.7/km^{2} (159.7/sq mi)	March 15, 1825
San Andrés Lagunas	San Andrés Lagunas	Teposcolula	518	505	+2.6%	50.0	19.3	10.4/km^{2} (26.8/sq mi)	March 15, 1825
San Andrés Nuxiño	San Andrés Nuxiño	Nochixtlán	1,850	1,898	−2.5%	64.0	24.7	28.9/km^{2} (74.9/sq mi)	March 15, 1825
San Andrés Paxtlán	San Andrés Paxtlán	Miahuatlán	4,562	3,990	+14.3%	57.1	22.0	79.9/km^{2} (206.9/sq mi)	March 15, 1825
San Andrés Sinaxtla	San Andrés Sinaxtla	Nochixtlán	756	772	−2.1%	22.6	8.7	33.5/km^{2} (86.6/sq mi)	March 15, 1825
San Andrés Solaga	San Andrés Solaga	Villa Alta	1,771	1,740	+1.8%	48.6	18.8	36.4/km^{2} (94.4/sq mi)	March 15, 1825
San Andrés Teotilálpam	San Andrés Teotilálpam	Cuicatlán	4,233	4,427	−4.4%	145.5	56.2	29.1/km^{2} (75.3/sq mi)	March 15, 1825
San Andrés Tepetlapa	San Andrés Tepetlapa	Silacayoápam	381	475	−19.8%	14.4	5.6	26.5/km^{2} (68.5/sq mi)	May 6, 1826
San Andrés Yaá	San Andrés Yaá	Villa Alta	393	497	−20.9%	40.9	15.8	9.6/km^{2} (24.9/sq mi)	March 15, 1825
San Andrés Zabache	San Andrés Zabache	Ejutla	748	726	+3.0%	7.1	2.7	105.4/km^{2} (272.9/sq mi)	March 15, 1825
San Andrés Zautla	San Andrés Zautla	Etla	5,326	4,405	+20.9%	69.4	26.8	76.7/km^{2} (198.8/sq mi)	March 15, 1825
San Antonino Castillo Velasco	San Antonino Castillo Velasco	Ocotlán	6,064	5,651	+7.3%	11.3	4.4	536.6/km^{2} (1,389.9/sq mi)	March 15, 1825
San Antonino el Alto	San Antonino el Alto	Zimatlán	2,705	2,508	+7.9%	105.3	40.7	25.7/km^{2} (66.5/sq mi)	March 15, 1825
San Antonino Monte Verde	San Antonino Monte Verde	Teposcolula	7,678	6,650	+15.5%	109.7	42.4	70.0/km^{2} (181.3/sq mi)	March 15, 1825
San Antonio Acutla	San Antonio Acutla	Teposcolula	249	297	−16.2%	16.5	6.4	15.1/km^{2} (39.1/sq mi)	March 15, 1825
San Antonio de la Cal (Note: San Antonio de la Cal was originally incorporated as San Antonio Abad, changing its name on May 6, 1826.)	San Antonio de la Cal	Centro	26,282	21,456	+22.5%	11.0	4.2	2,389.3/km^{2} (6,188.2/sq mi)	March 15, 1825
San Antonio Huitepec (Note: San Antonio Huitepec was originally incorporated as Santa María Isitepec, changing its name on July 5, 1941.)	San Antonio Huitepec	Zaachila	2,936	4,289	−31.5%	191.4	73.9	15.3/km^{2} (39.7/sq mi)	March 15, 1825
San Antonio Nanahuatípam	San Antonio Nanahuatípam	Teotitlán	1,232	1,233	−0.1%	77.2	29.8	16.0/km^{2} (41.3/sq mi)	November 18, 1844
San Antonio Sinicahua	San Antonio Sinicahua	Tlaxiaco	1,668	1,603	+4.1%	29.2	11.3	57.1/km^{2} (147.9/sq mi)	March 15, 1825
San Antonio Tepetlapa	San Antonio Tepetlapa	Jamiltepec	4,873	4,394	+10.9%	69.4	26.8	70.2/km^{2} (181.9/sq mi)	November 18, 1844
San Baltazar Chichicápam	San Baltazar Chichicápam	Ocotlán	2,576	2,439	+5.6%	92.2	35.6	27.9/km^{2} (72.4/sq mi)	March 15, 1825
San Baltazar Loxicha	San Baltazar Loxicha	Pochutla	3,169	2,832	+11.9%	120.9	46.7	26.2/km^{2} (67.9/sq mi)	March 15, 1825
San Baltazar Yatzachi el Bajo	San Baltazar Yatzachi el Bajo	Villa Alta	674	677	−0.4%	30.3	11.7	22.2/km^{2} (57.6/sq mi)	March 15, 1825
San Bartolo Coyotepec	San Bartolo Coyotepec	Centro	10,391	8,684	+19.7%	31.4	12.1	330.9/km^{2} (857.1/sq mi)	March 15, 1825
San Bartolo Soyaltepec	San Bartolo Soyaltepec	Teposcolula	596	655	−9.0%	74.9	28.9	8.0/km^{2} (20.6/sq mi)	March 15, 1825
San Bartolo Yautepec	San Bartolo Yautepec	Yautepec	653	677	−3.5%	93.4	36.1	7.0/km^{2} (18.1/sq mi)	March 15, 1825
San Bartolomé Ayautla	San Bartolomé Ayautla	Teotitlán	4,131	4,052	+1.9%	57.4	22.2	72.0/km^{2} (186.4/sq mi)	March 15, 1825
San Bartolomé Loxicha	San Bartolomé Loxicha	Pochutla	2,213	2,422	−8.6%	156.2	60.3	14.2/km^{2} (36.7/sq mi)	March 15, 1825
San Bartolomé Quialana	San Bartolomé Quialana	Tlacolula	2,389	2,470	−3.3%	23.9	9.2	100.0/km^{2} (258.9/sq mi)	March 15, 1825
San Bartolomé Yucuañe	San Bartolomé Yucuañe	Tlaxiaco	735	399	+84.2%	85.9	33.2	8.6/km^{2} (22.2/sq mi)	March 15, 1825
San Bartolomé Zoogocho	San Bartolomé Zoogocho	Villa Alta	449	368	+22.0%	8.7	3.4	51.6/km^{2} (133.7/sq mi)	March 15, 1825
San Bernardo Mixtepec	San Bernardo Mixtepec	Zimatlán	2,829	2,705	+4.6%	108.7	42.0	26.0/km^{2} (67.4/sq mi)	March 15, 1825
San Blas Atempa	San Blas Atempa	Tehuantepec	19,696	17,094	+15.2%	208.3	80.4	94.6/km^{2} (244.9/sq mi)	October 19, 1868
San Carlos Yautepec (Note: San Carlos Yautepec was originally incorporated as San Carlos Corral de Piedras, changing its name on January 31, 1918.)	San Carlos Yautepec	Yautepec	11,662	11,813	−1.3%	2,304.6	889.8	5.1/km^{2} (13.1/sq mi)	March 15, 1825
San Cristóbal Amatlán	San Cristóbal Amatlán	Miahuatlán	5,396	5,024	+7.4%	136.8	52.8	39.4/km^{2} (102.2/sq mi)	March 15, 1825
San Cristóbal Amoltepec	San Cristóbal Amoltepec	Tlaxiaco	1,252	1,283	−2.4%	31.8	12.3	39.4/km^{2} (102.0/sq mi)	March 15, 1825
San Cristóbal Lachirioag	San Cristóbal Lachirioag	Villa Alta	1,342	1,230	+9.1%	16.8	6.5	79.9/km^{2} (206.9/sq mi)	March 15, 1825
San Cristóbal Suchixtlahuaca	San Cristóbal Suchixtlahuaca	Coixtlahuaca	356	334	+6.6%	53.1	20.5	6.7/km^{2} (17.4/sq mi)	March 15, 1825
San Dionisio del Mar	San Dionisio del Mar	Juchitán	5,180	5,098	+1.6%	354.9	137.0	14.6/km^{2} (37.8/sq mi)	March 15, 1825
San Dionisio Ocotepec	San Dionisio Ocotepec	Tlacolula	11,411	10,500	+8.7%	310.4	119.8	36.8/km^{2} (95.2/sq mi)	March 15, 1825
San Dionisio Ocotlán	San Dionisio Ocotlán	Ocotlán	1,380	1,245	+10.8%	10.1	3.9	136.6/km^{2} (353.9/sq mi)	March 15, 1825
San Esteban Atatlahuca	San Esteban Atatlahuca	Tlaxiaco	3,934	3,974	−1.0%	109.2	42.2	36.0/km^{2} (93.3/sq mi)	March 15, 1825
San Felipe Jalapa	San Felipe Jalapa de Díaz	Tuxtepec	28,500	26,838	+6.2%	134.5	51.9	211.9/km^{2} (548.8/sq mi)	March 15, 1825
San Felipe Tejalápam (Note: San Felipe Tejalápam was originally incorporated as San Felipe Zautla, changing its name on May 6, 1826.)	San Felipe Tejalápam	Etla	8,231	7,187	+14.5%	99.4	38.4	82.8/km^{2} (214.5/sq mi)	March 15, 1825
San Felipe Usila	San Felipe Usila	Tuxtepec	12,191	11,575	+5.3%	447.5	172.8	27.2/km^{2} (70.6/sq mi)	March 15, 1825
San Francisco Cahuacuá	San Francisco Cahuacuá	Sola de Vega	3,450	3,427	+0.7%	280.3	108.2	12.3/km^{2} (31.9/sq mi)	March 15, 1825
San Francisco Cajonos	San Francisco Cajonos	Villa Alta	451	460	−2.0%	44.7	17.3	10.1/km^{2} (26.1/sq mi)	March 15, 1825
San Francisco Chapulapa	San Francisco Chapulapa	Cuicatlán	2,195	2,136	+2.8%	62.5	24.1	35.1/km^{2} (91.0/sq mi)	March 15, 1825
San Francisco Chindúa (Note: San Francisco Chindúa was originally incorporated as San Francisco Tlacasahualtongo, changing its name on May 6, 1826. It was merged with Magadalena Yodocono from 1938 to 1939.)	San Francisco Chindúa	Nochixtlán	812	827	−1.8%	22.6	8.7	35.9/km^{2} (93.1/sq mi)	March 15, 1825
San Francisco del Mar	San Francisco del Mar	Juchitán	8,710	7,232	+20.4%	678.1	261.8	12.8/km^{2} (33.3/sq mi)	March 15, 1825
San Francisco Huehuetlán	San Francisco Huehuetlán	Teotitlán	842	1,160	−27.4%	14.3	5.5	58.9/km^{2} (152.5/sq mi)	March 15, 1825
San Francisco Ixhuatán	San Francisco Ixhuatán	Juchitán	9,461	8,959	+5.6%	212.6	82.1	44.5/km^{2} (115.3/sq mi)	October 23, 1891
San Francisco Jaltepetongo	San Francisco Jaltepetongo	Nochixtlán	1,075	1,110	−3.2%	47.4	18.3	22.7/km^{2} (58.7/sq mi)	March 15, 1825
San Francisco Lachigoló	San Francisco Lachigoló	Tlacolula	5,215	3,474	+50.1%	11.5	4.4	453.5/km^{2} (1,174.5/sq mi)	March 15, 1825
San Francisco Logueche	San Francisco Logueche	Miahuatlán	2,803	2,666	+5.1%	40.8	15.8	68.7/km^{2} (177.9/sq mi)	March 15, 1825
San Francisco Nuxaño	San Francisco Nuxaño	Nochixtlán	376	378	−0.5%	22.6	8.7	16.6/km^{2} (43.1/sq mi)	March 15, 1825
San Francisco Ozolotepec	San Francisco Ozolotepec	Miahuatlán	2,182	1,945	+12.2%	49.5	19.1	44.1/km^{2} (114.2/sq mi)	March 15, 1825
San Francisco Sola	San Francisco Sola	Sola de Vega	2,019	1,509	+33.8%	107.0	41.3	18.9/km^{2} (48.9/sq mi)	March 15, 1825
San Francisco Telixtlahuaca (Note: San Francisco Telixtlahuaca was originally incorporated as San Francisco Huizo, changing its name on May 6, 1826.)	San Francisco Telixtlahuaca	Etla	13,856	11,893	+16.5%	193.0	74.5	71.8/km^{2} (185.9/sq mi)	March 15, 1825
San Francisco Teopan	San Francisco Teopan	Coixtlahuaca	312	394	−20.8%	86.3	33.3	3.6/km^{2} (9.4/sq mi)	March 15, 1825
San Francisco Tlapancingo	San Francisco Tlapancingo	Silacayoápam	2,472	2,152	+14.9%	99.6	38.5	24.8/km^{2} (64.3/sq mi)	May 6, 1826
San Gabriel Mixtepec	San Gabriel Mixtepec	Juquila	4,910	4,733	+3.7%	178.4	68.9	27.5/km^{2} (71.3/sq mi)	May 6, 1826
San Ildefonso Amatlán	San Ildefonso Amatlán	Miahuatlán	2,329	2,393	−2.7%	61.1	23.6	38.1/km^{2} (98.7/sq mi)	March 15, 1825
San Ildefonso Sola	San Ildefonso Sola	Sola de Vega	1,060	940	+12.8%	38.7	14.9	27.4/km^{2} (70.9/sq mi)	March 15, 1825
San Ildefonso Villa Alta	San Ildefonso Villa Alta	Villa Alta	3,677	3,478	+5.7%	93.9	36.3	39.2/km^{2} (101.4/sq mi)	July 28, 1823
San Jacinto Amilpas	San Jacinto Amilpas	Centro	16,827	13,860	+21.4%	4.2	1.6	4,006.4/km^{2} (10,376.6/sq mi)	March 15, 1825
San Jacinto Tlacotepec	San Jacinto Tlacotepec	Sola de Vega	2,233	2,231	+0.1%	63.6	24.6	35.1/km^{2} (90.9/sq mi)	May 6, 1826
San Jerónimo Coatlán	San Jerónimo Coatlán	Miahuatlán	5,537	5,449	+1.6%	583.7	225.4	9.5/km^{2} (24.6/sq mi)	March 15, 1825
San Jerónimo Silacayoapilla	San Jerónimo Silacayoapilla	Huajuapan	1,429	1,449	−1.4%	58.5	22.6	24.4/km^{2} (63.3/sq mi)	May 6, 1826
San Jerónimo Sosola	San Jerónimo Sosola	Etla	2,730	2,559	+6.7%	220.1	85.0	12.4/km^{2} (32.1/sq mi)	March 15, 1825
San Jerónimo Taviche	San Jerónimo Taviche	Ocotlán	2,046	1,848	+10.7%	72.7	28.1	28.1/km^{2} (72.9/sq mi)	March 15, 1825
San Jerónimo Tecóatl	San Jerónimo Tecóatl	Teotitlán	1,577	1,606	−1.8%	17.8	6.9	88.6/km^{2} (229.5/sq mi)	March 15, 1825
San Jerónimo Tlacochahuaya	San Jerónimo Tlacochahuaya	Tlacolula	5,764	5,076	+13.6%	36.7	14.2	157.1/km^{2} (406.8/sq mi)	March 15, 1825
San Jorge Nuchita	San Jorge Nuchita	Huajuapan	2,881	3,215	−10.4%	55.8	21.5	51.6/km^{2} (133.7/sq mi)	May 6, 1826
San José Ayuquila	San José Ayuquila	Huajuapan	1,629	1,511	+7.8%	21.8	8.4	74.7/km^{2} (193.5/sq mi)	May 6, 1826
San José Chiltepec	San José Chiltepec	Tuxtepec	11,310	11,019	+2.6%	193.1	74.6	58.6/km^{2} (151.7/sq mi)	March 15, 1825
San José del Peñasco	San José del Peñasco	Miahuatlán	2,149	2,094	+2.6%	28.5	11.0	75.4/km^{2} (195.3/sq mi)	December 9, 1878
San José del Progreso	San José del Progreso	Ocotlán	8,059	6,579	+22.5%	108.4	41.9	74.3/km^{2} (192.6/sq mi)	October 23, 1891
San José Estancia Grande	San José Estancia Grande	Jamiltepec	938	977	−4.0%	65.9	25.4	14.2/km^{2} (36.9/sq mi)	November 18, 1844
San José Independencia	San José Independencia	Tuxtepec	4,251	3,684	+15.4%	53.9	20.8	78.9/km^{2} (204.3/sq mi)	December 26, 1925
San José Lachiguiri	San José Lachiguiri	Miahuatlán	3,700	3,849	−3.9%	77.5	29.9	47.7/km^{2} (123.7/sq mi)	March 15, 1825
San José Tenango	San José Tenango	Teotitlán	18,102	18,478	−2.0%	257.9	99.6	70.2/km^{2} (181.8/sq mi)	March 15, 1825
San Juan Achiutla	San Juan Achiutla	Tlaxiaco	408	430	−5.1%	35.6	13.7	11.5/km^{2} (29.7/sq mi)	March 15, 1825
San Juan Atepec	San Juan Atepec	Ixtlán	1,457	1,517	−4.0%	134.2	51.8	10.9/km^{2} (28.1/sq mi)	March 15, 1825
San Juan Bautista Atatlahuca	San Juan Bautista Atatlahuca	Etla	1,424	1,724	−17.4%	421.6	162.8	3.4/km^{2} (8.7/sq mi)	March 15, 1825
San Juan Bautista Coixtlahuaca	San Juan Bautista Coixtlahuaca	Coixtlahuaca	2,725	2,808	−3.0%	286.2	110.5	9.5/km^{2} (24.7/sq mi)	March 15, 1825
San Juan Bautista Cuicatlán	San Juan Bautista Cuicatlán	Cuicatlán	10,365	9,441	+9.8%	496.4	191.7	20.9/km^{2} (54.1/sq mi)	March 15, 1825
San Juan Bautista Guelache	San Juan Bautista Guelache	Etla	6,692	6,287	+6.4%	52.1	20.1	128.4/km^{2} (332.7/sq mi)	March 15, 1825
San Juan Bautista Jayacatlán	San Juan Bautista Jayacatlán	Etla	1,447	1,462	−1.0%	114.4	44.2	12.6/km^{2} (32.8/sq mi)	March 15, 1825
San Juan Bautista Lo de Soto	San Juan Bautista Lo de Soto	Jamiltepec	2,344	2,325	+0.8%	72.1	27.8	32.5/km^{2} (84.2/sq mi)	October 23, 1891
San Juan Bautista Suchitepec	San Juan Bautista Suchitepec	Huajuapan	453	417	+8.6%	93.3	36.0	4.9/km^{2} (12.6/sq mi)	May 6, 1826
San Juan Bautista Tlachichilco	San Juan Bautista Tlachichilco	Silacayoápam	1,475	1,447	+1.9%	88.7	34.2	16.6/km^{2} (43.1/sq mi)	May 6, 1826
San Juan Bautista Tlacoatzintepec	San Juan Bautista Tlacoatzintepec	Cuicatlán	2,181	2,292	−4.8%	50.1	19.3	43.5/km^{2} (112.7/sq mi)	March 15, 1825
San Juan Bautista Tuxtepec	San Juan Bautista Tuxtepec	Tuxtepec	159,452	155,766	+2.4%	877.0	338.6	181.8/km^{2} (470.9/sq mi)	March 15, 1825
San Juan Bautista Valle Nacional (Note: San Juan Bautista Valle Nacional was originally incorporated as Valle Real, changing its name on November 18, 1844.)	San Juan Bautista Valle Nacional	Tuxtepec	23,067	22,446	+2.8%	684.4	264.2	33.7/km^{2} (87.3/sq mi)	March 15, 1825
San Juan Cacahuatepec	San Juan Cacahuatepec	Jamiltepec	8,939	8,680	+3.0%	202.6	78.2	44.1/km^{2} (114.3/sq mi)	May 6, 1826
San Juan Chicomezúchil (Note: San Juan Chicomezúchil was merged with Santa Catarina Latachao from 1938 to 1939.)	San Juan Chicomezúchil	Ixtlán	296	320	−7.5%	20.4	7.9	14.5/km^{2} (37.6/sq mi)	March 15, 1825
San Juan Chilateca (Note: San Juan Chilateca was merged with Ocotlán from 1937 to 1939.)	San Juan Chilateca	Ocotlán	1,522	1,442	+5.5%	5.2	2.0	292.7/km^{2} (758.1/sq mi)	March 15, 1825
San Juan Cieneguilla (Note: San Juan Cieneguilla was originally incorporated as Acevedo, changing its name on October 23, 1891.)	San Juan Cieneguilla	Silacayoápam	524	605	−13.4%	90.0	34.7	5.8/km^{2} (15.1/sq mi)	September 18, 1858
San Juan Coatzóspam	San Juan Coatzóspam	Teotitlán	1,808	2,535	−28.7%	66.1	25.5	27.4/km^{2} (70.8/sq mi)	March 15, 1825
San Juan Colorado	San Juan Colorado	Jamiltepec	9,609	9,494	+1.2%	124.0	47.9	77.5/km^{2} (200.7/sq mi)	May 6, 1826
San Juan Comaltepec	San Juan Comaltepec	Choápam	3,116	2,517	+23.8%	98.6	38.1	31.6/km^{2} (81.8/sq mi)	March 15, 1825
San Juan Cotzocón	San Juan Cotzocón	Mixe	22,444	22,356	+0.4%	1,382.5	533.8	16.2/km^{2} (42.0/sq mi)	March 15, 1825
San Juan de los Cues	San Juan de los Cues	Teotitlán	2,421	2,357	+2.7%	119.5	46.1	20.3/km^{2} (52.5/sq mi)	November 18, 1844
San Juan del Estado (Note: San Juan del Estado was originally incorporated as San Juan del Rey, changing its name on May 6, 1826.)	San Juan del Estado	Etla	2,807	2,546	+10.3%	132.1	51.0	21.2/km^{2} (55.0/sq mi)	March 15, 1825
San Juan del Río	San Juan del Río	Tlacolula	1,372	1,231	+11.5%	71.3	27.5	19.2/km^{2} (49.8/sq mi)	May 6, 1826
San Juan Diuxi	San Juan Diuxi	Nochixtlán	1,056	1,256	−15.9%	34.9	13.5	30.3/km^{2} (78.4/sq mi)	March 15, 1825
San Juan Evangelista Analco	San Juan Evangelista Analco	Ixtlán	407	404	+0.7%	16.6	6.4	24.5/km^{2} (63.5/sq mi)	March 15, 1825
San Juan Guelavía	San Juan Guelavía	Tlacolula	3,288	3,047	+7.9%	31.8	12.3	103.4/km^{2} (267.8/sq mi)	March 15, 1825
San Juan Guichicovi	San Juan Guichicovi	Juchitán	29,802	28,142	+5.9%	797.0	307.7	37.4/km^{2} (96.8/sq mi)	March 15, 1825
San Juan Ihualtepec	San Juan Ihualtepec	Silacayoápam	494	713	−30.7%	52.2	20.2	9.5/km^{2} (24.5/sq mi)	May 6, 1826
San Juan Juquila Mixes	San Juan Juquila Mixes	Yautepec	3,703	3,924	−5.6%	316.0	122.0	11.7/km^{2} (30.4/sq mi)	March 15, 1825
San Juan Juquila Vijanos	San Juan Juquila Vijanos	Villa Alta	1,880	1,832	+2.6%	56.5	21.8	33.3/km^{2} (86.2/sq mi)	March 15, 1825
San Juan Lachao	San Juan Lachao	Juquila	4,577	4,531	+1.0%	209.5	80.9	21.8/km^{2} (56.6/sq mi)	May 6, 1826
San Juan Lachigalla	San Juan Lachigalla	Ejutla	3,538	3,285	+7.7%	107.4	41.5	32.9/km^{2} (85.3/sq mi)	March 15, 1825
San Juan Lajarcia	San Juan Lajarcia	Yautepec	634	715	−11.3%	106.3	41.0	6.0/km^{2} (15.4/sq mi)	March 15, 1825
San Juan Lalana	San Juan Lalana	Choápam	16,989	17,398	−2.4%	694.1	268.0	24.5/km^{2} (63.4/sq mi)	March 15, 1825
San Juan Mazatlán	San Juan Mazatlán	Mixe	19,032	17,100	+11.3%	1,627.5	628.4	11.7/km^{2} (30.3/sq mi)	March 15, 1825
San Juan Mixtepec Distrito 08	San Juan Mixtepec Distrito 08	Miahuatlán	6,941	7,611	−8.8%	358.2	138.3	19.4/km^{2} (50.2/sq mi)	May 6, 1826
San Juan Mixtepec Distrito 26	San Juan Mixtepec Distrito 26	Juxtlahuaca	607	711	−14.6%	75.5	29.2	8.0/km^{2} (20.8/sq mi)	March 15, 1825
San Juan Ñumí	San Juan Ñumí	Tlaxiaco	5,773	6,666	−13.4%	212.1	81.9	27.2/km^{2} (70.5/sq mi)	March 15, 1825
San Juan Ozolotepec	San Juan Ozolotepec	Miahuatlán	3,411	3,168	+7.7%	206.5	79.7	16.5/km^{2} (42.8/sq mi)	March 15, 1825
San Juan Petlapa	San Juan Petlapa	Choápam	3,117	2,807	+11.0%	188.3	72.7	16.6/km^{2} (42.9/sq mi)	March 15, 1825
San Juan Quiahije	San Juan Quiahije	Juquila	4,203	3,628	+15.8%	203.9	78.7	20.6/km^{2} (53.4/sq mi)	May 6, 1826
San Juan Quiotepec	San Juan Quiotepec	Ixtlán	2,033	2,313	−12.1%	202.9	78.3	10.0/km^{2} (26.0/sq mi)	March 15, 1825
San Juan Sayultepec	San Juan Sayultepec	Nochixtlán	879	764	+15.1%	14.6	5.6	60.2/km^{2} (155.9/sq mi)	March 15, 1825
San Juan Tabaá	San Juan Tabaá	Villa Alta	1,241	1,331	−6.8%	19.6	7.6	63.3/km^{2} (164.0/sq mi)	March 15, 1825
San Juan Tamazola	San Juan Tamazola	Nochixtlán	3,325	3,446	−3.5%	359.6	138.8	9.2/km^{2} (23.9/sq mi)	March 15, 1825
San Juan Teita	San Juan Teita	Tlaxiaco	544	607	−10.4%	71.0	27.4	7.7/km^{2} (19.8/sq mi)	March 15, 1825
San Juan Teitipac	San Juan Teitipac	Tlacolula	2,668	2,565	+4.0%	41.3	15.9	64.6/km^{2} (167.3/sq mi)	March 15, 1825
San Juan Tepeuxila	San Juan Tepeuxila	Cuicatlán	2,692	2,773	−2.9%	255.1	98.5	10.6/km^{2} (27.3/sq mi)	March 15, 1825
San Juan Teposcolula	San Juan Teposcolula	Teposcolula	1,494	1,340	+11.5%	87.0	33.6	17.2/km^{2} (44.5/sq mi)	November 18, 1844
San Juan Yaeé	San Juan Yaeé	Villa Alta	1,426	1,530	−6.8%	37.8	14.6	37.7/km^{2} (97.7/sq mi)	March 15, 1825
San Juan Yatzona	San Juan Yatzona	Villa Alta	440	452	−2.7%	29.1	11.2	15.1/km^{2} (39.2/sq mi)	March 15, 1825
San Juan Yucuita	San Juan Yucuita	Nochixtlán	643	684	−6.0%	23.4	9.0	27.5/km^{2} (71.2/sq mi)	March 15, 1825
San Lorenzo	San Lorenzo	Jamiltepec	5,903	5,955	−0.9%	58.6	22.6	100.7/km^{2} (260.9/sq mi)	May 6, 1826
San Lorenzo Albarradas (Note: San Lorenzo Albarradas was merged with San Pablo Villa de Mitla from 1936 to 1940.)	San Lorenzo Albarradas	Tlacolula	2,971	2,708	+9.7%	134.4	51.9	22.1/km^{2} (57.3/sq mi)	May 6, 1826
San Lorenzo Cacaotepec (Note: San Lorenzo Cacaotepec was originally incorporated as San Lorenzo Zautla, changing its name on May 6, 1826.)	San Lorenzo Cacaotepec	Etla	18,339	13,704	+33.8%	27.6	10.7	664.5/km^{2} (1,720.9/sq mi)	March 15, 1825
San Lorenzo Cuaunecuiltitla (Note: San Lorenzo Cuaunecuiltitla was originally incorporated as San Lorenzo Huehuetlán, changing its name on November 18, 1844.)	San Lorenzo Cuaunecuiltitla	Teotitlán	833	771	+8.0%	9.2	3.6	90.5/km^{2} (234.5/sq mi)	March 15, 1825
San Lorenzo Texmelucan	San Lorenzo Texmelucan	Sola de Vega	9,148	7,048	+29.8%	137.4	53.1	66.6/km^{2} (172.4/sq mi)	May 6, 1826
San Lorenzo Victoria (Note: San Lorenzo Victoria was originally incorporated as San Lorenzo del Potrero, changing its name on October 23, 1891.)	San Lorenzo Victoria	Silacayoápam	932	1,007	−7.4%	52.0	20.1	17.9/km^{2} (46.4/sq mi)	March 28, 1857
San Lucas Camotlán	San Lucas Camotlán	Mixe	3,187	3,026	+5.3%	101.6	39.2	31.4/km^{2} (81.2/sq mi)	March 15, 1825
San Lucas Ojitlán	San Lucas Ojitlán	Tuxtepec	22,185	21,514	+3.1%	454.9	175.6	48.8/km^{2} (126.3/sq mi)	March 15, 1825
San Lucas Quiaviní	San Lucas Quiaviní	Tlacolula	1,720	1,745	−1.4%	51.8	20.0	33.2/km^{2} (86.0/sq mi)	March 15, 1825
San Lucas Zoquiápam	San Lucas Zoquiápam	Teotitlán	7,163	7,554	−5.2%	65.0	25.1	110.2/km^{2} (285.4/sq mi)	March 15, 1825
San Luis Amatlán	San Luis Amatlán	Miahuatlán	3,829	3,624	+5.7%	289.0	111.6	13.2/km^{2} (34.3/sq mi)	March 15, 1825
San Marcial Ozolotepec	San Marcial Ozolotepec	Miahuatlán	1,372	1,525	−10.0%	53.8	20.8	25.5/km^{2} (66.0/sq mi)	March 15, 1825
San Marcos Arteaga	San Marcos Arteaga	Huajuapan	1,568	1,557	+0.7%	127.9	49.4	12.3/km^{2} (31.8/sq mi)	July 24, 1864
San Martín de los Cansecos	San Martín de los Cansecos	Ejutla	994	816	+21.8%	8.3	3.2	119.8/km^{2} (310.2/sq mi)	March 15, 1825
San Martín Huamelúlpam	San Martín Huamelúlpam	Tlaxiaco	1,000	1,077	−7.1%	42.8	16.5	23.4/km^{2} (60.5/sq mi)	March 15, 1825
San Martín Itunyoso	San Martín Itunyoso	Tlaxiaco	2,749	2,460	+11.7%	63.7	24.6	43.2/km^{2} (111.8/sq mi)	November 18, 1844
San Martín Lachilá	San Martín Lachilá	Ejutla	1,034	1,084	−4.6%	10.7	4.1	96.6/km^{2} (250.3/sq mi)	March 15, 1825
San Martín Peras	San Martín Peras	Juxtlahuaca	12,436	11,361	+9.5%	242.7	93.7	51.2/km^{2} (132.7/sq mi)	May 6, 1826
San Martín Tilcajete	San Martín Tilcajete	Ocotlán	1,975	1,742	+13.4%	24.2	9.3	81.6/km^{2} (211.4/sq mi)	March 15, 1825
San Martín Toxpalan	San Martín Toxpalan	Teotitlán	3,934	3,669	+7.2%	64.1	24.7	61.4/km^{2} (159.0/sq mi)	November 18, 1844
San Martín Zacatepec	San Martín Zacatepec	Huajuapan	1,324	1,277	+3.7%	43.3	16.7	30.6/km^{2} (79.2/sq mi)	May 6, 1826
San Mateo Cajonos	San Mateo Cajonos	Villa Alta	611	620	−1.5%	14.7	5.7	41.6/km^{2} (107.7/sq mi)	March 15, 1825
San Mateo del Mar	San Mateo del Mar	Tehuantepec	15,571	14,252	+9.3%	89.7	34.6	173.6/km^{2} (449.6/sq mi)	March 15, 1825
San Mateo Etlatongo	San Mateo Etlatongo	Nochixtlán	1,239	1,181	+4.9%	23.5	9.1	52.7/km^{2} (136.6/sq mi)	March 15, 1825
San Mateo Nejápam	San Mateo Nejápam	Silacayoápam	1,217	1,180	+3.1%	64.0	24.7	19.0/km^{2} (49.3/sq mi)	May 6, 1826
San Mateo Peñasco	San Mateo Peñasco	Tlaxiaco	2,384	2,116	+12.7%	55.9	21.6	42.6/km^{2} (110.5/sq mi)	March 15, 1825
San Mateo Piñas	San Mateo Piñas	Pochutla	2,021	2,226	−9.2%	161.8	62.5	12.5/km^{2} (32.4/sq mi)	March 15, 1825
San Mateo Río Hondo	San Mateo Río Hondo	Miahuatlán	3,207	3,308	−3.1%	211.1	81.5	15.2/km^{2} (39.3/sq mi)	March 15, 1825
San Mateo Sindihui	San Mateo Sindihui	Nochixtlán	1,977	2,086	−5.2%	141.6	54.7	14.0/km^{2} (36.2/sq mi)	March 15, 1825
San Mateo Tlapiltepec	San Mateo Tlapiltepec	Coixtlahuaca	229	234	−2.1%	24.4	9.4	9.4/km^{2} (24.3/sq mi)	March 15, 1825
San Mateo Yoloxochitlán	San Mateo Yoloxochitlán	Teotitlán	3,831	3,475	+10.2%	7.1	2.7	539.6/km^{2} (1,397.5/sq mi)	March 15, 1825
San Mateo Yucutindoo (Note: San Mateo Yucutindoo was originally incorporated as Zapotitlán de Río, changing its name on February 1, 2012.)	Zapotitlán del Río	Sola de Vega	3,144	3,034	+3.6%	197.8	76.4	15.9/km^{2} (41.2/sq mi)	1901
San Melchor Betaza	San Melchor Betaza	Villa Alta	1,052	1,091	−3.6%	34.1	13.2	30.9/km^{2} (79.9/sq mi)	March 15, 1825
San Miguel Achiutla	San Miguel Achiutla	Tlaxiaco	698	744	−6.2%	67.6	26.1	10.3/km^{2} (26.7/sq mi)	March 15, 1825
San Miguel Ahuehuetitlán	San Miguel Ahuehuetitlán	Silacayoápam	2,142	2,465	−13.1%	86.1	33.2	24.9/km^{2} (64.4/sq mi)	May 6, 1826
San Miguel Aloápam	San Miguel Aloápam	Ixtlán	2,191	2,488	−11.9%	142.1	54.9	15.4/km^{2} (39.9/sq mi)	March 15, 1825
San Miguel Amatitlán	San Miguel Amatitlán	Huajuapan	6,932	7,244	−4.3%	179.2	69.2	38.7/km^{2} (100.2/sq mi)	November 18, 1844
San Miguel Amatlán	San Miguel Amatlán	Ixtlán	991	1,043	−5.0%	60.8	23.5	16.3/km^{2} (42.2/sq mi)	March 15, 1825
San Miguel Chicahua	San Miguel Chicahua	Nochixtlán	2,169	2,274	−4.6%	61.6	23.8	35.2/km^{2} (91.2/sq mi)	March 15, 1825
San Miguel Chimalapa	San Miguel Chimalapa	Juchitán	6,711	6,608	+1.6%	1,184.3	457.3	5.7/km^{2} (14.7/sq mi)	March 15, 1825
San Miguel Coatlán	San Miguel Coatlán	Miahuatlán	3,184	3,483	−8.6%	123.5	47.7	25.8/km^{2} (66.8/sq mi)	March 15, 1825
San Miguel del Puerto	San Miguel del Puerto	Pochutla	8,551	8,481	+0.8%	519.3	200.5	16.5/km^{2} (42.6/sq mi)	March 15, 1825
San Miguel del Río (Note: San Miguel del Río merged with Teococuilco for a few years, from 1937 to 1940.)	San Miguel del Río	Ixtlán	245	294	−16.7%	10.6	4.1	23.1/km^{2} (59.9/sq mi)	March 15, 1825
San Miguel Ejutla	San Miguel Ejutla	Ejutla	1,149	916	+25.4%	10.7	4.1	107.4/km^{2} (278.1/sq mi)	March 15, 1825
San Miguel el Grande	San Miguel el Grande	Tlaxiaco	4,313	4,127	+4.5%	103.3	39.9	41.8/km^{2} (108.1/sq mi)	March 15, 1825
San Miguel Huautla	San Miguel Huautla	Nochixtlán	1,311	1,399	−6.3%	65.0	25.1	20.2/km^{2} (52.2/sq mi)	March 15, 1825
San Miguel Mixtepec	San Miguel Mixtepec	Zimatlán	3,194	3,245	−1.6%	72.9	28.1	43.8/km^{2} (113.5/sq mi)	March 15, 1825
San Miguel Panixtlahuaca	San Miguel Panixtlahuaca	Juquila	6,252	6,161	+1.5%	144.2	55.7	43.4/km^{2} (112.3/sq mi)	May 6, 1826
San Miguel Peras	San Miguel Peras	Zaachila	3,818	3,497	+9.2%	155.2	59.9	24.6/km^{2} (63.7/sq mi)	May 6, 1826
San Miguel Piedras	San Miguel Piedras	Nochixtlán	1,328	1,296	+2.5%	65.5	25.3	20.3/km^{2} (52.5/sq mi)	March 15, 1825
San Miguel Quetzaltepec	San Miguel Quetzaltepec	Mixe	7,286	7,293	−0.1%	207.7	80.2	35.1/km^{2} (90.9/sq mi)	March 15, 1825
San Miguel Santa Flor	San Miguel Santa Flor	Cuicatlán	691	801	−13.7%	19.8	7.6	34.9/km^{2} (90.4/sq mi)	December 15, 1942
San Miguel Soyaltepec	Temascal	Tuxtepec	38,682	36,564	+5.8%	743.5	287.1	52.0/km^{2} (134.7/sq mi)	March 15, 1825
San Miguel Suchixtepec	San Miguel Suchixtepec	Miahuatlán	2,932	2,911	+0.7%	69.6	26.9	42.1/km^{2} (109.1/sq mi)	March 15, 1825
San Miguel Tecomatlán	San Miguel Tecomatlán	Nochixtlán	305	308	−1.0%	19.7	7.6	15.5/km^{2} (40.1/sq mi)	March 15, 1825
San Miguel Tenango	San Miguel Tenango	Tehuantepec	653	794	−17.8%	205.5	79.3	3.2/km^{2} (8.2/sq mi)	November 18, 1844
San Miguel Tequixtepec	San Miguel Tequixtepec	Coixtlahuaca	1,044	1,042	+0.2%	162.2	62.6	6.4/km^{2} (16.7/sq mi)	May 6, 1826
San Miguel Tilquiápam	San Miguel Tilquiápam	Ocotlán	3,141	3,160	−0.6%	71.1	27.5	44.2/km^{2} (114.4/sq mi)	March 15, 1825
San Miguel Tlacamama	San Miguel Tlacamama	Jamiltepec	3,668	3,386	+8.3%	103.7	40.0	35.4/km^{2} (91.6/sq mi)	May 6, 1826
San Miguel Tlacotepec	San Miguel Tlacotepec	Juxtlahuaca	3,100	3,220	−3.7%	55.6	21.5	55.8/km^{2} (144.4/sq mi)	May 6, 1826
San Miguel Tulancingo	San Miguel Tulancingo	Coixtlahuaca	307	346	−11.3%	46.7	18.0	6.6/km^{2} (17.0/sq mi)	March 15, 1825
San Miguel Yotao	San Miguel Yotao	Ixtlán	585	611	−4.3%	39.2	15.1	14.9/km^{2} (38.7/sq mi)	March 15, 1825
San Nicolás	San Nicolás	Miahuatlán	1,214	1,143	+6.2%	29.6	11.4	41.0/km^{2} (106.2/sq mi)	October 23, 1891
San Nicolás Hidalgo (Note: San Nicolás Hidalgo merged with Silacayoápam in 1891, but became autonomous again in 1942.)	San Nicolás Hidalgo	Silacayoápam	1,043	1,012	+3.1%	11.3	4.4	92.3/km^{2} (239.1/sq mi)	January 22, 1857
San Pablo Coatlán	San Pablo Coatlán	Miahuatlán	4,308	4,167	+3.4%	187.9	72.5	22.9/km^{2} (59.4/sq mi)	March 15, 1825
San Pablo Cuatro Venados	San Pablo Cuatro Venados	Zaachila	1,510	1,388	+8.8%	73.8	28.5	20.5/km^{2} (53.0/sq mi)	March 15, 1825
San Pablo Etla	San Pablo Etla	Etla	17,116	15,535	+10.2%	44.4	17.1	385.5/km^{2} (998.4/sq mi)	March 15, 1825
San Pablo Huitzo	San Pablo Huitzo	Etla	7,035	6,307	+11.5%	101.5	39.2	69.3/km^{2} (179.5/sq mi)	July 28, 1823
San Pablo Huixtepec (Note: San Pablo Huixtepec was originally incorporated as San Pablo de la Raya, changing its name on May 6, 1826.)	San Pablo Huixtepec	Zimatlán	10,020	9,025	+11.0%	43.3	16.7	231.4/km^{2} (599.3/sq mi)	March 15, 1825
San Pablo Macuiltianguis	San Pablo Macuiltianguis	Ixtlán	955	929	+2.8%	149.6	57.8	6.4/km^{2} (16.5/sq mi)	March 15, 1825
San Pablo Tijaltepec	San Pablo Tijaltepec	Tlaxiaco	2,751	2,150	+28.0%	117.5	45.4	23.4/km^{2} (60.6/sq mi)	March 15, 1825
San Pablo Villa de Mitla	San Pablo Villa de Mitla	Tlacolula	13,587	11,825	+14.9%	280.4	108.3	48.5/km^{2} (125.5/sq mi)	March 15, 1825
San Pablo Yaganiza	San Pablo Yaganiza	Villa Alta	1,125	1,108	+1.5%	35.4	13.7	31.8/km^{2} (82.3/sq mi)	March 15, 1825
San Pedro Amuzgos	San Pedro Amuzgos	Putla	6,632	6,468	+2.5%	121.4	46.9	54.6/km^{2} (141.5/sq mi)	May 6, 1826
San Pedro Apóstol	San Pedro Apóstol	Ocotlán	1,594	1,544	+3.2%	8.9	3.4	179.1/km^{2} (463.9/sq mi)	March 15, 1825
San Pedro Atoyac	San Pedro Atoyac	Jamiltepec	4,559	4,136	+10.2%	74.4	28.7	61.3/km^{2} (158.7/sq mi)	May 6, 1826
San Pedro Cajonos	San Pedro Cajonos	Villa Alta	1,081	1,172	−7.8%	2.8	1.1	386.1/km^{2} (999.9/sq mi)	March 15, 1825
San Pedro Comitancillo	San Pedro Comitancillo	Tehuantepec	4,333	3,944	+9.9%	46.8	18.1	92.6/km^{2} (239.8/sq mi)	November 18, 1844
San Pedro Coxcaltepec Cántaros	San Pedro Coxcaltepec Cántaros	Nochixtlán	716	851	−15.9%	94.7	36.6	7.6/km^{2} (19.6/sq mi)	March 15, 1825
San Pedro el Alto	San Pedro el Alto	Pochutla	4,654	3,903	+19.2%	74.5	28.8	62.5/km^{2} (161.8/sq mi)	March 15, 1825
San Pedro Huamelula	San Pedro Huamelula	Tehuantepec	9,735	9,594	+1.5%	693.9	267.9	14.0/km^{2} (36.3/sq mi)	March 15, 1825
San Pedro Huilotepec	San Pedro Huilotepec	Tehuantepec	3,307	2,839	+16.5%	26.5	10.2	124.8/km^{2} (323.2/sq mi)	March 15, 1825
San Pedro Ixcatlán	San Pedro Ixcatlán	Tuxtepec	10,368	10,371	0.0%	101.9	39.3	101.7/km^{2} (263.5/sq mi)	March 15, 1825
San Pedro Ixtlahuaca	San Pedro Ixtlahuaca	Centro	14,552	6,822	+113.3%	23.2	9.0	627.2/km^{2} (1,624.5/sq mi)	March 15, 1825
San Pedro Jaltepetongo	San Pedro Jaltepetongo	Cuicatlán	483	458	+5.5%	51.5	19.9	9.4/km^{2} (24.3/sq mi)	March 15, 1825
San Pedro Jicayán	San Pedro Jicayán	Jamiltepec	11,279	11,555	−2.4%	85.1	32.9	132.5/km^{2} (343.3/sq mi)	May 6, 1826
San Pedro Jocotipac	San Pedro Jocotipac	Cuicatlán	730	834	−12.5%	69.4	26.8	10.5/km^{2} (27.2/sq mi)	March 15, 1825
San Pedro Juchatengo	San Pedro Juchatengo	Juquila	1,755	1,693	+3.7%	58.2	22.5	30.2/km^{2} (78.1/sq mi)	May 6, 1826
San Pedro Mártir	San Pedro Mártir	Ocotlán	1,899	1,711	+11.0%	7.6	2.9	249.9/km^{2} (647.2/sq mi)	March 15, 1825
San Pedro Mártir Quiechapa	San Pedro Mártir Quiechapa	Yautepec	738	753	−2.0%	121.0	46.7	6.1/km^{2} (15.8/sq mi)	July 28, 1823
San Pedro Mártir Yucuxaco	San Pedro Mártir Yucuxaco	Tlaxiaco	1,257	1,405	−10.5%	81.9	31.6	15.3/km^{2} (39.8/sq mi)	March 15, 1825
San Pedro Mixtepec Distrito 22	San Pedro Mixtepec Distrito 22	Juquila	49,780	42,860	+16.1%	325.1	125.5	153.1/km^{2} (396.6/sq mi)	May 6, 1826
San Pedro Mixtepec Distrito 26	San Pedro Mixtepec Distrito 26	Miahuatlán	972	1,099	−11.6%	154.6	59.7	6.3/km^{2} (16.3/sq mi)	March 15, 1825
San Pedro Molinos	San Pedro Molinos	Tlaxiaco	706	723	−2.4%	26.4	10.2	26.7/km^{2} (69.3/sq mi)	March 15, 1825
San Pedro Nopala	San Pedro Nopala	Teposcolula	751	840	−10.6%	109.6	42.3	6.9/km^{2} (17.7/sq mi)	March 15, 1825
San Pedro Ocopetatillo	San Pedro Ocopetatillo	Teotitlán	786	884	−11.1%	6.6	2.5	119.1/km^{2} (308.4/sq mi)	March 15, 1825
San Pedro Ocotepec	San Pedro Ocotepec	Mixe	2,404	2,135	+12.6%	42.1	16.3	57.1/km^{2} (147.9/sq mi)	March 15, 1825
San Pedro Pochutla	San Pedro Pochutla	Pochutla	48,204	43,860	+9.9%	444.9	171.8	108.3/km^{2} (280.6/sq mi)	March 15, 1825
San Pedro Quiatoni	San Pedro Quiatoni	Tlacolula	11,930	10,491	+13.7%	564.1	217.8	21.1/km^{2} (54.8/sq mi)	March 15, 1825
San Pedro Sochiápam	San Pedro Sochiápam	Cuicatlán	5,052	4,957	+1.9%	152.2	58.8	33.2/km^{2} (86.0/sq mi)	March 15, 1825
San Pedro Tapanatepec	San Pedro Tapanatepec	Juchitán	15,479	13,992	+10.6%	993.7	383.7	15.6/km^{2} (40.3/sq mi)	March 15, 1825
San Pedro Taviche	San Pedro Taviche	Ocotlán	1,441	1,173	+22.8%	98.4	38.0	14.6/km^{2} (37.9/sq mi)	March 15, 1825
San Pedro Teozacoalco	San Pedro Teozacoalco	Nochixtlán	1,153	1,320	−12.7%	93.0	35.9	12.4/km^{2} (32.1/sq mi)	March 15, 1825
San Pedro Teutila	San Pedro Teutila	Cuicatlán	4,296	4,277	+0.4%	148.7	57.4	28.9/km^{2} (74.8/sq mi)	July 28, 1823
San Pedro Tidaá (Note: San Pedro Tidaá merged with Magadelan Yodocono in 1938, but became autonomous again in 1953.)	San Pedro Tidaá	Nochixtlán	982	894	+9.8%	45.9	17.7	21.4/km^{2} (55.4/sq mi)	November 18, 1844
San Pedro Topiltepec (Note: San Pedro Topiltepec was originally incorporated as Tutuxtepec, changing its name on May 6, 1826. It merged with Teposcolula in 1891, but became autonomous again in 1942.)	San Pedro Topiltepec	Teposcolula	373	406	−8.1%	32.8	12.7	11.4/km^{2} (29.5/sq mi)	March 15, 1825
San Pedro Totolápam (Note: San Pedro Totolápam was originally incorporated as Santa María Totolapa, changing its name on November 18, 1844.)	San Pedro Totolápam	Tlacolula	3,294	2,603	+26.5%	401.8	155.1	8.2/km^{2} (21.2/sq mi)	March 15, 1825
San Pedro y San Pablo Ayutla	San Pedro y San Pablo Ayutla	Mixe	5,616	5,602	+0.2%	171.7	66.3	32.7/km^{2} (84.7/sq mi)	March 15, 1825
San Pedro y San Pablo Teposcolula	San Pedro y San Pablo Teposcolula	Teposcolula	4,353	3,989	+9.1%	178.8	69.0	24.3/km^{2} (63.1/sq mi)	July 28, 1823
San Pedro y San Pablo Tequixtepec	San Pedro y San Pablo Tequixtepec	Huajuapan	1,747	1,878	−7.0%	180.2	69.6	9.7/km^{2} (25.1/sq mi)	May 6, 1826
San Pedro Yaneri	San Pedro Yaneri	Ixtlán	867	1,002	−13.5%	28.1	10.8	30.9/km^{2} (79.9/sq mi)	March 15, 1825
San Pedro Yólox	San Pedro Yólox	Ixtlán	1,697	2,267	−25.1%	165.4	63.9	10.3/km^{2} (26.6/sq mi)	March 15, 1825
San Pedro Yucunama	San Pedro Yucunama	Teposcolula	241	232	+3.9%	29.8	11.5	8.1/km^{2} (20.9/sq mi)	March 15, 1825
San Raymundo Jalpan	San Raymundo Jalpan	Centro	4,105	2,079	+97.5%	8.2	3.2	500.6/km^{2} (1,296.6/sq mi)	March 15, 1825
San Sebastián Abasolo	San Sebastián Abasolo	Tlacolula	1,999	1,849	+8.1%	15.4	5.9	129.8/km^{2} (336.2/sq mi)	December 6, 1878
San Sebastián Coatlán	San Sebastián Coatlán	Miahuatlán	2,809	2,613	+7.5%	206.9	79.9	13.6/km^{2} (35.2/sq mi)	March 15, 1825
San Sebastián Ixcapa	San Sebastián Ixcapa	Jamiltepec	4,188	3,968	+5.5%	98.3	38.0	42.6/km^{2} (110.3/sq mi)	May 6, 1826
San Sebastián Nicananduta	San Sebastián Nicananduta	Teposcolula	1,542	1,449	+6.4%	44.1	17.0	35.0/km^{2} (90.6/sq mi)	March 15, 1825
San Sebastián Río Hondo (Note: San Sebastián Río Hondo was originally incorporated as San Sebastián Osolotepec, changing its name on October 23, 1891. It merged with Miahuatlán in 1891, but became autonomous again in 1942.)	San Sebastián Río Hondo	Miahuatlán	4,202	3,664	+14.7%	106.2	41.0	39.6/km^{2} (102.5/sq mi)	March 15, 1825
San Sebastián Tecomaxtlahuaca	San Sebastián Tecomaxtlahuaca	Juxtlahuaca	8,192	8,246	−0.7%	230.9	89.2	35.5/km^{2} (91.9/sq mi)	May 6, 1826
San Sebastián Teitipac	San Sebastián Teitipac	Tlacolula	2,189	1,976	+10.8%	30.5	11.8	71.8/km^{2} (185.9/sq mi)	March 15, 1825
San Sebastián Tutla	San Sebastián Tutla	Centro	16,878	16,241	+3.9%	7.3	2.8	2,312.1/km^{2} (5,988.2/sq mi)	March 15, 1825
San Simón Almolongas	San Simón Almolongas	Miahuatlán	2,802	2,623	+6.8%	50.8	19.6	55.2/km^{2} (142.9/sq mi)	March 15, 1825
San Simón Zahuatlán	San Simón Zahuatlán	Huajuapan	4,940	3,833	+28.9%	46.1	17.8	107.2/km^{2} (277.5/sq mi)	May 6, 1826
San Vicente Coatlán	San Vicente Coatlán	Ejutla	3,512	3,964	−11.4%	106.0	40.9	33.1/km^{2} (85.8/sq mi)	March 15, 1825
San Vicente Lachixío	San Vicente Lachixío	Sola de Vega	3,227	2,976	+8.4%	136.5	52.7	23.6/km^{2} (61.2/sq mi)	March 15, 1825
San Vicente Nuñú	San Vicente Nuñú	Teposcolula	449	493	−8.9%	71.4	27.6	6.3/km^{2} (16.3/sq mi)	March 15, 1825
Santa Ana	Santa Ana	Miahuatlán	2,406	1,978	+21.6%	54.8	21.2	43.9/km^{2} (113.7/sq mi)	October 23, 1891
Santa Ana Ateixtlahuaca (Note: Santa Ana Ateixtlahuaca was originally incorporated as Santa Ana Huehuetlán, changing its name on November 18, 1844.)	Santa Ana Ateixtlahuaca	Teotitlán	477	510	−6.5%	15.0	5.8	31.8/km^{2} (82.4/sq mi)	March 15, 1825
Santa Ana Cuauhtémoc (Note: Santa Ana Cuauhtémoc was originally incorporated as Santa Ana Chiquihuistlán, changing its name on June 22, 1940.)	Santa Ana Cuauhtémoc	Cuicatlán	681	738	−7.7%	41.3	15.9	16.5/km^{2} (42.7/sq mi)	March 15, 1825
Santa Ana del Valle	Santa Ana del Valle	Tlacolula	2,179	1,993	+9.3%	27.9	10.8	78.1/km^{2} (202.3/sq mi)	March 15, 1825
Santa Ana Tavela	Santa Ana Tavela	Yautepec	848	908	−6.6%	172.3	66.5	4.9/km^{2} (12.7/sq mi)	March 15, 1825
Santa Ana Tlapacoyan	Santa Ana Tlapacoyan	Zimatlán	1,958	1,854	+5.6%	46.7	18.0	41.9/km^{2} (108.6/sq mi)	March 15, 1825
Santa Ana Yareni	Santa Ana Yareni	Ixtlán	637	809	−21.3%	46.4	17.9	13.7/km^{2} (35.6/sq mi)	March 15, 1825
Santa Ana Zegache	Santa Ana Zegache	Ocotlán	3,981	3,592	+10.8%	26.8	10.3	148.5/km^{2} (384.7/sq mi)	March 15, 1825
Santa Catalina Quierí	Santa Catalina Quierí	Yautepec	825	922	−10.5%	51.2	19.8	16.1/km^{2} (41.7/sq mi)	March 15, 1825
Santa Catarina Cuixtla	Santa Catarina Cuixtla	Miahuatlán	1,495	1,496	−0.1%	25.6	9.9	58.4/km^{2} (151.3/sq mi)	March 15, 1825
Santa Catarina Ixtepeji	Santa Catarina Ixtepeji	Ixtlán	2,675	2,633	+1.6%	220.1	85.0	12.2/km^{2} (31.5/sq mi)	July 28, 1823
Santa Catarina Juquila	Santa Catarina Juquila	Juquila	18,654	14,710	+26.8%	637.8	246.3	29.2/km^{2} (75.8/sq mi)	March 15, 1825
Santa Catarina Lachatao	Santa Catarina Lachatao	Ixtlán	1,059	1,307	−19.0%	101.1	39.0	10.5/km^{2} (27.1/sq mi)	March 15, 1825
Santa Catarina Loxicha (Note: Santa Catarina Loxicha merged with San Miguel Loxicha for a few years, from 1936 to 1941.)	Santa Catarina Loxicha	Pochutla	3,676	3,986	−7.8%	126.6	48.9	29.0/km^{2} (75.2/sq mi)	March 15, 1825
Santa Catarina Mechoacán	Santa Catarina Mechoacán	Jamiltepec	4,582	4,543	+0.9%	51.2	19.8	89.5/km^{2} (231.8/sq mi)	May 6, 1826
Santa Catarina Minas	Santa Catarina Minas	Ocotlán	2,067	1,816	+13.8%	36.3	14.0	56.9/km^{2} (147.5/sq mi)	March 15, 1825
Santa Catarina Quiané	Santa Catarina Quiané	Zimatlán	2,193	1,847	+18.7%	20.7	8.0	105.9/km^{2} (274.4/sq mi)	March 15, 1825
Santa Catarina Quioquitani	Santa Catarina Quioquitani	Yautepec	456	505	−9.7%	38.4	14.8	11.9/km^{2} (30.8/sq mi)	March 15, 1825
Santa Catarina Tayata	Santa Catarina Tayata	Tlaxiaco	662	679	−2.5%	38.6	14.9	17.2/km^{2} (44.4/sq mi)	March 15, 1825
Santa Catarina Ticuá	Santa Catarina Ticuá	Tlaxiaco	986	954	+3.4%	29.8	11.5	33.1/km^{2} (85.7/sq mi)	March 15, 1825
Santa Catarina Yosonotú	Santa Catarina Yosonotú	Tlaxiaco	1,316	1,886	−30.2%	38.3	14.8	34.4/km^{2} (89.0/sq mi)	March 15, 1825
Santa Catarina Zapoquila	Santa Catarina Zapoquila	Huajuapan	403	448	−10.0%	118.3	45.7	3.4/km^{2} (8.8/sq mi)	May 6, 1826
Santa Cruz Acatepec	Santa Cruz Acatepec	Teotitlán	1,645	1,470	+11.9%	7.1	2.7	231.7/km^{2} (600.1/sq mi)	March 15, 1825
Santa Cruz Amilpas	Santa Cruz Amilpas	Centro	13,200	10,120	+30.4%	2.3	0.9	5,739.1/km^{2} (14,864.3/sq mi)	March 15, 1825
Santa Cruz de Bravo	Santa Cruz de Bravo	Silacayoápam	365	364	+0.3%	18.4	7.1	19.8/km^{2} (51.4/sq mi)	December 15, 1942
Santa Cruz Itundujia	Santa Cruz Itundujia	Putla	10,860	10,975	−1.0%	564.0	217.8	19.3/km^{2} (49.9/sq mi)	March 15, 1825
Santa Cruz Mixtepec	Santa Cruz Mixtepec	Zimatlán	3,720	3,615	+2.9%	46.9	18.1	79.3/km^{2} (205.4/sq mi)	March 15, 1825
Santa Cruz Nundaco	Santa Cruz Nundaco	Tlaxiaco	2,951	2,958	−0.2%	43.6	16.8	67.7/km^{2} (175.3/sq mi)	March 15, 1825
Santa Cruz Papalutla	Santa Cruz Papalutla	Tlacolula	2,242	1,972	+13.7%	14.8	5.7	151.5/km^{2} (392.3/sq mi)	March 15, 1825
Santa Cruz Tacache	Santa Cruz Tacache de Mina	Huajuapan	2,940	2,606	+12.8%	27.5	10.6	106.9/km^{2} (276.9/sq mi)	December 14, 1878
Santa Cruz Tacahua	Santa Cruz Tacahua	Tlaxiaco	1,182	1,170	+1.0%	47.4	18.3	24.9/km^{2} (64.6/sq mi)	March 15, 1825
Santa Cruz Tayata	Santa Cruz Tayata	Tlaxiaco	595	608	−2.1%	21.8	8.4	27.3/km^{2} (70.7/sq mi)	March 15, 1825
Santa Cruz Xitla	Santa Cruz Xitla	Miahuatlán	4,794	4,514	+6.2%	56.9	22.0	84.3/km^{2} (218.2/sq mi)	March 15, 1825
Santa Cruz Xoxocotlán	Santa Cruz Xoxocotlán	Centro	100,402	77,833	+29.0%	43.9	16.9	2,287.1/km^{2} (5,923.5/sq mi)	March 15, 1825
Santa Cruz Zenzontepec	Santa Cruz Zenzontepec	Sola de Vega	19,079	17,897	+6.6%	483.8	186.8	39.4/km^{2} (102.1/sq mi)	March 15, 1825
Santa Gertrudis	Santa Gertrudis	Zimatlán	2,891	2,858	+1.2%	30.4	11.7	95.1/km^{2} (246.3/sq mi)	October 23, 1891
Santa Inés de Zaragoza	Santa Inés de Zaragoza	Nochixtlán	1,454	1,707	−14.8%	83.8	32.4	17.4/km^{2} (44.9/sq mi)	March 15, 1825
Santa Inés del Monte	Santa Inés del Monte	Zaachila	2,809	2,535	+10.8%	49.1	19.0	57.2/km^{2} (148.2/sq mi)	March 15, 1825
Santa Inés Yatzeche	Santa Inés Yatzeche	Zimatlán	908	921	−1.4%	2.4	0.9	378.3/km^{2} (979.9/sq mi)	March 15, 1825
Santa Lucía del Camino	Santa Lucía del Camino	Centro	50,362	47,356	+6.3%	9.4	3.6	5,357.7/km^{2} (13,876.3/sq mi)	March 15, 1825
Santa Lucía Miahuatlán	Santa Lucía Miahuatlán	Miahuatlán	3,375	3,356	+0.6%	70.0	27.0	48.2/km^{2} (124.9/sq mi)	March 15, 1825
Santa Lucía Monteverde	Santa Lucía Monteverde	Putla	6,726	6,678	+0.7%	156.4	60.4	43.0/km^{2} (111.4/sq mi)	March 15, 1825
Santa Lucía Ocotlán	Santa Lucía Ocotlán	Ocotlán	4,173	3,604	+15.8%	11.7	4.5	356.7/km^{2} (923.8/sq mi)	March 15, 1825
Santa Magdalena Jicotlán	Santa Magdalena Jicotlán	Coixtlahuaca	81	93	−12.9%	26.8	10.3	3.0/km^{2} (7.8/sq mi)	March 15, 1825
Santa María Alotepec	Santa María Alotepec	Mixe	2,796	2,778	+0.6%	98.5	38.0	28.4/km^{2} (73.5/sq mi)	March 15, 1825
Santa María Apazco	Santa María Apazco	Nochixtlán	1,629	1,898	−14.2%	80.5	31.1	20.2/km^{2} (52.4/sq mi)	March 15, 1825
Santa María Atzompa	Santa María Atzompa	Centro	41,921	27,465	+52.6%	31.3	12.1	1,339.3/km^{2} (3,468.8/sq mi)	March 15, 1825
Santa María Camotlán	Santa María Camotlán	Huajuapan	1,713	1,632	+5.0%	95.2	36.8	18.0/km^{2} (46.6/sq mi)	May 6, 1826
Santa María Chachoápam	Santa María Chachoápam	Nochixtlán	761	766	−0.7%	61.8	23.9	12.3/km^{2} (31.9/sq mi)	March 15, 1825
Santa María Chilchotla	Santa María Chilchotla	Teotitlán	21,469	20,584	+4.3%	283.6	109.5	75.7/km^{2} (196.1/sq mi)	March 15, 1825
Santa María Chimalapa	Santa María Chimalapa	Juchitán	9,578	8,506	+12.6%	4,547.1	1,755.6	2.1/km^{2} (5.5/sq mi)	March 15, 1825
Santa María Colotepec	Santa María Colotepec	Pochutla	27,046	22,562	+19.9%	414.4	160.0	65.3/km^{2} (169.0/sq mi)	March 15, 1825
Santa María Cortijo	Santa María Cortijo	Jamiltepec	1,067	1,083	−1.5%	81.3	31.4	13.1/km^{2} (34.0/sq mi)	November 18, 1844
Santa María Coyotepec	Santa María Coyotepec	Centro	3,751	2,772	+35.3%	6.5	2.5	577.1/km^{2} (1,494.6/sq mi)	March 23, 1858
Santa María del Rosario	Santa María del Rosario	Tlaxiaco	499	480	+4.0%	25.2	9.7	19.8/km^{2} (51.3/sq mi)	March 15, 1825
Santa María del Tule	Santa María del Tule	Centro	8,939	8,165	+9.5%	16.8	6.5	532.1/km^{2} (1,378.1/sq mi)	March 15, 1825
Santa María Ecatepec	Santa María Ecatepec	Yautepec	3,418	3,461	−1.2%	540.2	208.6	6.3/km^{2} (16.4/sq mi)	July 28, 1823
Santa María Guelacé	Santa María Guelacé	Tlacolula	908	816	+11.3%	7.4	2.9	122.7/km^{2} (317.8/sq mi)	March 15, 1825
Santa María Guienagati	Santa María Guienagati	Tehuantepec	3,178	3,286	−3.3%	389.3	150.3	8.2/km^{2} (21.1/sq mi)	March 15, 1825
Santa María Huatulco	Santa María Huatulco	Pochutla	50,862	38,629	+31.7%	512.0	197.7	99.3/km^{2} (257.3/sq mi)	March 15, 1825
Santa María Huazolotitlán	Santa María Huazolotitlán	Jamiltepec	11,995	10,794	+11.1%	275.3	106.3	43.6/km^{2} (112.8/sq mi)	May 6, 1826
Santa María Ipalapa	Santa María Ipalapa	Putla	4,878	4,888	−0.2%	167.4	64.6	29.1/km^{2} (75.5/sq mi)	May 6, 1826
Santa María Ixcatlán	Santa María Ixcatlán	Teotitlán	461	516	−10.7%	177.3	68.5	2.6/km^{2} (6.7/sq mi)	March 15, 1825
Santa María Jacatepec (Note: Santa María Jacatepec was merged with Tuxtepec from 1941 to 1942.)	Santa María Jacatepec	Tuxtepec	9,682	9,240	+4.8%	324.3	125.2	29.9/km^{2} (77.3/sq mi)	March 15, 1825
Santa María Jalapa del Marqués	Santa María Jalapa del Marqués	Tehuantepec	11,735	11,888	−1.3%	729.6	281.7	16.1/km^{2} (41.7/sq mi)	March 15, 1825
Santa María Jaltianguis	Santa María Jaltianguis	Ixtlán	592	575	+3.0%	53.9	20.8	11.0/km^{2} (28.4/sq mi)	March 15, 1825
Santa María la Asunción (Note: Santa María la Asunción was originally incorporated as Santa María Jiotes, changing its name on October 16, 1954. It merged with Huautla for a few years, from 1941 to 1944.)	Santa María la Asunción	Teotitlán	3,259	3,252	+0.2%	7.6	2.9	428.8/km^{2} (1,110.6/sq mi)	March 15, 1825
Santa María Lachixío	Santa María Lachixío	Sola de Vega	1,679	1,680	−0.1%	49.6	19.2	33.9/km^{2} (87.7/sq mi)	March 15, 1825
Santa María Mixtequilla	Santa María Mixtequilla	Tehuantepec	4,690	4,442	+5.6%	147.8	57.1	31.7/km^{2} (82.2/sq mi)	March 15, 1825
Santa María Natívitas	Santa María Natívitas	Coixtlahuaca	603	681	−11.5%	43.1	16.6	14.0/km^{2} (36.2/sq mi)	March 15, 1825
Santa María Nduayaco	Santa María Nduayaco	Teposcolula	453	550	−17.6%	76.8	29.7	5.9/km^{2} (15.3/sq mi)	March 15, 1825
Santa María Ozolotepec	Santa María Ozolotepec	Miahuatlán	3,793	3,992	−5.0%	145.3	56.1	26.1/km^{2} (67.6/sq mi)	March 15, 1825
Santa María Pápalo	Santa María Pápalo	Cuicatlán	2,058	2,209	−6.8%	55.8	21.5	36.9/km^{2} (95.5/sq mi)	March 15, 1825
Santa María Peñoles	Santa María Peñoles	Etla	8,967	7,865	+14.0%	233.2	90.0	38.5/km^{2} (99.6/sq mi)	March 15, 1825
Santa María Petapa	Santa María Petapa	Juchitán	16,706	15,387	+8.6%	155.7	60.1	107.3/km^{2} (277.9/sq mi)	March 15, 1825
Santa María Quiegolani	Santa María Quiegolani	Yautepec	2,224	1,770	+25.6%	160.7	62.0	13.8/km^{2} (35.8/sq mi)	March 15, 1825
Santa María Sola	Santa María Sola	Sola de Vega	1,516	1,524	−0.5%	52.0	20.1	29.2/km^{2} (75.5/sq mi)	May 6, 1826
Santa María Tataltepec	Santa María Tataltepec	Tlaxiaco	317	253	+25.3%	37.1	14.3	8.5/km^{2} (22.1/sq mi)	March 15, 1825
Santa María Tecomavaca	Santa María Tecomavaca	Teotitlán	1,830	1,774	+3.2%	371.3	143.4	4.9/km^{2} (12.8/sq mi)	November 18, 1844
Santa María Temaxcalapa	Santa María Temaxcalapa	Villa Alta	903	968	−6.7%	13.2	5.1	68.4/km^{2} (177.2/sq mi)	March 15, 1825
Santa María Temaxcaltepec	Santa María Temaxcaltepec	Juquila	2,694	2,595	+3.8%	34.7	13.4	77.6/km^{2} (201.1/sq mi)	May 6, 1826
Santa María Teopoxco	Santa María Teopoxco	Teotitlán	3,985	4,651	−14.3%	36.7	14.2	108.6/km^{2} (281.2/sq mi)	March 15, 1825
Santa María Tepantlali	Santa María Tepantlali	Mixe	3,576	3,505	+2.0%	84.5	32.6	42.3/km^{2} (109.6/sq mi)	March 15, 1825
Santa María Texcatitlán	Santa María Texcatitlán	Cuicatlán	896	1,113	−19.5%	35.4	13.7	25.3/km^{2} (65.6/sq mi)	March 15, 1825
Santa María Tlahuitoltepec	Santa María Tlahuitoltepec	Mixe	9,653	9,663	−0.1%	153.1	59.1	63.1/km^{2} (163.3/sq mi)	March 15, 1825
Santa María Tlalixtac (Note: Santa María Tlalixtac was originally incorporated as Magdalena Jalixta, changing its name on May 6, 1826.)	Santa María Tlalixtac	Cuicatlán	1,839	1,754	+4.8%	24.1	9.3	76.3/km^{2} (197.6/sq mi)	March 15, 1825
Santa María Tonameca	Santa María Tonameca	Pochutla	25,347	24,318	+4.2%	520.7	201.0	48.7/km^{2} (126.1/sq mi)	March 15, 1825
Santa María Totolapilla	Santa María Totolapilla	Tehuantepec	812	896	−9.4%	114.0	44.0	7.1/km^{2} (18.4/sq mi)	March 15, 1825
Santa María Xadani	Santa María Xadani	Juchitán	9,234	7,781	+18.7%	86.1	33.2	107.2/km^{2} (277.8/sq mi)	December 15, 1942
Santa María Yalina	Santa María Yalina	Villa Alta	250	354	−29.4%	48.2	18.6	5.2/km^{2} (13.4/sq mi)	March 15, 1825
Santa María Yavesía	Santa María Yavesía	Ixtlán	434	448	−3.1%	87.6	33.8	5.0/km^{2} (12.8/sq mi)	March 15, 1825
Santa María Yolotepec	Santa María Yolotepec	Tlaxiaco	481	461	+4.3%	17.9	6.9	26.9/km^{2} (69.6/sq mi)	March 15, 1825
Santa María Yosoyúa	Santa María Yosoyúa	Tlaxiaco	1,699	1,642	+3.5%	33.6	13.0	50.6/km^{2} (131.0/sq mi)	November 18, 1844
Santa María Yucuhiti	Santa María Yucuhiti	Tlaxiaco	6,008	6,551	−8.3%	73.0	28.2	82.3/km^{2} (213.2/sq mi)	March 15, 1825
Santa María Zacatepec	Santa María Zacatepec	Putla	17,100	15,076	+13.4%	500.8	193.4	34.1/km^{2} (88.4/sq mi)	May 6, 1826
Santa María Zaniza	Santa María Zaniza	Sola de Vega	2,469	2,009	+22.9%	157.5	60.8	15.7/km^{2} (40.6/sq mi)	March 15, 1825
Santa María Zoquitlán	Santa María Zoquitlán	Tlacolula	3,294	3,359	−1.9%	415.7	160.5	7.9/km^{2} (20.5/sq mi)	March 15, 1825
Santiago Amoltepec	Santiago Amoltepec	Sola de Vega	13,855	12,313	+12.5%	207.3	80.0	66.8/km^{2} (173.1/sq mi)	May 6, 1826
Santiago Apoala	Santiago Apoala	Nochixtlán	1,019	1,053	−3.2%	85.8	33.1	11.9/km^{2} (30.8/sq mi)	March 15, 1825
Santiago Apóstol (Note: Santiago Apóstol was originally incorporated as Santiago Ocotlán, changing its name on November 18, 1844.)	Santiago Apóstol	Ocotlán	4,421	4,220	+4.8%	17.6	6.8	251.2/km^{2} (650.6/sq mi)	March 15, 1825
Santiago Astata	Santiago Astata	Tehuantepec	3,918	3,915	+0.1%	186.0	71.8	21.1/km^{2} (54.6/sq mi)	March 15, 1825
Santiago Atitlán	Santiago Atitlán	Mixe	3,556	3,180	+11.8%	70.8	27.3	50.2/km^{2} (130.1/sq mi)	March 15, 1825
Santiago Ayuquililla	Santiago Ayuquililla	Huajuapan	2,904	2,748	+5.7%	89.8	34.7	32.3/km^{2} (83.8/sq mi)	May 6, 1826
Santiago Cacaloxtepec (Note: Santiago Cacaloxtepec was merged with Huajuapan from 1937 to 1938.)	Santiago Cacaloxtepec	Huajuapan	1,667	1,686	−1.1%	38.7	14.9	43.1/km^{2} (111.6/sq mi)	May 6, 1826
Santiago Camotlán	Santiago Camotlán	Villa Alta	3,346	3,395	−1.4%	312.1	120.5	10.7/km^{2} (27.8/sq mi)	March 15, 1825
Santiago Choápam	Santiago Choápam	Choápam	5,242	5,413	−3.2%	311.1	120.1	16.8/km^{2} (43.6/sq mi)	March 15, 1825
Santiago Comaltepec	Santiago Comaltepec	Ixtlán	1,157	1,115	+3.8%	204.1	78.8	5.7/km^{2} (14.7/sq mi)	March 15, 1825
Santiago del Río	Santiago del Río	Silacayoápam	527	614	−14.2%	38.4	14.8	13.7/km^{2} (35.5/sq mi)	May 6, 1826
Santiago Huajolotitlán	Santiago Huajolotitlán	Huajuapan	4,600	4,350	+5.7%	110.7	42.7	41.6/km^{2} (107.6/sq mi)	May 6, 1826
Santiago Huauclilla	Santiago Huauclilla	Nochixtlán	525	663	−20.8%	100.8	38.9	5.2/km^{2} (13.5/sq mi)	March 15, 1825
Santiago Ihuitlán Plumas	Santiago Ihuitlán Plumas	Coixtlahuaca	341	480	−29.0%	46.2	17.8	7.4/km^{2} (19.1/sq mi)	March 14, 1868
Santiago Ixcuintepec	Santiago Ixcuintepec	Mixe	1,636	1,568	+4.3%	122.1	47.1	13.4/km^{2} (34.7/sq mi)	March 15, 1825
Santiago Ixtayutla	Santiago Ixtayutla	Jamiltepec	13,880	11,917	+16.5%	456.1	176.1	30.4/km^{2} (78.8/sq mi)	May 6, 1826
Santiago Jamiltepec	Santiago Jamiltepec	Jamiltepec	19,112	18,383	+4.0%	637.9	246.3	30.0/km^{2} (77.6/sq mi)	July 28, 1823
Santiago Jocotepec	Santiago Jocotepec	Choápam	14,198	13,568	+4.6%	618.8	238.9	22.9/km^{2} (59.4/sq mi)	March 15, 1825
Santiago Juxtlahuaca	Santiago Juxtlahuaca	Juxtlahuaca	34,735	32,927	+5.5%	774.1	298.9	44.9/km^{2} (116.2/sq mi)	July 28, 1823
Santiago Lachiguiri	Santiago Lachiguiri	Tehuantepec	4,394	4,693	−6.4%	433.0	167.2	10.1/km^{2} (26.3/sq mi)	March 15, 1825
Santiago Lalopa	Santiago Lalopa	Villa Alta	431	496	−13.1%	25.6	9.9	16.8/km^{2} (43.6/sq mi)	March 15, 1825
Santiago Laollaga	Santiago Laollaga	Tehuantepec	3,361	3,198	+5.1%	263.1	101.6	12.8/km^{2} (33.1/sq mi)	March 15, 1825
Santiago Laxopa	Santiago Laxopa	Ixtlán	1,291	1,394	−7.4%	117.3	45.3	11.0/km^{2} (28.5/sq mi)	March 15, 1825
Santiago Llano Grande	Santiago Llano Grande	Jamiltepec	3,440	3,260	+5.5%	110.4	42.6	31.2/km^{2} (80.7/sq mi)	October 23, 1891
Santiago Matatlán	Santiago Matatlán	Tlacolula	10,175	9,653	+5.4%	183.8	71.0	55.4/km^{2} (143.4/sq mi)	March 15, 1825
Santiago Miltepec	Santiago Miltepec	Huajuapan	421	409	+2.9%	51.8	20.0	8.1/km^{2} (21.0/sq mi)	May 6, 1826
Santiago Minas	Santiago Minas	Sola de Vega	1,327	1,430	−7.2%	198.2	76.5	6.7/km^{2} (17.3/sq mi)	May 6, 1826
Santiago Nacaltepec	Santiago Nacaltepec	Cuicatlán	1,599	1,913	−16.4%	204.5	79.0	7.8/km^{2} (20.3/sq mi)	March 15, 1825
Santiago Nejapilla	Santiago Nejapilla	Teposcolula	174	219	−20.5%	20.5	7.9	8.5/km^{2} (22.0/sq mi)	March 15, 1825
Santiago Niltepec	Santiago Niltepec	Juchitán	5,342	5,353	−0.2%	547.6	211.4	9.8/km^{2} (25.3/sq mi)	March 15, 1825
Santiago Nundiche	Santiago Nundiche	Tlaxiaco	1,351	967	+39.7%	71.3	27.5	18.9/km^{2} (49.1/sq mi)	March 15, 1825
Santiago Nuyoó	Santiago Nuyoó	Tlaxiaco	1,898	1,966	−3.5%	58.1	22.4	32.7/km^{2} (84.6/sq mi)	March 15, 1825
Santiago Pinotepa Nacional	Santiago Pinotepa Nacional	Jamiltepec	55,840	50,309	+11.0%	804.5	310.6	69.4/km^{2} (179.8/sq mi)	May 6, 1826
Santiago Suchilquitongo (Note: Santiago Suchilquitongo was originally incorporated as Santiago Huitzo, changing its name on November 18, 1844.)	Santiago Suchilquitongo	Etla	10,886	9,542	+14.1%	95.5	36.9	114.0/km^{2} (295.2/sq mi)	May 6, 1826
Santiago Tamazola	Santiago Tamazola	Silacayoápam	4,458	4,207	+6.0%	201.2	77.7	22.2/km^{2} (57.4/sq mi)	May 6, 1826
Santiago Tapextla	Santiago Tapextla	Jamiltepec	3,134	3,031	+3.4%	128.8	49.7	24.3/km^{2} (63.0/sq mi)	November 18, 1844
Santiago Tenango	Santiago Tenango	Etla	1,966	1,945	+1.1%	109.1	42.1	18.0/km^{2} (46.7/sq mi)	March 15, 1825
Santiago Tepetlapa	Santiago Tepetlapa	Coixtlahuaca	130	131	−0.8%	13.6	5.3	9.6/km^{2} (24.8/sq mi)	March 15, 1825
Santiago Tetepec	Santiago Tetepec	Jamiltepec	4,909	4,953	−0.9%	290.9	112.3	16.9/km^{2} (43.7/sq mi)	May 6, 1826
Santiago Texcalcingo	Santiago Texcalcingo	Teotitlán	2,974	3,076	−3.3%	16.6	6.4	179.2/km^{2} (464.0/sq mi)	March 15, 1825
Santiago Textitlán	Santiago Textitlán	Sola de Vega	4,930	4,170	+18.2%	251.9	97.3	19.6/km^{2} (50.7/sq mi)	May 6, 1826
Santiago Tilantongo	Santiago Tilantongo	Nochixtlán	2,764	3,210	−13.9%	247.7	95.6	11.2/km^{2} (28.9/sq mi)	March 15, 1825
Santiago Tillo	Santiago Tillo	Nochixtlán	545	553	−1.4%	17.1	6.6	31.9/km^{2} (82.5/sq mi)	March 15, 1825
Santiago Tlazoyaltepec	Santiago Tlazoyaltepec	Etla	6,300	4,894	+28.7%	63.1	24.4	99.8/km^{2} (258.6/sq mi)	March 15, 1825
Santiago Xanica	Santiago Xanica	Miahuatlán	3,029	2,884	+5.0%	137.2	53.0	22.1/km^{2} (57.2/sq mi)	March 15, 1825
Santiago Xiacuí	Santiago Xiacuí	Ixtlán	1,893	2,171	−12.8%	63.3	24.4	29.9/km^{2} (77.5/sq mi)	November 18, 1844
Santiago Yaitepec	Santiago Yaitepec	Juquila	4,233	4,122	+2.7%	41.0	15.8	103.2/km^{2} (267.4/sq mi)	May 6, 1826
Santiago Yaveo	Santiago Yaveo	Choápam	7,593	6,665	+13.9%	1,024.2	395.4	7.4/km^{2} (19.2/sq mi)	March 15, 1825
Santiago Yolomécatl	Santiago Yolomécatl	Teposcolula	1,922	2,021	−4.9%	66.9	25.8	28.7/km^{2} (74.4/sq mi)	March 15, 1825
Santiago Yosondúa	Santiago Yosondúa	Tlaxiaco	7,991	7,883	+1.4%	334.1	129.0	23.9/km^{2} (61.9/sq mi)	March 15, 1825
Santiago Yucuyachi	Santiago Yucuyachi	Silacayoápam	998	940	+6.2%	50.1	19.3	19.9/km^{2} (51.6/sq mi)	May 6, 1826
Santiago Zacatepec	Santiago Zacatepec	Mixe	5,089	5,515	−7.7%	213.0	82.2	23.9/km^{2} (61.9/sq mi)	March 15, 1825
Santiago Zoochila	Santiago Zoochila	Villa Alta	425	374	+13.6%	8.2	3.2	51.8/km^{2} (134.2/sq mi)	March 15, 1825
Santo Domingo Albarradas	Santo Domingo Albarradas	Tlacolula	798	782	+2.0%	43.6	16.8	18.3/km^{2} (47.4/sq mi)	May 6, 1826
Santo Domingo Armenta	Santo Domingo Armenta	Jamiltepec	3,155	3,224	−2.1%	143.7	55.5	22.0/km^{2} (56.9/sq mi)	September 25, 1842
Santo Domingo Chihuitán	Santo Domingo Chihuitán	Tehuantepec	1,618	1,521	+6.4%	71.1	27.5	22.8/km^{2} (58.9/sq mi)	May 6, 1826
Santo Domingo de Morelos	Santo Domingo de Morelos	Pochutla	11,384	10,547	+7.9%	105.3	40.7	108.1/km^{2} (280.0/sq mi)	October 5, 1946
Santo Domingo Ingenio	Santo Domingo Ingenio	Juchitán	7,681	7,554	+1.7%	199.2	76.9	38.6/km^{2} (99.9/sq mi)	May 20, 1939
Santo Domingo Ixcatlán	Santo Domingo Ixcatlán	Tlaxiaco	760	877	−13.3%	17.9	6.9	42.5/km^{2} (110.0/sq mi)	March 15, 1825
Santo Domingo Nuxaá (Note: Santo Domingo Nuxaá was originally incorporated as Santo Domingo Jaltepec, changing its name on November 18, 1844.)	Santo Domingo Nuxaá	Nochixtlán	3,335	3,610	−7.6%	146.3	56.5	22.8/km^{2} (59.0/sq mi)	March 15, 1825
Santo Domingo Ozolotepec	Santo Domingo Ozolotepec	Miahuatlán	1,101	913	+20.6%	64.2	24.8	17.1/km^{2} (44.4/sq mi)	March 15, 1825
Santo Domingo Petapa	Santo Domingo Petapa	Juchitán	9,027	8,394	+7.5%	339.7	131.2	26.6/km^{2} (68.8/sq mi)	March 15, 1825
Santo Domingo Roayaga	Santo Domingo Roayaga	Villa Alta	941	997	−5.6%	56.2	21.7	16.7/km^{2} (43.4/sq mi)	March 15, 1825
Santo Domingo Tehuantepec	Santo Domingo Tehuantepec	Tehuantepec	67,739	61,872	+9.5%	1,197.7	462.4	56.6/km^{2} (146.5/sq mi)	October 14, 1823
Santo Domingo Teojomulco	Santo Domingo Teojomulco	Sola de Vega	5,260	4,571	+15.1%	224.5	86.7	23.4/km^{2} (60.7/sq mi)	May 6, 1826
Santo Domingo Tepuxtepec	Santo Domingo Tepuxtepec	Mixe	6,029	5,194	+16.1%	113.6	43.9	53.1/km^{2} (137.5/sq mi)	March 15, 1825
Santo Domingo Tlatayápam	Santo Domingo Tlatayápam	Teposcolula	113	153	−26.1%	11.8	4.6	9.6/km^{2} (24.8/sq mi)	March 15, 1825
Santo Domingo Tomaltepec	Santo Domingo Tomaltepec	Centro	3,386	2,790	+21.4%	30.5	11.8	111.0/km^{2} (287.5/sq mi)	March 15, 1825
Santo Domingo Tonalá	Santo Domingo Tonalá	Huajuapan	7,393	7,153	+3.4%	165.7	64.0	44.6/km^{2} (115.6/sq mi)	May 6, 1826
Santo Domingo Tonaltepec	Santo Domingo Tonaltepec	Teposcolula	250	276	−9.4%	26.5	10.2	9.4/km^{2} (24.4/sq mi)	March 15, 1825
Santo Domingo Xagacía	Santo Domingo Xagacía	Villa Alta	1,205	1,213	−0.7%	56.4	21.8	21.4/km^{2} (55.3/sq mi)	March 15, 1825
Santo Domingo Yanhuitlán	Santo Domingo Yanhuitlán	Nochixtlán	1,633	1,609	+1.5%	69.6	26.9	23.5/km^{2} (60.8/sq mi)	March 15, 1825
Santo Domingo Yodohino	Santo Domingo Yodohino	Huajuapan	327	369	−11.4%	36.4	14.1	9.0/km^{2} (23.3/sq mi)	May 6, 1826
Santo Domingo Zanatepec	Santo Domingo Zanatepec	Juchitán	12,483	11,218	+11.3%	646.2	249.5	19.3/km^{2} (50.0/sq mi)	March 15, 1825
Santo Tomás Jalieza	Santo Tomás Jalieza	Ocotlán	3,923	3,385	+15.9%	70.1	27.1	56.0/km^{2} (144.9/sq mi)	March 15, 1825
Santo Tomás Mazaltepec (Note: Santo Tomás Mazaltepec was originally incorporated as Santo Tomás Zautla, changing its name on May 6, 1826.)	Santo Tomás Mazaltepec	Etla	2,612	2,333	+12.0%	44.0	17.0	59.4/km^{2} (153.8/sq mi)	March 15, 1825
Santo Tomás Ocotepec	Santo Tomás Ocotepec	Tlaxiaco	4,066	4,076	−0.2%	80.0	30.9	50.8/km^{2} (131.6/sq mi)	March 15, 1825
Santo Tomás Tamazulapan	Santo Tomás Tamazulapan	Miahuatlán	2,726	2,191	+24.4%	66.6	25.7	40.9/km^{2} (106.0/sq mi)	March 15, 1825
Santos Reyes Nopala	Santos Reyes Nopala	Juquila	16,688	15,986	+4.4%	226.1	87.3	73.8/km^{2} (191.2/sq mi)	May 6, 1826
Santos Reyes Pápalo	Santos Reyes Pápalo	Cuicatlán	2,490	2,829	−12.0%	83.4	32.2	29.9/km^{2} (77.3/sq mi)	March 15, 1825
Santos Reyes Tepejillo	Santos Reyes Tepejillo	Juxtlahuaca	904	1,213	−25.5%	53.0	20.5	17.1/km^{2} (44.2/sq mi)	May 6, 1826
Santos Reyes Yucuná	Santos Reyes Yucuná	Huajuapan	1,474	1,332	+10.7%	60.9	23.5	24.2/km^{2} (62.7/sq mi)	May 6, 1826
Silacayoápam	Silacayoápam	Silacayoápam	6,710	6,747	−0.5%	431.6	166.6	15.5/km^{2} (40.3/sq mi)	May 6, 1826
Sitio de Xitlapehua	Sitio de Xitlapehua	Miahuatlán	713	705	+1.1%	18.2	7.0	39.2/km^{2} (101.5/sq mi)	October 23, 1891
Soledad Etla	Soledad Etla	Etla	6,348	5,025	+26.3%	12.5	4.8	507.8/km^{2} (1,315.3/sq mi)	March 15, 1825
Tamazulápam del Espíritu Santo	Tamazulápam del Espíritu Santo	Mixe	7,185	7,362	−2.4%	112.0	43.2	64.2/km^{2} (166.2/sq mi)	March 15, 1825
Tanetze	Tanetze de Zaragoza	Villa Alta	1,558	1,707	−8.7%	22.5	8.7	69.2/km^{2} (179.3/sq mi)	March 15, 1825
Taniche	Taniche	Ejutla	887	746	+18.9%	10.8	4.2	82.1/km^{2} (212.7/sq mi)	October 23, 1891
Tataltepec	Tataltepec de Valdés	Juquila	6,386	5,561	+14.8%	220.3	85.1	29.0/km^{2} (75.1/sq mi)	May 6, 1826
Teococuilco	Teococuilco de Marcos Pérez	Ixtlán	1,032	1,106	−6.7%	133.1	51.4	7.8/km^{2} (20.1/sq mi)	July 28, 1823
Teotitlán de Flores Magón	Teotitlán de Flores Magón	Teotitlán	10,099	8,966	+12.6%	144.0	55.6	70.1/km^{2} (181.6/sq mi)	July 28, 1823
Teotitlán del Valle	Teotitlán del Valle	Tlacolula	6,392	5,638	+13.4%	107.9	41.7	59.2/km^{2} (153.4/sq mi)	July 28, 1823
Teotongo	Teotongo	Teposcolula	1,005	951	+5.7%	45.8	17.7	21.9/km^{2} (56.8/sq mi)	March 15, 1825
Tepelmeme Villa de Morelos (Note: Tepelmeme Villa de Morelos was originally incorporated as Santo Domingo Tepessese, changing its name on May 6, 1826.)	Tepelmeme Villa de Morelos	Coixtlahuaca	1,960	1,734	+13.0%	574.2	221.7	3.4/km^{2} (8.8/sq mi)	March 15, 1825
Tlacolula	Tlacolula de Matamoros	Tlacolula	30,254	19,625	+54.2%	135.7	52.4	222.9/km^{2} (577.4/sq mi)	March 15, 1825
Tlacotepec Plumas	Tlacotepec Plumas	Coixtlahuaca	410	510	−19.6%	55.9	21.6	7.3/km^{2} (19.0/sq mi)	March 14, 1868
Tlalixtac	Tlalixtac de Cabrera	Centro	12,067	9,417	+28.1%	81.5	31.5	148.1/km^{2} (383.5/sq mi)	March 15, 1825
Tlaxiaco	Tlaxiaco	Tlaxiaco	40,123	38,453	+4.3%	346.5	133.8	115.8/km^{2} (299.9/sq mi)	March 15, 1825
Totontepec Villa de Morelos	Totontepec Villa de Morelos	Mixe	5,904	5,598	+5.5%	266.7	103.0	22.1/km^{2} (57.3/sq mi)	March 15, 1825
Trinidad Zaachila	Trinidad Zaachila	Zaachila	3,419	2,653	+28.9%	21.3	8.2	160.5/km^{2} (415.7/sq mi)	March 15, 1825
Unión Hidalgo	Unión Hidalgo	Juchitán	14,542	13,970	+4.1%	112.8	43.6	128.9/km^{2} (333.9/sq mi)	October 26, 1885
Valerio Trujano (Note: Valerio Trujano was originally incorporated as Hacienda de Güendulain, changing its name on October 31, 1925.)	Valerio Trujano	Cuicatlán	1,376	1,543	−10.8%	54.7	21.1	25.2/km^{2} (65.2/sq mi)	October 23, 1891
Villa de Chilapa	Villa de Chilapa de Díaz	Teposcolula	1,815	1,932	−6.1%	174.9	67.5	10.4/km^{2} (26.9/sq mi)	March 15, 1825
Villa de Etla	Villa de Etla	Etla	10,361	9,280	+11.6%	8.2	3.2	1,263.5/km^{2} (3,272.5/sq mi)	March 15, 1825
Villa de Santiago Chazumba	Villa de Santiago Chazumba	Huajuapan	4,877	4,479	+8.9%	325.1	125.5	15.0/km^{2} (38.9/sq mi)	May 6, 1826
Villa de Tamazulápam del Progreso	Villa de Tamazulápam del Progreso	Teposcolula	8,326	7,059	+17.9%	143.9	55.6	57.9/km^{2} (149.9/sq mi)	March 15, 1825
Villa de Tututepec	Villa de Tututepec	Juquila	50,541	43,913	+15.1%	1,215.5	469.3	41.6/km^{2} (107.7/sq mi)	May 6, 1826
Villa de Zaachila	Villa de Zaachila	Zaachila	46,464	34,101	+36.3%	81.4	31.4	570.8/km^{2} (1,478.4/sq mi)	March 15, 1825
Villa Díaz Ordaz (Note: Villa Díaz Ordaz was originally incorporated as Santo Domingo del Valle, changing its name on October 31, 1860.)	Villa Díaz Ordaz	Tlacolula	6,467	6,174	+4.7%	283.3	109.4	22.8/km^{2} (59.1/sq mi)	March 15, 1825
Villa Hidalgo (Note: Villa Hidalgo was originally incorporated as Yalalag, changing its name on November 15, 1917.)	Villa Hidalgo (Yalalag)	Villa Alta	1,885	2,112	−10.7%	59.0	22.8	31.9/km^{2} (82.7/sq mi)	March 15, 1825
Villa Sola de Vega	Villa Sola de Vega	Sola de Vega	12,350	12,525	−1.4%	973.0	375.7	12.7/km^{2} (32.9/sq mi)	March 15, 1825
Villa Talea de Castro	Villa Talea de Castro	Villa Alta	2,011	2,394	−16.0%	61.1	23.6	32.9/km^{2} (85.2/sq mi)	March 15, 1825
Villa Tejúpam de la Unión	Villa Tejúpam de la Unión	Teposcolula	2,419	2,469	−2.0%	141.5	54.6	17.1/km^{2} (44.3/sq mi)	March 15, 1825
Villa Tezoatlán	Villa Tezoatlán de Segura y Luna	Huajuapan	11,465	11,319	+1.3%	486.6	187.9	23.6/km^{2} (61.0/sq mi)	May 6, 1826
Yaxe	Yaxe	Ocotlán	2,954	2,683	+10.1%	60.0	23.2	49.2/km^{2} (127.5/sq mi)	October 23, 1891
Yogana	Yogana	Ejutla	1,245	1,308	−4.8%	65.7	25.4	18.9/km^{2} (49.1/sq mi)	October 23, 1891
Yutanduchi (Note: Yutanduchi merged with San Pedro Teozacalco on December 25, 1937, and regained its independence on May 7, 1955.)	Yutanduchi de Guerrero	Nochixtlán	1,195	1,292	−7.5%	64.1	24.7	18.6/km^{2} (48.3/sq mi)	March 15, 1825
Zapotitlán Lagunas	Zapotitlán Lagunas	Silacayoápam	3,382	3,133	+7.9%	305.4	117.9	11.1/km^{2} (28.7/sq mi)	May 6, 1826
Zapotitlán Palmas	Zapotitlán Palmas	Huajuapan	1,695	1,514	+12.0%	43.8	16.9	38.7/km^{2} (100.2/sq mi)	May 6, 1826
Zimatlán	Zimatlán de Álvarez	Zimatlán	22,093	19,215	+15.0%	353.7	136.6	62.5/km^{2} (161.8/sq mi)	July 28, 1823
Oaxaca	—	—	4,132,148	3,801,962	+8.7%	93,757.6	36,200.0	44.1/km^{2} (114.1/sq mi)	—
Mexico	—	—	126,014,024	112,336,538	+12.2%	1,960,646.7	757,010	64.3/km^{2} (166.5/sq mi)	—
