= San Antonio Cuajimoloyas =

Village in Mexico

Coordinates: 17°07′08″N 96°27′08″W

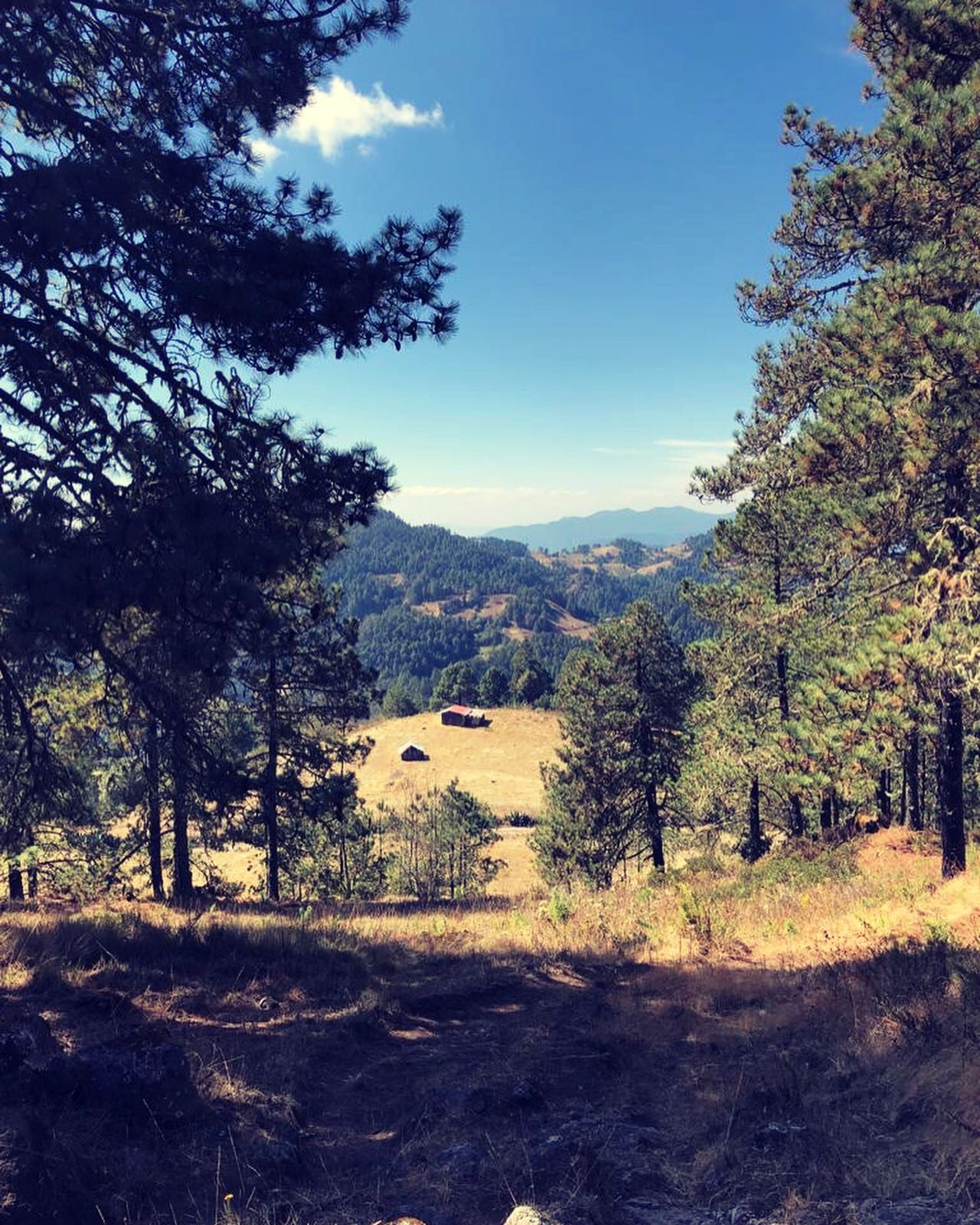
Cuajimoloyas, Mexico

San Antonio Cuajimoloyas (often known simply as Cuajimoloyas) is a village in the Sierra Norte de Oaxaca region in Oaxaca, Mexico. It is located at an elevation of 10,490 feet (3,197 meters).

Cuajimoloyas, along with several other neighboring villages, are collectively known as los pueblos mancomunados, self-governing communities that are mostly inhabited by ethnic Zapotecs. (The other villages include Santa María Yavesía, Santa Catarina Lachatao, San Miguel Amatlán, Benito Juárez, La Neveria, Latuvi, and Llano Grande.) Cuajimoloyas' local economy relies heavily on eco-tourism, and is known for an annual mushroom festival, La Feria Regional del hongos silvestres, held in late July or early August.
