= Comaltepec =

Comaltepec may refer to:

== Geography ==
Places in Oaxaca, Mexico:

- San Juan Comaltepec
- Santiago Comaltepec

== Languages ==
- Comaltepec Chinantec
