= Ixtlán Zapotec =

Zapotec dialect cluster of Oaxaca, Mexico

- Native to: Mexico
- Region: Northern Oaxaca
- Native speakers: (7,000 cited 1990 & 2000 censuses)
- Language family: Oto-Manguean: Zapotecan; Zapotec; Sierra Norte; Sierra Juárez; Ixtlán Zapotec
- Dialects: Yareni; Atepec; Central; Sierra Juárez

Language codes
- ISO 639-3: Either: zae – Yareni (Western) zaa – Central Ixtlán
- Glottolog: yare1249 Yareni sier1250 Sierra de Juarez
- ELP: Ixtlán (shared)

Ixtlán Zapotec is a Zapotec dialect cluster of Oaxaca, Mexico.

Varieties share about 80% mutual intelligibility. They are:

- Yareni (Western Ixtlán, Etla Zapotec), spoken in Santa Ana Yareni.
- Atepec (Macuiltianguis Zapotec), spoken in San Juan Atepec and San Pablo Macuiltianguis.
- Central Ixtlan
- Sierra de Juárez

Yavesía Zapotec (Southeastern Ixtlán) is somewhat more divergent.

Yareni Zapotec speakers can communicate with speakers of related Zapotec variants in the towns of Teococuilco de Marcos Pérez, San Miguel Aloapam, and San Isidro Aloápam (Aloápam Zapotec).

== Sources ==
- Foreman, John. 2006. The Morphosyntax of Subjects in Macuiltianguis Zapotec. Ph.D. Dissertation, UCLA.
- Nellis, Neil and Jane Goodner Nellis. 1983. Diccionario Zapoteco de Juarez. Instituto Lingüístico de Verano. Mexico.
- Bartholomew, Doris A. 1983. Grammatica Zapoteca, in Neil Nellis and Jane Goodner Nellis Diccionario Zapoteco de Juarez Instituto Lingüístico de Verano. Mexico.
- Bickmore, Lee S. and George A. Broadwell. 1998. High tone docking in Sierra Juárez Zapotec. International Journal of American Linguistics, 64:37-67.
- Gibbs, William P. 1977. Discourse elements in Sierra de Juarez Zapotec. M.A. thesis. University of Texas at Arlington.
