= Cora ixtlanensis =

Scientific classification
- Kingdom: Fungi
- Division: Basidiomycota
- Class: Agaricomycetes
- Order: Agaricales
- Family: Hygrophoraceae
- Genus: Cora
- Species: C. ixtlanensis

Binomial name
- Cora ixtlanensis Moncada, R.-E.Pérez & Lücking (2019)

Species of lichen

Cora ixtlanensis is a species of basidiolichen in the family Hygrophoraceae. Found in Mexico, it was formally described as a new species in 2019 by Bibiana Moncada, Rosa Emilia Pérez-Pérez, and Robert Lücking. The type specimen was collected in Cerro Pelón (Santiago Comaltepec, Oaxaca) in a cloud forest at an altitude of 2,990 m (9,810 ft). The lichen is only known from the type locality, where it grows terrestrially. The specific epithet refers to the Ixtlán community in Ixtlán de Juárez, who, according to the authors, are "renowned for their sustainable ecosystem management and ecotourism".
