= Cora casasolana =

Scientific classification
- Kingdom: Fungi
- Division: Basidiomycota
- Class: Agaricomycetes
- Order: Agaricales
- Family: Hygrophoraceae
- Genus: Cora
- Species: C. casasolana

Binomial name
- Cora casasolana B.Moncada, R.-E.Pérez & Lücking (2016)

Species of lichen

Cora casasolana is a species of basidiolichen in the family Hygrophoraceae. Found in Mexico, it was formally described as a new species in 2016 by Bibiana Moncada, Rosa Emilia Pérez, and Robert Lücking. It is only known to occur in the type locality in Santiago Comaltepec, Oaxaca, where it grows on the ground between plants. The species is part of a predominantly endemic Mexican radiation of the genus Cora. The lichen forms rosettes up to ten cm across with dark olive-green lobes that have smooth, wavy surfaces and light yellowish-grey rolled-in edges.

== Taxonomy ==
Cora casasolana is a basidiolichen in the family Hygrophoraceae (order Agaricales). Bibiana Moncada, Ramón-Enrique Pérez and Robert Lücking scientifically described it in 2016 from material collected on Cerro Pelón, Oaxaca, Mexico. The epithet honours José Arturo Casasola González, an Oaxacan entomologist who assisted the fieldwork. Internal transcribed spacer sequence data confirm that the species belongs to the same broad clade as the Andean species C. caliginosa and C. pichinchensis, yet each occupies a separate branch, supporting their recognition as distinct species. Subsequent ITS-based analyses that sampled all known Mexican Cora species revealed that C. casasolana and the likewise Mexican C. totonacorum form a well-supported sister group within one of eleven independent Mexican lineages of Cora. These lineages are scattered across the genus, implying multiple colonisation events from Central and South America and an endemicity rate of 92% at species level in Mexico.

== Description ==
The thallus of Cora casasolana is terricolous and foliose, forming rosettes up to 10 cm across among herbaceous vegetation. It consists of three to seven semicircular lobes, 1–3 cm wide and 1–2 cm long, that ascend slightly and branch sparingly without radial sutures. Fresh lobes are dark olive-green to olive-grey, lacking concentric color rings; the thin, rolled-in (involute) margins are light yellowish-grey, becoming white-grey in the herbarium. The upper surface is even to very shallowly undulate (wavy) when hydrated and becomes undulate-rugose on drying, remaining glabrous throughout. The lower surface lacks a cortex (ecorticate) and exposes a whitish, felty-arachnoid medulla.

In cross-section the thallus is 200–300 micrometres (μm) thick. A viaduct-shaped upper cortex, 20–30 μm deep, overlies a 50–70 μm zone of anticlinal hyphae. The photobiont layer is 100–150 μm thick (orange above, aeruginous-green below); the medulla is 30–60 μm and bears numerous short, partly branched, papilliform hyphae 3–4 μm wide. Clamp connections are absent. No hymenophore has been observed, and thin-layer chromatography revealed no secondary metabolites.

Cora casasolana differs from the epiphytic relatives C. totonacorum and C. haledana by its terrestrial habit; all three share medium-sized olive-to-dark-green lobes and papilliform hyphal appendages on the lower medulla. Within the Mexican fungus it grows sympatrically with C. ixtlanensis but is readily distinguished by its olive-green lobes and conspicuous medullary papillae.

== Habitat and distribution ==
Cora casasolana is so far known only from its type locality at 2,990 m (9,810 ft) elevation on Cerro Pelón, Sierra Juárez de Oaxaca, southern Mexico. It grows on soil among grasses and low shrubs in a mosaic of cloud forest edge and alpine-like shrubby grassland, environments characterized by frequent fog, high humidity and intense ultraviolet radiation. Cerro Pelón is the richest documented Mexican site for Cora, harbouring six species and one subspecies.
