= Zoquiapam =

Zoquiapam may refer to:

- Nuevo Zoquiapam, a town and municipality in Oaxaca in south-western Mexico
- San Lucas Zoquiapam, a town and municipality in Oaxaca in south-western Mexico

== See also ==
- Zoquiapan, a town and municipality in Puebla in south-eastern Mexico
