= Codex of Santa Catarina Ixtepeji =

Bilingual codex in Spanish and Zapotec

The Codex of Santa Catarina Ixtepeji (in Spanish, Códice de Santa Catarina Ixtepeji) is a late 17th-early 18th century bilingual codex in the Spanish and Zapotec languages. It is a 7-foot-long scroll (2.1 m), a hand-painted history and map recounting part of the history of Santa Catarina Ixtepeji, in the Ixtlán District in the Sierra Norte region of Oaxaca in southwestern Mexico. It had been held in the hands of private collectors into the 20th century, and was re-discovered and identified as part of the holdings of the American Geographical Society Library at the University of Wisconsin–Milwaukee in early 2012, as the result of efforts of scholars at UWM, Marquette University and the Universidad Nacional Autónoma de México.

== Background ==
The scroll recounts the history of leadership and land ownership in that particular town in Mexico, and is believed by Marquette's Laura Matthew to have been written in both the local and Spanish languages because its purpose was to regularize land titles and ownership in the eyes of the bureaucracy of the Spanish Empire. The two dates (1691 and 1709 A.D.) inscribed on it, she believes, are the dates it was used as a visual aid in making a presentation to Imperial officials.

== Subsequent history of the Codex ==
The Codex is believed by Zapotec language scholars Michel Oudijk and Sebastián van Doesburg to have been one of two documents from Santa Catarina Ixtepeji which were sold in the early 20th century; specifically, the one sold by a British consular official in Oaxaca named Rickards, a Mexican of Scottish descent, to a Californian mining engineer named A. E. Place. Place, it is now known, sold the Codex in 1917 to the American Geographical Society (AGS) for their library, at that time based in New York City. (In a 1917 letter to the AGS, Place wrote: "Were it not for the fact that I am forging into business here, after having lost nearly all my property in Mexico, I would not sell the map at any price.")

== Possible Existence of an Older Codex ==
In 1984, German ethnologist Viola König began searching for a different, possibly older Codex de Ixtepeji. According to König, this document was reportedly made of leather and measured approximately six to eight meters in length and one meter in height. Her research was prompted by a 1956 publication by Rosendo Pérez García, who described the codex and tracked its movement from the community of Santa Catarina Ixtepeji to the city of Oaxaca between 1908 and 1911. According to Pérez García, the document was sold during that time for 35,000 pesos to a German consul and has since disappeared.

This leather material would distinguish the lost codex from the surviving one, which is made of bark paper mounted on textile, a format typical of post-contact but indigenous Mesoamerican manuscripts.

König was unable to locate the codex in Germany and learned during her fieldwork in Santa Catarina Ixtepeji that no written documents older than 1921 had been preserved locally. She further noted that multiple codices and lienzos once existed in various Mixtec, Zapotec, Chinantec, and Mixe communities of Oaxaca, sometimes containing overlapping or diverging content. This pattern suggests that the existence of more than one codex in Ixtepeji would not have been unusual.

== Rediscovery ==
In 1978, the AGS Library collections, which include over one million items, including books, maps, globes, diaries and other memorabilia accumulated by the society and its members, were brought to University of Wisconsin–Milwaukee's Golda Meir Library from New York; in Milwaukee, curators and librarians have been conducting their own ongoing exploration of the enormous collection ever since. In 1995, AGSL curator Christopher Baruth stumbled across a tattered scroll with both writing and pictures, but without any accession code or other markings which could connect it to any catalog card for the collection. "I had asked someone about it at that time,” he recalls, “but that person didn’t think it was anything of significance."

Meanwhile, just before the turn of the 21st century, Michel Oudijk of the Universidad Nacional Autónoma de México and fellow scholar of Zapotec Sebastián van Doesburg had run across academic reports from the 1960s indicating two documents from Santa Catarina Ixtepeji had been sold in the early 20th century, and had sought them ever since, in various archives of Europe, Mexico, and the United States. Van Doesburg published an article in 2000, based on a low-quality black-and-white snapshot of a corner of the Codex, which picture he had found in the Museo Nacional de Antropología in Mexico City.

In 2011, Baruth was organizing his office in preparation for retirement after 31 years with the AGS Library, including sixteen as curator. A staffer questioned him about the tattered old scroll, and he decided to pursue the mystery. He showed it to associate professor Aims McGuinness of UWM's Department of History, who identified the document as one in both Spanish and an indigenous language he couldn't identify, and in turn consulted with Laura Matthew, a colleague at crosstown Marquette University in downtown Milwaukee, who specializes in colonial Latin America. Laura Matthew, an assistant professor of history, recognized what she describes as "the characteristic look of an indigenous land title from Mexico’s mid-colonial period, a mix of traditional pictographic narration and alphabetic text". She is not an expert in Zapotec, but knew someone who was: Oudijk at the Universidad Nacional Autónoma. He saw e-mailed photos of the Codex, and replied in an e-mail, "Wooooooooooooooowwwwwwww, Es el Códice de Santa Catarina Ixtepeji!!!!!!!!!!!!!!!!!!!!" He knew that was one of the two documents he and van Doesburg had been hunting for so many years.

Matthew recounts, "That’s when we knew we had something valuable... And luck played a part, because [Oudijk] had already studied this type of document and that made for a fast identification." Armed with these clues, Baruth and colleagues found a 1917 letter from Place in the last five-ton batch of archival material from the AGS original home in New York, which had not reached Milwaukee until 2010. Baruth suspects that the Codex was hastily shelved because by the time it was acquired, the resources of the AGS Library were in high demand for documentation in the wake of the end of World War I, and the subsequent treaty negotiations and arguments over boundary and borders.

== Preservation ==
At the urging of Jim DeYoung, senior conservator of the Milwaukee Art Museum, the Codex has been placed into a special frame which DeYoung designed and constructed, and will probably never be rolled up again, in order to prevent further deterioration.
