= Alejandro Santiago Ramírez =

- Born: 22 April 1964; Teococuilco de Marcos Perez, Oaxaca
- Died: 22 July 2013 (aged 49); Oaxaca de Juárez, Oaxaca
- Other name: Alejandro Santiago
- Occupations: Artist, painter, sculptor

Alejandro Santiago Ramírez (April 22, 1964 – July 22, 2013) was a Mexican painter and sculptor best known for his monumental art piece "2501 Migrantes".

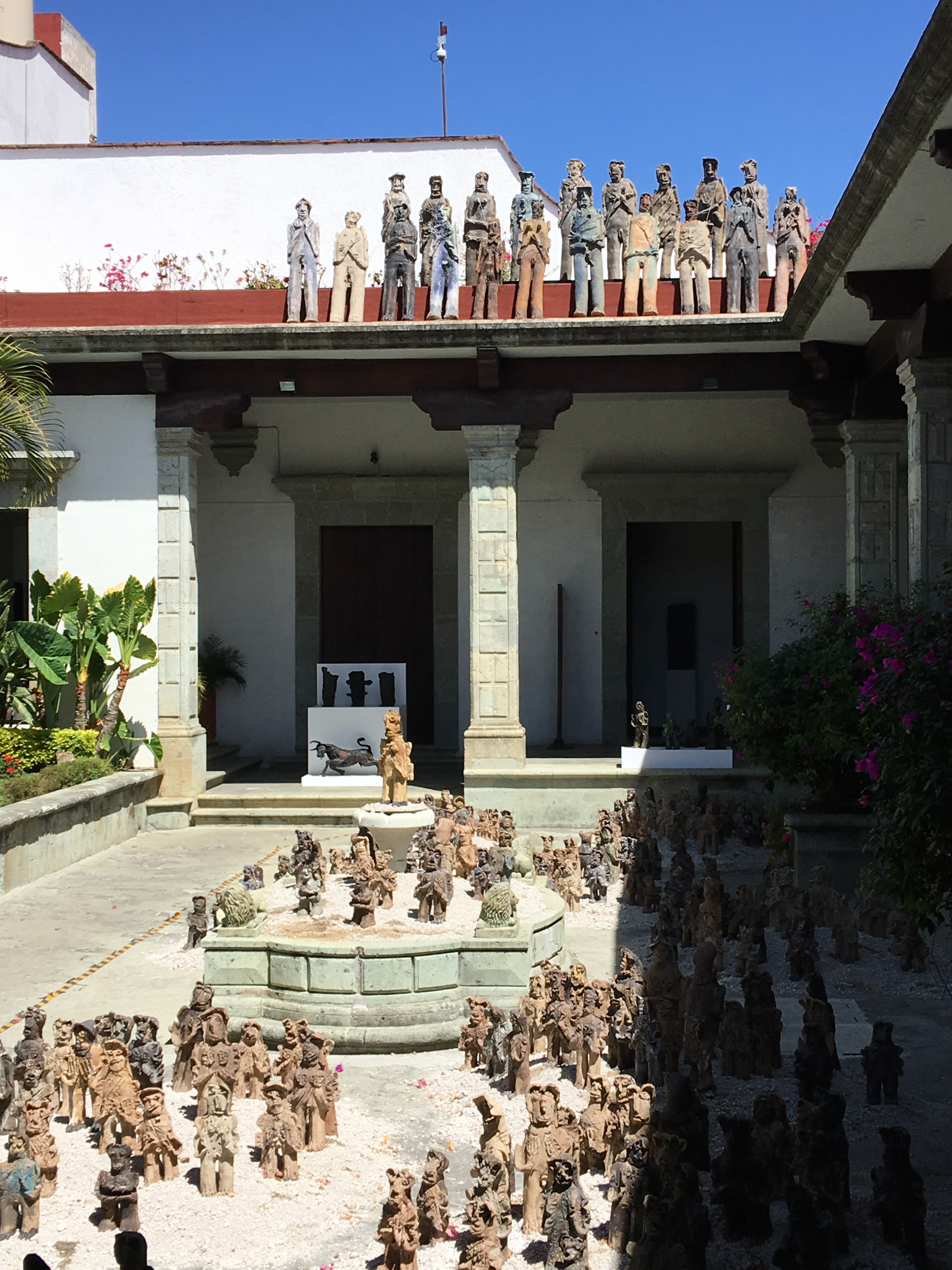
Some of Alejandro Santiago's 2501 Migrantes overlooking Familias Migrantes in the Museo Tamayo courtyard in Oaxaca, Mexico

== Life ==
Alejandro Santiago was born in Teococuilco de Marcos Perez, Oaxaca, 60 km northeast of the city of Oaxaca. When he was 9, he moved with his family to Oaxaca city. Santiago studied at the Centro de Educacion Artistica and was among the first graduates of the Rufino Tamayo Plastic Arts workshop.

After a decade of pursuing his art in the US and Europe and achieving international acclaim, Santiago returned to his hometown. Struck by how few people remained, he "vowed to honor the departed and 'repopulate' his impoverished hometown."

Over six years, beginning in 2002, Santiago realized his vision of a monumental installation art piece that symbolizes the migrants who left village life in rural Mexico in search of jobs in the US. With the help of a grant from the Rockefeller Foundation and a team of more than 30 workers, Santiago crafted "2501 Migrantes" out of clay. The figures fuse characteristics of prehispanic and modern art, each one unique yet maintaining an essence of anonymity.

Using the remaining clay from "2501 Migrantes", Santiago launched a second project featuring migrant families. Each group features one member drawing them to the North, while they are reflecting on what they have left behind. The central courtyard at the Museo Rufino Tamayo, Oaxaca displays a portion of the "Familias Migrantes", with a handful of the original "2501 Migrantes" looking down from above.

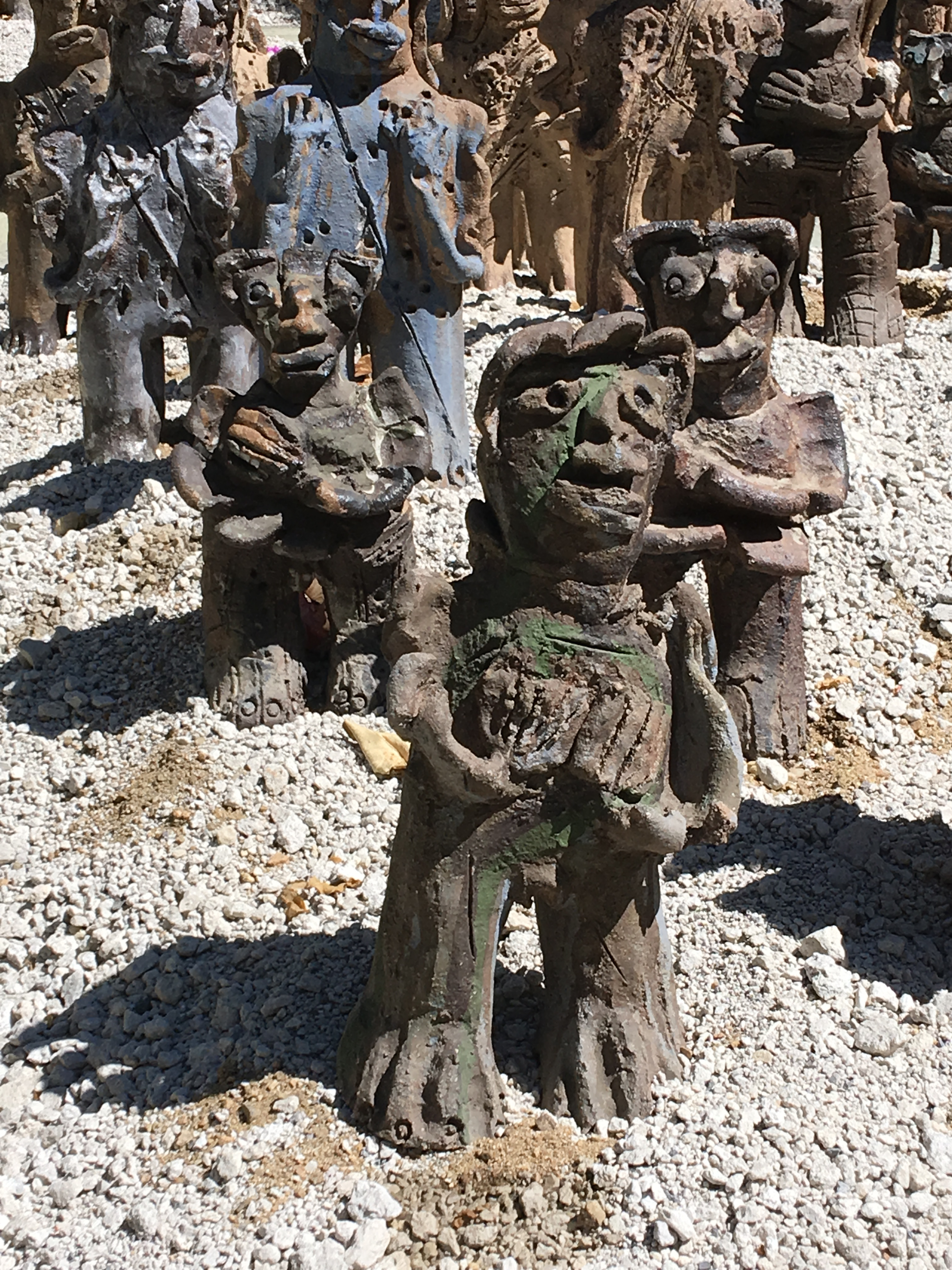
Familias Migrantes by Alejandro Santiago

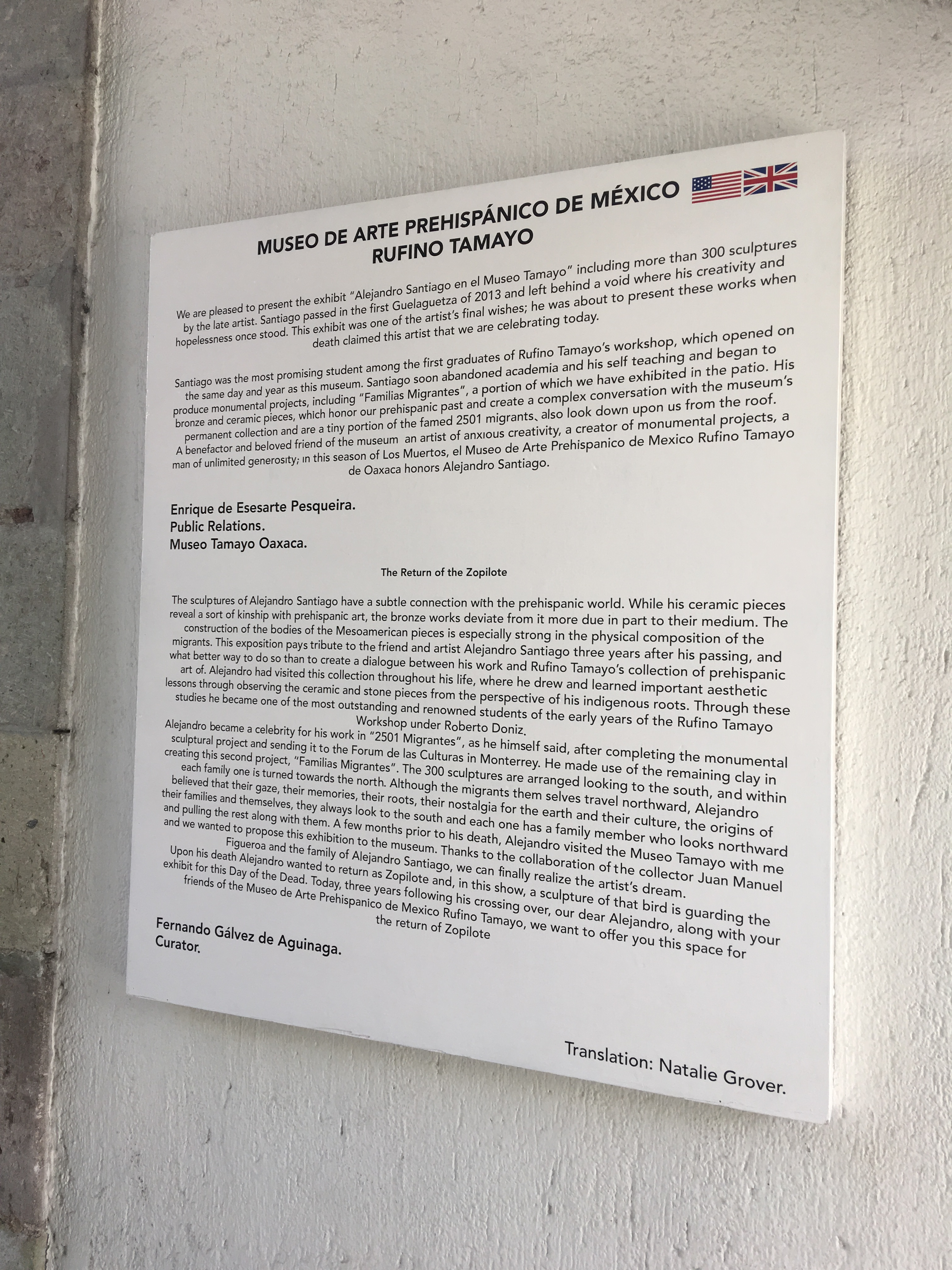
Message from the Curator about the Museum and the displays by Alejandro Santiago

Alejandro Santiago died of a heart attack in 2013. He is survived by his wife Zoila Lopez, son Lucio Santiago, and daughter Alejandra Santiago.
