= Abejones =

- Municipality and town
- Location of Abejones within Oaxaca

- Location in Mexico
- Coordinates: 17°26′N 96°36′W
- Country: Mexico
- State: Oaxaca

Area
  - Total: 122.48 km^{2} (47.29 sq mi)

Population (2005)
  - Total: 1,114
- Time zone: UTC-6 (Central Standard Time)

Abejones (Spanish: meaning "beetles", from abejón) is a town and municipality in Oaxaca in south-western Mexico. The municipality covers an area of 122.48 km^{2}. It is part of the Ixtlán District in the Sierra Norte de Oaxaca region. It shares borders with San Pablo Macuiltianguis to the north, with Santa Ana Yareni and Santa María Jaltianguis to the south, with San Juan Bautista Atatlahuca, San Miguel Aloapam and San Juan Bautista Jayacatlán to the west, and with San Pablo Macuiltianguis, San Juan Atepec and San Juan Evangelista Analco to the east. Its approximately 94 km from the city of Oaxaca. This area has a very uneven terrain and there is no hectare that is a complete level in the whole municipality. The local mountains are called the Sierra Marcos Pérez and some of its mountains reach the three thousand meters. It is quite a dry region but the cold weather helps some fruit trees and forests. The only river near is the Rio Grande. As of 2005, the municipality had a total population of 1,114.

== Toponymy ==
The name Abejones has an interesting meaning and background. There is no actual name in Spanish for the municipality. In Zapotec the name for Abejones is "Beruc-ni" (the name of a type of bird). The name for the municipality was taken in memory of the bird. The bird used to be eaten by primitive communities in this zone of Oaxaca. The municipality is then called "Abejones" because of the quantity of bees (abejas) existing in the zone.
