= Santa María Jaltianguis =

- Municipality and town
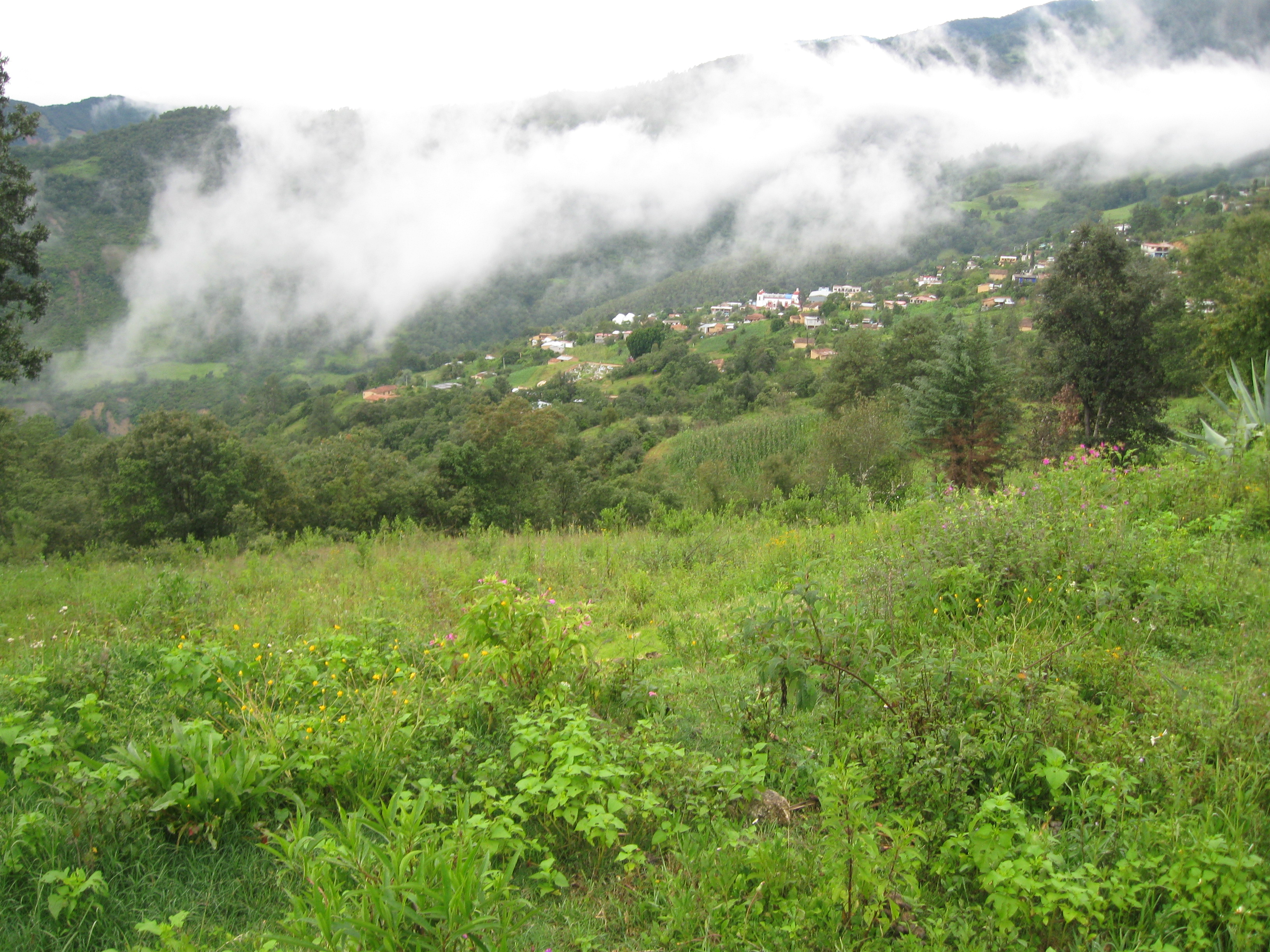

- Location in Mexico
- Coordinates: 17°22′N 96°32′W
- Country: Mexico
- State: Oaxaca

Population (2020)
  - Total: 592
- Time zone: UTC-6 (Central Standard Time)

Santa María Jaltianguis is a town and municipality in Oaxaca in south-western Mexico. The municipality covers an area of km^{2}. It is part of the Ixtlán District in the Sierra Norte region.

As of 2020, the municipality had a total population of 592.
