= Evangelista Analco =

- Municipality and town
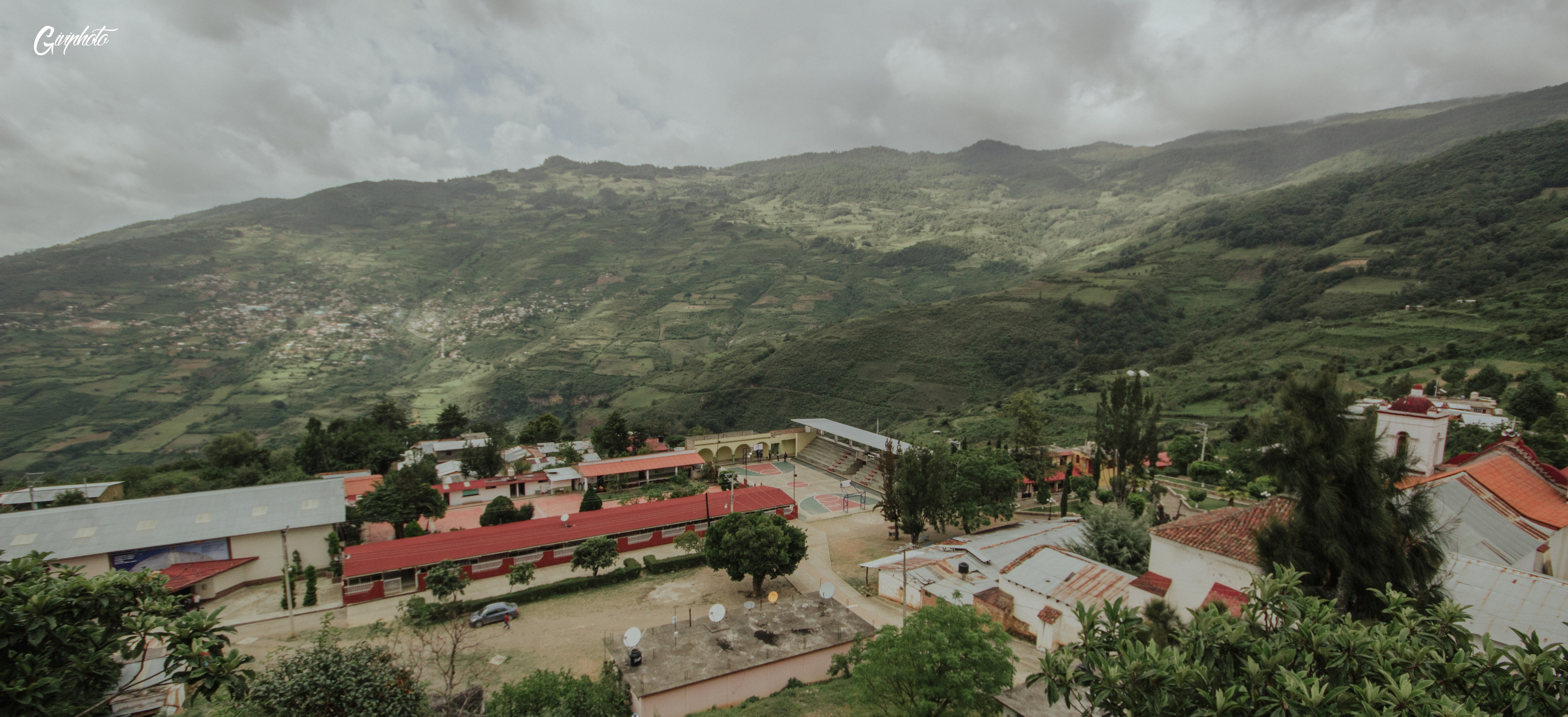

- Location in Mexico
- Coordinates: 17°24′N 96°32′W
- Country: Mexico
- State: Oaxaca

Area
  - Total: 33.17 km^{2} (12.81 sq mi)

Population (2005)
  - Total: 412
- Time zone: UTC-6 (Central Standard Time)

Evangelista Analco (or San Juan Evangelista Analco) is a town and municipality in Oaxaca in south-western Mexico. The municipality covers an area of 33.17 km^{2}. It is part of the Ixtlán District in the Sierra Norte de Oaxaca region.

As of 2005, the municipality had a total population of 412.
