= San Miguel del Río =

- Municipality and town
- Location in Mexico
- Coordinates: 17°19′N 96°34′W
- Country: Mexico
- State: Oaxaca

Area
  - Total: 40.83 km^{2} (15.76 sq mi)

Population (2005)
  - Total: 275
- Time zone: UTC-6 (Central Standard Time)

San Miguel del Río is a town and municipality in Oaxaca in south-western Mexico. The municipality covers an area of 40.83 km^{2}. It is part of the Ixtlán District in the Sierra Norte region.

As of 2005, the municipality had a total population of 275.
