= Ixtlán District =

- District
- Oaxaca regions and districts: Sierra Norte to the Northeast
- Coordinates: 17°19′50″N 96°29′14″W
- Country: Mexico
- State: Oaxaca

Area
  - Land: 2,585 km^{2} (998 sq mi)

Population (2020)
  - Total: 36,084

Ixtlán District is located in the Sierra Norte region, in the northeastern area of the State of Oaxaca, Mexico.

The district includes 26 municipalities, bringing together a total of 161 settlements. At the 2020 census, they contained a total of 36,084 inhabitants, the majority of whom were indigenous Zapotec speakers.

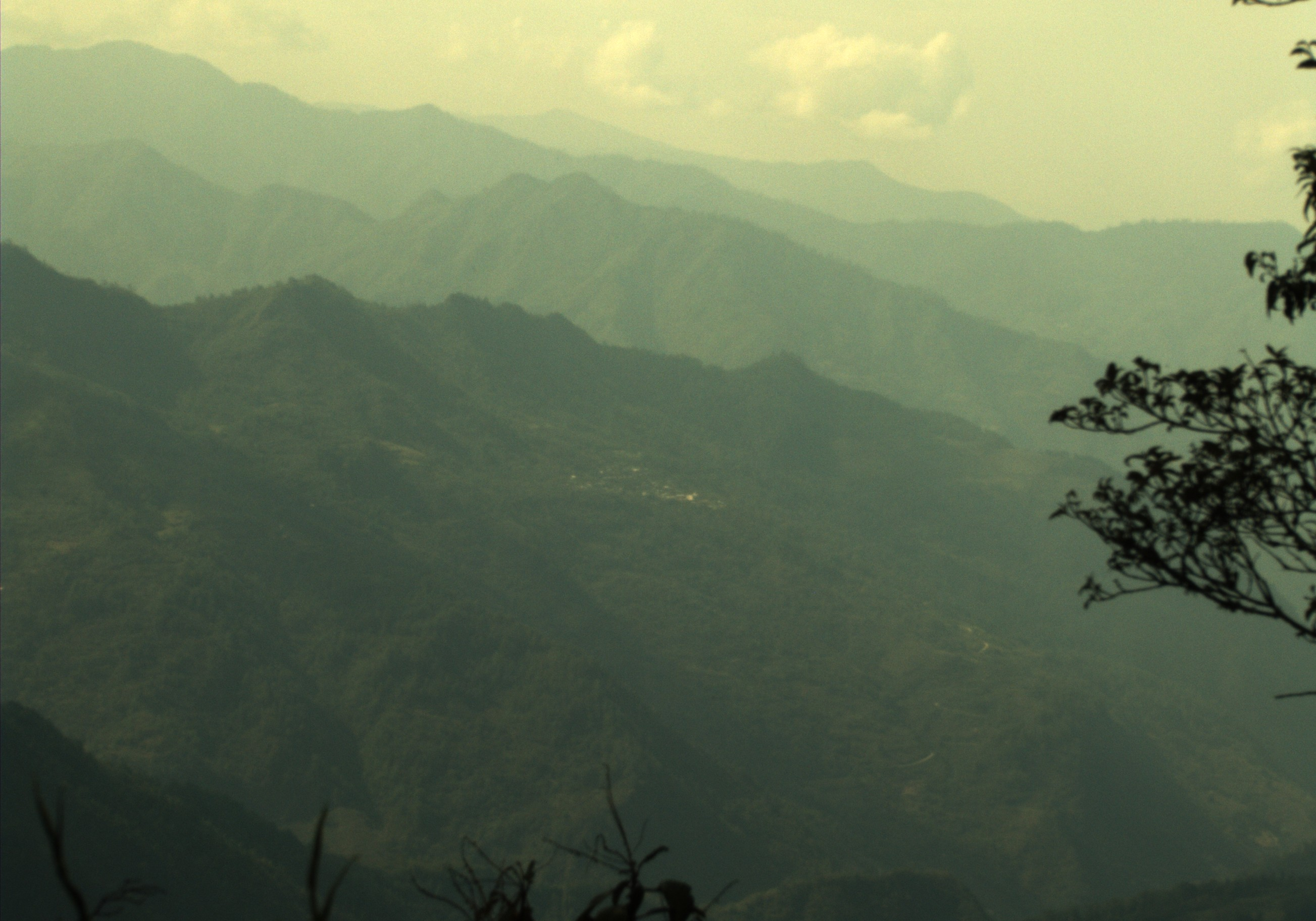
Scenery near Santo Domingo Cacalotepec

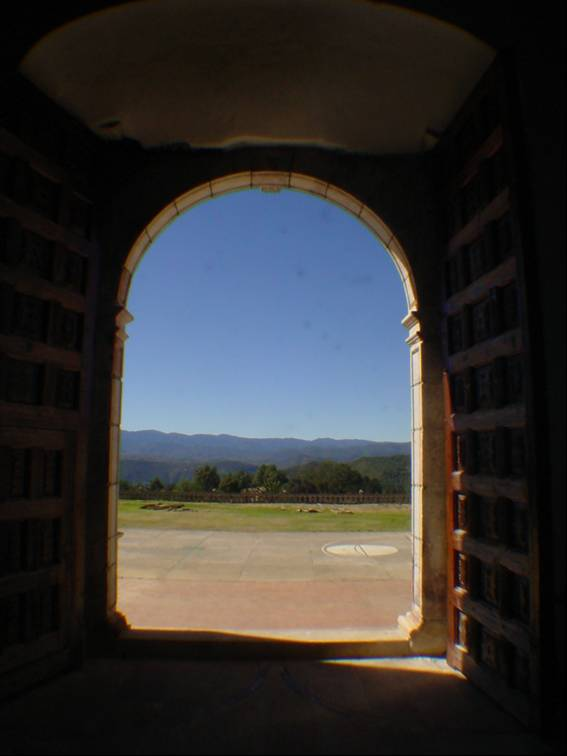
Entrance to church in Capulalpam de Méndez

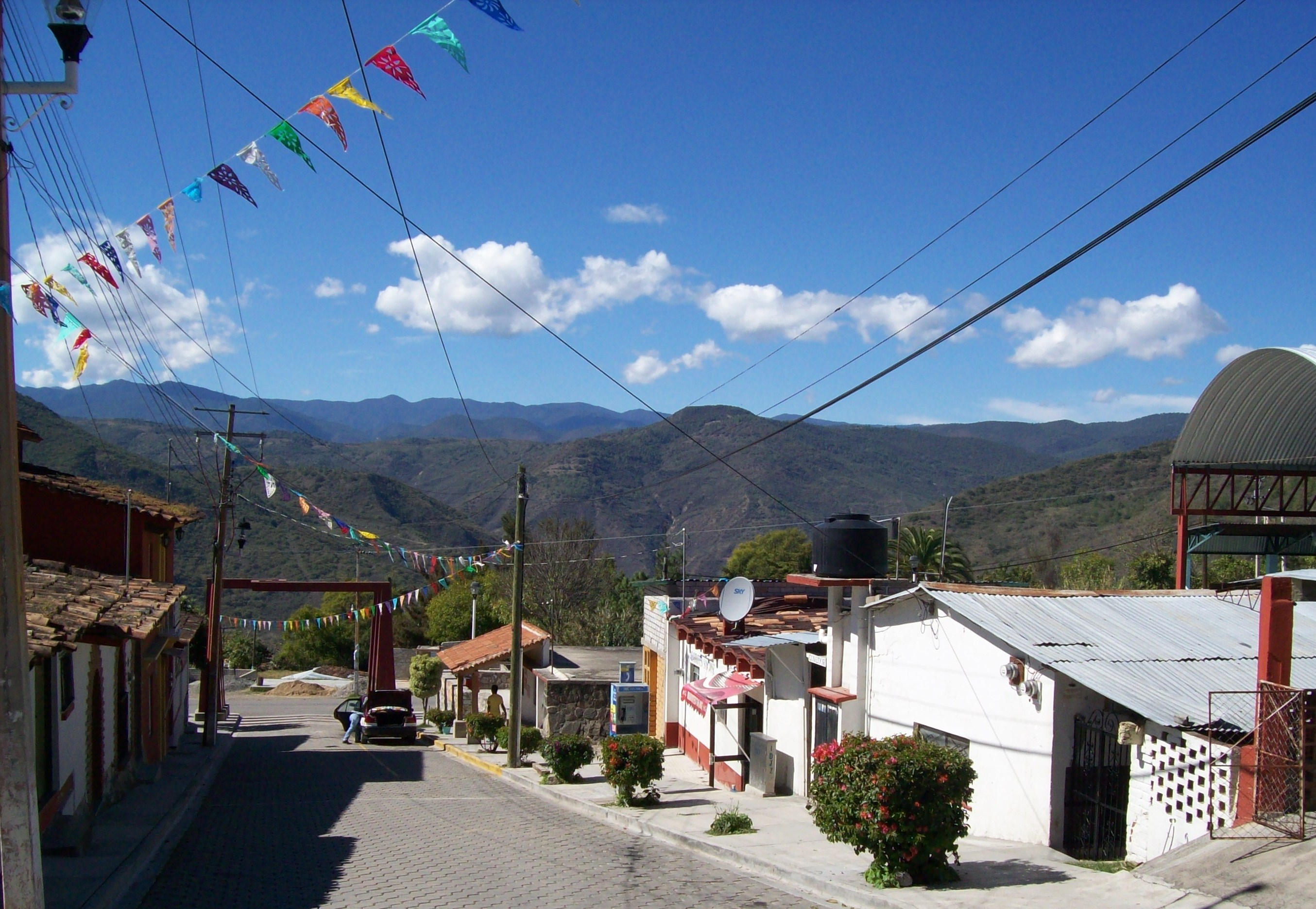
Main street of Guelatao de Juarez

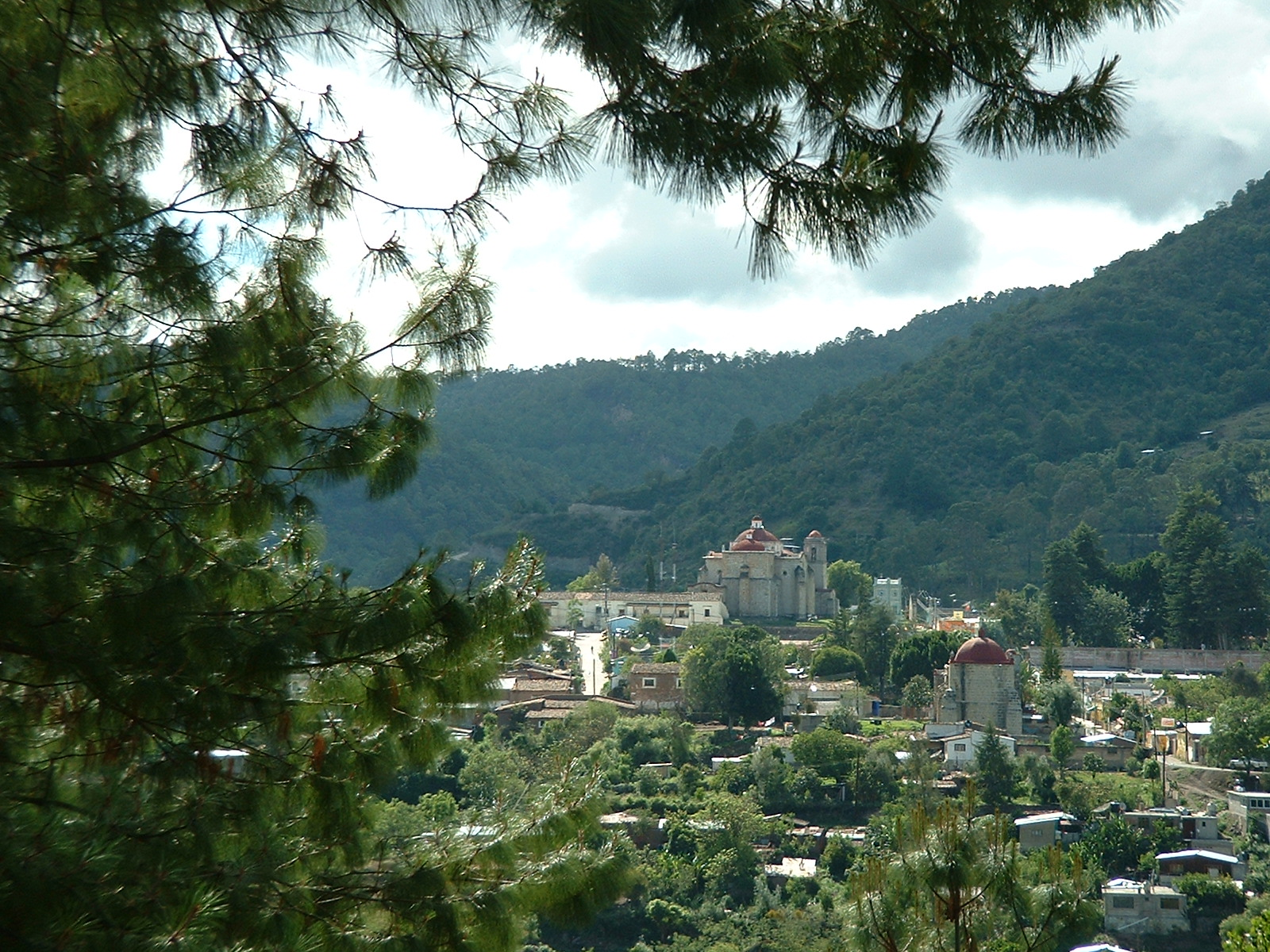
General view of Ixtlan de Juárez

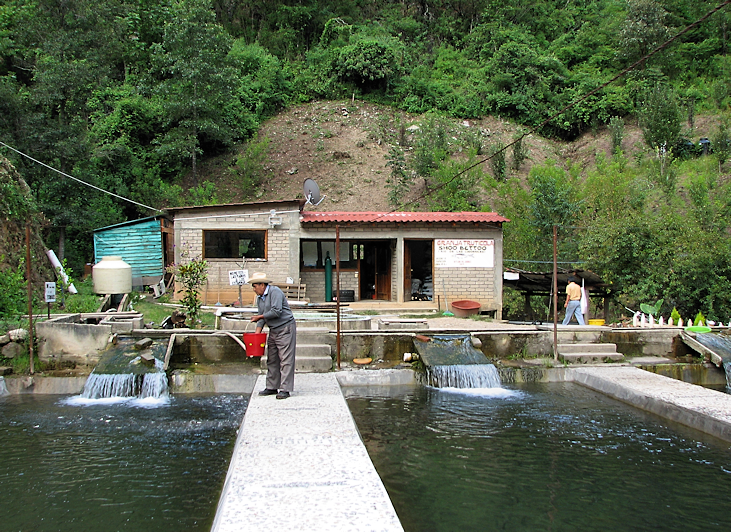
An economically sustainable, community-owned fish farm, located near Ixtlan.

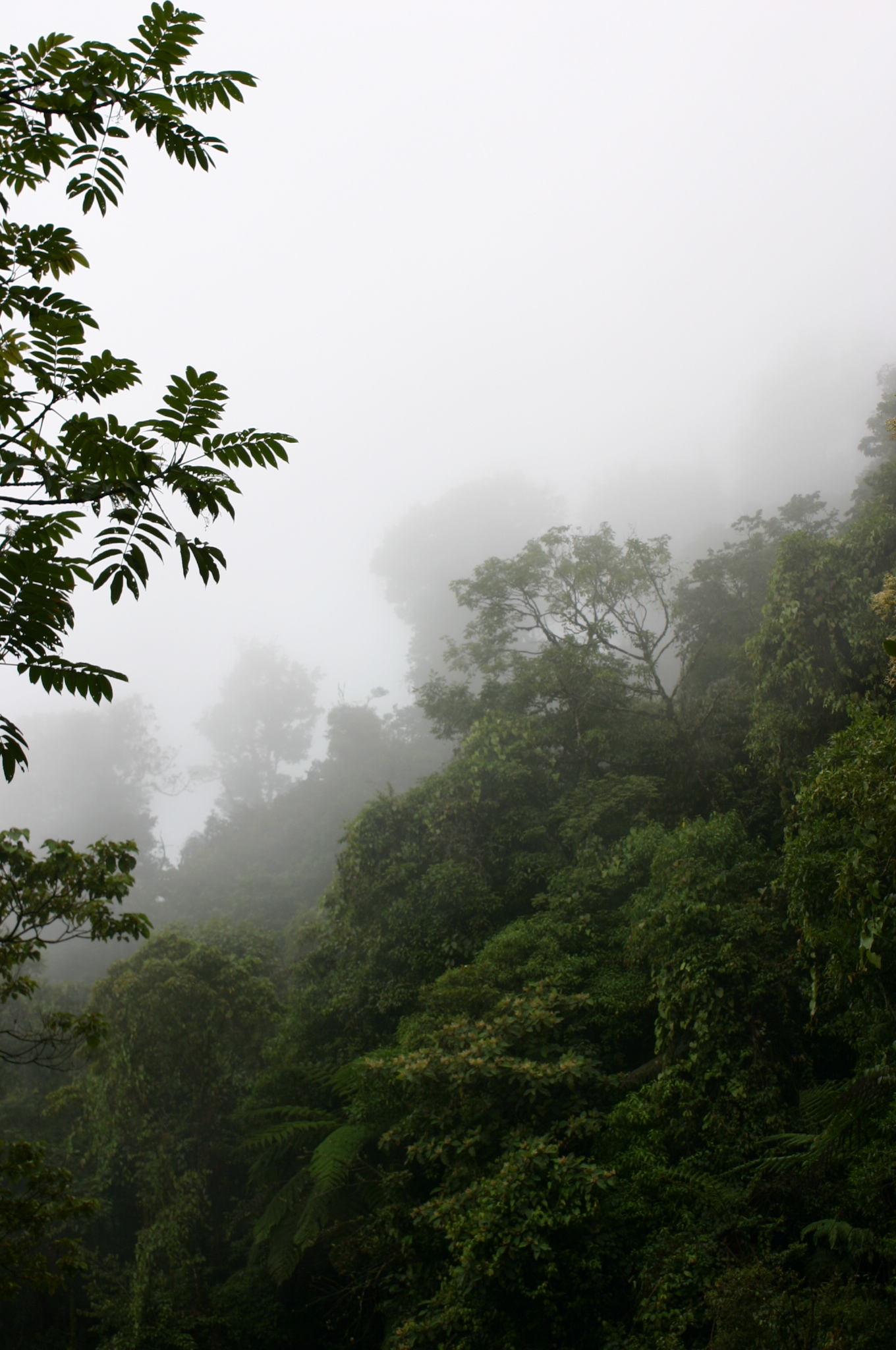
The Cloud Forest of Santiago Comaltepec is some of the best conserved in the world

== Municipalities ==
Municipalities of Ixtlán District

The district includes the following municipalities:

Municipality code	Name	Population		Land Area			Population density	
Municipality code	Name	2020	Rank	km^{2}	sq mi	Rank	2020	Rank
001	Abejones	841	17	126.4	48.8	9	7/km^{2} (17/sq mi)	24
247	Capulálpam de Méndez	1,619	7	37.15	14.34	18	44/km^{2} (113/sq mi)	4
035	Guelatao de Juárez	657	18	4.507	1.740	25	146/km^{2} (378/sq mi)	2
042	Ixtlán de Juárez	8,385	1	562.3	217.1	1	15/km^{2} (39/sq mi)	13
062	Natividad	498	22	2.212	0.854	26	225/km^{2} (583/sq mi)	1
504	Nuevo Zoquiapam	1,590	8	15.80	6.10	23	101/km^{2} (261/sq mi)	3
173	San Juan Atepec	1,457	9	134.2	51.8	7	11/km^{2} (28/sq mi)	19
191	San Juan Chicomezúchil	296	25	20.38	7.87	21	15/km^{2} (38/sq mi)	14
196	San Juan Evangelista Analco	407	24	16.59	6.41	22	25/km^{2} (25/km^{2})	8
214	San Juan Quiotepec	2,033	4	202.9	78.3	4	10/km^{2} (26/sq mi)	22
260	San Miguel Aloápam	2,191	3	142.1	54.9	6	15/km^{2} (40/sq mi)	11
262	San Miguel Amatlán	991	14	60.85	23.49	14	16/km^{2} (42/sq mi)	10
267	San Miguel del Río	245	26	10.64	4.11	24	23/km^{2} (60/sq mi)	9
288	San Miguel Yotao	585	21	39.20	15.14	17	15/km^{2} (39/sq mi)	12
296	San Pablo Macuiltianguis	955	15	28.14	10.86	19	34/km^{2} (88/sq mi)	5
335	San Pedro Yaneri	867	16	28.14	10.86	20	31/km^{2} (80/sq mi)	6
336	San Pedro Yólox	1,697	6	165.4	63.9	5	10/km^{2} (27/sq mi)	21
359	Santa Ana Yareni	637	19	46.37	17.90	16	14/km^{2} (36/sq mi)	15
363	Santa Catarina Ixtepeji	2,675	2	220.1	85.0	2	12/km^{2} (31/sq mi)	16
365	Santa Catarina Lachatao	1,059	12	101.1	39.0	11	10/km^{2} (27/sq mi)	20
419	Santa María Jaltianguis	592	20	53.90	20.81	15	11/km^{2} (28/sq mi)	18
443	Santa María Yavesía	434	23	87.60	33.82	12	5/km^{2} (13/sq mi)	26
458	Santiago Comaltepec	1,157	11	204.1	78.8	3	6/km^{2} (15/sq mi)	25
473	Santiago Laxopa	1,291	10	117.3	45.3	10	11/km^{2} (29/sq mi)	17
496	Santiago Xiacuí	1,893	5	63.31	24.44	13	30/km^{2} (77/sq mi)	7
544	Teococuilco de Marcos Pérez	1,032	13	133.1	51.4	8	8/km^{2} (20/sq mi)	23
	Distrito Ixtlán	36,084	—	2,585	998.07	—	14/km^{2} (36/sq mi)	—
Source: INEGI

=== Largest cities ===
Largest cities or towns in Ixtlán Distric Source:
Rank		Municipality	Pop.
1	Ixtlán de Juárez	Ixtlán de Juárez	3,350
2	San Miguel Aloápam	San Miguel Aloápam	1,605
3	Capulálpam de Méndez	Capulálpam de Méndez	1,568
4	San Juan Atepec	San Juan Atepec	1,401
5	Nuevo Zoquiapam	Nuevo Zoquiapam	1,240
6	San Juan Quiotepec	San Juan Quiotepec	1,224
7	Teococuilco de Marcos Pérez	Teococuilco de Marcos Pérez	890
8	Abejones	Abejones	841
9	Santiago Comaltepec	Santiago Comaltepec	763
10	San Pedro Yólox	San Pedro Yólox	759

== See also ==
- Municipalities of Oaxaca
- Ixtlán Zapotec
