= Universidad de la Sierra Juárez =

Coordinates: 17°19′28.29″N 96°29′9.24″W

- Motto: Inter Natura Et Scientia Harmonia ("Harmony Between Nature and Science")
- Type: Public university
- Established: April 23, 2005
- President: Modesto Seara Vázquez
- Location: Ixtlán de Juárez, Mexico
- Campus: Rural
- Colors: Red & Blue
- Website: www.unsij.edu.mx

The Universidad de la Sierra Juárez (UNSIJ) is a university located in the town of Ixtlán de Juárez in the Mexican state of Oaxaca. It is part of the State University System of Oaxaca (SUNEO) and is public institution of higher education and scientific research. The university is funded by the Oaxaca State Government and the Mexican Federal Government.

== History ==
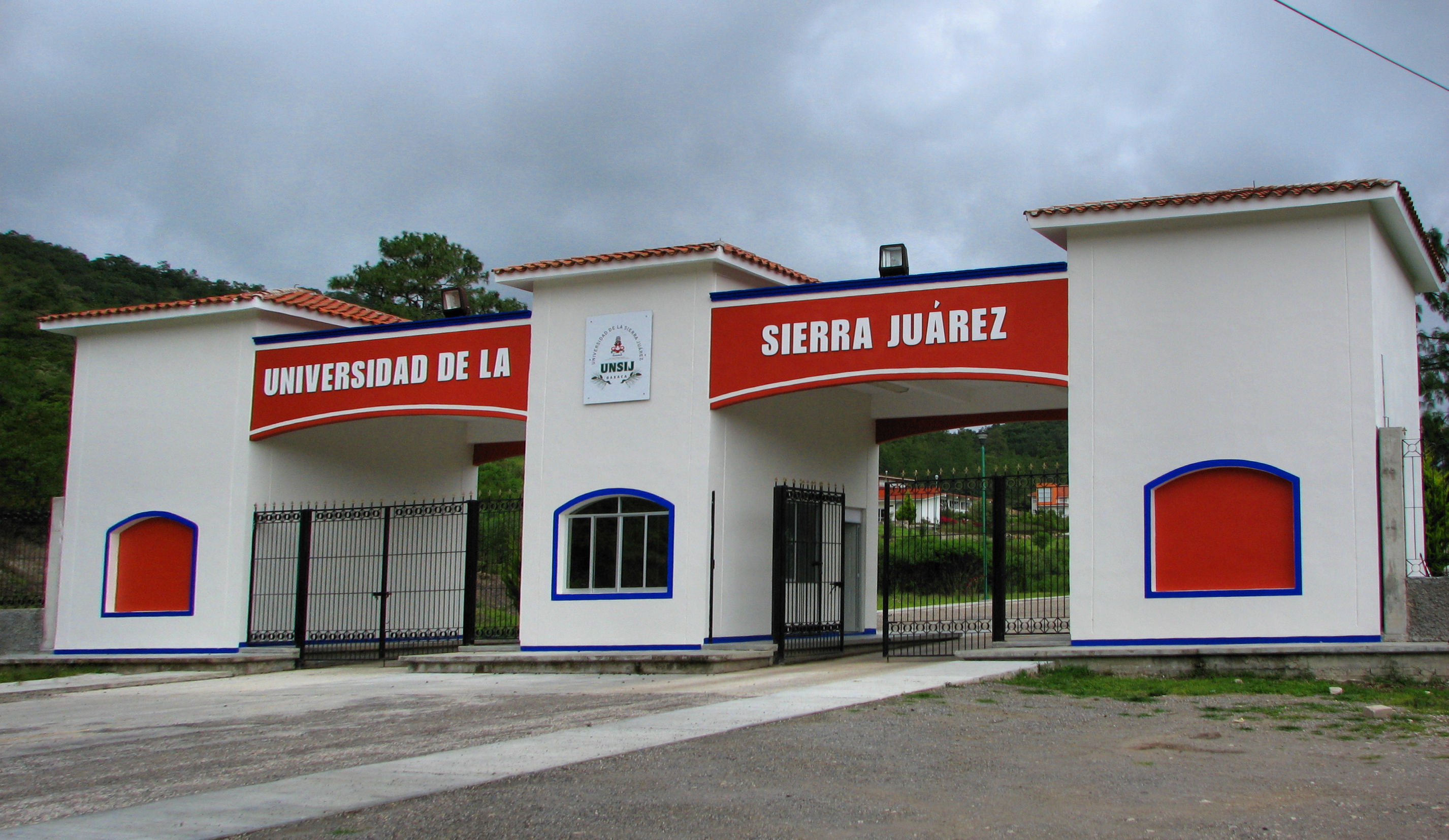
Entrance gate to the Universidad de la Sierra Juárez in Ixtlán de Juárez, Oaxaca, Mexico

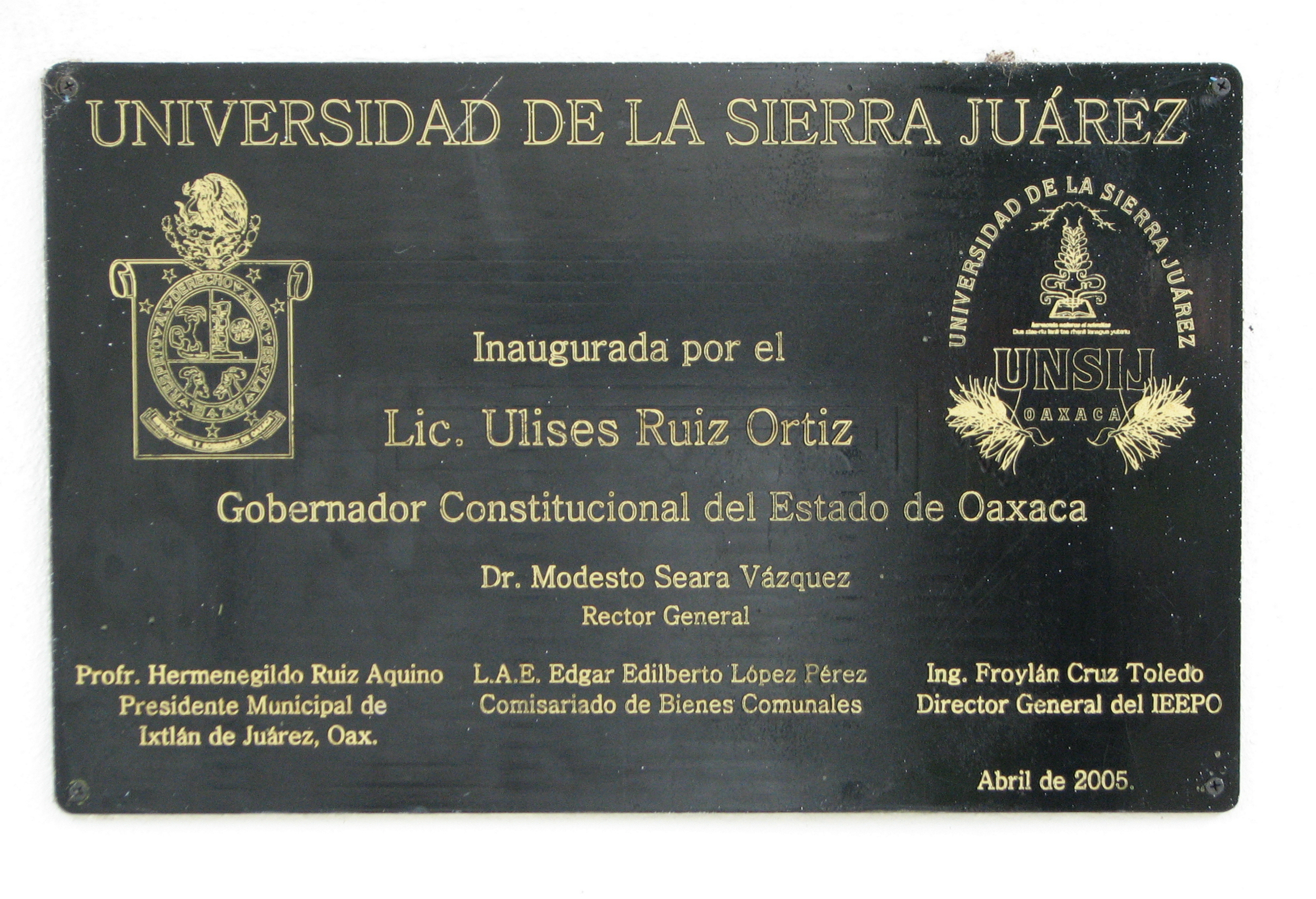
Plaque commemorating the establishment of the university.

=== Ixtlán de Juárez ===
The town of Ixtlán de Juárez existed before the Spanish Conquest of Mexico. It is thought to have been founded in the latter half of the 15th century, by Zapotec people from the region around Tarabundi and San Pedro Laduu (though there are also neolithic remains in the area). The first settlers were probably warriors establishing a defensive outpost against Aztec invaders. In 1859 Ixtlán was the site of a battle during the Reform War between liberal and conservative forces. Some of the other communities in the municipality are probably several centuries older than the town of Ixtlán

=== University establishment ===
As a rural mountainous region, higher education had previously not been available. In April 2005 the government of the state of Oaxaca established the Universidad de la Sierra Juarez to help further the development and education of citizens in the Sierra Norte region. Currently the university offers degrees in the fields of forestry, computer science, environmental science, biology and natural resource technology. UNSIJ also encourages four core academic activities among its students, including: teaching, research, cultural enrichment, and promotion of regional development.

== See also ==
- Universidad Autónoma Benito Juárez de Oaxaca
