= Santa Catarina Ixtepeji =

- Municipality and town
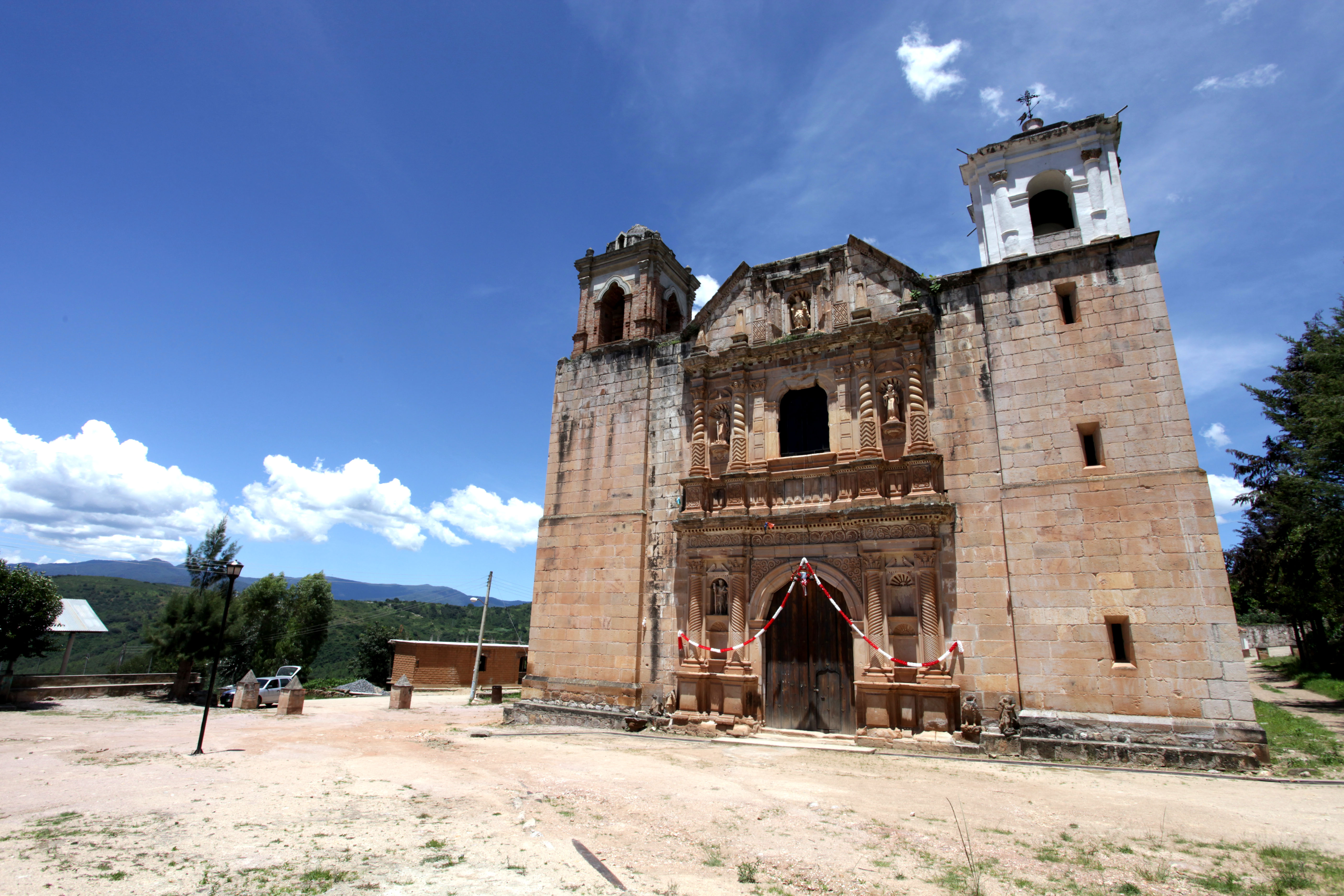
- Temple of Santa Catarina Ixtepeji.

- Location in Mexico
- Coordinates: 17°16′N 96°34′W
- Country: Mexico
- State: Oaxaca
- Time zone: UTC-6 (Central Standard Time)

Santa Catarina Ixtepeji is a town and municipality in Oaxaca in south-western Mexico. It is part of the Ixtlán District in the Sierra Norte region.

== The Codex of Santa Catarina Ixtepeji ==
The Codex of Santa Catarina Ixtepeji (in Spanish, Códice de Santa Catarina Ixtepeji), a late 17th-early 18th century bilingual codex in the Spanish and Zapotec languages, is a seven-foot-long scroll constituting a hand-painted history and map recounting part of the history of Santa Catarina Ixtepeji. It was re-discovered and identified as part of the holdings of the American Geographical Society Library at the University of Wisconsin–Milwaukee in early 2012. It is believed that it was created as part of a presentation to officials of the Spanish Empire in an effort to establish land titles in the village.
