= San Pablo Macuiltianguis =

- Municipality and town
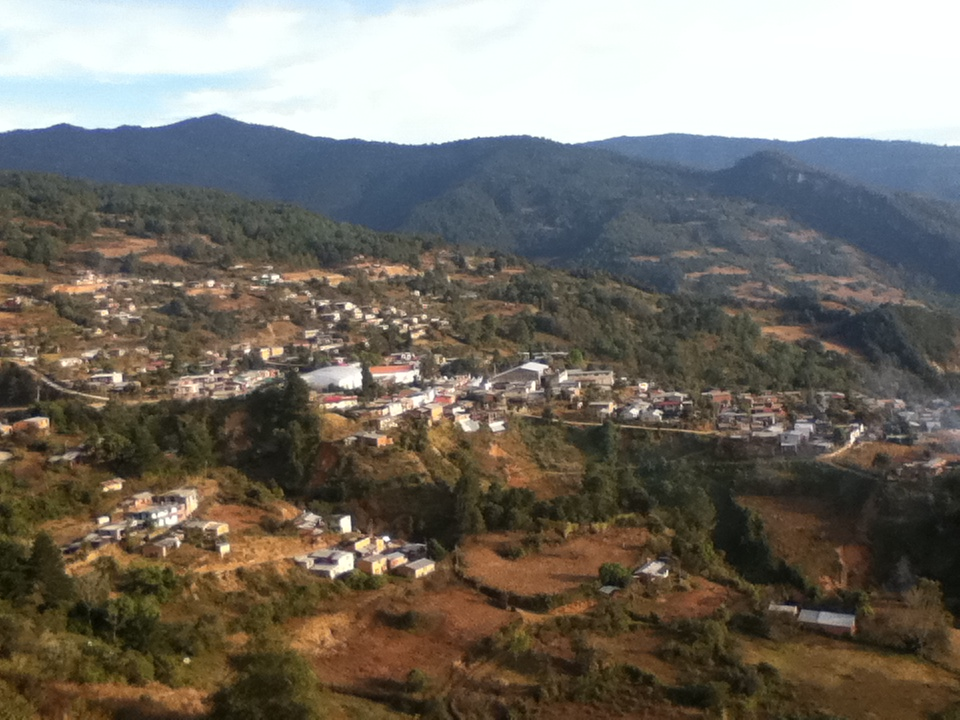

- Location in Mexico
- Coordinates: 17°32′2″N 96°33′12″W
- Country: Mexico
- State: Oaxaca
- Elevation: 2,122 m (6,962 ft)

Population (2010)
  - Total: 371
- Time zone: UTC-6 (Central Standard Time)
- Postal code: 68720
- Area code: 951

San Pablo Macuiltianguis is a town and municipality in Oaxaca in south-western Mexico. It is part of the Ixtlán District in the Sierra Norte region.

As of 2010, the municipality had a total population of 371.

Macuiltianguis Zapotec, a variety of Sierra Juárez Zapotec, is spoken in the town.

== Sources ==
- Foreman, John. 2006. The Morphosyntax of Subjects in Macuiltianguis Zapotec. Ph.D. Dissertation, UCLA.
