= San Miguel Yotao =

- Municipality and town
- Location in Mexico
- Coordinates: 17°23′N 96°20′W
- Country: Mexico
- State: Oaxaca

Area
  - Total: 58.69 km^{2} (22.66 sq mi)

Population (2005)
  - Total: 632
- Time zone: UTC-6 (Central Standard Time)

San Miguel Yotao is a town and municipality in Oaxaca in south-western Mexico. The municipality covers an area of 58.69 km^{2}. It is part of the Ixtlán District in the Sierra Norte region.

As of 2005, the municipality had a total population of 632.
