= San Pablo Guelatao =

- Municipality and town
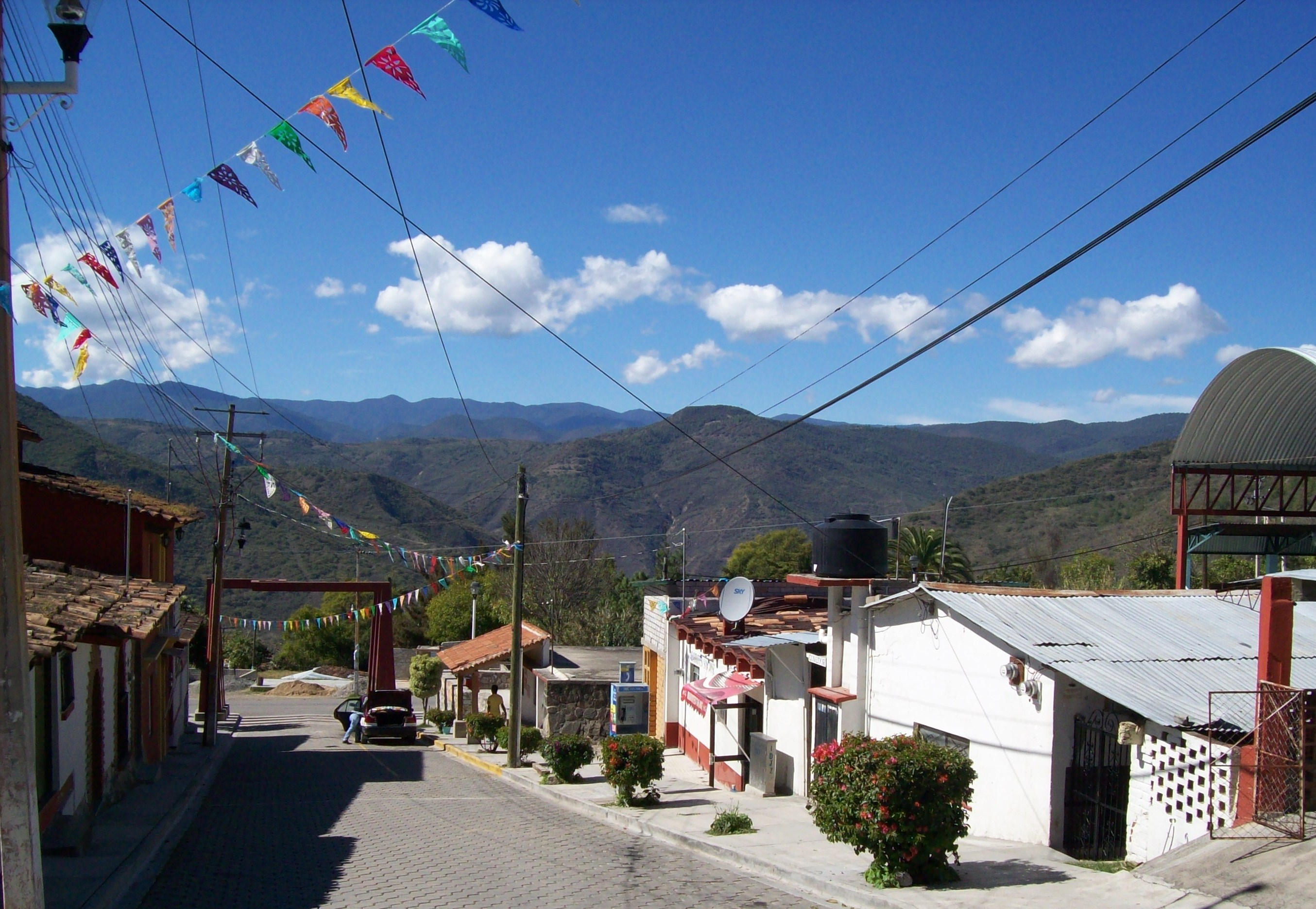

- Location of the municipality in Oaxaca

- Location in Mexico
- Coordinates: 17°19′05″N 96°29′35″W
- Country: Mexico
- State: Oaxaca

Area
  - Total: 22.96 km^{2} (8.86 sq mi)

Population (2005)
  - Total: 476
- Time zone: UTC-6 (Central Standard Time)

San Pablo Guelatao is a town and the seat of the Municipality of Guelatao de Juárez, in the Mexican state of Oaxaca. It is part of the Ixtlán District in the Sierra Norte de Oaxaca region.

Guelatao, as it is often called, is in the foothills of the Sierra de Juárez, a mountain range in the Sierra Madre de Oaxaca System. It is about 55 km north of the city of Oaxaca.

== The town ==
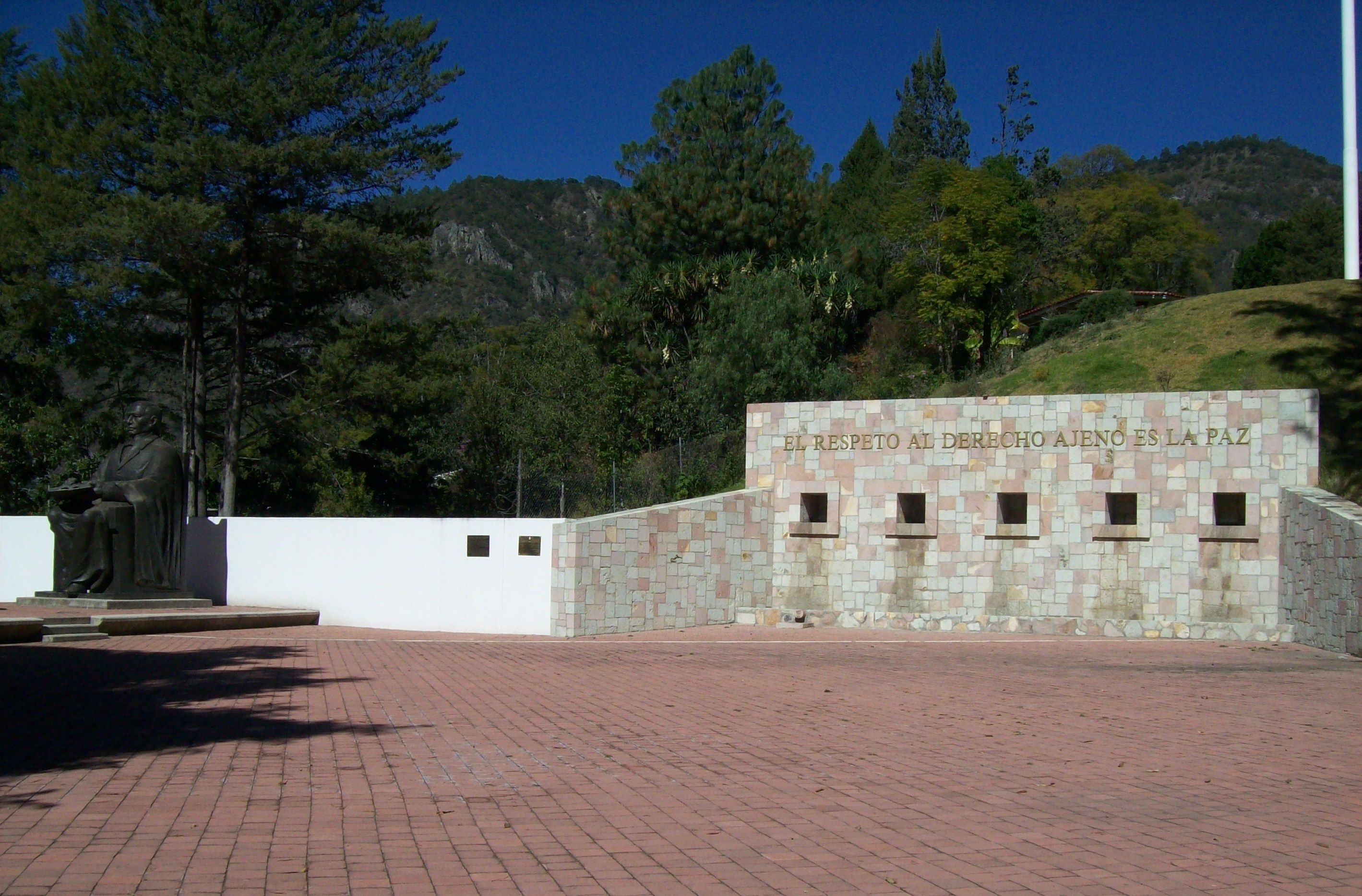
Monument to Benito Juárez

Guelatao is the birthplace of President Benito Juárez, whose parents were Zapotec peasants. He was the first indigenous president of Mexico. When he was born, Guelatao had a population of fewer than 100 people, and fell under the jurisdiction of the larger neighbouring town of Ixtlán. Juárez was baptised in the parish church at Ixtlán, which is now known as Ixtlán de Juárez in his honour. Guelatao became an independent municipality in 1824, after Mexico gained independence from Spain. The town has a small museum dedicated to Juárez.

XEGLO, a government-run indigenous community radio station that broadcasts in Zapotec, Mixe and Chinantec, is based in Guelatao.

=== Demographics ===
In 2005 San Pablo Guelatao had 111 households, with a population of about 476 people. It is largely rural. The majority of the population are indigenous Zapotec.

== The municipality ==
The Municipality of Guelatao de Juárez (named for the president) has governing jurisdiction over the communities of Llano de la Cheta and Río Grande. It is part of the Ixtlán District. San Pablo Guelatao is the seat of the municipality.

== See also ==
- Sierra Madre de Oaxaca topics
