= Capulálpam de Méndez =

- Municipality and town
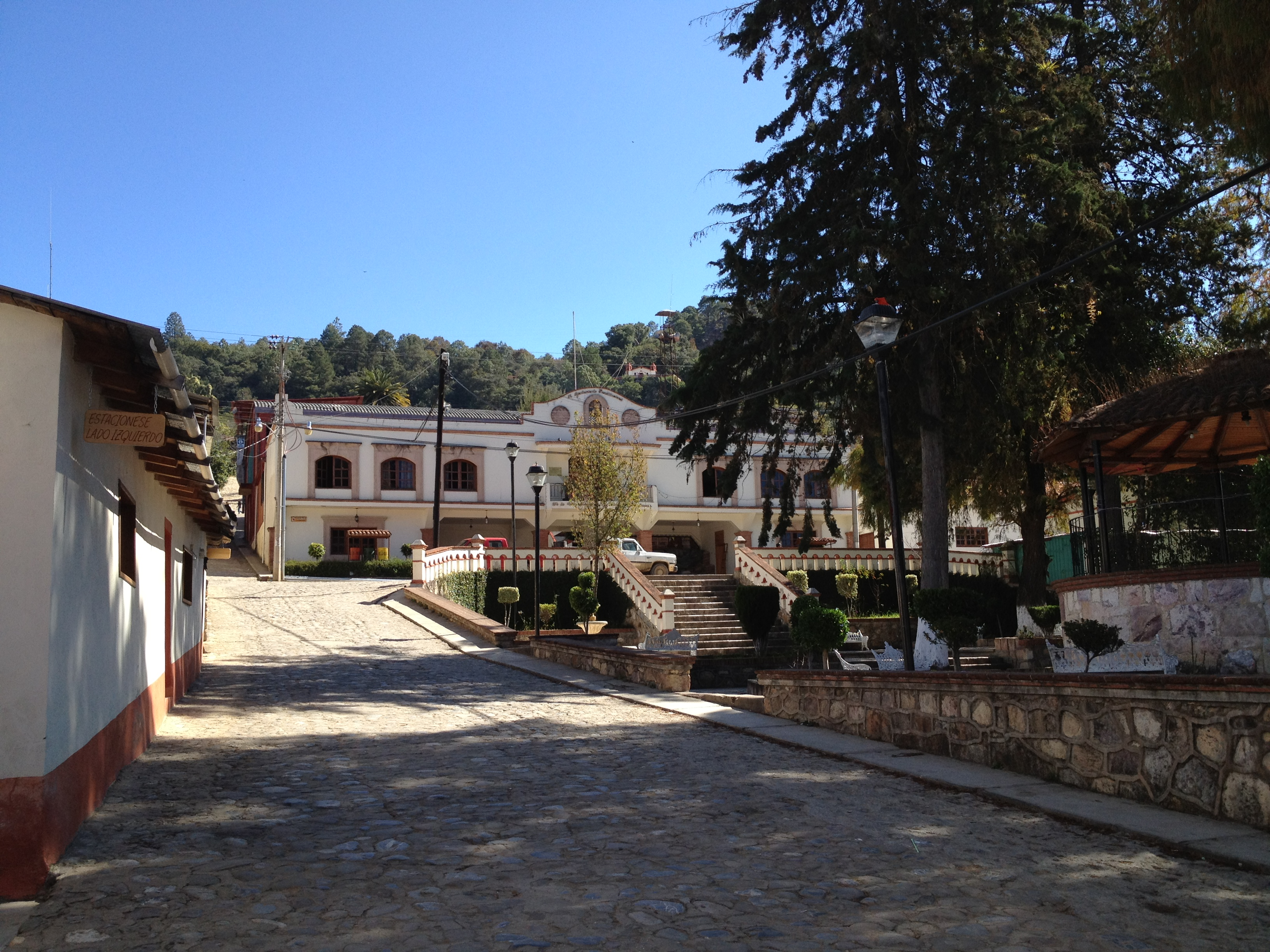

- Location in Mexico
- Coordinates: 17°18′N 96°27′W
- Country: Mexico
- State: Oaxaca

Area
  - Total: 19.14 km^{2} (7.39 sq mi)
- Elevation: 2,040 m (6,690 ft)

Population (2005)
  - Total: 1,313
- Time zone: UTC-6 (Central Standard Time)

Capulálpam de Méndez (Spanish: [kalpuˈlalpan de ˈmendes]) is a town and municipality in the Sierra Juárez in Oaxaca in south-western Mexico. It is part of the Ixtlán District in the Sierra Norte de Oaxaca region. The name "Capulálpam" in Nahuatl means "land of the chokecherry tree," a common type of tree in the area. In 2005 the population was 1,313.

== Geography ==
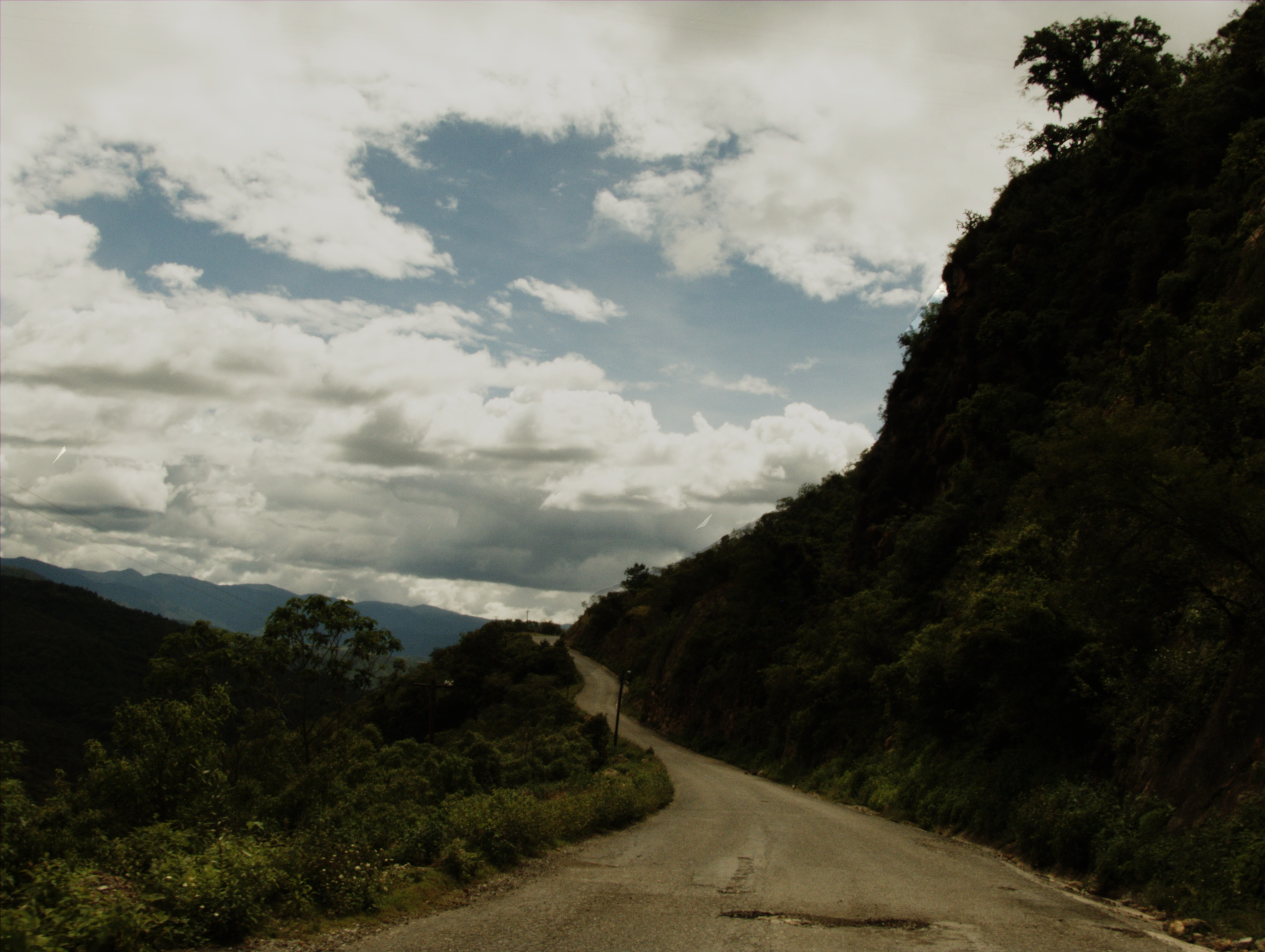
Road in the municipality of Capulálpam de Méndez

The municipality covers an area of 19.14 km^{2} of rugged mountainous terrain. The town is at an altitude of 2,040 meters above sea level in a high mountain valley.The climate is predominantly cool and wet.

=== Flora and fauna ===
Common flowers include gladiolus, geraniums, roses, bougainvillea, tulips, and calla lilies. Trees include ash, aguilar, ayacahuite, oak, and Madrano ocotal, as well as fruit-bearing walnuts, pears, quince, apple, peach, plum and chokecherry.

Common birds are the eagle, hawk, crow, owl, dove, vulture, swallow, sparrow, lark, quail, pheasant, picocanda and magpie. Wild animals include fox, coyote, badger, armadillo, wild boar, deer, cacomistle, opossum, cougar, skunk, bat, jaguar, panther, rabbit and paca. The area also has lizards, coral snakes, rattlesnakes, tarantula and scorpion.

== Economy ==
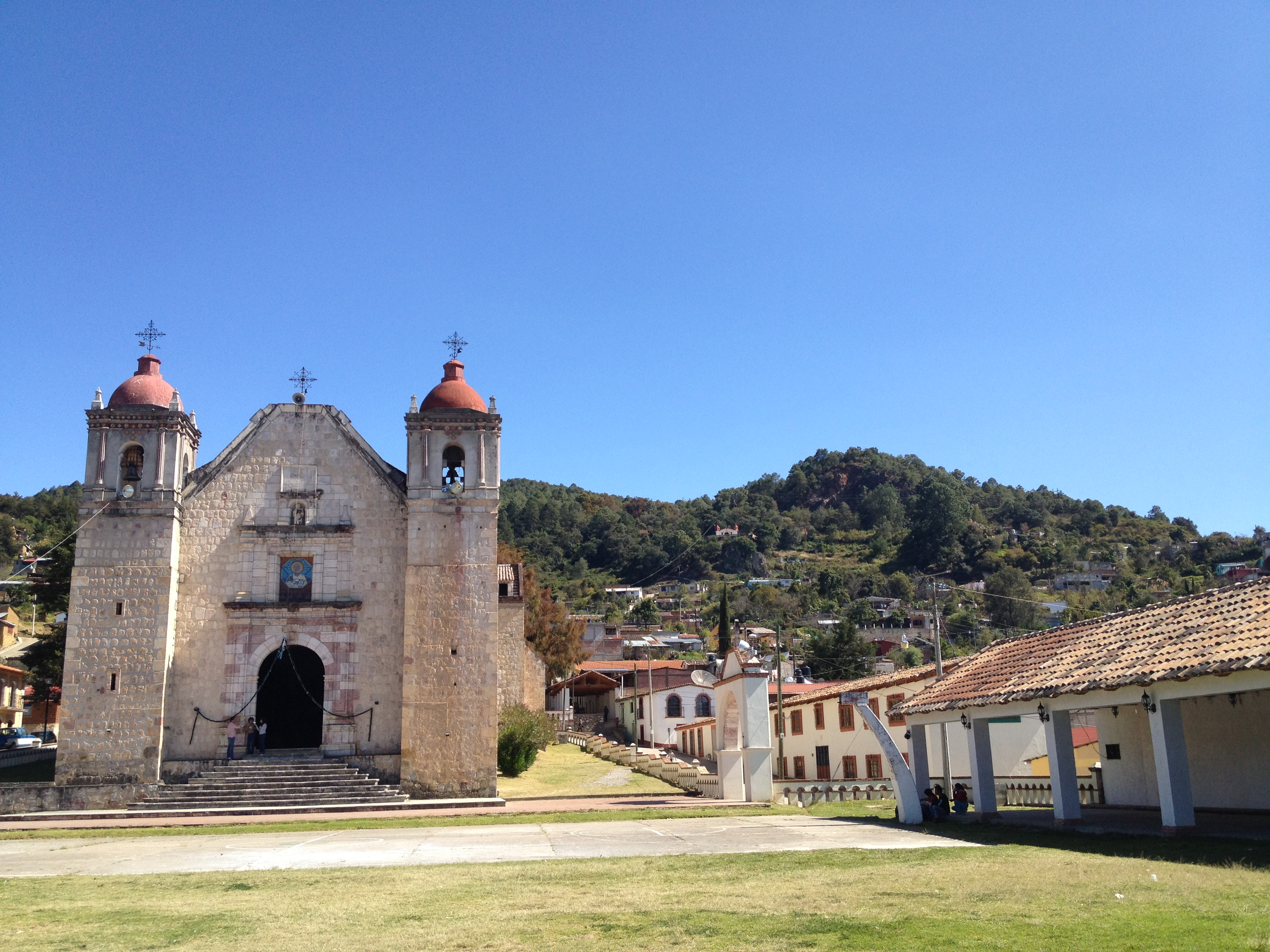
Entrance to church in Capulálpam de Méndez

As of 2005, the municipality had 326 households with a total population of 1,313. Some 89 spoke an indigenous language.

About 10% of the population is engaged in jewelry manufacture and another 10% work in a stone aggregate plant. Most others are engaged in agriculture.

The town has a beautiful 16th-century church dedicated to St. Matthew. The church interior is lined by 15 large, ornate, hand-carved religious scenarios that date from the 16th and 17th centuries.

In February 2008 Capulálpam was officially designated a "Pueblo Magico" (magical town), Oaxaca's first and Mexico's 33rd such town. The government also announced plans to construct a traditional healing center. The new designation and the healing center were expected to boost tourism. Opened by 2010, the center employs traditional healers, who provide medicinal plant therapy, massages, temazcal and herbal baths. It has an herbal pharmacy and offers basic training courses about a great variety of medicinal plants. The 'temazcal' is a type of sweat lodge that uses the four elements of fire, air, water and earth for spiritual and physical healing. Participants may reach a level of consciousness similar to that of meditation.
