= San Juan Chicomezúchil =

- Municipality and town
- Location in Mexico
- Coordinates: 17°17′N 96°30′W
- Country: Mexico
- State: Oaxaca

Area
  - Total: 76.55 km^{2} (29.56 sq mi)

Population (2005)
  - Total: 281
- Time zone: UTC-6 (Central Standard Time)

San Juan Chicomezúchil is a town and municipality in Oaxaca in south-western Mexico. The municipality covers an area of 76.55 km^{2}. It is part of the Ixtlán District in the Sierra Norte region.

As of 2005, the municipality had a total population of 281.
