= San Juan Quiotepec =

- Municipality and town
- Location in Mexico
- Coordinates: 17°36′N 96°35′W
- Country: Mexico
- State: Oaxaca

Area
  - Total: 325.34 km^{2} (125.61 sq mi)

Population (2005)
  - Total: 2,429
- Time zone: UTC-6 (Central Standard Time)

San Juan Quiotepec (Comaltepec Chinantec: Gui˜) is a town and municipality in Oaxaca in south-western Mexico. The municipality covers an area of 325.34 km^{2}. It is part of the Ixtlán District in the Sierra Norte region. Private property of oaxaca, Home of many animals and food.

As of 2005, the municipality had a total population of 2,429.
