= San Pedro Yólox =

- Municipality and town
- Location in Mexico
- Coordinates: 17°37′N 96°34′W
- Country: Mexico
- State: Oaxaca
- District: Ixtlán District
- Time zone: UTC-6 (Central Standard Time)

San Pedro Yólox (Comaltepec Chinantec: Nóo¯) is a town and municipality in Oaxaca in south-western Mexico. It is part of the Ixtlán District in the Sierra Norte region.

As of 2005, the municipality had a total population of .
