= San Juan Atepec =

- Municipality and town
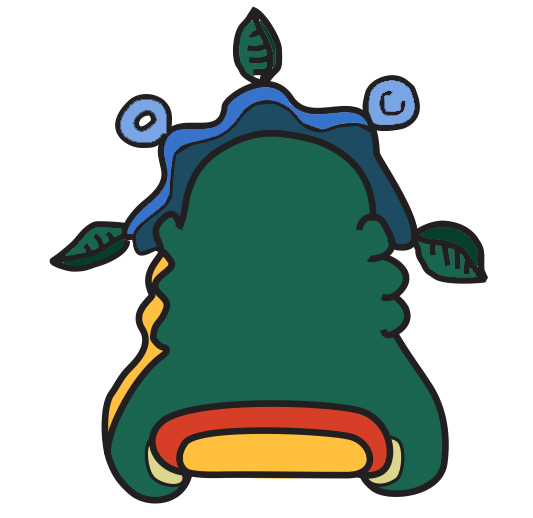
- Coat of arms

- Location in Mexico
- Coordinates: 17°26′N 96°32′W
- Country: Mexico

Area
  - Total: 88.03 km^{2} (33.99 sq mi)

Population (2005)
  - Total: 1,301
- Time zone: UTC-6 (Central Standard Time)

San Juan Atepec is a town and municipality in Oaxaca in south-western Mexico. The municipality covers an area of 88.03 km^{2}. It is part of the Ixtlán District in the Sierra Norte region. As of 2005, the municipality had a total population of 1,301.

== History ==
In prehispanic times, Atepec was subject to Teococuilco and its patron deity was Quezelao, the "provider of seasonal fields".
