= San Pedro Yaneri =

- Municipality and town
- Location in Mexico
- Coordinates: 17°26′N 96°21′W
- Country: Mexico
- State: Oaxaca

Area
  - Total: 79.1 km^{2} (30.5 sq mi)
- Elevation: 1,300 m (4,300 ft)

Population (2005)
  - Total: 943
- Time zone: UTC-6 (Central Standard Time)

San Pedro Yaneri is a town and municipality in Oaxaca in south-western Mexico. The municipality covers an area of 79.1 km^{2}.

As of 2005, the municipality had a total population of 943, of whom 807 spoke some indigenous language.

The municipality is one of nine that make up the "Rincon de Ixtlán", the only one that is not also within the municipality of Ixtlán de Juárez. It is part of the Ixtlán District in the Sierra Norte region.
