= San Miguel Aloápam =

- Municipality and town
- Location in Mexico
- Coordinates: 17°25′N 96°41′W
- Country: Mexico
- State: Oaxaca

Area
  - Total: 133.96 km^{2} (51.72 sq mi)

Population (2005)
  - Total: 2,637
- Time zone: UTC-6 (Central Standard Time)

San Miguel Aloápam is a town and municipality in Oaxaca in south-western Mexico. The municipality covers an area of 133.96 km^{2}. It is part of the Ixtlán District in the Sierra Norte region.

As of 2005, the municipality had a total population of 2,637.
