= Santa María Yavesía =

Santa María Yavesia
- Municipality and town
- Location in Mexico
- Coordinates: 17°14′N 96°24′W
- Country: Mexico
- State: Oaxaca
- Time zone: UTC-6 (Central Standard Time)

Santa María Yavesia is a town and municipality in Oaxaca in south-western Mexico. It is part of the Ixtlán District in the Sierra Norte region.
