= Ixtlán de Juárez =

Ixtlán de Juárez Laa Yetzi (Southeastern Ixtlán Zapotec)
- Town
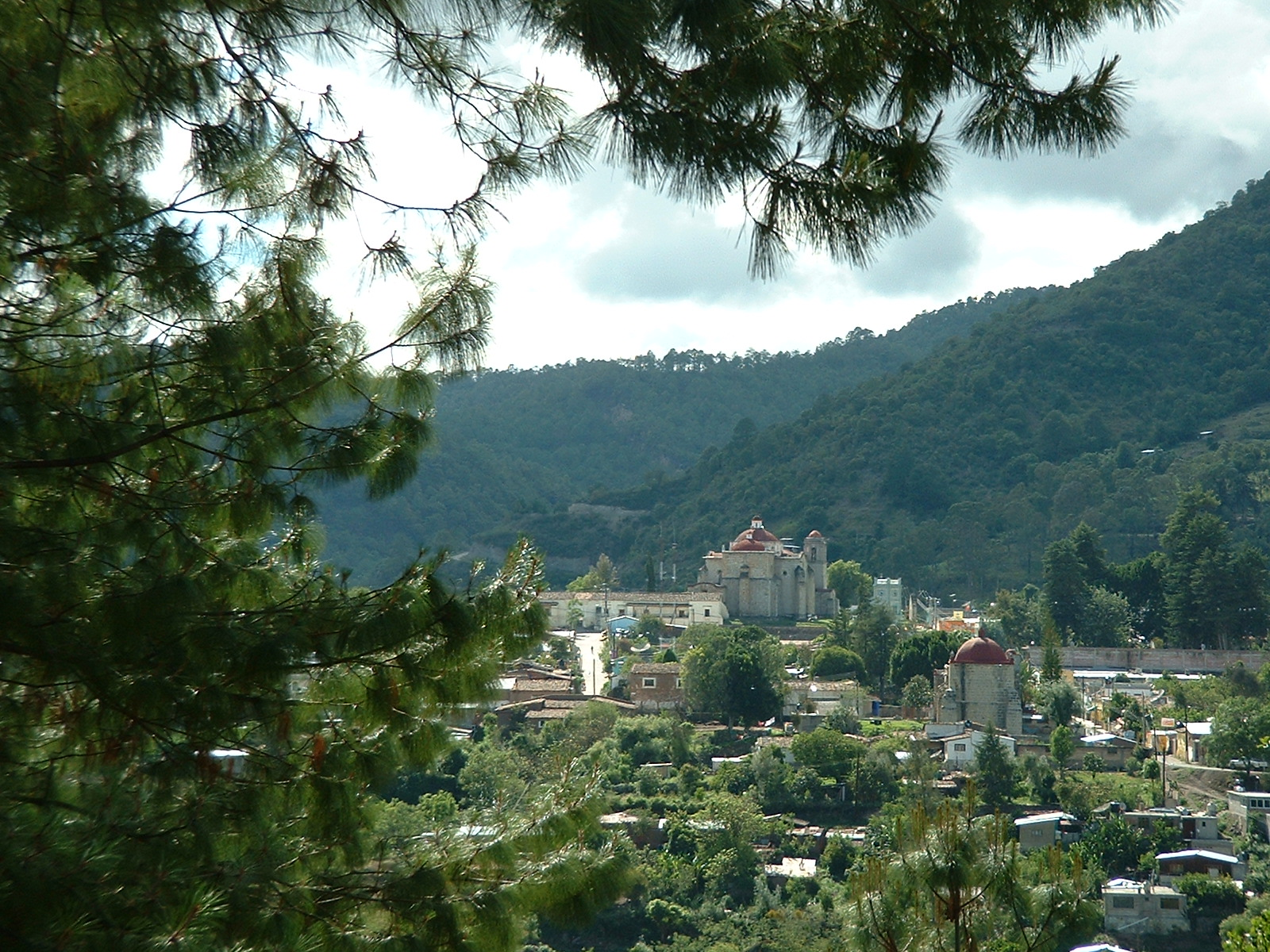

- Location within Mexico
- Coordinates: 17°19′50″N 96°29′14″W
- Country: Mexico
- State: Oaxaca
- Municipality: Ixtlán de Juárez
- Elevation: 2,030 m (6,660 ft)

Population
  - Total: 2,479
- Time zone: UTC-6 (Central Standard Time)
- Postal code: 68725
- Area code: 951

Ixtlán de Juárez (Zapotec: Laa Yetzi) is a town and municipality in the Mexican state of Oaxaca about 65 km north of the city of Oaxaca on Federal Highway 175 towards Veracruz. It is part of the Ixtlán District in the Sierra Norte de Oaxaca region.

== Administrative areas ==
=== Municipality of Ixtlán ===
The municipality of Ixtlán de Juárez includes the town, and in addition the settlements of San Juan Yagila, Santa Cruz Yagavila, Santa María Yahuiche, Santa María Zoogochi, Santiago Teotlasco, Santo Domingo Cacalotepec, San Gaspar Yagalaxi, San Miguel Tiltepec, Santa María Josaa, La Luz, La Josefina and La Palma. The population of the town in the 2005 census was 2,479, and of the entire municipality, 7,188. Other than the town of Ixtlán, none of the settlements have as many as a thousand inhabitants.

=== Rincón de Ixtlán ===
The Rincón de Ixtlán is an area largely within the municipality of Ixtlán de Juárez. It comprises nine communities, eight of them within the municipality of Ixtlán (the ninth, San Pedro Yaneri, is a small independent municipality). The Rincón does not include the town of Ixtlán or other communities on the main road. This remote and culturally homogeneous area is one of the most intensely indigenous in the whole of Mexico, and has therefore been the subject of considerable sociological study.

== History ==
The town of Ixtlán existed before the Spanish Conquest of Mexico. It is thought to have been founded in the latter half of the 15th century, by Zapotec people from the region around Tarabundi and San Pedro Laduu (though there are also neolithic remains in the area). The first settlers were probably warriors establishing a defensive outpost against Aztec invaders. In 1859 Ixtlán was the site of a battle during the Reform War between liberal and conservative forces. Some of the other communities in the municipality are probably several centuries older than the town of Ixtlán.

San Pablo Guelatao, the birthplace of Benito Juárez, lies 4 km from the town of Ixtlán and at the time of his birth fell within its jurisdiction, so Juárez was baptised in the church of St Thomas in Ixtlán; hence his name has been added to that of the town (in 1824, however, Guelatao declared itself independent of Ixtlán, and it remains an independent municipality.) The addition of Juárez's name serves the additional purpose of distinguishing the town from the many other Ixtláns in Mexico: the name is usually claimed to come from Aztec words meaning "land of the maguey", and use of the maguey (otherwise known as the century plant) was widespread in pre-Columbian Mexico. An alternative proposed derivation is from Mixtec words meaning "place of obsidian", and the town uses a logo that depicts an object made of obsidian.

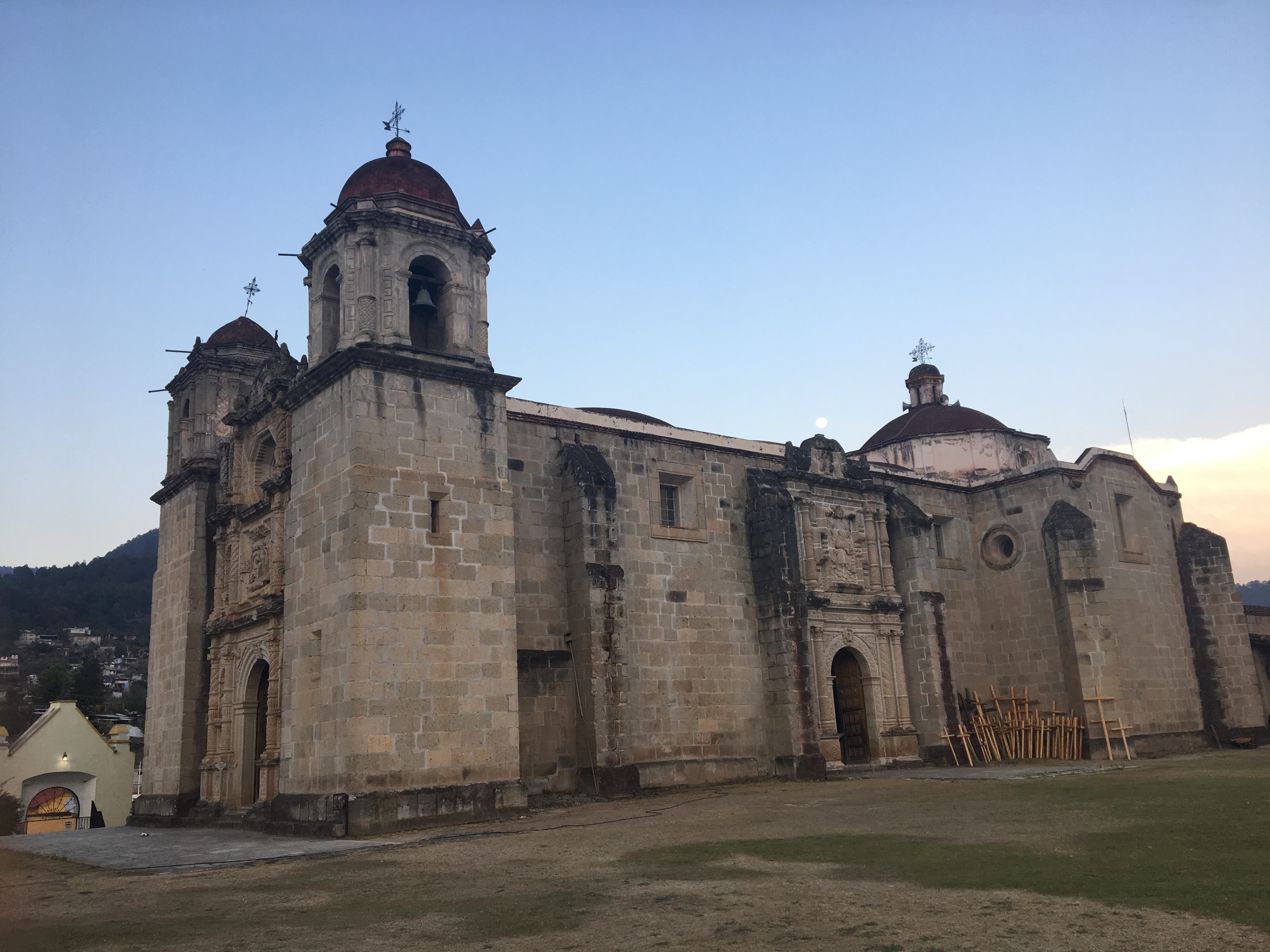
Saint Thomas Ixtlan's Temple

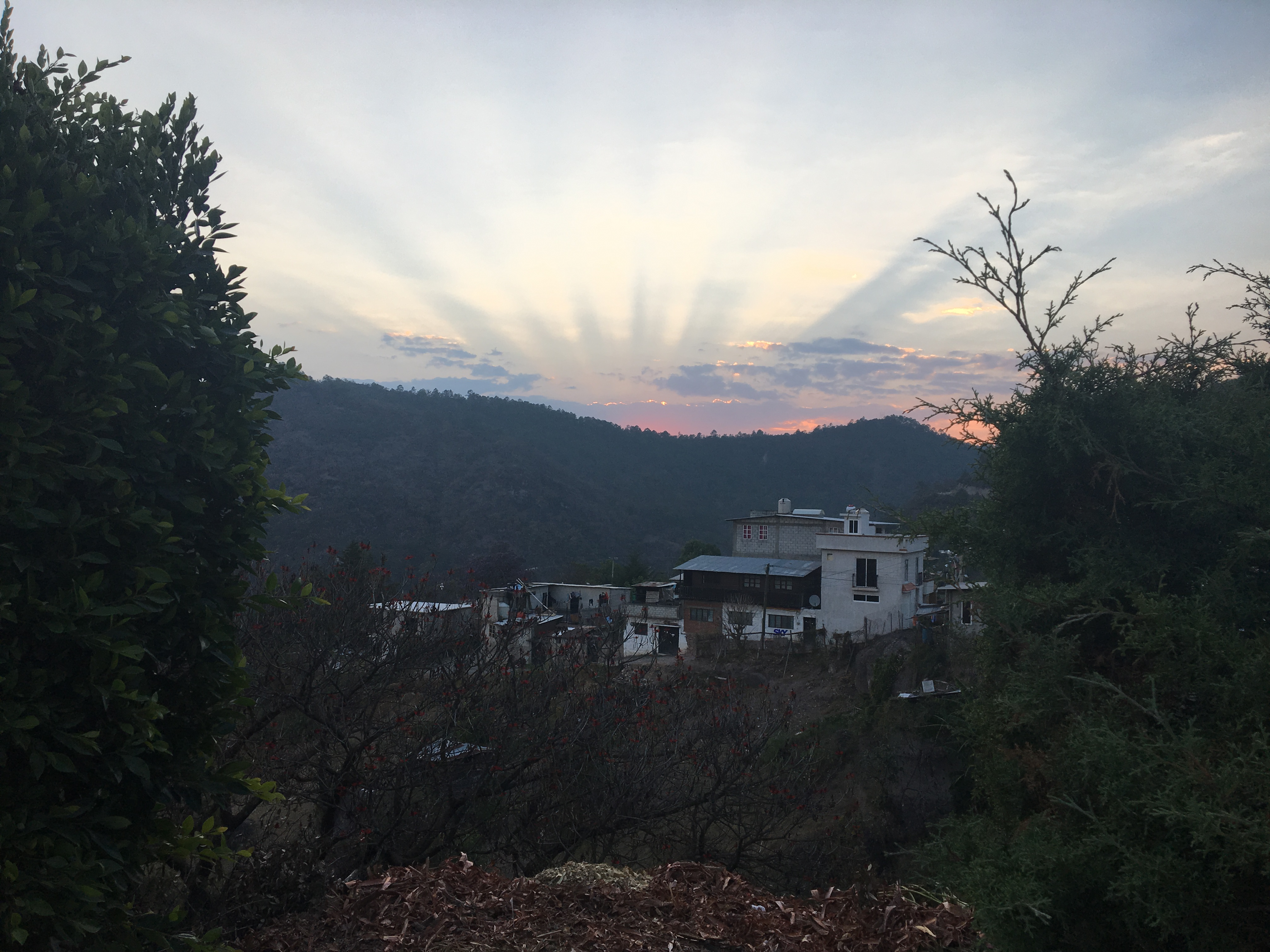
Evening in Ixtlan

== Economy ==
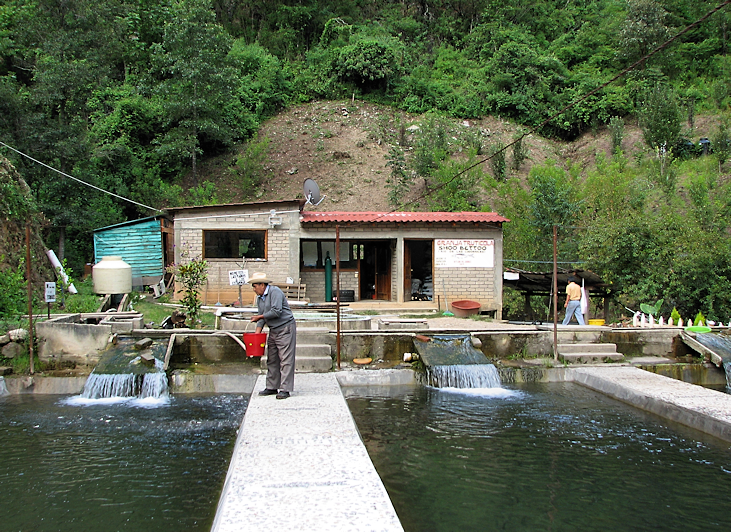
An economically sustainable, community-owned fish farm, located near Ixtlan.

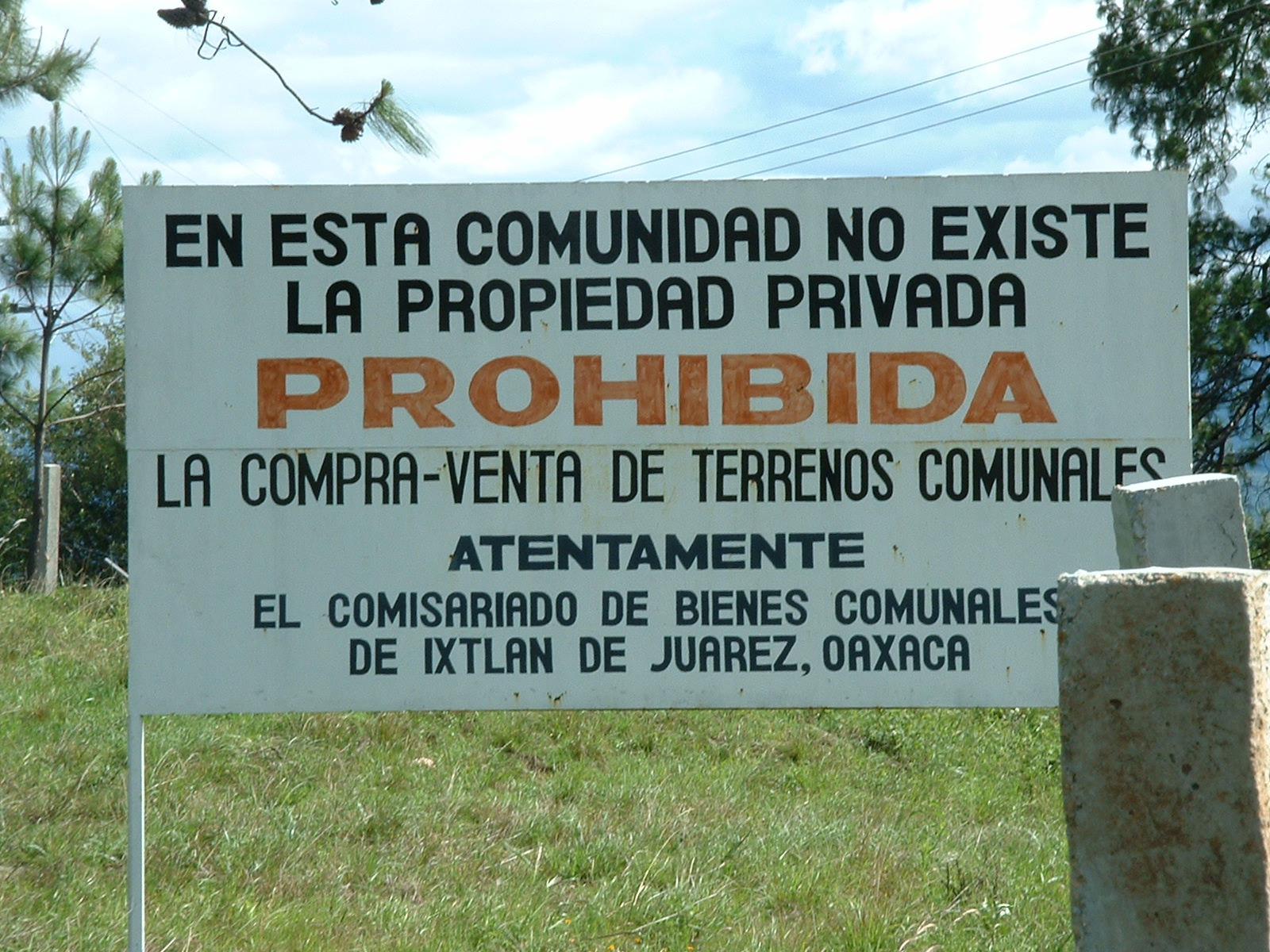
In this community private property does not exist. Purchase and sale of land prohibited.

Ixtlán is now a centre for eco-tourism. Its location, surrounded by cloud forest and pine and oak woodlands (which are forested sustainably) gives it great natural landscape beauty, and the forests of the Sierra Juárez mountains are claimed to be home to around 500 bird species and 6000 plant species. Tours are operated from the village, and accommodation is available. Hiking trails link it to neighbouring towns and villages in the Sierra Norte. It is accessible by the bus service that connects Oaxaca and Veracruz along Federal Highway 175. The land is held in common, but for a time in the late 20th century, a Mexican national paper manufacturer held a concession to harvest its forests. However, when the concession expired, the local communities denied the company any extensions and the forests are now managed communally in order to ensure that they are sustainable. Principal agricultural crops in the municipality of Ixtlán are maize and coffee, with a small amount of land given over to sugarcane and other crops. Fair trade marketing has made a substantial difference to the coffee growers in this area.

== Education ==
=== Higher education ===
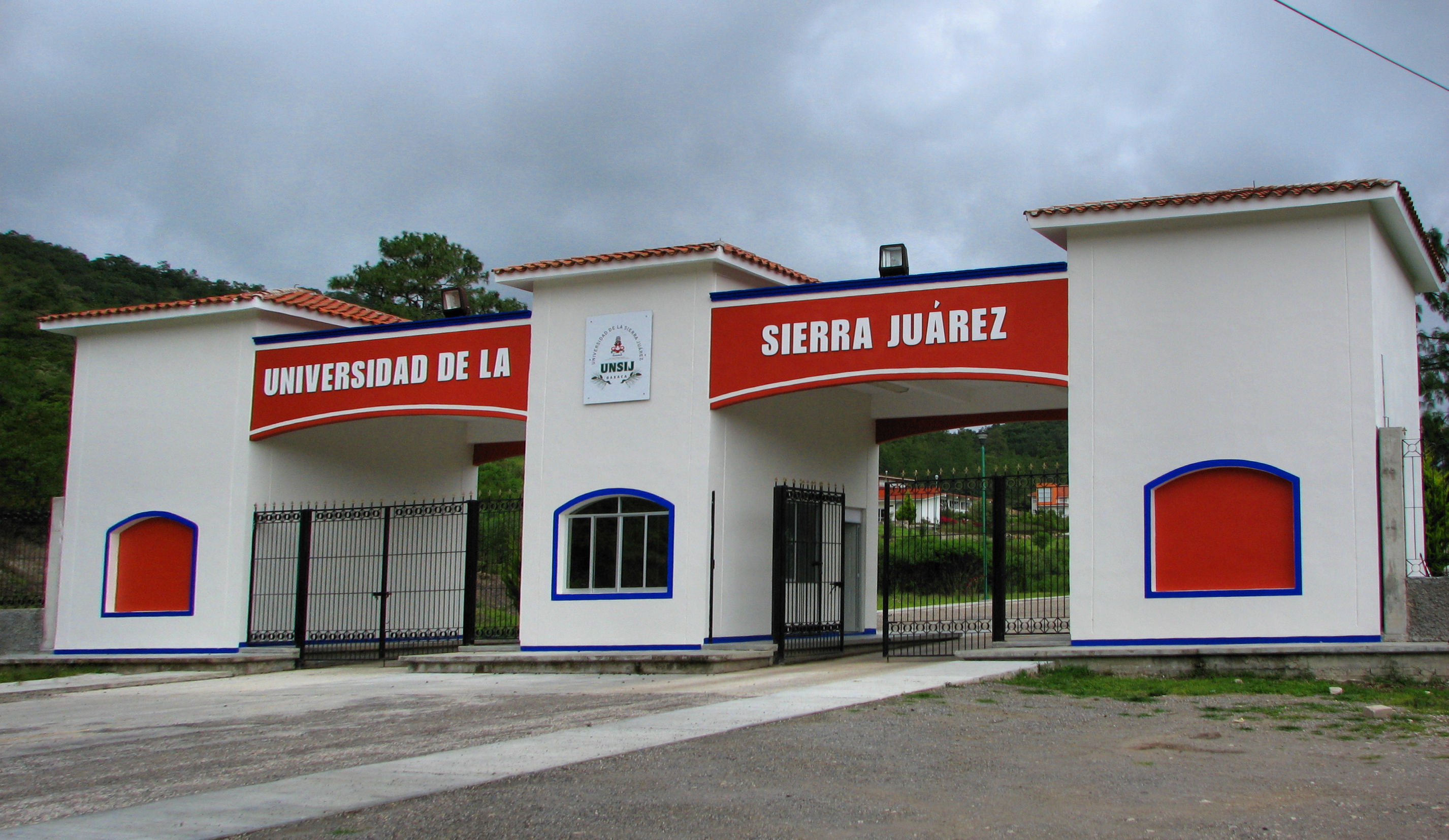
The Universidad de la Sierra Juárez was established in 2005. It is part of the Sistema de Universidades Estatales de Oaxaca.

As a rural mountainous region, higher education had previously not been readily available to the populace. In April 2005 the government of the state of Oaxaca established the Universidad de la Sierra Juárez to help further the development and education of citizens in the Sierra Norte region. Currently the university offers degrees in the fields of natural sciences, sociology and humanities. UNSIJ also encourages four core academic activities among its students, including: teaching, research, cultural enrichment, and promotion of regional development.

== Notable buildings ==
- Templo de St Tomás Apóstol (Church of St Thomas the Apostle), a baroque building constructed 1640–1734, replacing an earlier adobe structure.
- Clock tower on the Plaza
- Presidencia municipal
- Museo de la Biodiversidad (Biodiversity Museum)

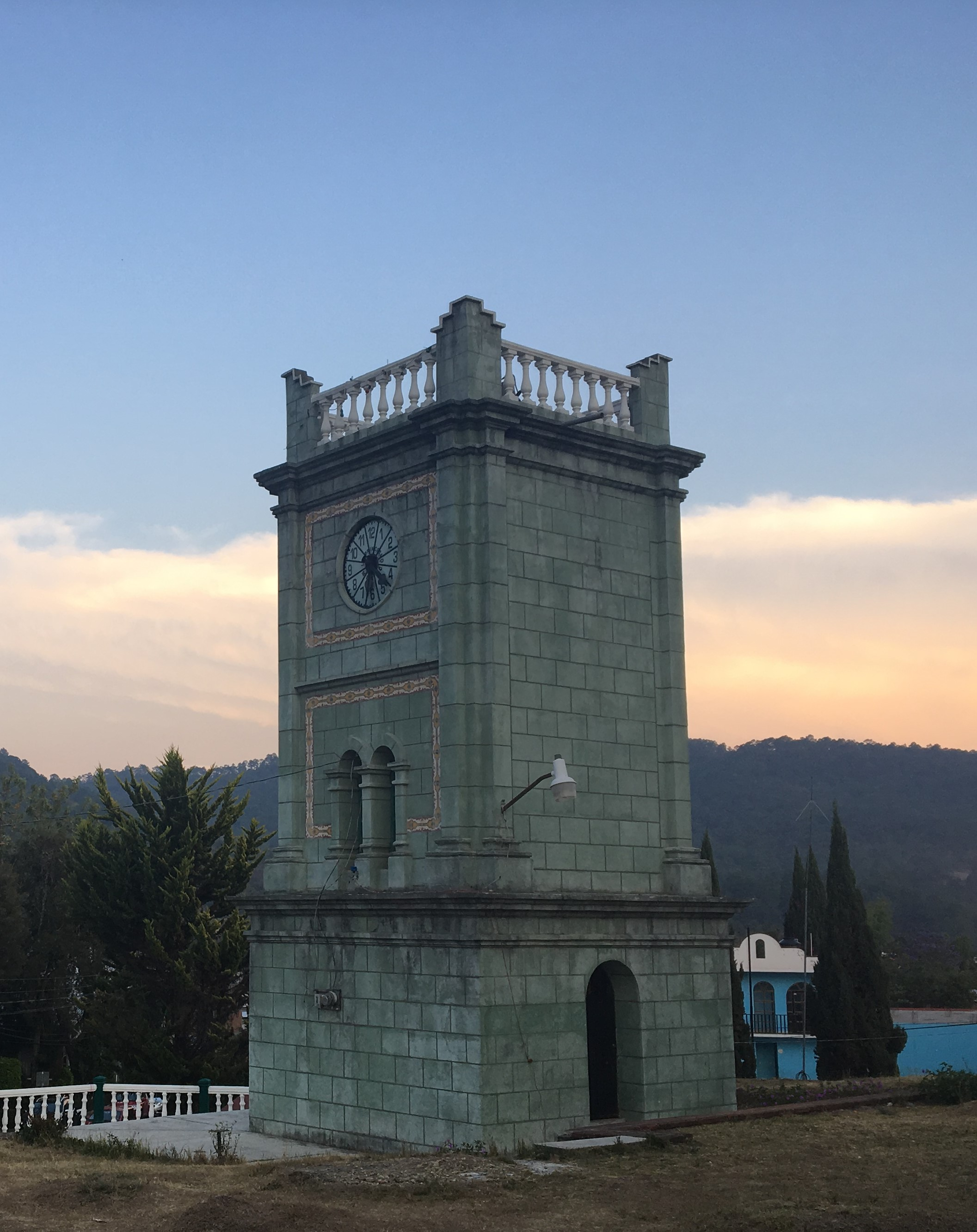
Clock tower in the center of the town
