= Santa Ana Yareni =

- Municipality and town
- Location in Mexico
- Coordinates: 17°23′N 96°37′W
- Country: Mexico
- State: Oaxaca
- Time zone: UTC-6 (Central Standard Time)

Santa Ana Yareni is a town and municipality in Oaxaca in south-western Mexico. The municipality covers an area of 43.38 km^{2}. It is part of the Ixtlán District in the Sierra Norte region.

As of 2005, the municipality had a total population of 940.
