= Santa Catarina Lachatao =

- Municipality and town
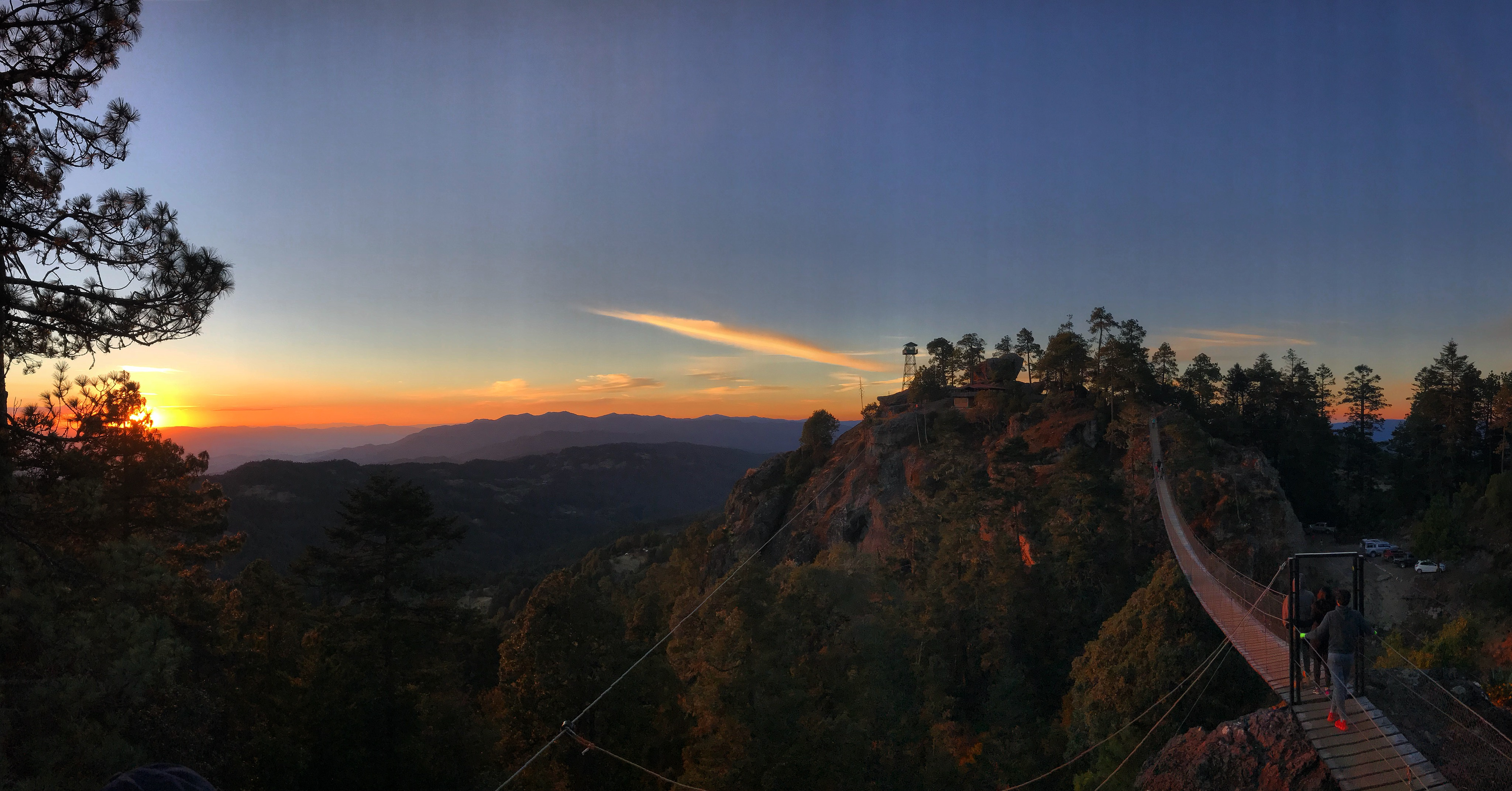

- Location of the municipality in Oaxaca

- Location in Mexico
- Coordinates: 17°15′N 96°28′W
- Country: Mexico
- State: Oaxaca
- Time zone: UTC-6 (Central Standard Time)

Santa Catarina Lachatao is a town and municipality in Oaxaca in south-western Mexico. It is part of the Ixtlán District in the Sierra Norte region.
