= Highland Chinantec language =

Oto-Mangue language spoken in Mexico

Highland Chinantec
- jmíiˊ
- Native to: Mexico
- Region: Oaxaca Highlands
- Ethnicity: Chinantecs
- Native speakers: (10,000 cited 1990–1998)
- Language family: Oto-Mangue: Western Oto-Mangue; Oto-Pame–Chinantecan; Chinantec; Highland Chinantec
- Dialects: Quiotepec Chinantec; Comaltepec Chinantec; Yolox Chinantec

Language codes
- ISO 639-3: Either: chq – Quiotepec Chinantec cco – Comaltepec Chinantec
- Glottolog: chin1488
- ELP: Sierra Chinantec

Highland Chinantec is a Chinantecan language of Mexico, spoken in Comaltepec, San Juan Quiotepec, and surrounding towns in northern Oaxaca. It has a complex system of tone and vowel length compared to other Chinantec languages. The two principal varieties, Quiotepec and Comaltepec, have marginal mutual intelligibility. Yolox Chinantec is somewhat less divergent.

== Phonology ==
=== Comaltepec ===
The following are sounds of Comaltepec Chinantec:

Consonants
		Labial	Alveolar	Retroflex	Palatal	Velar	Laryngeal
Nasal		m	n		(ɲ)	ŋ	
Stop & Affricate	voiceless	p	t		tʃ	k	ʔ
Stop & Affricate	voiced	ᵐb	ⁿd		ⁿdʒ	ᵑɡ	
Fricative	voiceless	(f)	s	(ʂ)	(ʃ)	(x)	h
Fricative	voiced			(ʐ)			
Lateral			l				
Approximant					j	w	

1. Parenthesised sounds are loans, allophones, or free variants
2. Voiced stops are frequently prenasalised

Vowels
	Front	Central	Back
High	i	ɨ	u
Mid	e	ʌ	o
Low	æ		a

Tones

=== Quiotepec ===
The following are sounds of Quiotepec Chinantec:

Consonants
		Labial	Alveolar	Palatal	Velar	Laryngeal
Nasal		m	n	ɲ	ŋ	
Stop	voiceless	p	t	tʲ	k	ʔ
Stop	voiced	b	d	dʲ	ɡ	
Fricative	voiceless	f	s	ç		h
Fricative	voiced	β	ð	ʝ	ɣ	
Lateral			l			
Approximant				j	w	
Trill			r			

1. /β/ is heard as a glide [w] after /k/.

Vowels
	Front		Back	
	unrounded	rounded	unrounded	rounded
High	i	y	ɯ	u
Low	e	ø	a	o

Tones
