= Teococuilco de Marcos Pérez =

- Municipality and town
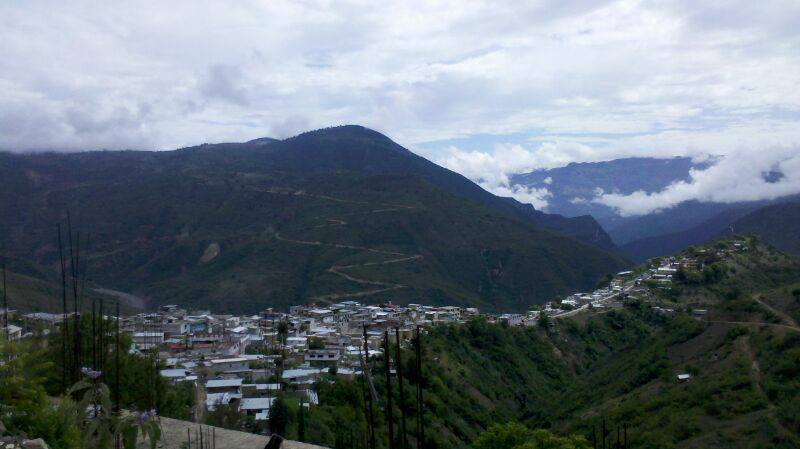

- Location in Mexico
- Coordinates: 17°22′N 96°37′W
- Country: Mexico
- State: Oaxaca
- Time zone: UTC-6 (Central Standard Time)

Teococuilco de Marcos Pérez is a town and municipality in Oaxaca in south-western Mexico. The municipality covers an area of km^{2}. It is part of the Ixtlán District in the Sierra Norte region.

As of 2005, the municipality had a total population of .

== History ==
Teococuilco was a prehispanic Zapotec settlement. The prehispanic lord of Teococuiclco held a high degree of power over his subjects and demanded absolute obedience from them, enforcing loyalty through assistants called tequitlatos. Anyone who met with the lord was obliged to remove their shoes and maintain their head down. This level of reverence was still present by 1580. Sacrifices and offerings were made to the god Coquebezelao on a nearby hill. Human sacrifices were carried out on the eve of the renewal of the 260-day ritual calendar, followed by a feast on the first day of the new year. At the age of seven, future priests were taken to the temple or houses of instruction to study rituals. They were obliged to maintain chastity, sobriety, and frequent fasts, and breaking their vows was punishable by death. The caciques consulted the priests before wars, marriages, negotiations, or hunts.
