= Santiago Comaltepec =

Santiago Comaltepec Moꞌiaˊ
- Municipality and town
- Location in Mexico
- Coordinates: 17°34′N 96°33′W
- Country: Mexico
- State: Oaxaca

Area
  - Total: 65.07 km^{2} (25.12 sq mi)
- Time zone: UTC-6 (Central Standard Time)

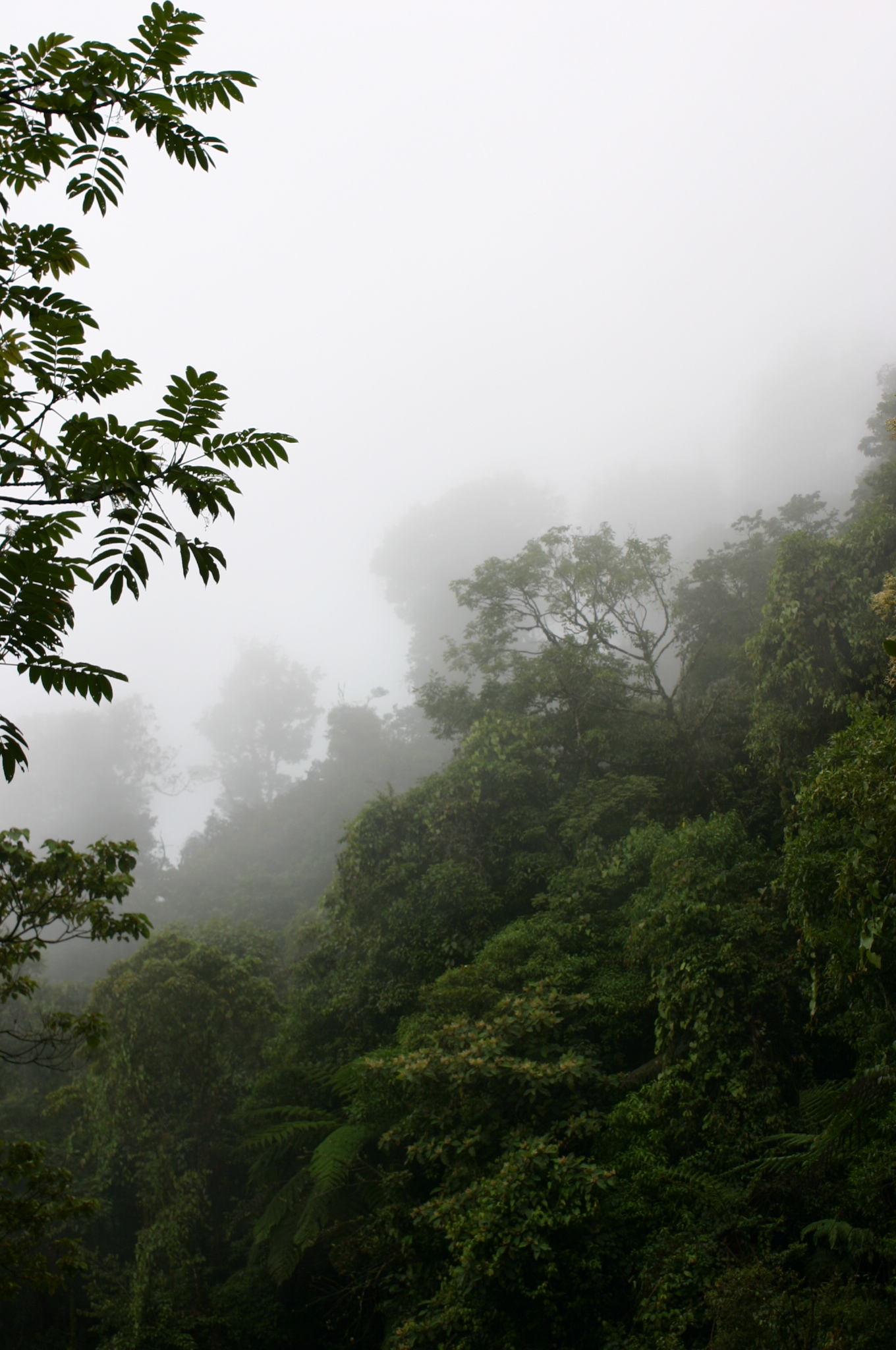
The Cloud Forest of Santiago Comaltepec is some the best conserved in the world

Santiago Comaltepec (Comaltepec Chinantec: Moꞌiaˊ) is a town and municipality in Oaxaca in south-western Mexico. It is part of the Ixtlán District in the Sierra Norte region.

== Geography ==
The municipality covers an area of 65.07 km^{2} and is about 2,000 meters above sea level. The region is covered with cloud forests of oak and pine wood. Fruit trees include apple, peach, orange and banana. Wild animals include badger, mountain lion, boar and fox. Trout and crappie are found in the streams.

== Demography ==
As of 2005, the municipality had 336 households with a total population of 1,386 of whom 1,203 spoke an indigenous language, Highland Chinantec. The roads are unpaved. The main economic activities were agriculture, hunting and fishing.
