= Tlacolula de Matamoros =

Tlacolula de Matamoros Bac (Zapotec) Tlacolula
- City and municipality
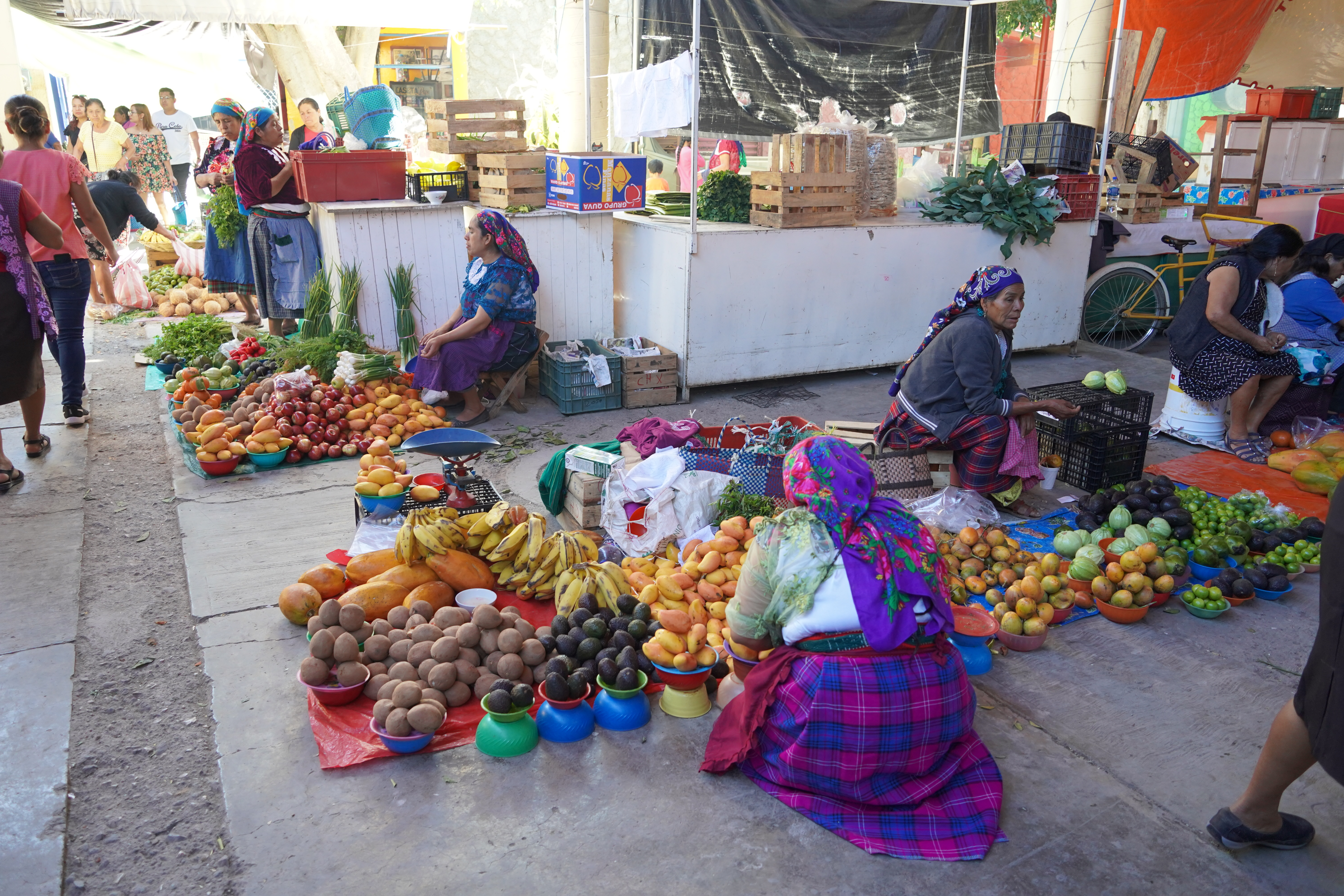
- Indigenous woman selling at the municipal market

- Location within Mexico
- Coordinates: 16°57′15″N 96°28′45″W
- Country: Mexico
- State: Oaxaca
- Founded: 1560

Government
  - Municipal President: Rolando López Maldonado
- Elevation (of seat): 1,600 m (5,200 ft)

Population (2005) Municipality
  - Municipality: 16,510
  - Seat: 14,074
- Time zone: UTC-6 (Central (US Central))
- Postal code (of seat): 70403
- Website: www.tlacolula.gob.mx (in Spanish)

Tlacolula de Matamoros is a city and municipality in the Mexican state of Oaxaca, about 30 km from the center of the city of Oaxaca on Federal Highway 190, which leads east to Mitla and the Isthmus of Tehuantepec. It is part of the Tlacolula District in the east of the Valles Centrales Region.

The city is the main commercial center for the Tlacolula Valley area, and best known for its weekly open air market held on Sundays. This market is one of the oldest, largest and busiest in Oaxaca, mostly selling food and other necessities for the many rural people which come into town on this day to shop. The city is also home to a 16th-century Dominican church, whose chapel, the Capilla del Señor de Tlacolula, is known for its ornate Baroque decoration and a crucifix to which have been ascribed many miracles. Outside the city proper, the municipality is home to the Yagul archeological site. and a number of a group of one hundred caves and rock shelters which document the pre-historic transition of people from hunting and gathering to agriculture based on the domestication of corn and other plants.

The name most likely comes from the Nahuatl phrase tlacolullan, which means "place of abundance." However, some trace the origin to the Nahuatl phrase tlacololli, which means "something twisted." Its original Zapotec name was Guillbaan, which means "village of the burials." The appendage "de Matamoros" is to honor Mariano Matamoros of the Mexican War of Independence.

== History ==
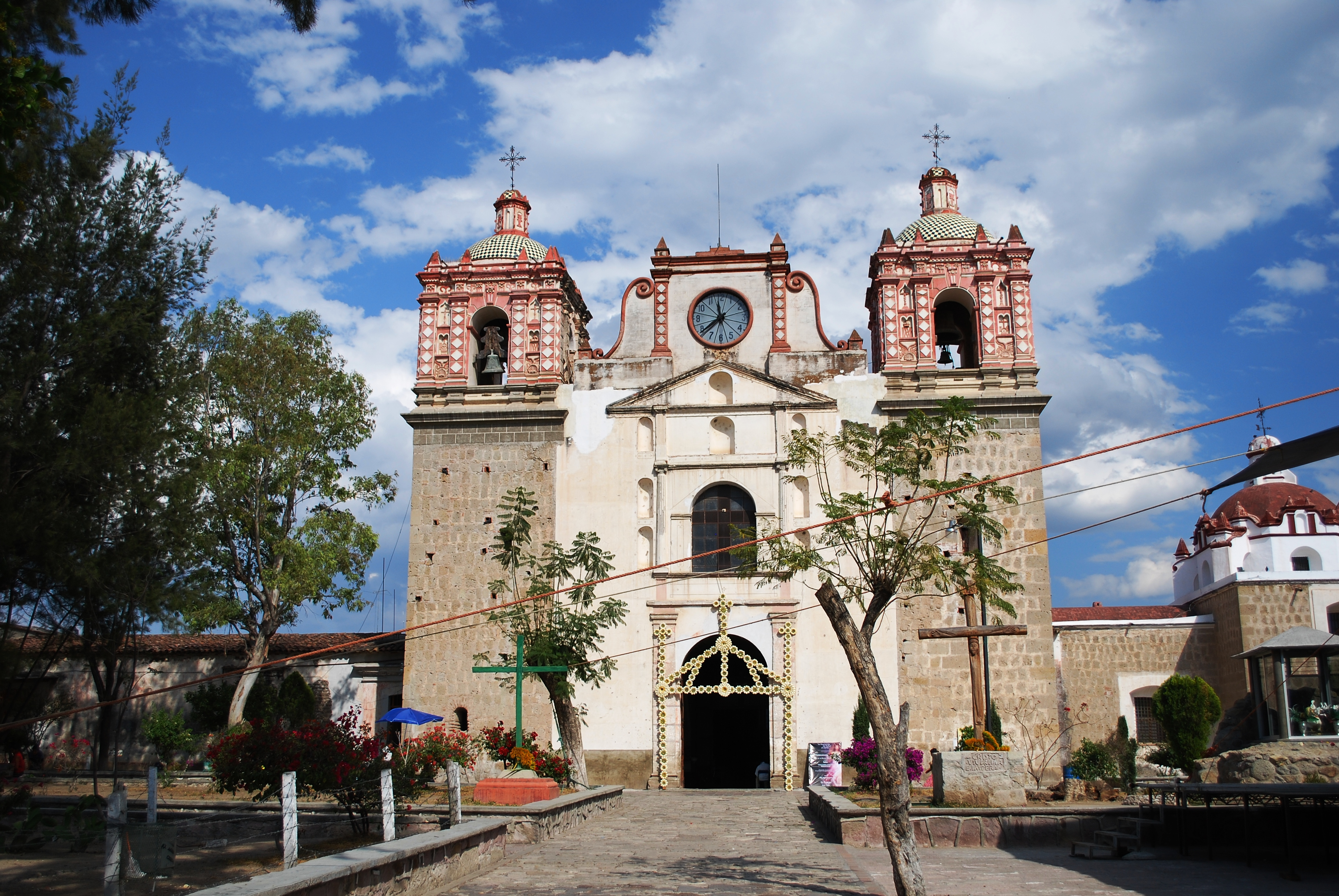
Facade of the La Asuncion church

The Zapotecs probably arrived in the central valleys of Oaxaca in the 2nd century CE. At that time, much of the Tlacolula area was covered by a lake. Fray Juan de Torquemada thought that the Zapotecs arrived from a region called Panuco and established themselves first at Tule, with the first dominant settlement at Teotitlán del Valle. The early populations eventually drained the lake, and built a number of settlements. The first settlement nearest the modern city is at what is now San Antonio de la Cal, which was established around 1250 Eventually, the Zapotecs dominated most of the central valleys area. Tradition states that the city was first founded in Yagul, now an archeological site. The main idol worshipped in Tlacolula was Coque Cehuiyo, and religious sacrifices included dogs, turkeys and humans. Although Tlacolula had its own ruler, it recognized that Zaachila had some measure of political authority.

There are two competing stories as to how the modern settlement was established by the Spanish. The first states that it was founded as a way station for Europeans traveling to and from the Isthmus of Tehuantepec at the location between the Salado and Seco Rivers. However, flooding forced the community to move to the present location. The other version has the settlement founded by friars Gonzalo Lucero and Bernardino de Minaya as an evangelization center and monastery, to which the native population eventually drifted. Either way, the settlement was formally established as Santa Maria de la Asuncion Tlacolula in 1560. One of the first major constructions in the Spanish settlement was the Church of La Asunción in 1561. Many of the religious festivals which continue to this day were established around the same time.

After the establishment of the town, several haciendas were established belonging to the Alferez, Taniye and Soriano families.

During the Mexican Revolution, factions loyal to Venustiano Carranza and Francisco Villa fought for dominance here, with battles in the Sierra Juárez mountains and at the city itself.

During the 1960s and 1970s, the city was well known for counterfeit goods, which was mostly eliminated in the 1980s. Since the 2000s, it has been making a comeback, especially in the form of unlicensed CDs and DVDs.

During the 2006 Oaxaca protests, a number of "community radio stations" established to provide alternative outlets of information and propaganda. Since this time, most of these stations, including Radio Tlacolula (https://web.archive.org/web/20091226234239/http://tlacolularadio.msdnoticias.com/), have not been able to get operating licenses from the federal government and exist illegally. They have also been the target of opposition forces seeking to shut them down. One effort to do so was attempted in 2008, but it was not successful.

Political tensions related to the election of a new municipal president have existed since 2009, with no apparent candidate. Much of the reason for this is the lack of support by the ejidos, or communal farm organizations. This issue for the ejidos is that the candidate must be from Tlacolula, and not candidates chosen by or associated with the state's dominant PRI party. The current president is from the PAN party, but is an ex-PRI member who is accused of blackmail. The members of the ejidos have the right to nominate or support candidates collectively, which is normally done at a meeting called the "Caudillo del Sur." Municipal elections are scheduled to be held in 2010.

In the early part of 2010, about 800 people organized into groups calling themselves "14 de junio," "and "1 de mayo," and took over lands legally belonging to Chagoya family. The people claim that they were not in possession of the land illegally and that Roberto Chagoya donated the land to families unable to afford to buy their own. The title of the land is under dispute with Ernesto Chagoya claiming ownership and denouncing the occupation. On 12 April 2010, municipal police forced the people off the land and the organizations have sought help from APPO and other organizations.

== The city ==
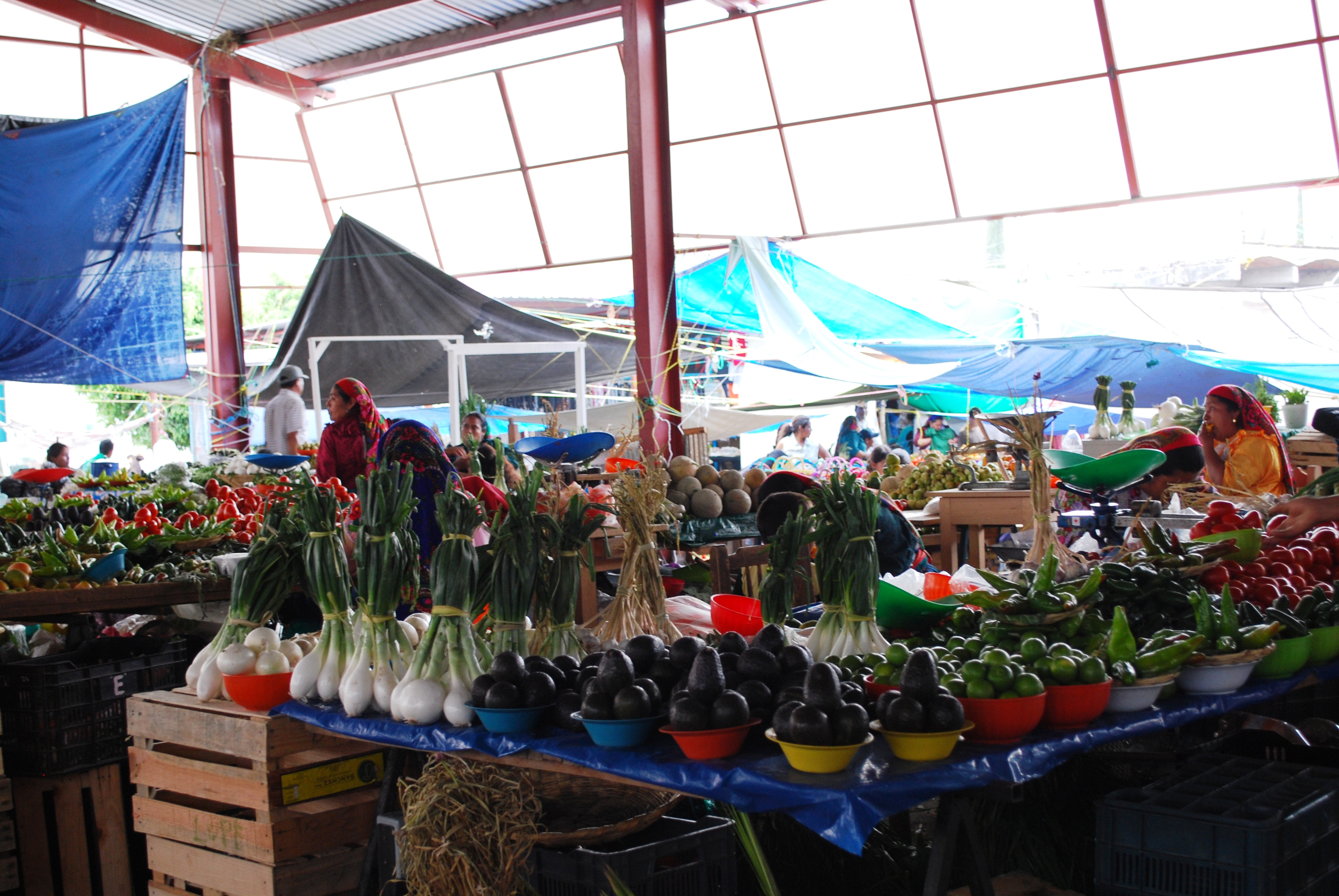
Fruits and vegetables at the municipal market

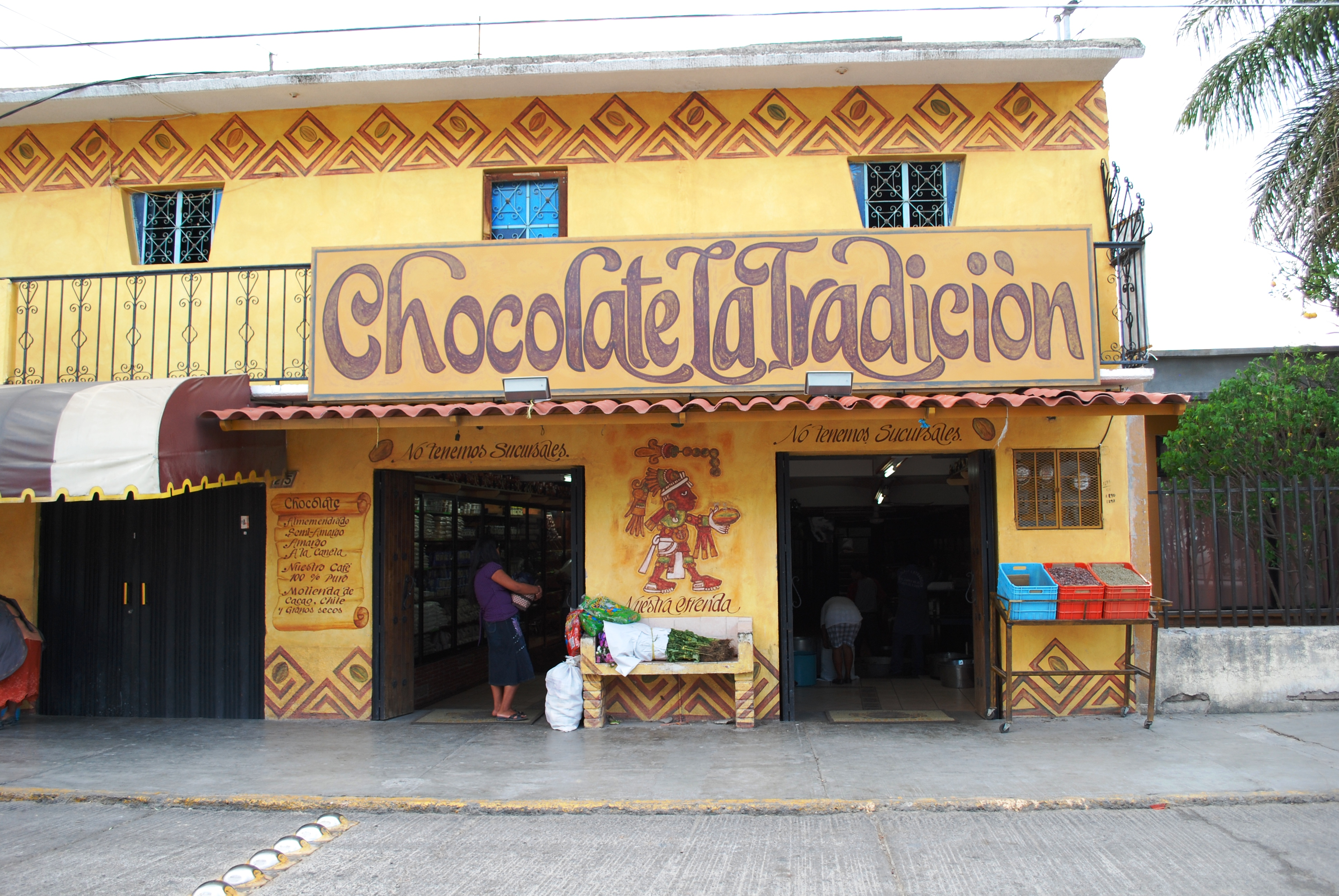
Chocolate La Tradición

The city is the commercial and political center of the Tlacolula Valley, which is named after it. This valley is home to over 60,000 people, many of whom are Zapotec speakers. The streets of the city form rectangular grid, which spreads out from the 17th century Church of La Asunción and its adjoining plaza. The main street extends north–south and connects to the Pan American Highway (Federal Highway 190). This main street is lined with permanents shops, which are open on Sundays for the customers that come into town for the weekly market. Two notable stores along this street are the Mezcal Pensamento outlet and Chocolate la Tradición. Tlacolula is a major mezcal producer, and Mezcal Pensamento offers more than twenty varieties, many of which are flavored with fruit, coffee and more. At Chocolate la Tradición, chocolate is ground and mixed with sugar, spices and other ingredients to make chocolate for drinking or to use in the making of moles. Much of the chocolate sold here is for consumption in the more rural areas. Hot chocolate is a widely consumed beverage in the valley, prepared with either milk or water, and usually eaten with locally made "pan de yema" or egg yolk bread. Another important commercial location is the permanent municipal market which is located just off the main plaza. This market consists of two fifty by twenty meter semi-enclosed areas, each of which houses scores of vendors, mostly selling basic staples. It is known for its breads, ice cream and traditional cooking utensils such as comals and metates as well as traditional clothing. This market has a large food area that prepares many of the area's local and regional specialties, such as various moles (Colorado, amarillo, verde and chichilo) as well as tlayudas and meats in sauces based on tomatoes and beans. Chapulines (edible grasshoppers) can be found as well. The local version of barbacoa is with goat meat in a dark red broth. The stew is accompanied by fresh corn tortillas, cabbage, radishes, cilantro and lime. Another traditional meal is to buy your meat and have it grilled on the spot, served with tortillas and condiments.

Tlacolula also has an old train station, which no longer hosts trains but does contain businesses such as a those selling bacon, fireworks and other products. The Casa de Cultura is in the municipal palace and sponsored by the Instituto Oaxaqueño de las Culturas.

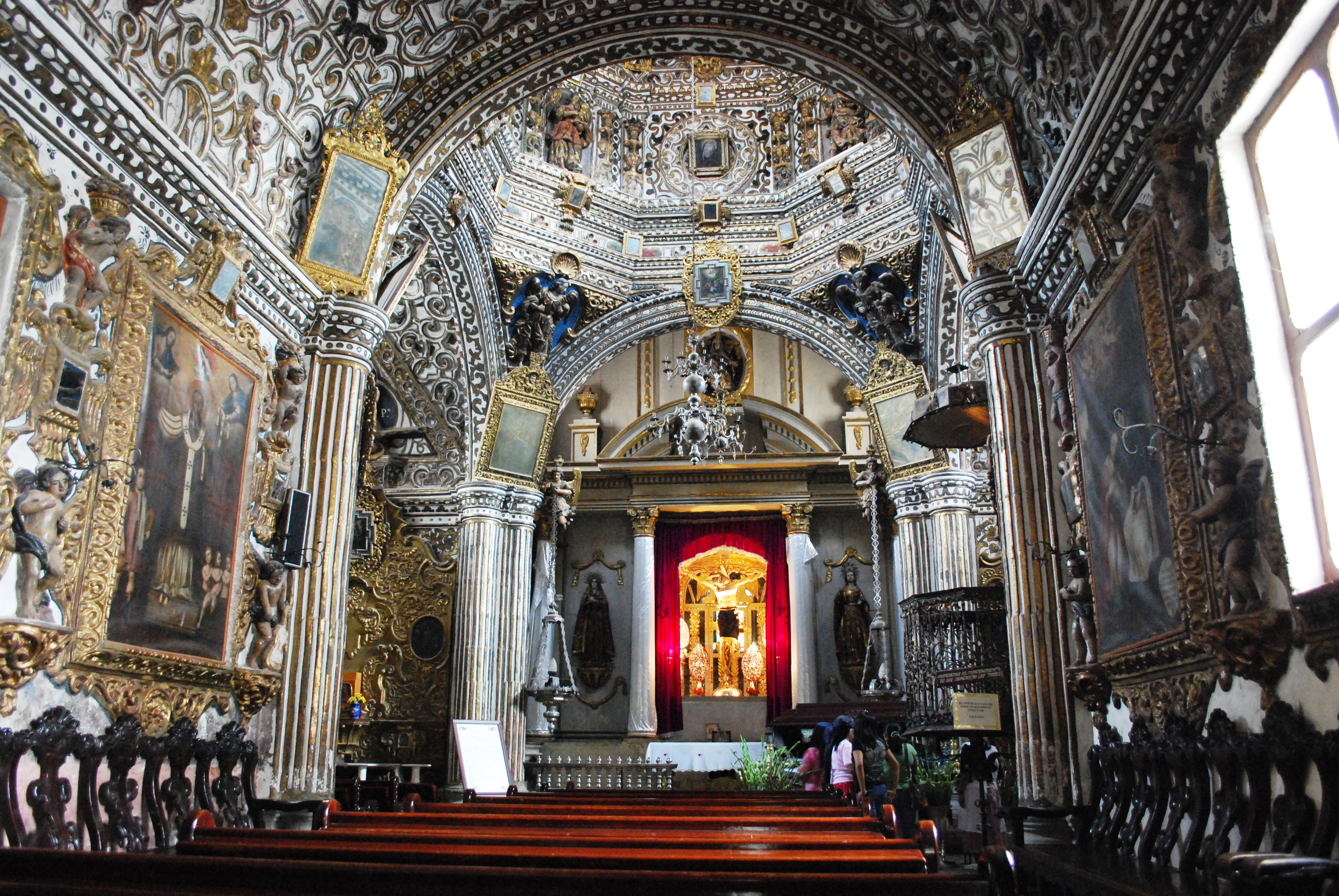
Altar area of the Capilla del Señor de Tlacolula

The parish church, called the Church of "La Asunción de Nuestra Señora" was founded as a Dominican mission in the mid 16th century. It consists of the main church and the Chapel of the Señor del Tlacolula. The exterior and interior of the church are largely similar to other Dominican churches in the Central Valleys of Oaxaca; the retablos are adorned with silver, and the doors have ornate ironwork. In the "coro alto" (rear gallery) stands a large baroque pipe organ, restored in 2014.

A notable feature is the Baroque chapel dedicated to a crucifix called the Señor de Tlacolula, one of several "black Christ" images (Chalma, Esquipulas, Ocotitlan) that appeared mysteriously, and to which miracles are attributed. This chapel can be accessed directly from the atrium but the main entrance is from the a main nave of the church through an ornate iron gate guarded by statues. The chapel is elaborately and ornately decorated, and some of saints are depicted in unusual ways. The chapel is a regional pilgrimage site. The widespread devotion to the Señor is such that Pope Pius VII issued an indulgence stating that priests officiating at this altar can have the sins of one who has recently died completely forgiven.

The city hosts a number of religious and secular festivals during the year. Religious festivals include the feast of the Virgen del Rosario, (which was filmed by researchers from the University of Arizona), Day of the Dead and the feast of the Señor de Tlacolula. For Day of the Dead, the municipality sponsors an "ofrenda" (Day of the Dead altar) for grade school children. The first prize was $5000 MXN. The feast of the Christ of Tlacolula is held on the second Sunday of October, lasting five days, which is celebrated not only with traditional Masses, processions, folk dances and fireworks, but also with the Mixtec version of the Mesoamerican ball game. The "Fiestas de las Cruces" last for two months from May to the early part of July. To promote its principle products, the city hosts the annual Feria de Mezcal, Artesanía y Gastronomía (Mezcal, Crafts and Gastronomy Festival) in October.

Despite its city status, one rural indigenous custom which is still practiced is the "tequio." This is a form of communal work which is unpaid and done by community members for the public benefit. It is most often performed for infrastructure services such as laying water mains. Sometimes the tequio also consists of paying for part of the project. Another tradition which can still be found is the use of a "marriage broker" to get families to agree to the event.

== The Sunday market ==
The Sunday open air market (or tianguis) of Tlacolula is one of the oldest continuous in Mesoamerica and the largest and busiest in the Central Valley region of Oaxaca. The only market of any type which is larger is the Centro de Abastos (main grocery market selling to retailers) in the city of Oaxaca. This market is part of a tradition of weekly markets which is still found in Oaxaca, where people from rural areas come the local town to buy, sell and socialize, and are a functional feature of pre-modern peasant economies. The market provides a retail outlet for those living in communities too small to support permanent retail establishments.

Each Sunday, very early in the morning, officials close the main street for eight blocks between the main plaza and the bus station, near the highway. Paying fees for the right, vendors set up stalls all over these main road and along adjoining parts of the cross streets as well. Most are covered by low hanging colorful tarps which provide protection from sun and rain and almost completely cover the streets from the buildings on one side to those on the other. The most crowded and the most desired locations are those near the plaza and the permanent municipal market buildings. The main church and the municipal palace are both barely visible above all the tarps. Both pedestrian traffic and number of stalls decrease, the further way one gets from this area.

The stalls here are set up early in the morning and taken down that night. The number of vendors on any given Sunday varies but the number usually exceeds 1,000. Counts have been as high as 1,400 and 1,600. Stalls divide into three types. The first is a simple cloth on the ground, with the vendor sitting or kneeling behind it and his/her wares all day. This cloth may contain only a few items or it may be full to the edge. The second type is a simple table or stacked boxes. The third is a stall with walls, often constructed of interconnecting metal rods. They type of stall used depends on the economics of the vendors and the types of products they sell. In addition to the stalls, street vendors walk around the market carrying their goods with them, approaching potential customers to ask for a sale.

Generally, the Sunday merchants sell everyday household items, agricultural products, prepared foods, farm animals, mezcal, clothing, jewelry, kitchen utensils, audio CDs, tools, pottery for everyday use rather than purely decorative or tourist items such as barro negro pottery. Also not generally sold are heavy, bulky goods, which cannot be carried away by hand. While it is not unusual to see bananas stacked next to blue jeans, next to tools, most vendors of similar items tend to group together in certain zones. This is not done by formal agreement, mostly tradition, social contacts and economy play roles. For example, the sellers of rugs and blankets group together north of the churchyard, across from a grouping of vendors selling expensive handmade vests. This agglomeration has advantages for both buyer and seller. In this way, a wider range of goods can be offered and comparison shopping is somewhat possible. However, not all vendors of the same merchandise choose to sell near their competitors for a number of reasons, they do not want to compete price-wise, the stall space is too expensive or they use loudspeakers to attract customers.

Market day is considered a festive day in Oaxacan towns. Ranchers, farmers and other people from rural areas come to the city to sell shop and socialize. Products, especially certain prepared foods, are available here that are generally not anywhere else. One example is tejate, a fermented corn and mamey seed drink. Most of the rural people who come to town on Sunday are indigenous, and seeing women dressed in colorful traditional garb, such as rebozos, embroidered blouses and wool skirts, is more common on this day than even in the municipal market during the week. Many of the indigenous women's home village can be identified by their clothing. It is common to see native women carrying bundles on their backs or on their heads. This is because most sellers are women.(psabor) These women tend to be quite traditional, speaking Zapotec, trading items instead of accepting money and not permitting the taking of their photographs.

In the 1960s and 1970s, locals used to jokingly refer to this market as "Tokiolula" since it carried many counterfeit and cheap items from Asia. While the counterfeit goods were mostly eliminated in the 1980s, unauthorized CDs and DVDs, as well as other counterfeit goods have made their way back into the otherwise traditional market.

== The municipality ==
=== Political structure ===
As municipal seat, the city of Tlacolula is the governing authority for sixteen other named localities, the largest of which are San Marcos Tlapazola (pop.1114), San Luis del Rio (pop. 472) and Tanivé (pop. 247). Over 85% of the municipalities population of 16,510 (2005) lives in the city proper,(inegi) with just over 4,000 who speak an indigenous language. The municipality covers an area of 244.96km^{2} and borders the municipalities of Santa Ana del Valle, Villa Díaz Ordaz, San Pablo Villa de Mitla, Magdalena Teitipac, San Bartolomé Quialana, San Lucas Quiaviní, Santiago Matatlán, San Dionisio Ocotepec, San Juan Guelavía, Santa Cruz Papalutla, San Lorenzo Albarradas and San Pedro Quiatoni.

=== Geography ===
The city is located in the Tlacolula Valley, which is a broad valley with rich, volcanic soils. The climate is a cross between steppe and savannah. It only receives about fifty millimeters of rain per year, but its relatively cool climate allows this to be just sufficient to be classified as humid. Most of this falls in the summer and fall. Within the valley, the ground is small plains broken up by rolling hills and small streams, with larger mountains on the municipality's edge. Most of the wild plants consist of grasses with cactus and other arid area plants, such as mesquite. Wildlife consists of small mammals such as rabbits, opossums and moles along some species of birds. Rarely, an eagle can be seen.

=== Economy ===
Tlacolula is an urban commercial center for this part of the central valleys region of Oaxaca. Only a small percentage (23%) of the municipal population is engaged in agriculture as a primary means of support. Most of the population is dedicated to commerce serving the Tlacolula district (50%) and the production crafts, mezcal and other items.(25%). In recent years, the production and sale of counterfeit items has increased significantly, especially at the weekly Sunday market. While tourism has not been a significant part of the economy, the municipality has taken steps to promote its attractions, such as the 16th century church and its archeological sites. The municipality also participates in the annual Guelaguetza festival in the city of Oaxaca to showcase its culture.

The area still has serious problems with poverty, with many social services such as education, sanitation and health services insufficient or lacking. This is particularly true in the outlying areas. For this reason, many residents of the municipality has immigrated to the United States, mostly congregating in the Venice Beach area of southern California. Many Zapotec-speaking peoples from the area work in stalls along the boardwalk or as cooks, waiters and mains in the upscale restaurants and hotels of Santa Monica. So many live in this area that Zapotec is the mother tongue for about thirty percent of school children in certain neighborhoods.

=== Tlacolula Valley Zapotec language ===
In April 2014, linguist Brook Danielle Lillehaugen, along with students from Haverford and Swarthmore Colleges, visited Tlacolula de Matamoros to present an online Tlacolula Valley Zapotec talking dictionary to local leaders. It was estimated that about 100 elderly speakers of this Zapotecan language remain.

=== Archeological sites and culture ===
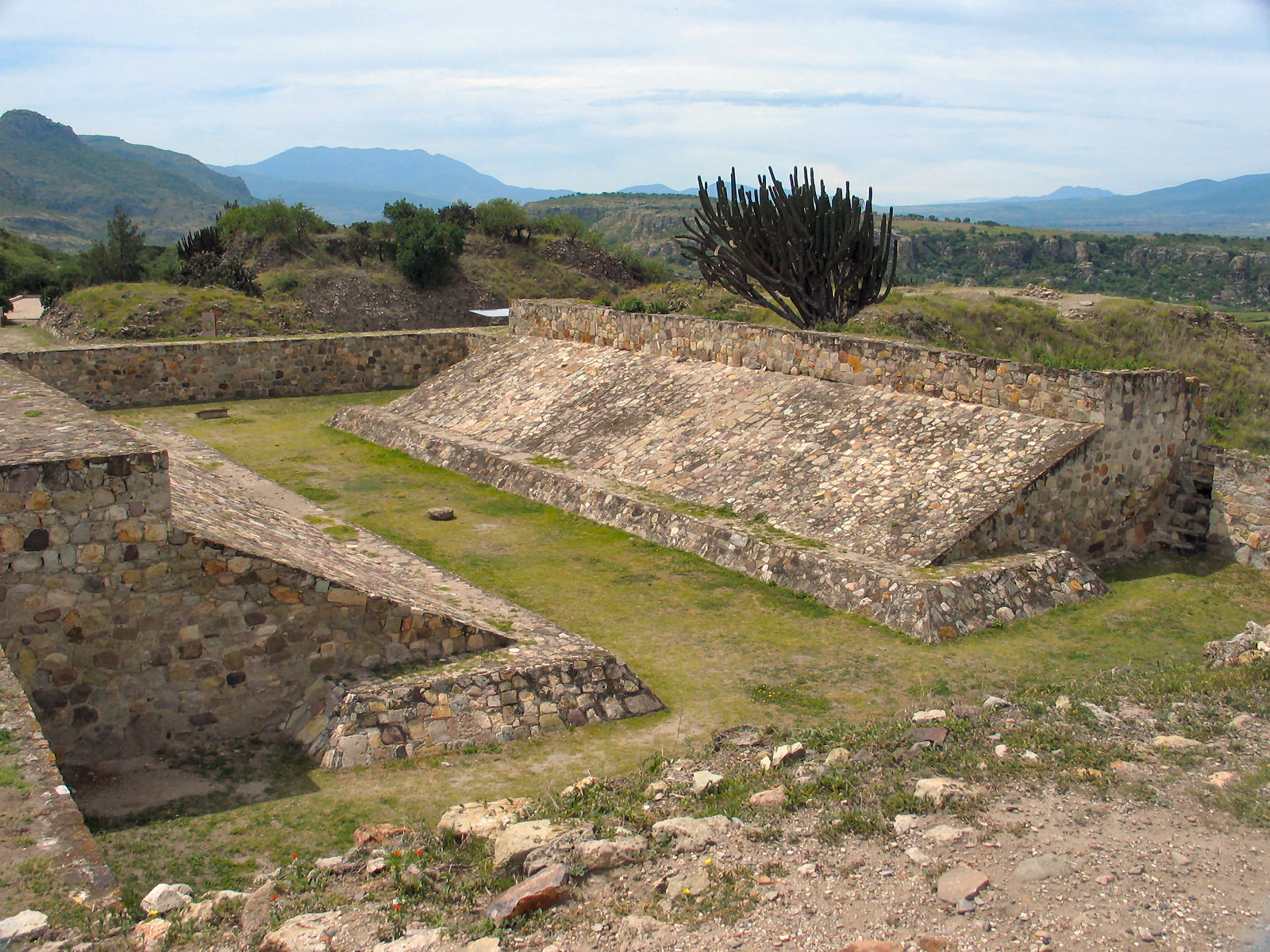
Ballcourt at Yagul

The best known archeological site within the municipality proper is Yagul, a former city-state associated with the Zapotec civilization. The site was declared one of the country's four Natural Monuments on 13 October 1998. The site is also known locally as Pueblo Viejo (Old Village) and was occupied at the time of the Spanish Conquest. After the Conquest the population was relocated to modern Tlacolula where their descendants still live. Yagul was first occupied around 500–100 BC. Around 500–700 AD, residential, civic and ceremonial structures were built at the site. However, most of the visible remains date to 1250–1521 AD, when the site functioned as the capital of a Postclassic city-state. The site was excavated in the 1950s and 60s by archaeologists Ignacio Bernal and John Paddock.

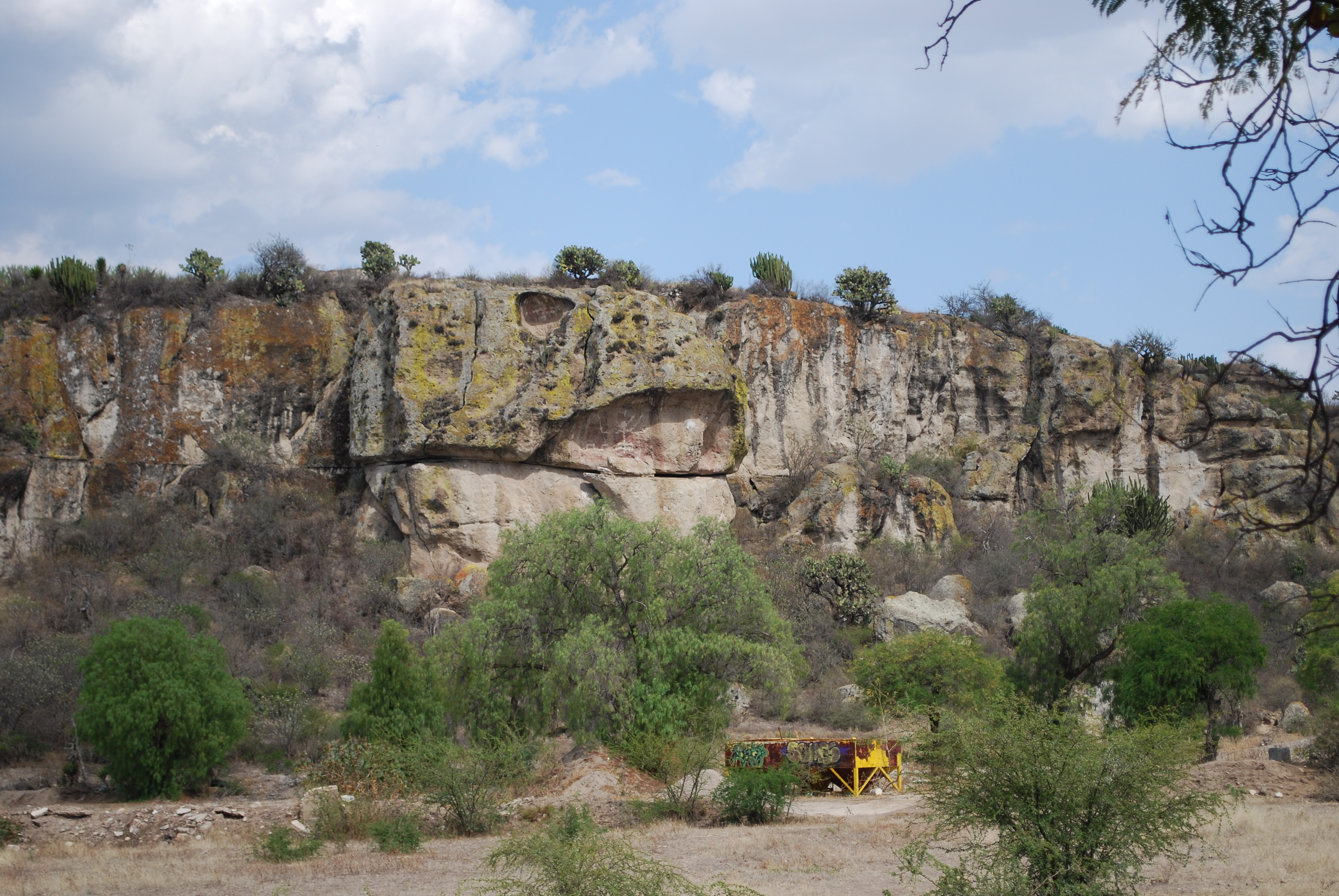
Rock shelter with human figure etched into it on the road to Yagul

More recently catalogued and recognized are a group of about one hundred caves and rock shelters in the Tlacolula Valley which are found in the Tlacolula and other municipalities. The significance of these caves is that many have pre-historic cave paintings and/or evidence of the transition of humans from hunter/gatherers to sedentary farmers due to the domestication of corn and other plants on the American continent. INAH has worked to recommended these caves to become a World Heritage Site with investigation and documentation ongoing. The site was inscribed onto Mexico's "Lista Indicativa de México" in the 2000s and WHS recognition was received in 2007.

The caves and rock shelters vary in size and what they contain. Many contain paintings and other forms of graphic representation. Contents include ceramics and stone tools. The corn materials show similarities to the first vestiges of the domestication of wheat and rye in the Middle East. One of the deepest caves is called the Cueva de la Paloma. The caves have been studied since the 1960s, especially the Cueva de Guilá Naquitz (white stone in Zapotec), which has some of the best evidence for the domestication of corn and squash, which dates back more than 10,000 years. Other caves, such as those near Yagual and Mitla confirm findings at Guilá Naquitz and show human occupation to about 8000 years BCE the sites also show similarities to the Head Smashed and Buffalo Jump Complex sites in Canada. Many more smaller caves with similar artifacts are thought to exist in the area.

One of the local legends is called "La Mujer Coyota" or The Coyote Woman. A young man who was well known for being honest and hardworking fell in love with a woman from another village. Courtship followed in the traditional manner, the two married and he went to live with her. Soon after, the woman confessed that she was a nagual (an Aztec demon) in the form of a coyote. She told the man that if he let her change him into a coyote, they could be together forever. Being in love, the man accepted immediately. As a coyote, the man found that in order to survive, he needed to rob attack farm animals and eat the meat raw, which he had never done before. He also found that the other coyotes did not respect him, and sniffed about his woman. One day, his hunger took him to his old village and to the home of his former childhood friend. He tried to steal food from his friend, only to be attacked with a machete. He friend cried that he was a no good coyote who had no idea how to earn his bread. Upon hearing this, the man felt shame. He returned to his wife as asked her to change him back into a man, which she did cursing. Returned to human form, the man killed his wife-coyote and returned to being an honest worker.

== See also ==
- Dainzú
- Yagul
