= Teitipac =

Teitipac may refer to different places in Tlacolula District, Oaxaca, Mexico:

- Magdalena Teitipac
- San Sebastián Teitipac
- San Juan Teitipac
