= San Pablo Villa de Mitla =

San Pablo Villa de Mitla Mitla
- Town & Municipality
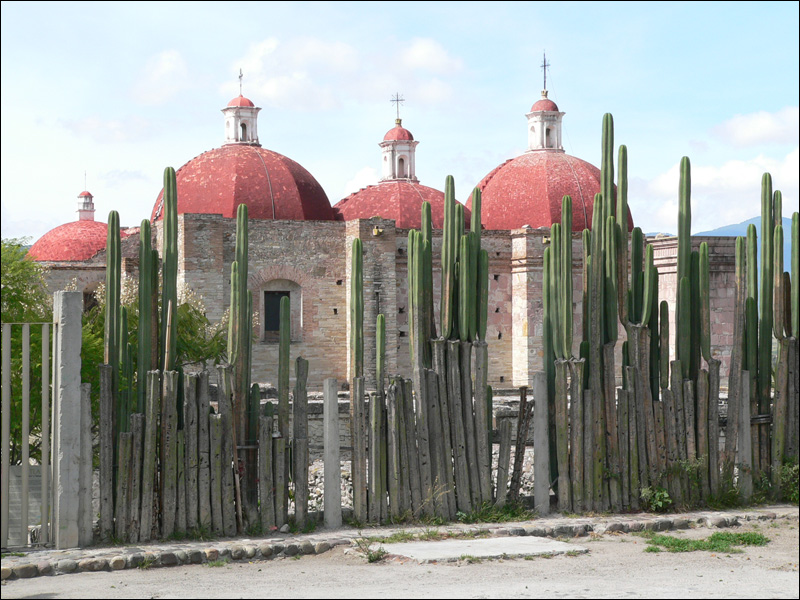
- Church of San Pablo in Mitla

- Location in Mexico
- Coordinates: 16°55′15″N 96°21′42″W
- Country: Mexico
- State: Oaxaca

Government
  - Municipal President: Jaciel García Ruiz (2008-2010)

Area
  - Municipality: 82.93 km^{2} (32.02 sq mi)
- Elevation (of seat): 1,680 m (5,510 ft)

Population (2005) Municipality
  - Municipality: 11,219
  - Seat: 7,829
- Time zone: UTC-6 (Central (US Central))
- Website: (in Spanish) site

San Pablo Villa de Mitla is a town and municipality in Mexico that is most famous for being the site of the Mitla archeological ruins. It is part of the Tlacolula District in the east of the Valles Centrales Region. The town is also known for its handcrafted textiles, especially embroidered pieces and mezcal. The town also contains a museum containing a collection of Zapotec and Mixtec cultural items. The name “San Pablo” is in honor of Saint Paul, and “Mitla” is a hispanization of the Nahuatl name “Mictlán.” This is the name the Aztecs gave the old pre-Hispanic city before the Spanish arrived and means “land of the dead.” It is located in the Central Valleys regions of Oaxaca, 46 km from the city of Oaxaca, in the District of Tlacolula.

== Town ==
The town and municipal seat of Mitla is the commercial and tourism center for the area. Many of the houses in the modern town of Mitla are about 200 years old, in a rustic colonial style. In many of these houses are weaving and embroidery workshops which sell to the public. The town has a cultural center or “Casa de Cultura,” which offers classes such as those in traditional dance.

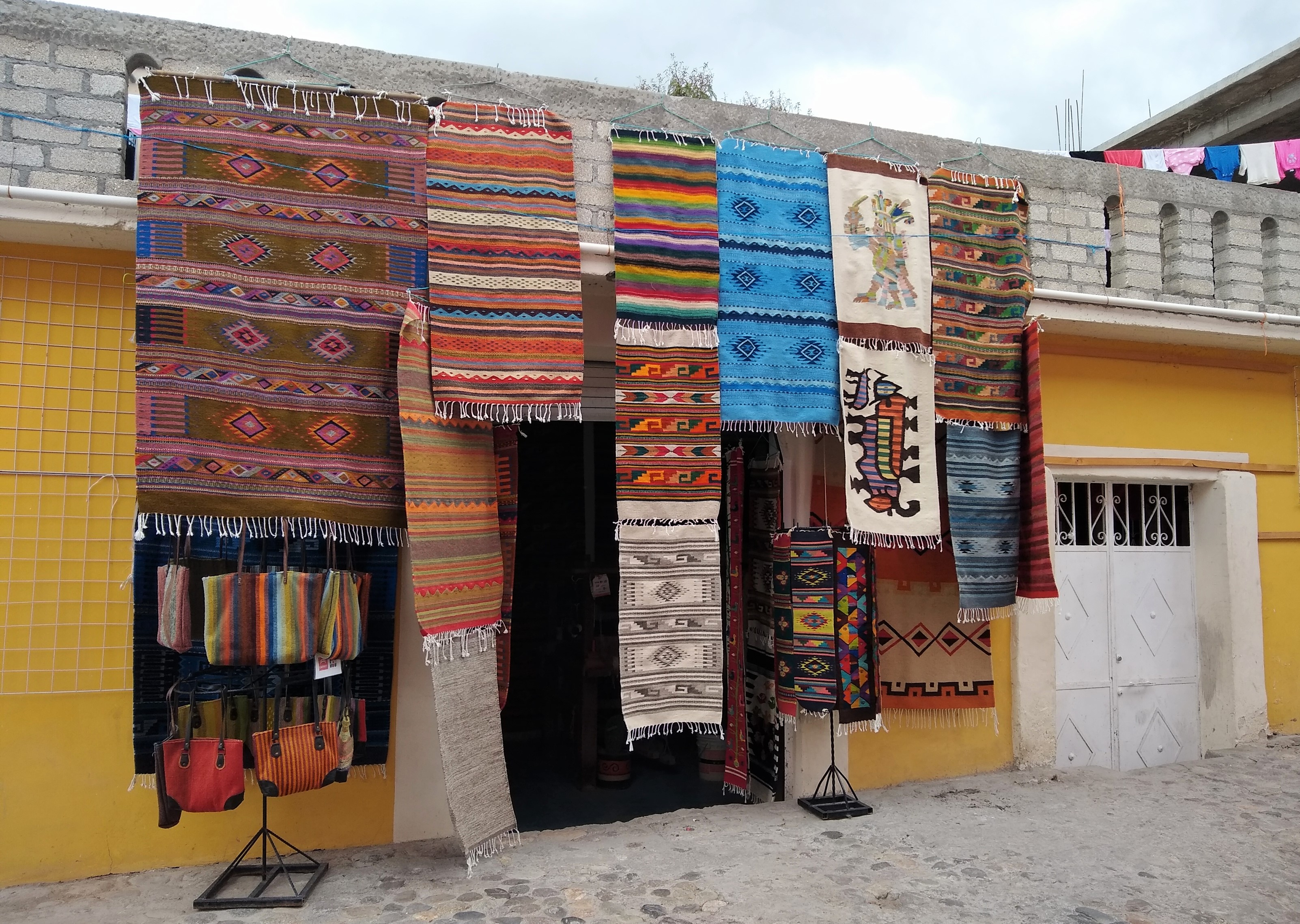
Rugs and textiles for sale in San Pablo Villa de Mitla

There is a small open-air Handcrafts Market just outside the archeological zone. Most of crafts made and sold here are textiles, including hand-woven and hand-embroidered traditional clothing, hammocks, sarapes, rugs, handbags, tablecloths and other items. Necklaces and bracelets are braided from fibers and decorated with beads, seeds, small stones and/or ceramic figures. Many of the designs found on the textiles here come from pre-Hispanic codices and based on Zapotec mythological figures, but more moderns images such as those from modern Mexican painters can be found as well.

The town has two churches, one dedicated to Saint John the Apostle and the other dedicated to Saint Paul. When the Spanish arrived in the 1520s, nothing rivaled pre-Hispanic Mitla as a religious center in the Oaxaca Valley. In 1544, the church of San Pablo was established on part of the ruins of the old Zapotec religious complex. The church sits on a pre-Hispanic platform which now functions as the atrium. Access to the church is through a portal decorated with pyramid-shaped crests and a niche. The church is 39 meters long and twelve wide, with three naves enclosed by lanterned octagonal domes. The vaults were constructed later, perhaps in the 19th century. The squared apse is closed with a circular dome and cupola is not as high as the nave and is likely from the 16th century. Behind it is a larger octagonal dome that encloses the sanctuary, with one other dome enclosing the choir. The wall of the south atrium was originally part of a pre-Hispanic structure and still contains the mosaic fretwork which defines the Zapotec site. The interior of the church is notable for a large number of 16th-century and other colonial-era santos (statues of the saints), many of them done in well-preserved polychrome.

The patron saint of the town, Saint Paul, is celebrated in January with a procession that begins at the Church of San Pablo in the archeological site, passes through the town cemetery and ends at the town center. Drinks of mezcal are offered free to attendees. Most of the population participates in the procession as well as musical groups, and fantasy figures such as giant monkeys are made for the occasion.

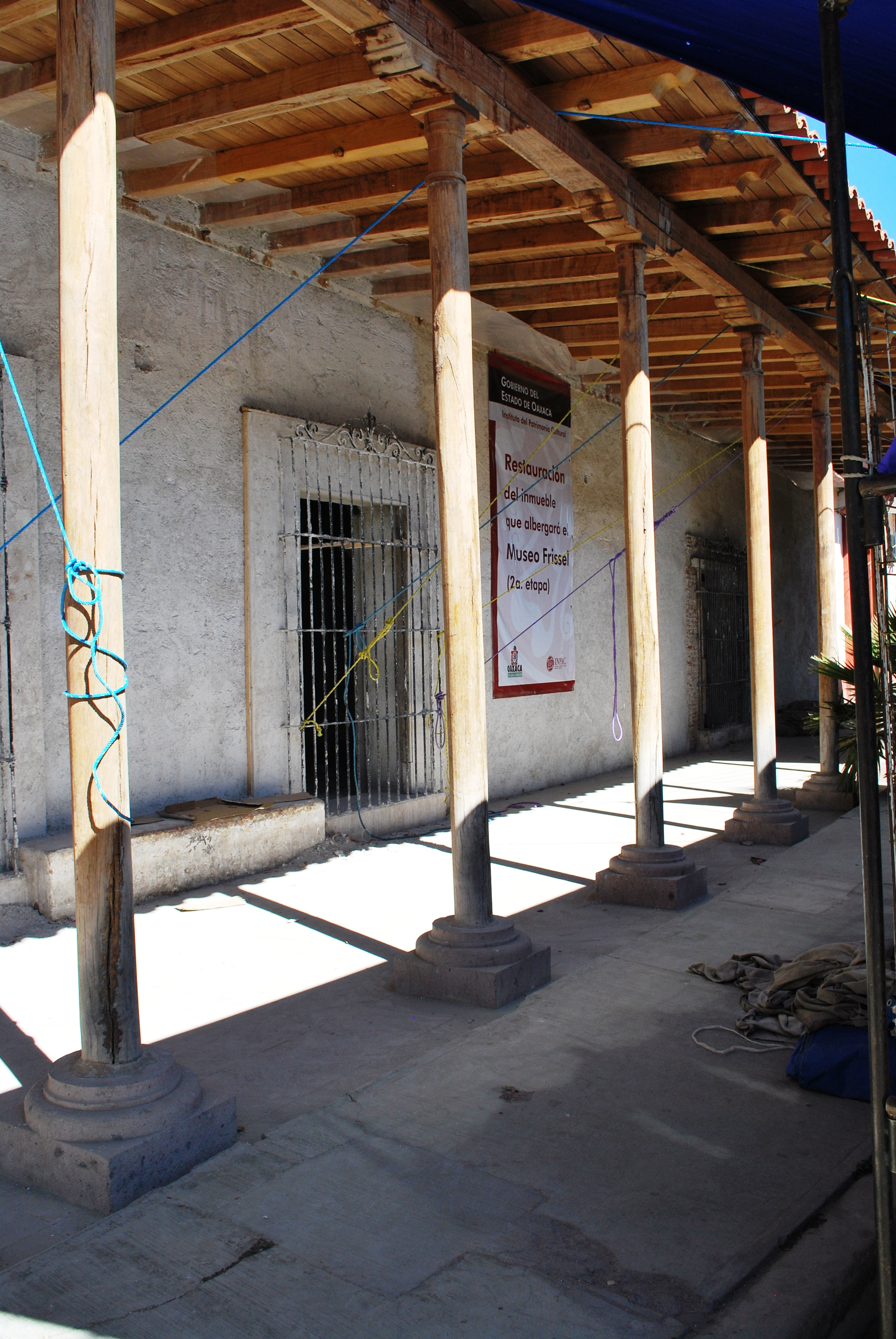
Part of the facade of the Frissell Museum building with sign stating that is it undergoing remodeling.

On Benito Juarez Street, very near the Plaza Central, is the Frissell Museum building. It was formerly an inn named La Sorpresa, that operated mostly in the latter 19th century and early 20th by the Quero family. In the 1950s, the building was sold to American Edwin Robert Frissell. Frissell collected a large number of archeological pieces with which the museum was founded. The museum’s collection was enhanced with donations by Howard Leigh, who collected Zapotec art, and moved his collection here from the city of Oaxaca. The museum was inaugurated in 1950 and was sponsored by a civil association called the Junta Cultural Zapoteca de Mitla.

The museum has various rooms in which pieces are displayed to show the evolution of Zapotec and Mixtec art. Pieces include ceramics such as urns, jars, braziers and mortars, those made of jade and obsidian, a large number of idols, axes and other pieces. The museum's original collection has been estimated at between 40,000 and 80,000 pieces, and it was at one point known as having the largest collection of Zapotec cultural items. The museum was closed without explanation in 1995 and from then until 2001, no one had any idea what was happening. From 2001 Rufino Aguilar Quero and attorneys investigated, and found contracts that specified the conditions of the donations of the pieces by Frissell to UDLA. Frissell stipulated that upon his death, the Mexico City College (today UDLA) would have control of the collection and could not cede it to another institution. Another stipulation was that none of the pieces could be separated from the collection.

A local newspaper reported that the museum building had been sold to José Murat Casab for 1.5 million pesos, against Frissell’s stipulation that the pieces and the building remain together. Sometime between 1995 and 2007, the museum's entire collection disappeared, along with paintings by León Zurita, the visitor log and a stamp collection. In early 2007, Samuel Quero Martínez, Rufino Aguilar Quero and Robert Luís Arreola, residents of Mitla, denounced the sacking of the museum and sale of its pieces, with the government of Oaxaca being suspected of having a role in the affair. Formal charges were filed in 2008.

The dean of UDLA denied the charges, and denied that the pieces were in the school's responsibility when they were found to be missing, but rather the property of INAH as "property of the nation". The dean claimed that the university was not fit to manage such a museum and handed over the management of it to INAH. He also denied selling the building to José Murat Casab, but did make it available to the government of the state of Oaxaca with the possibility of sale. Discussions about the fate of the museum and its collection resurfaced in June 2009, when a group of Mitla residents petitioned INAH for the return of at least thirty percent of the museum's collection.

The museum reopened in August 2023.

== Mitla archeological site ==
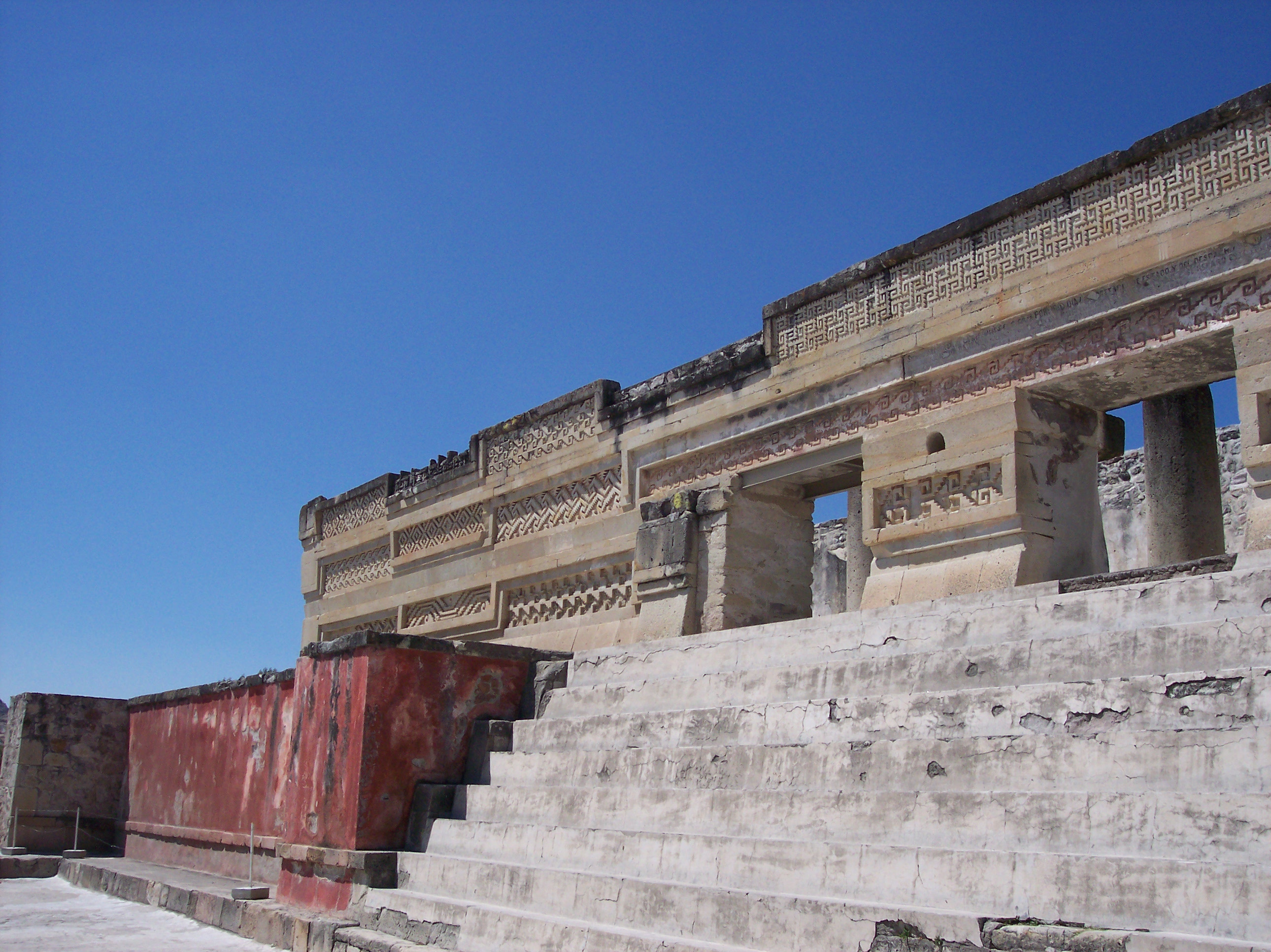
View of the Palace with intricate fretwork

The main attraction is the ruins of the pre-Hispanic city of Mitla, which is best known for its buildings decorated with mosaics of small flat stones that fit together to create designs, especially fretwork. The Mitla is the second most visited archeological zone in the state of Oaxaca. Most of the town's economy is based on tourism to the site, being filled with restaurants, small hotels and shops selling handcrafts and mezcal. However, many residents here feel that the area is not promoted sufficiently by the government. Government sources say that the number of visitors coming to the site is increasing. Most visitors are Mexican nationals who come during the weekends from the neighboring states of Puebla and Veracruz. Most foreign visitors are from Europe. Approximately 500 people a day come to Mitla to visit.

== Municipality ==
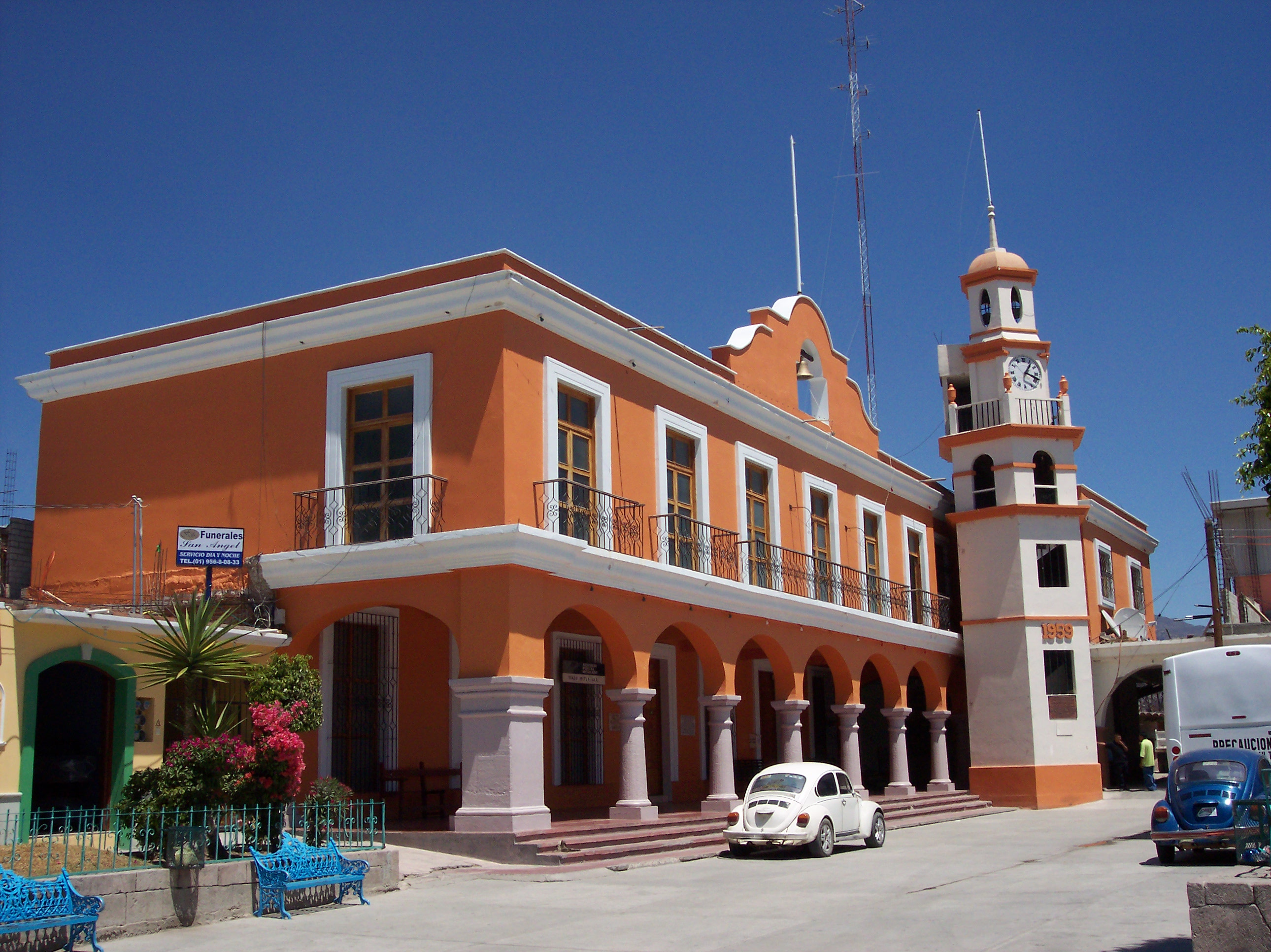
Municipal Palace

As municipal seat, the town of San Pablo Villa de Mitla has governing jurisdiction over the communities of San José del Paso, San Miguel Albarradas, Unión Zapata (Loma Larga), Xaagá, Santa María Albarradas, Don Pedrillo, El Tequio and El Rosario, which cover a territory of 82.93km^{2}. The total population of the municipality as of 2005 is 11,219 people, of which 7,829 or about 70% live in the town proper. 3,655 or about a third of the population speaks an indigenous language. The municipality borders the municipalities of Santo Domingo Albarradas, Villa Díaz Ordaz, Tlacolula de Matamoros, San Lorenzo Albarradas and Santo Domingo Albarradas.

Most of the territory is made up of rolling hills at the foot of the Sierra del Norte. The most notable elevation is the mountain called Dan Guido or Hill of the Temple. Another elevation is called Dan Belgo or Jar Hill. The only major river to cross here is the Grande River with a number of small streams that feed into it, many of which flow only during the rainy season. The climate is temperate and fairly dry. The rainy season is from June to September and in the winter it freezes regularly. The higher elevations have pine forests, with plants such as mesquite, maguey and nopal cactus at the lower, drier areas. The forested areas have small to medium-sized mammals such as wolves, coyotes, deer, wild boar, foxes etc. as well as birds and some poisonous snakes.

About twenty percent of the population is dedicated to agriculture, with 80% working at crafts and/or tourism-related activities. Handcrafts, especially embroidered cloths and woven wool items are an important source of income. These include traditional clothing made on hand-operated looms, as well as hammocks, sarapes, rugs, tablecloths and other items. Many of these items are also embroidered. Jewelry made from natural materials is also available. The municipalities has some quarries for pink “cantera” stone used for building.

To the south of the municipal seat is the Hacianda de Xaga, in which is a cross-shaped tomb decorated with fretwork and conserved its original painting. Another tomb was found at a hill called Guirui as well as the remains of a pre-Hispanic fortification. At a nearby hill called La Forteleza, anthropologists have found 21 skeletons of men, women and children that date back to 500 C.E. Jars, pottery pieces and a jaguar carved in stone have been found as well as corncobs. Excavation of the site was done by Gary Feinman and Linda Nocholas of the Field Museum of Chicago, who consider it one of the most important recent finds of this area.

There is primitive camping available at a small lake located behind a hill that is behind the archeological site; however, a local guide and good camping gear is strongly recommended.

Traditional music here is played by bands of wind instruments and marimbas. The chirimía, a reed instrument of Hispanic origin, can also be heard. The region’s cuisine is based on moles such as negro, verde, amarillo and Colorado. Another popular dish is liver with eggs. Local drinks include hot chocolate made with water instead of milk, corn atole, atole with panela cheese or chocolate, “tejate”, pozole (a fermented corn/cacao drink), a drink made from a fruit called cilacayota and tepache. Mezcal is an important distilled drink here bottled both straight and flavored with additives. The flavored mescals are called “cremas” (crèmes) and come in flavors such as orange, coconut, coffee, lime and others. In Mitla and the surrounding towns are "palenques", small producers of mezcal where they produce the drink by hand from the heart of the agave plant. 5 km from Mitla is a small village called Matatlán, which, due to the number of palenques, is called the "mezcal capital of the world".

The Day of the Dead is an important celebration here as the area has a history of being a place related to rest and the underworld. Ofrendas, or altars, are set up in homes for deceased loved ones. Celebrations begin at midday on 31 October with church bells ringing to receive first the visiting deceased children. On 1 November, families visit graves to clean, decorate and place offerings on family tombs. Fireworks are set off to help the deceased find their way to their former homes. From midday 1 November to midday 2 November, it is believed that the dead are among the living enjoying the food and drinks left on the ofrendas or altars. This activity is known here as “togolear” from the Zapotec word “togool” which means “dead.” On 3 November, a costume party is held in the central park of Mitla. Costumed attendees compete for cash prizes in categories such as originality. On the night of the 3rd, “krewes,” like those that put on events for Carnival, recreate traditional activities, such as weddings, while costumed as skeletons. On 4 November, paintings that have been on display since the 30th of October and judged and awarded prizes.

== Notable people ==
Restaurateur and author Bricia Lopez was born in San Pablo Villa de Mitla.
