= Guelavía =

Guelavía may refer to:

- Guelavía Zapotec, Zapotec language in Oaxaca, Mexico
- San Juan Guelavía, town and municipality in Oaxaca, Mexico
