= San Francisco Lachigoló =

- Municipality and town
- Location in Mexico
- Coordinates: 17°0′N 96°36′W
- Country: Mexico
- State: Oaxaca

Area
  - Total: 31.9 km^{2} (12.3 sq mi)

Population (2005)
  - Total: 1,920
- Time zone: UTC-6 (Central Standard Time)

San Francisco Lachigoló is a town and municipality in Oaxaca in south-western Mexico. The municipality covers an area of 31.9 km^{2}. It is part of the Tlacolula District in the east of the Valles Centrales Region.

As of 1998, the municipality had a total population of 1,920.
