= Santa María Zoquitlán =

- Municipality and town
- Location in Mexico
- Coordinates: 16°33′N 96°23′W
- Country: Mexico
- State: Oaxaca
- Time zone: UTC-6 (Central Standard Time)

Santa María Zoquitlán is a town and municipality in Oaxaca in south-east Mexico. The municipality covers an area of km^{2}. It is part of the Tlacolula District in the east of the Valles Centrales Region.

As of 2005, the municipality had a total population of .
