= Rojas de Cuauhtémoc =

- Municipality and town
- Location in Mexico
- Coordinates: 17°0′18″N 96°37′05″W
- Country: Mexico
- State: Oaxaca

Area
  - Total: 25.52 km^{2} (9.85 sq mi)

Population (2005)
  - Total: 964
- Time zone: UTC-6 (Central Standard Time)

Rojas de Cuauhtémoc is a town and municipality in Oaxaca in south-western Mexico. The municipality covers an area of 25.52 km^{2}. It is part of the Tlacolula District in the east of the Valles Centrales Region.

As of 2005, the municipality had a total population of 964.
