= San Pedro Totolapa =

- Municipality and town
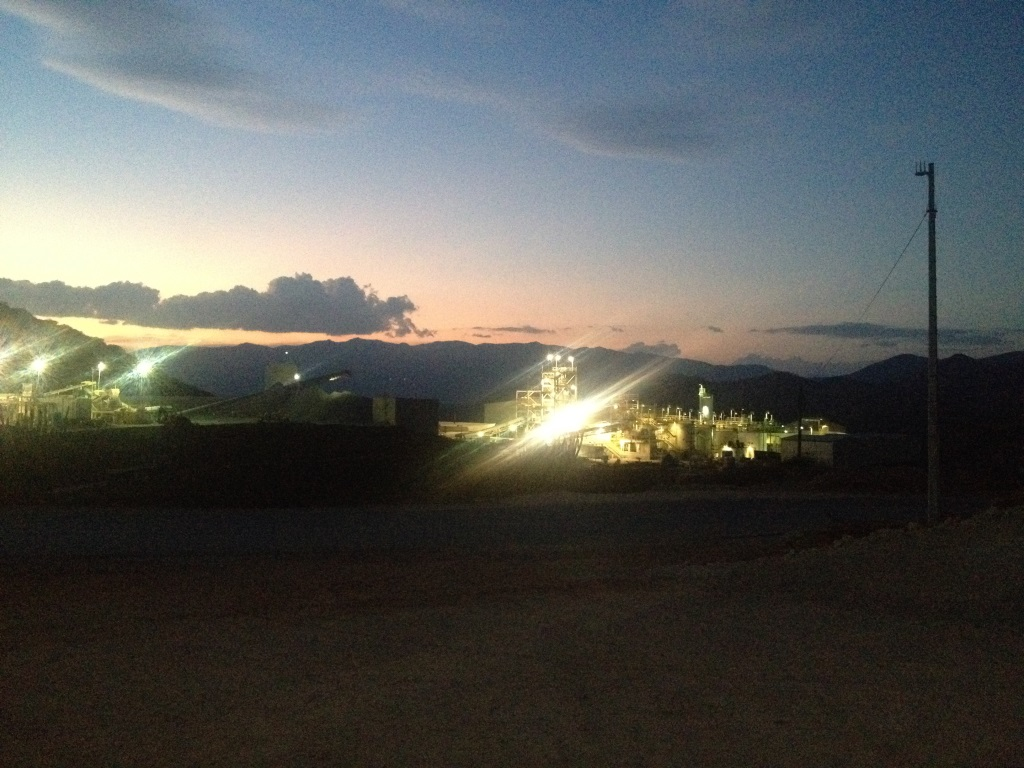
- San Pedro Totolápam, Oax., Mexico

- Location in Mexico
- Coordinates: 16°40′N 96°18′W
- Country: Mexico
- State: Oaxaca
- Time zone: UTC-6 (Central Standard Time)

San Pedro Totolapa is a town and municipality in Oaxaca in south-western Mexico. It is part of the Tlacolula District in the east of the Valles Centrales Region.

As of 2010, the municipality had a total population of 2,603.
