= Tlacolula District =

- District
- Oaxaca regions and districts: Valles Centrales in center
- Coordinates: 16°57′N 96°28′W
- Country: Mexico
- State: Oaxaca

Population (2020)
  - Total: 141,507

Tlacolula District is located in the east of the Valles Centrales Region of the State of Oaxaca, Mexico.

== Municipalities ==
The district includes the following municipalities:

Municipality code	Name	Population		Land Area			Population density	
Municipality code	Name	2020	Rank	km^{2}	sq mi	Rank	2020	Rank
051	Magdalena Teitipac	4,764	10	39.35	15.19	16	121/km^{2} (314/sq mi)	7
078	Rojas de Cuauhtémoc	1,301	24	12.46	4.81	23	104/km^{2} (270/sq mi)	8
118	San Bartolomé Quialana	2,389	17	23.88	9.22	21	100/km^{2} (259/sq mi)	10
131	San Dionisio Ocotepec	11,411	4	310.4	119.8	4	37/km^{2} (95/sq mi)	18
145	San Francisco Lachigoló	5,215	9	11.45	4.42	24	455/km^{2} (1,180/sq mi)	1
550	San Jerónimo Tlacochahuaya	5,764	8	36.66	14.15	17	157/km^{2} (407/sq mi)	4
194	San Juan del Río	1,372	23	71.34	27.54	11	19/km^{2} (50/sq mi)	23
192	San Juan Chilateca	1,522	22	5.205	2.010	26	292/km^{2} (757/sq mi)	2
197	San Juan Guelavía	3,288	13	31.76	12.26	18	104/km^{2} (268/sq mi)	9
219	San Juan Teitipac	2,688	16	41.27	15.93	15	65/km^{2} (169/sq mi)	13
284	San Miguel Tilquiapam	3,141	14	71.06	27.44	12	44/km^{2} (114/sq mi)	17
226	San Lorenzo Albarradas	2,971	15	134.4	51.9	9	22/km^{2} (57/sq mi)	21
233	San Lucas Quiaviní	1,720	21	51.77	19.99	13	33/km^{2} (86/sq mi)	19
298	San Pablo Villa de Mitla	13,587	2	280.4	108.3	6	48/km^{2} (125/sq mi)	16
325	San Pedro Quiatoni	11,930	3	564.1	217.8	1	21/km^{2} (55/sq mi)	22
333	San Pedro Totolapa	3,294	11	401.8	155.1	3	8/km^{2} (21/sq mi)	26
343	San Sebastián Teitipac	2,189	19	30.48	11.77	19	72/km^{2} (186/sq mi)	12
356	Santa Ana del Valle	2,179	20	27.88	10.76	20	78/km^{2} (202/sq mi)	11
380	Santa Cruz Papalutla	2,242	18	14.77	5.70	22	152/km^{2} (393/sq mi)	5
411	Santa María Guelacé	980	25	7.387	2.852	25	133/km^{2} (344/sq mi)	6
449	Santa María Zoquitlán	3,294	12	415.7	160.5	2	8/km^{2} (21/sq mi)	25
475	Santiago Matatlán	10,175	5	183.8	71.0	7	55/km^{2} (143/sq mi)	15
506	Santo Domingo Albarradas	798	26	43.58	16.83	14	18/km^{2} (47/sq mi)	24
546	Teotitlán del Valle	6,392	7	107.9	41.7	10	59/km^{2} (153/sq mi)	14
551	Tlacolula de Matamoros	30,254	1	135.7	52.4	8	223/km^{2} (577/sq mi)	3
560	Villa Díaz Ordaz	6,647	6	283.3	109.4	5	23/km^{2} (61/sq mi)	20
	Distrito Tlacolula	141,507	—	3,338	1,288.81	—	42/km^{2} (110/sq mi)	—
Source: INEGI

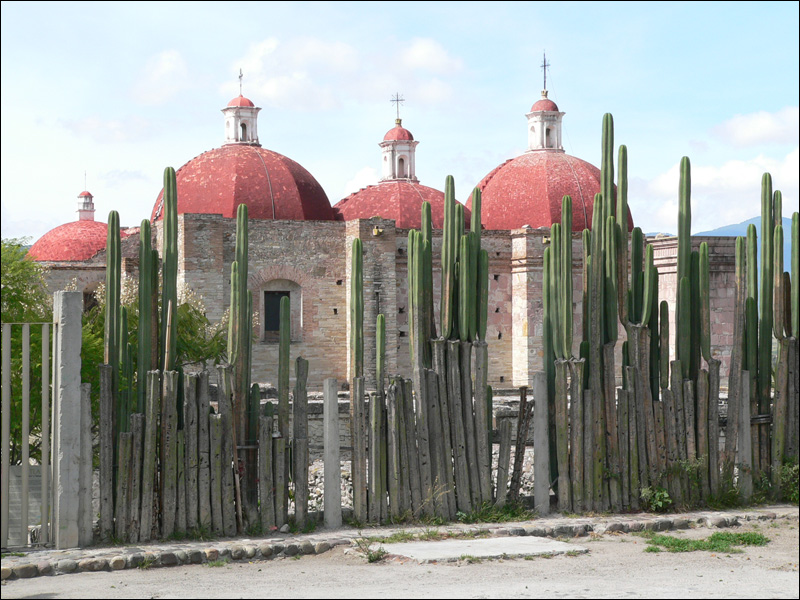
Church in San Pablo Villa de Mitla

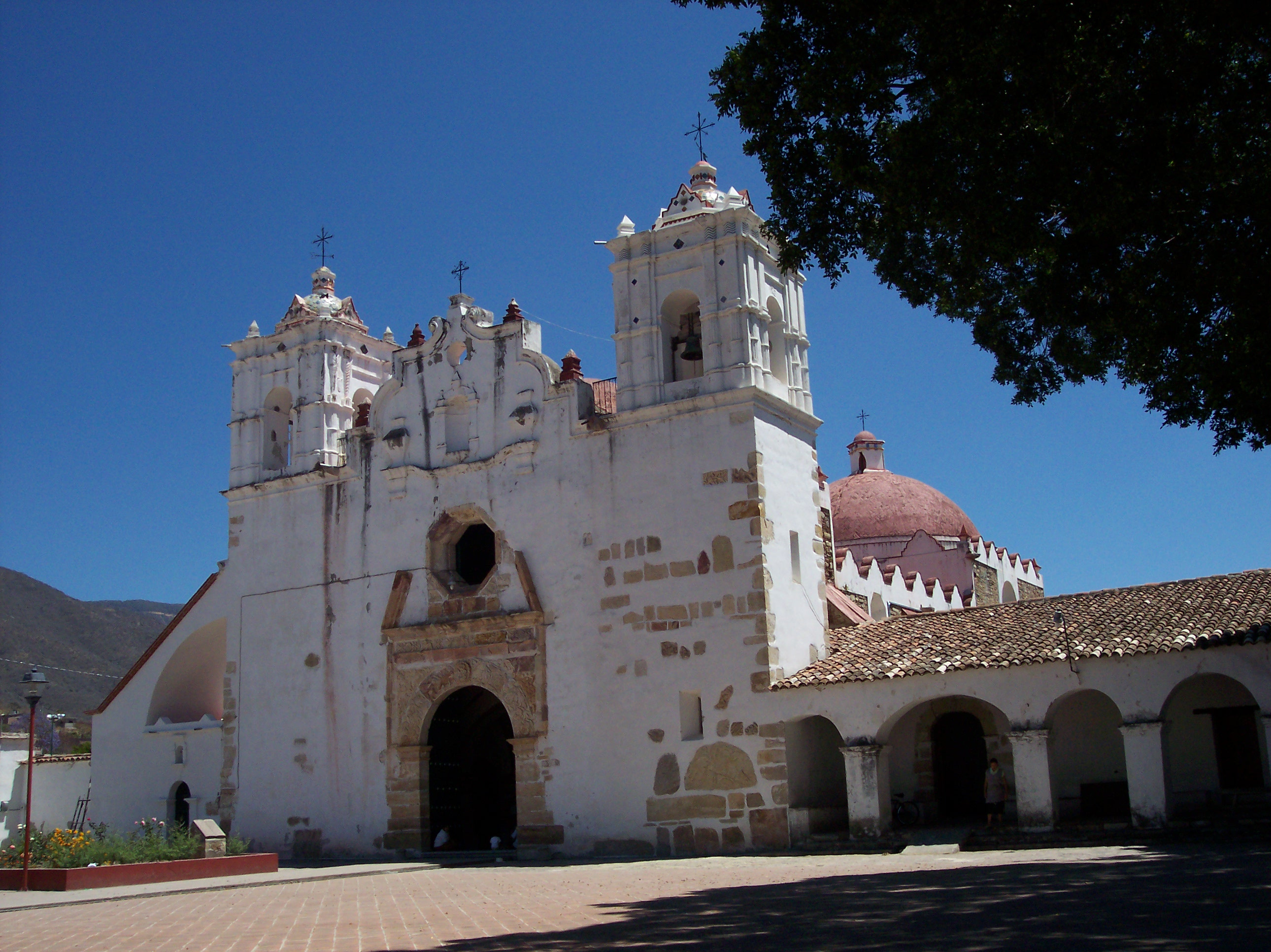
Preciosa Sangre de Cristo Church in Teotitlán del Valle

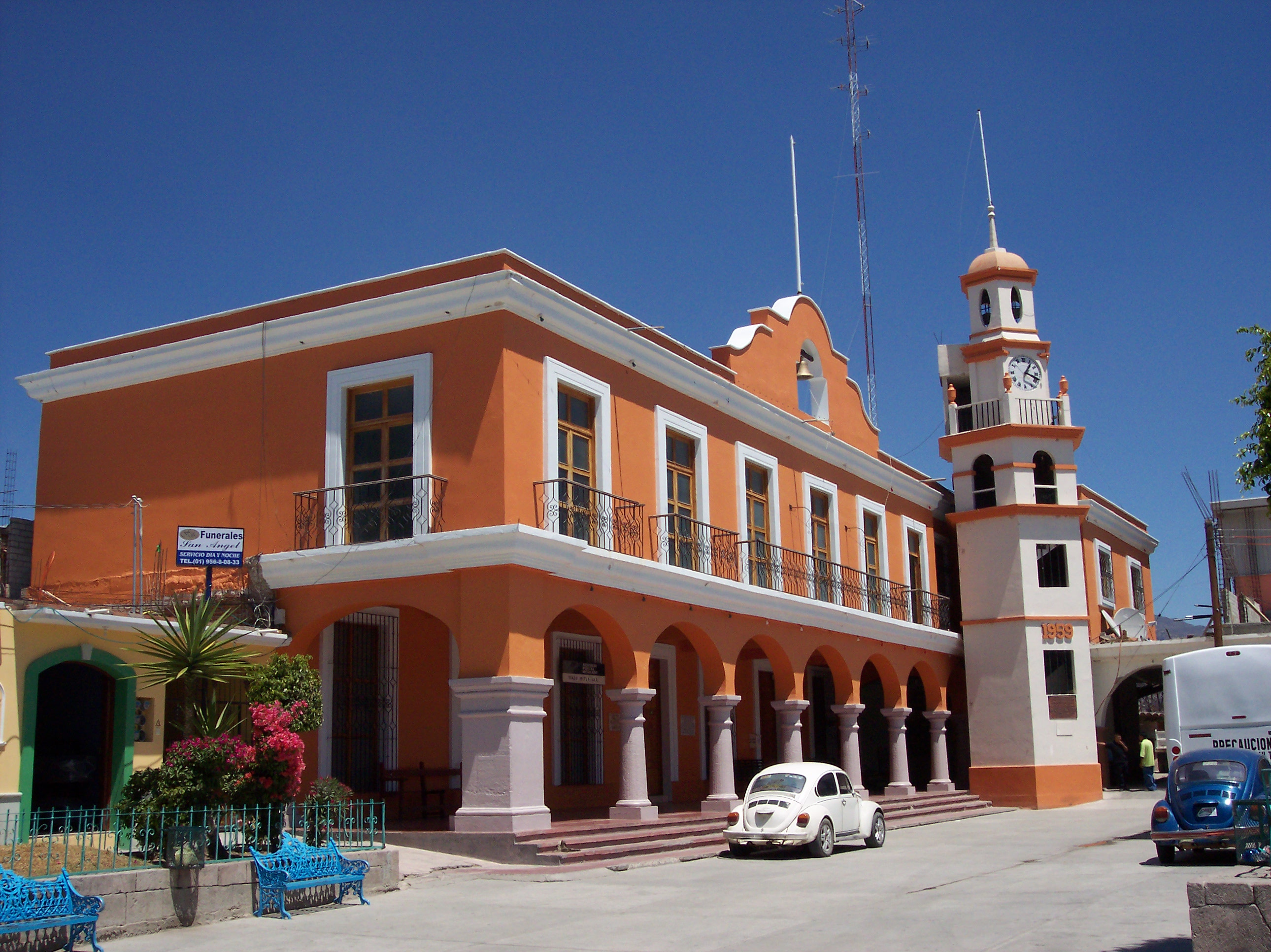
Municipal Palace at Mitla

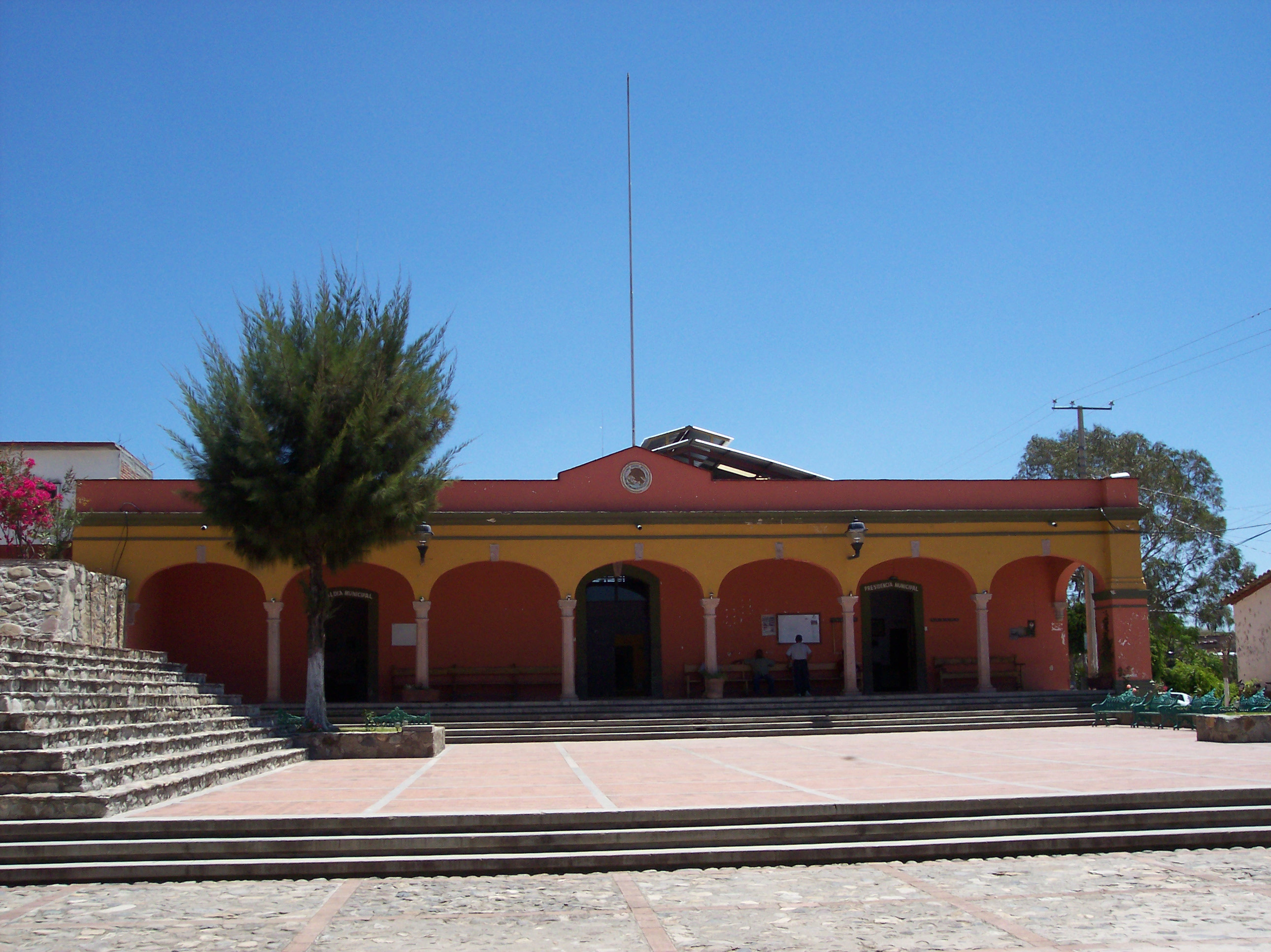
Municipal Palace in Teotitlán

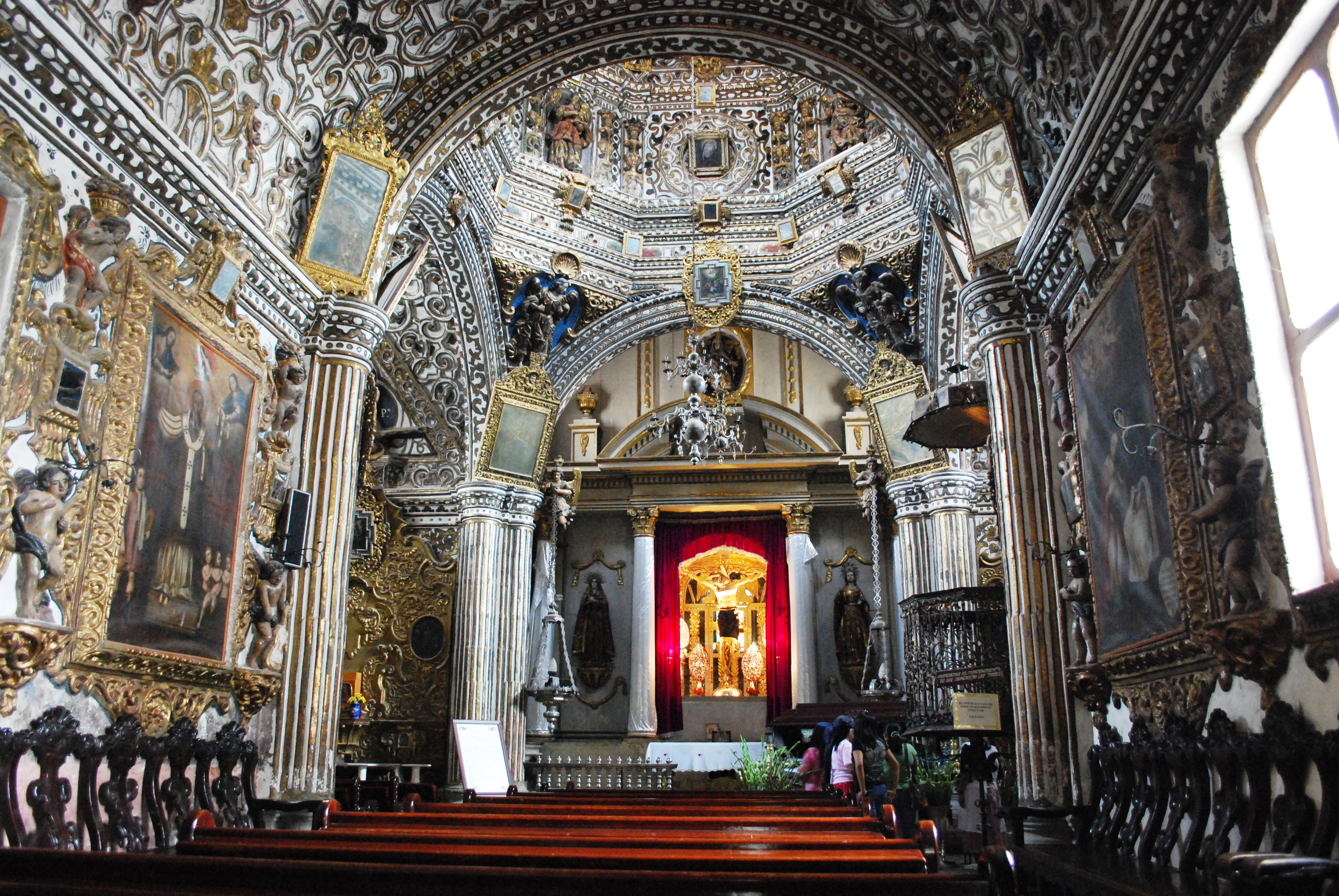
Altar area of the Capilla del Señor de Tlacolula

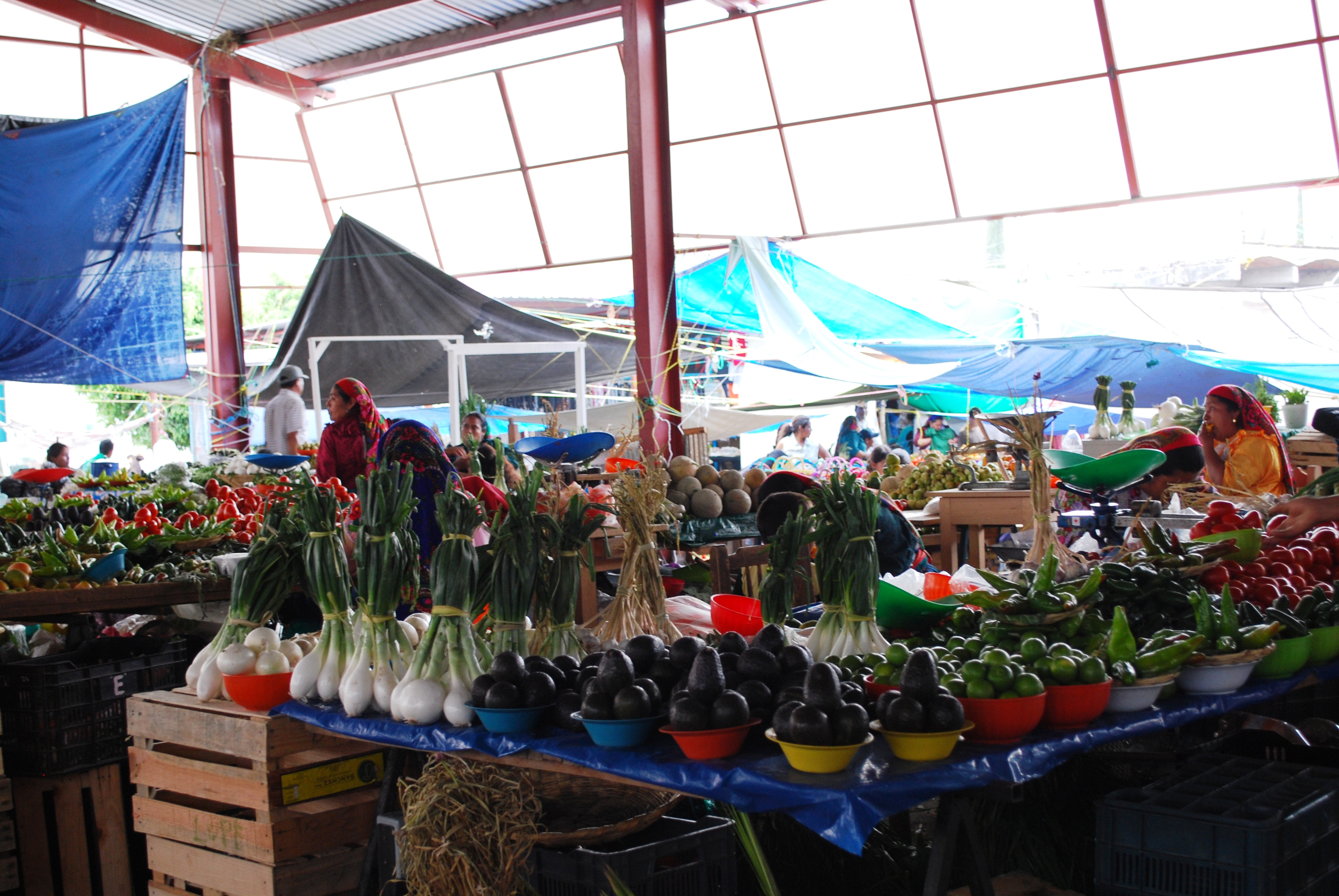
Fruits and vegetables at the municipal market, Tlacolula

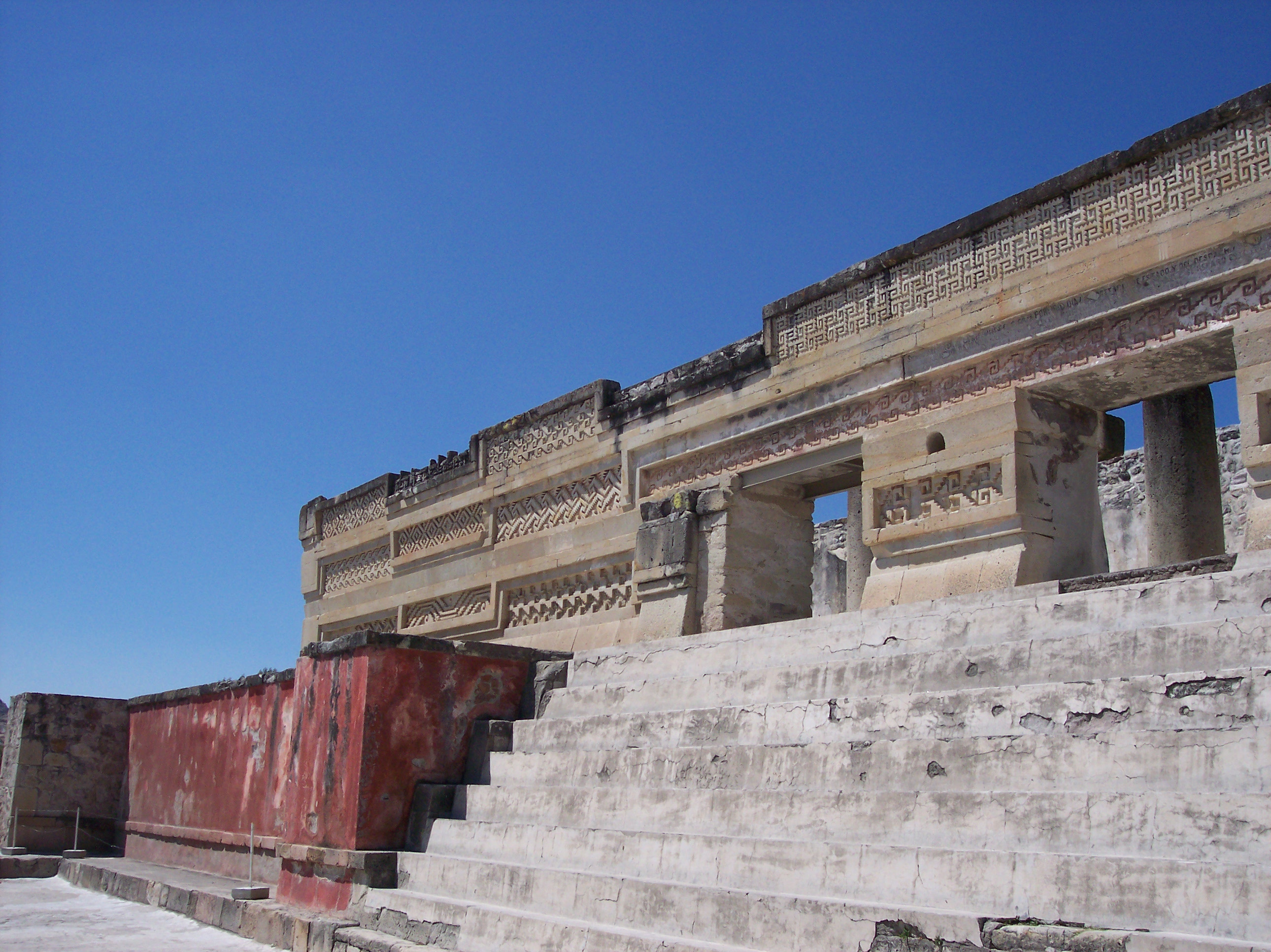
View of the Palace at the Mitla archaeological site

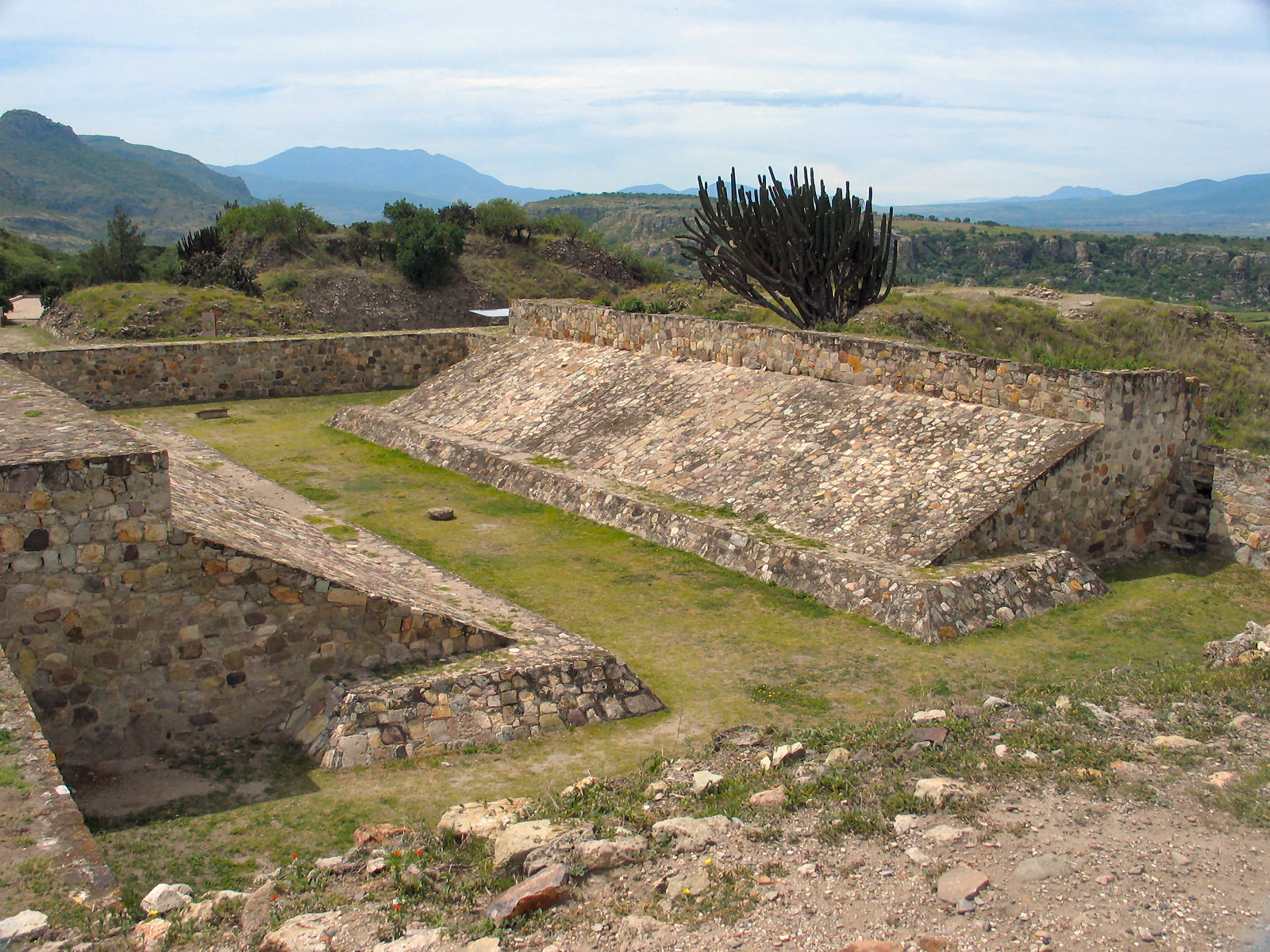
Ballcourt at Yagul archaeological site, Tlacolula de Matamoros

=== Largest cities ===
Largest cities or towns in Tlacolula Distric Source:
Rank		Municipality	Pop.
1	Tlacolula de Matamoros	Tlacolula de Matamoros	15,298
2	San Pablo Villa de Mitla	San Pablo Villa de Mitla	9,654
3	Fraccionamiento Ciudad Yagul	Tlacolula de Matamoros	6,492
4	San Dionisio Ocotepec	San Dionisio Ocotepec	5,960
5	San Francisco Lachigoló	San Francisco Lachigoló	5,091
6	Teotitlán del Valle	Teotitlán del Valle	4,858
7	Magdalena Teitipac	Magdalena Teitipac	4,644
8	San Pabo Guilá	Santiago Matatlán	4,435
9	San Pedro Quiatoni	San Pedro Quiatoni	3,954
10	San Baltazar Guelavila	San Dionisio Ocotepec	3,897
