= San Bartolomé Quialana =

- Municipality and town
- Location in Mexico
- Coordinates: 16°54′N 96°30′W
- Country: Mexico
- State: Oaxaca

Area
  - Total: 49.76 km^{2} (19.21 sq mi)

Population (2005)
  - Total: 2,485
- Time zone: UTC-6 (Central Standard Time)

San Bartolomé Quialana is a town and municipality in Oaxaca in south-western Mexico. The municipality covers an area of 49.76 km^{2}. It is part of the Tlacolula District in the east of the Valles Centrales Region.

As of 2005, the municipality had a total population of 2,485.

Women in the area wear traditional clothing.

== Language ==
Zapotec is an indigenous language spoken in the state of Oaxaca and it is a member of the Oto-Manguean language family. Instead of being a single, cohesive language, Zapotec is made up of numerous dialects, some of which are incomprehensible to one another. Dizhsa or Valley Zapotec is commonly spoken in San Bartolome Quialana alongside Spanish. Neighboring towns, such as San Lucas Quiavini, also speak Valley Zapotec but they are not the same. While they may sound similar, the accents and vocabulary differ from other Zapotec speakers or towns depending on where they are from.

3 examples of greetings and 1 response
Dizhsa(Valley Zapotec)	English	Pronunciation
Zac rsily!	Good morning!	za’c rsìii’lly!
Zac laizhi!	Good midday!	za’c laizhih!
Xa nuu?	How are you?	x:a nu’-ùu’?
Gwenag.	Fine.	gweenahg

Numbers 1-10 in Valley Zapotec
Dizhsa(Valley Zapotec)	English	Pronunciation
teiby	one	te'ihby
tyop	two	tyo'p
chon	three	chòonn
tap	four	tahp
gai	five	gài'
xop	six	x:òp
gaz	seven	gàaz
xon	eight	x:òon
ga	nine	gààa'
tsë	ten	tsêë'

== Etymology ==
Quialana is a Zapotec word that means "black rocks" or "blackened rocks." This is associated with the fact that there is a rocky hill in the area which is called Picacho or Yubda (in Zapotec, "Sun Rock).

== Traditional clothing ==
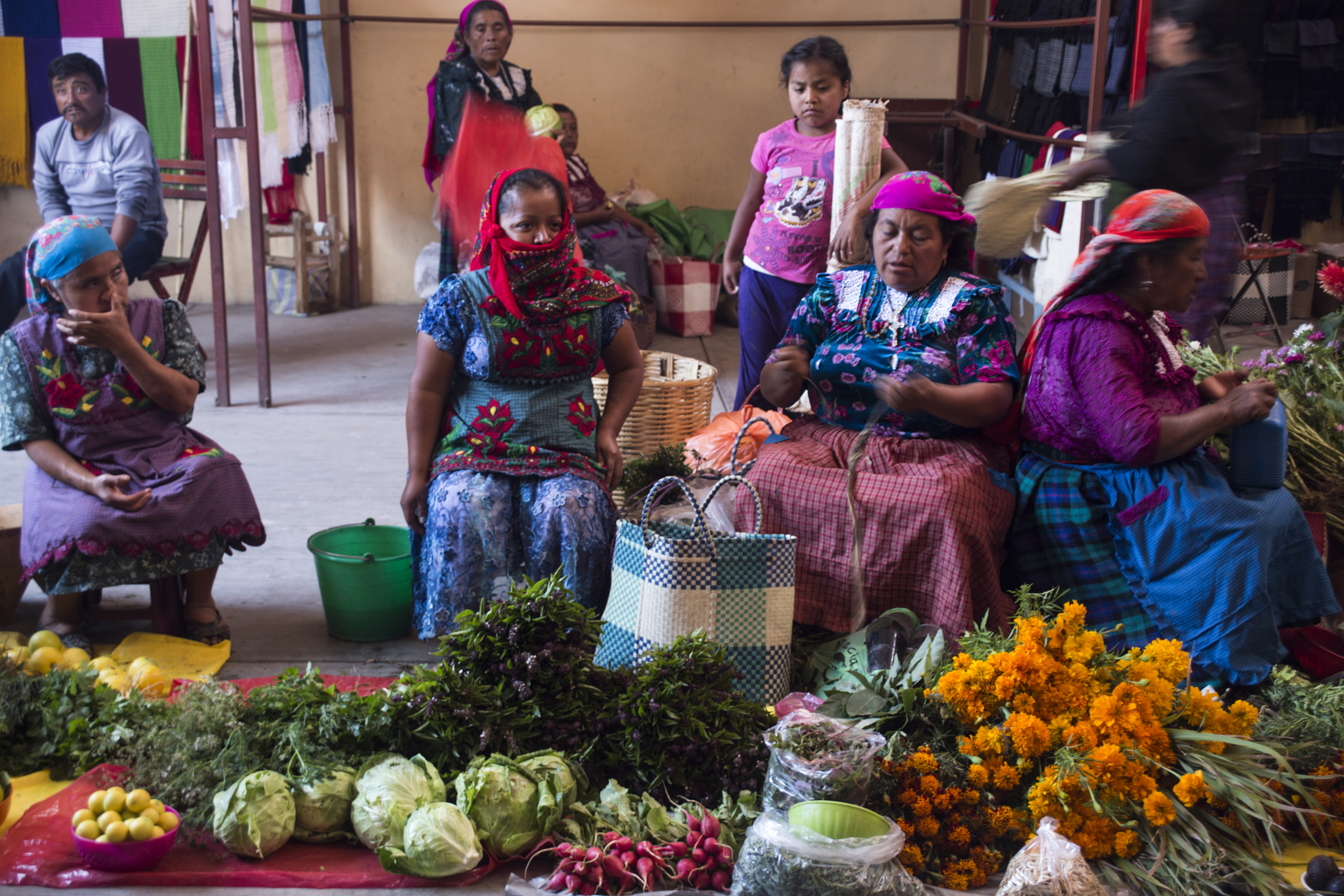
Women from San Bartolome Quialana in traditional attire, selling in the market of Tlacolula, Oaxaca

The women of San Bartolome Quialana have two traditional ways of dressing. The first one is a more traditional attire, but both are worn day to day. The top half consists of a floral embroidered blouse underneath a floral blouse that is tied in the back. The bottom half consists of a skirt worn underneath a plaid wrap skirt that is held up by a handwoven belt which is tightly wrapped around the waist to prevent the wrap skirt from slipping off. Then it is topped off with a small apron that is tied around the waist over the skirt to prevent the wrap skirt from getting dirty.

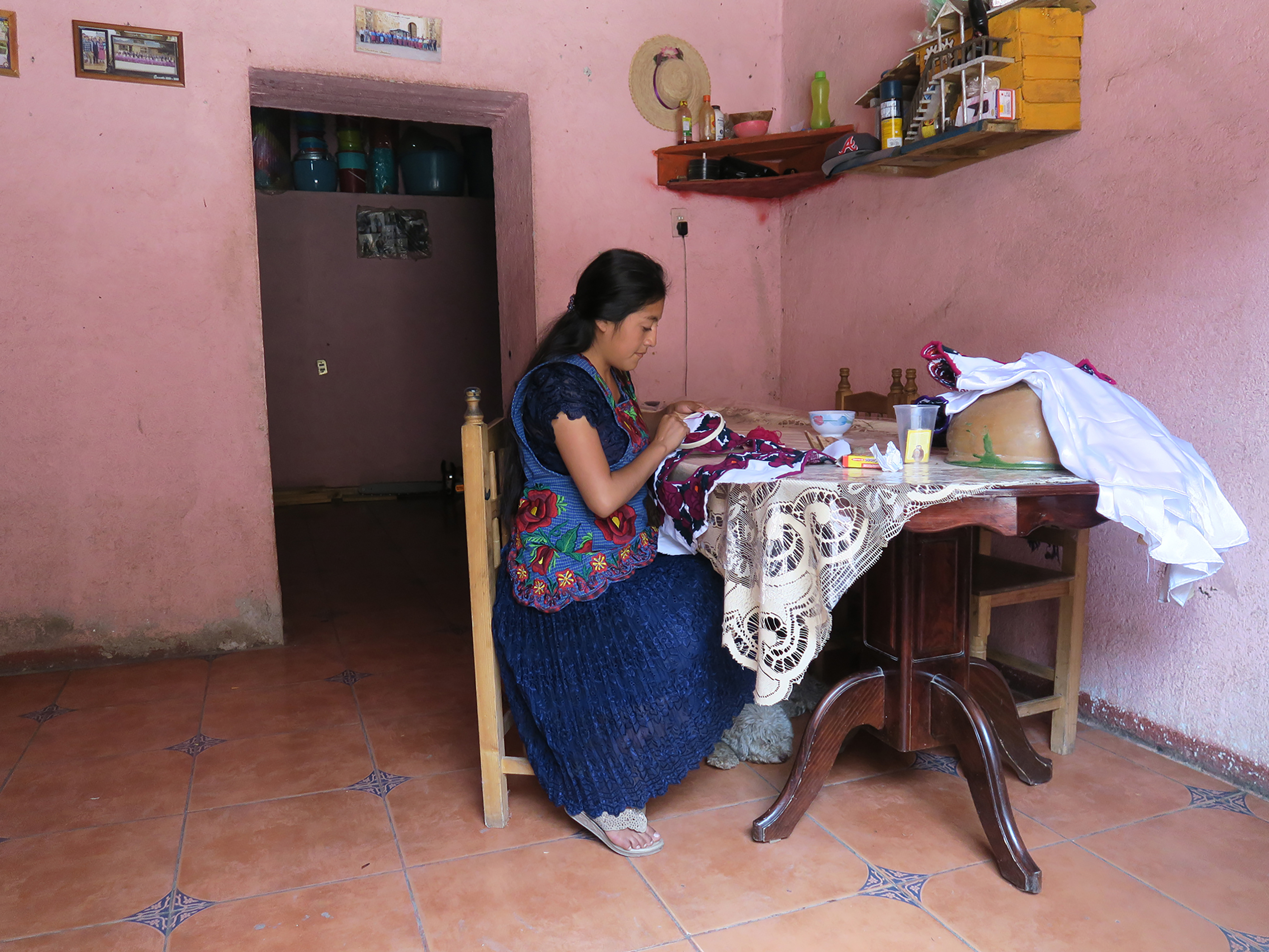
Young woman in her traditional attire embroidering a blouse. Photo taken by Amalia Fotógrafa

The second one is simpler. A skirt and plain undershirt worn underneath a floral dress topped off with a beautifully embroidered apron.
