= San Juan Teitipac =

- Municipality and town
- Location in Mexico
- Coordinates: 16°56′N 96°36′W
- Country: Mexico
- State: Oaxaca

Area
  - Total: 11.48 km^{2} (4.43 sq mi)

Population (2005)
  - Total: 2,552
- Time zone: UTC-6 (Central Standard Time)

San Juan Teitipac is a town and municipality in Oaxaca in south-western Mexico. The municipality covers an area of 11.48 km^{2}. It is part of the Tlacolula District in the east of the Valles Centrales Region.

As of 2005, the municipality had a total population of 2,552.

== Culture ==
The town's 16th-century church is notable for a number of colonial-era santos (statues of the saints), some of them in the refined Spanish tradition and others of intriguing folk design.

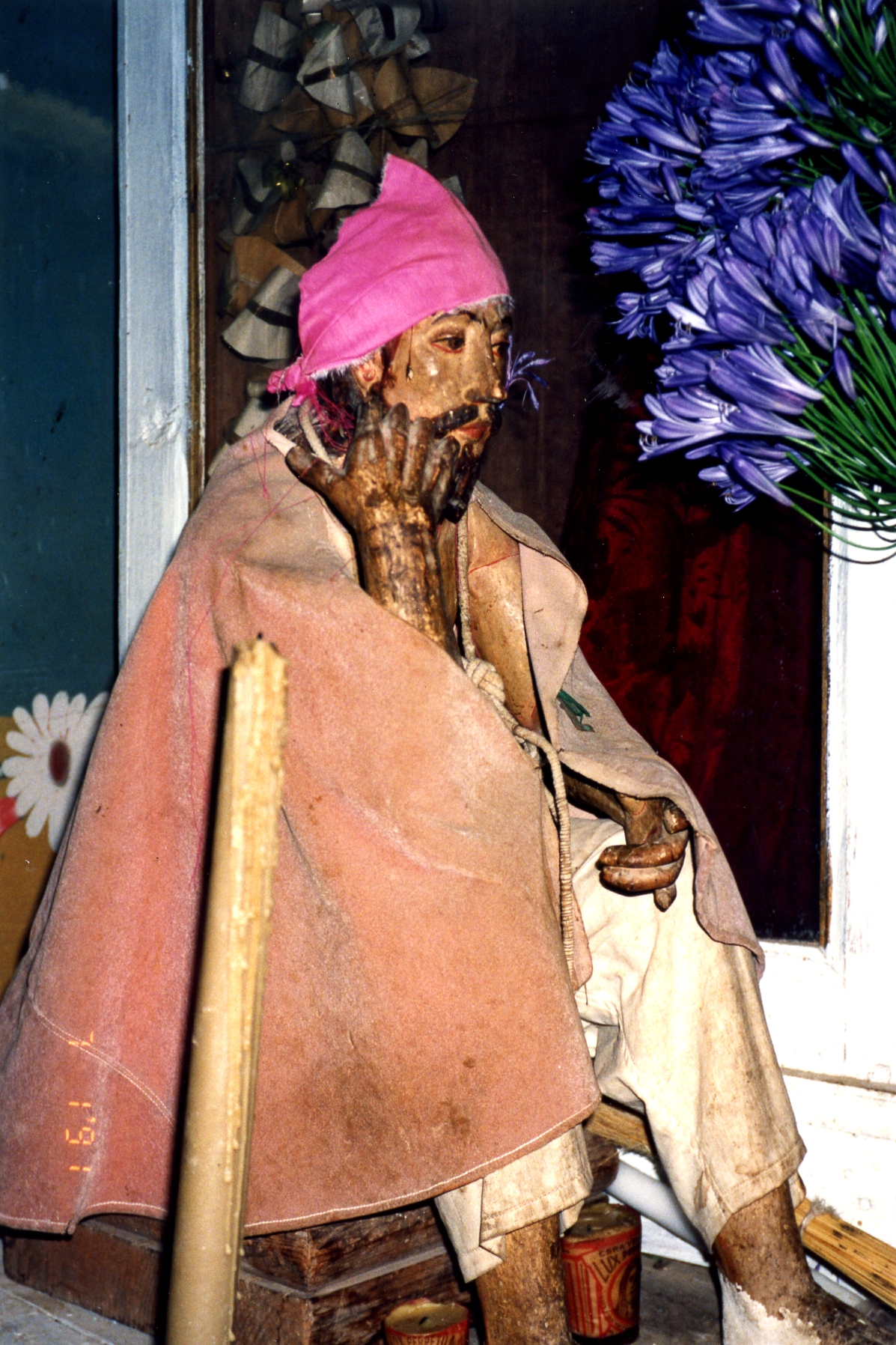
San Paciencia portrays Jesus after his torments in the praetorium.

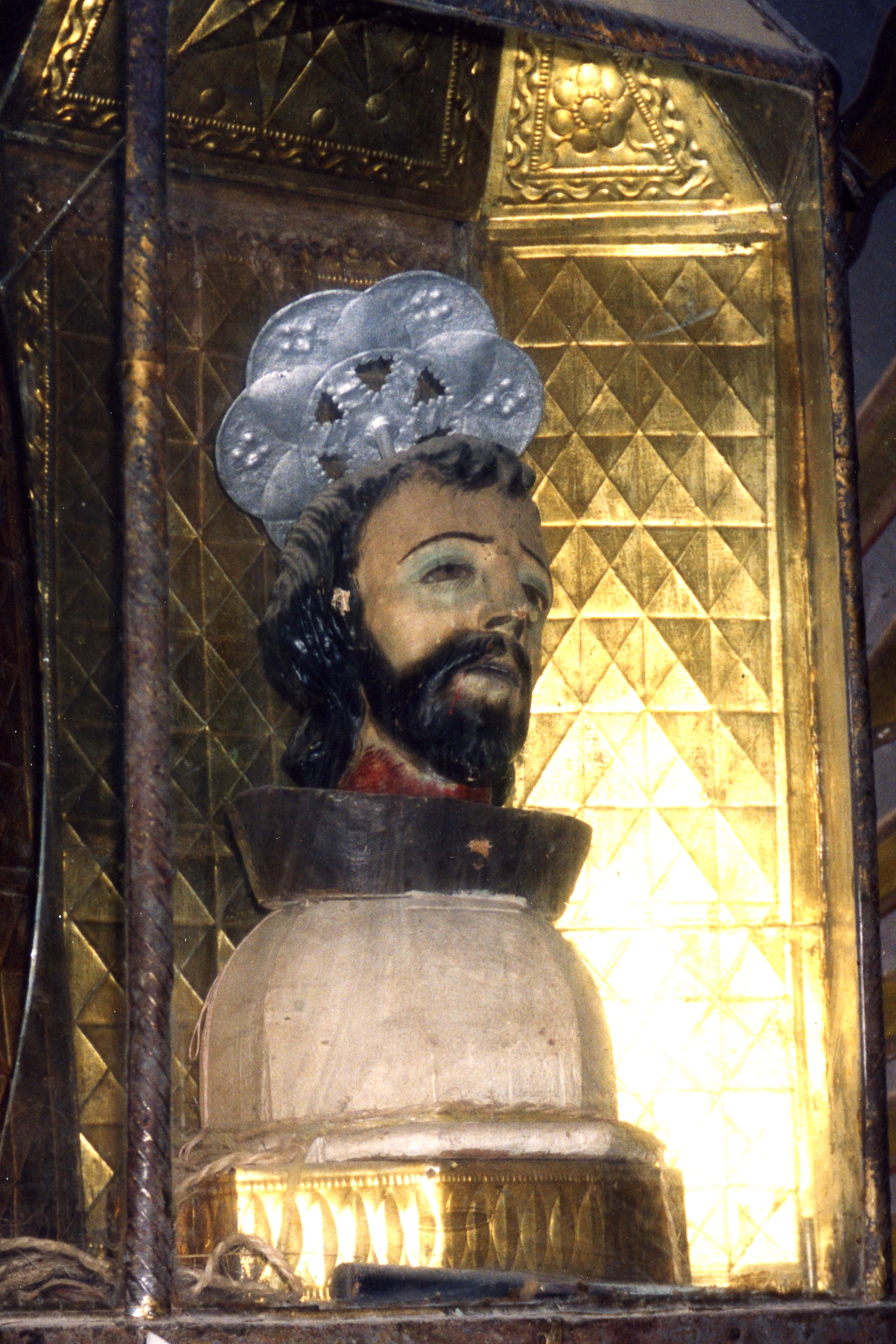
The Beheading of St. John the Baptist

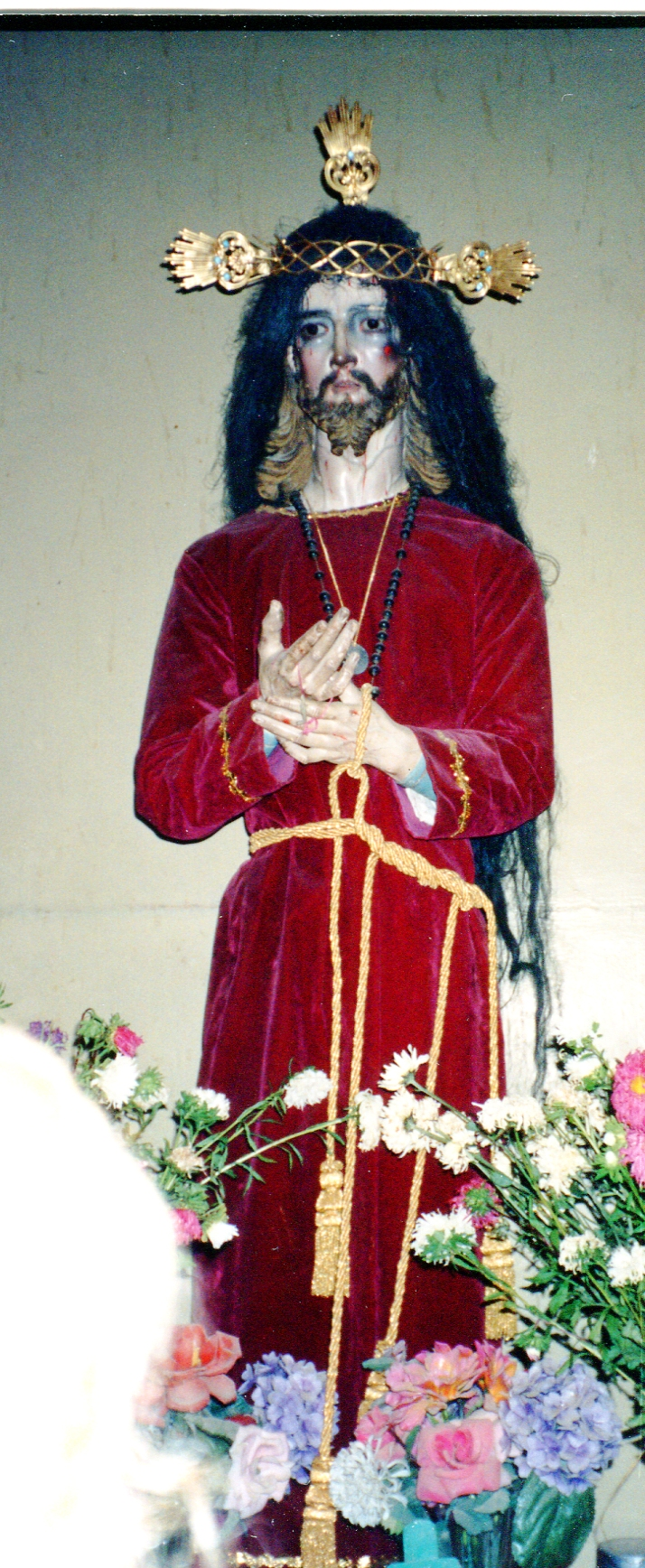
An Ecce Homo santo
