= San Sebastián Teitipac =

- Municipality and town
- Location in Mexico
- Coordinates: 16°57′N 96°37′W
- Country: Mexico
- State: Oaxaca
- Time zone: UTC-6 (Central Standard Time)

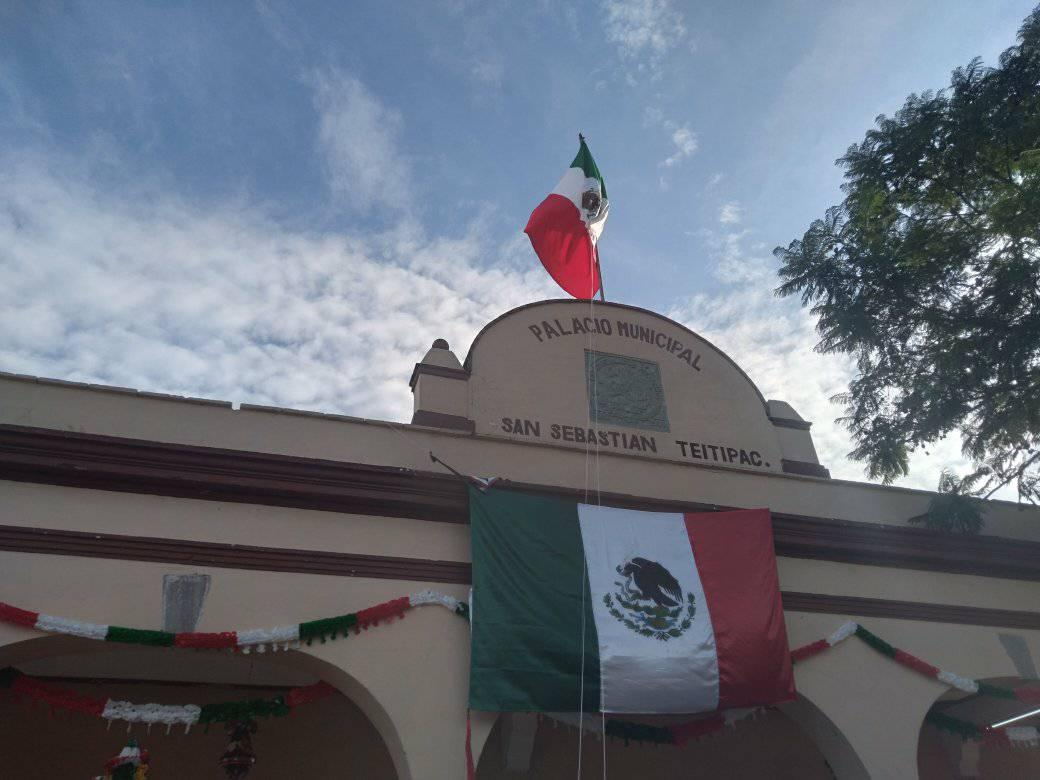
San Sebastián Teitipac

San Sebastián Teitipac is a town and municipality in Oaxaca in south-western Mexico. The municipality covers an area of km^{2}. It is part of the Tlacolula District in the east of the Valles Centrales Region.

As of 2005, the municipality had a total population of .

== History ==
There was at least one prehispanic settlement in this region called Teticpac. Today there are three towns called Teitipac located in the same region, but it is not necessarily clear which one, if any, corresponds most closely to the location of the "Teitipac" mentioned in historic accounts. At any rate, Teticpac was a prehispanic Zapotec settlement. Religious activities comprised the sacrifice of children, slaves and dogs to idols, accompanied by dancing and the ingestion of psilocybin mushrooms. Teticpac was subject to Zaachila, and rendered tribute of turkeys, rabbits and honey.
