= Santo Domingo Albarradas =

Coordinates: 17°4′0.12″N 96°12′0″W

- Municipality and town
- Interactive map of Santo Domingo Albarradas
- Country: Mexico
- State: Oaxaca

Population (2010)
  - Total: 782
- Time zone: UTC-6 (Central Standard Time)

Santo Domingo Albarradas is a town and municipality in Oaxaca in south-western Mexico. The municipality covers an area of 90.08 km^{2}. It is part of the Tlacolula District in the east of the Valles Centrales Region.

As of 2010, the municipality had a total population of 782.
