= Santiago Matatlán =

- Municipality and town
- Flag
- Nickname: World Capital Of Mezcal
- Location in Mexico Santiago Matatlán (Oaxaca)
- Coordinates: 16°52′N 96°23′W
- Country: Mexico
- State: Oaxaca
- Time zone: UTC-6 (Central Standard Time)

Santiago Matatlán a.k.a. "World Capital Of Mezcal" is a town and municipality in Oaxaca in south-western Mexico. The municipality covers an area of 85.48 km^{2}.

It is part of the Tlacolula District in the east of the Valles Centrales Region.
