= Santa Ana del Valle =

- Municipality and town
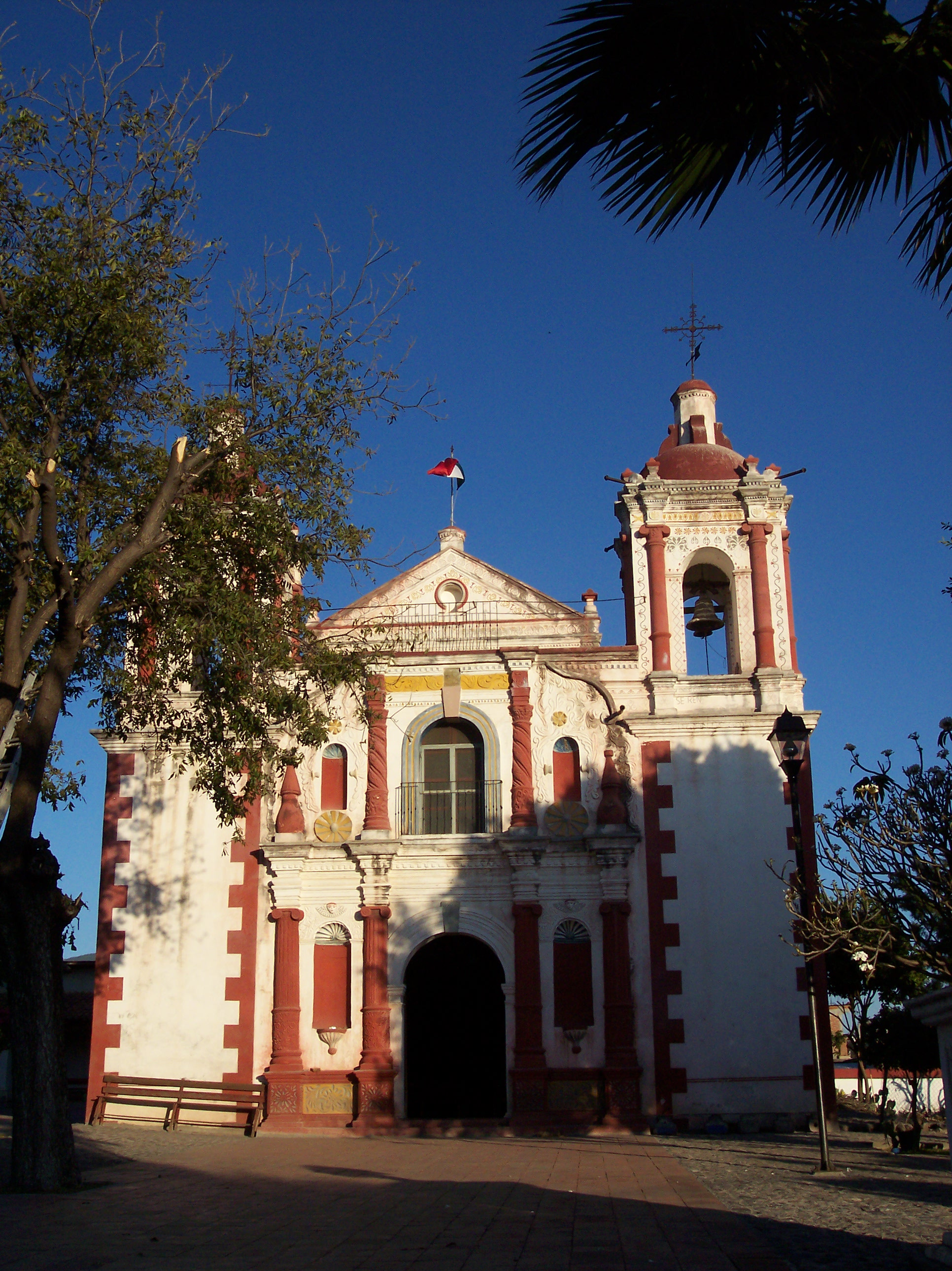
- The church of Saint Anne in Santa Ana del Valle

- Location in Mexico
- Coordinates: 16°59′35″N 96°28′17″W
- Country: Mexico
- State: Oaxaca
- Time zone: UTC-6 (Central Standard Time)

Santa Ana del Valle is a town and municipality in Oaxaca in south-western Mexico. The municipality covers an area of km^{2}. It is part of the Tlacolula District in the east of the Valles Centrales Region.

As of 2005, the municipality had a total population of 1,996.

The town's church is notable for its large number of fine colonial-era santos (statues of saints), many executed in polychrome and well preserved to this day.
