= San Juan Guelavía =

- Municipality and town
- Location in Mexico
- Coordinates: 16°57′N 96°32′W
- Country: Mexico
- State: Oaxaca

Area
  - Total: 17.86 km^{2} (6.90 sq mi)

Population (2005)
  - Total: 2,940
- Time zone: UTC-6 (Central Standard Time)

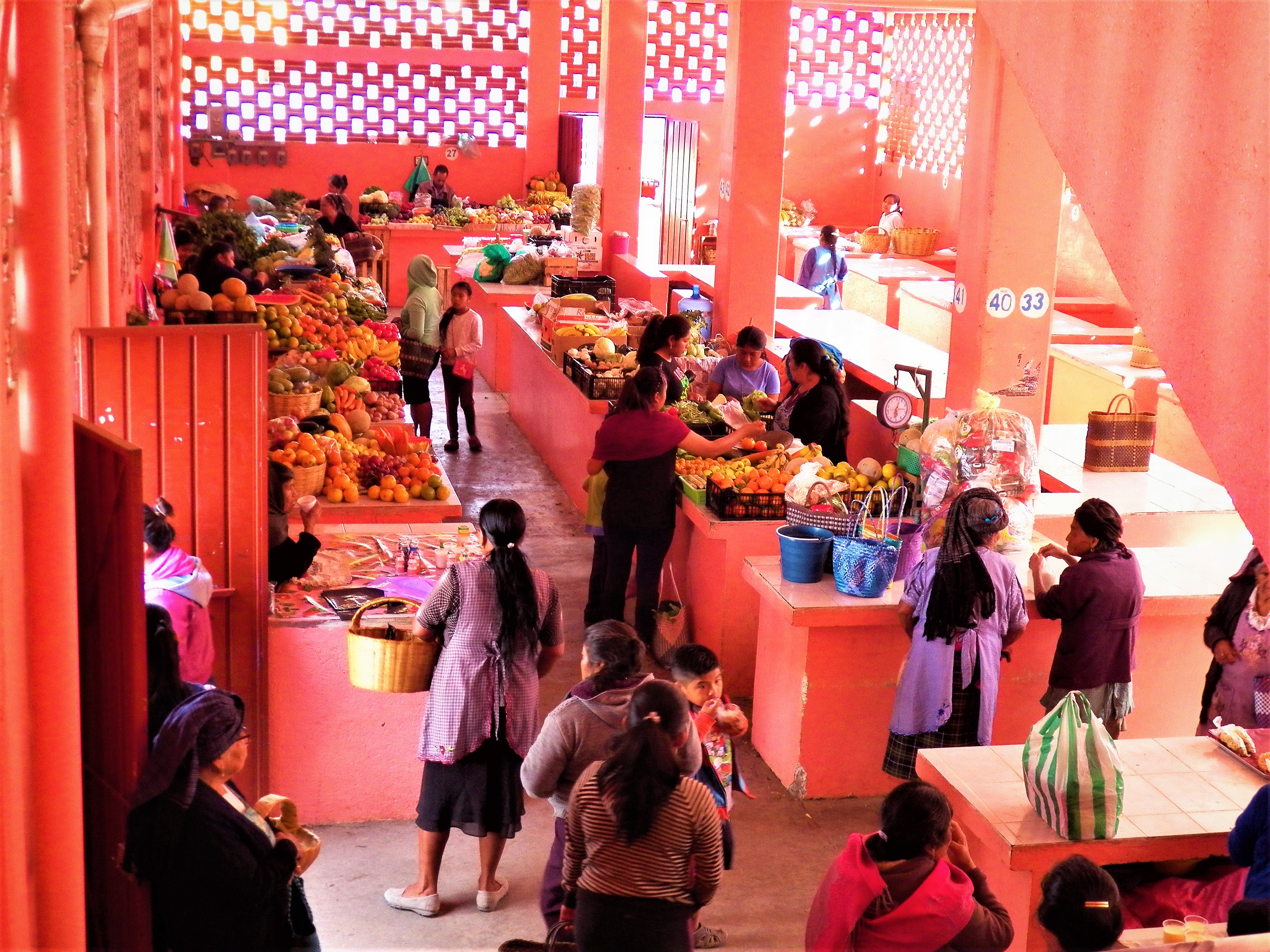
Market in San Juan Guelavía

San Juan Guelavía is a town and municipality in Oaxaca in south-western Mexico. The municipality covers an area of 17.86 km^{2}. It is part of the Tlacolula District in the east of the Valles Centrales Region.

As of 2005, the municipality had a total population of 2,940.

== Geography ==
San Juan Guelavia is on the river and one of the few communities in the valley that had historically set up irrigation canals.

== History ==
Early Spanish migration to the area consisted of cattle ranchers who moved their cattle from communal usage pastures in the mountains to communal pastures in the valley. In 1539, Bartolome Sanchez was granted an estancia de granado mayor (permanent land holding rights) near what is now San Juan Guelavía.

Guelavia's sixteenth century church has a large number of colonial-era santos, statues of Roman Catholic saints.

During the Mexican Revolution, in 1914, General Juan M. Brito stationed his troops near San Juan Guelavia to oppose the Federalist aims of Venustiano Carranza. After the war, Brito spent time in a prison in the Federal District of Mexico City before returning to San Juan Guelavia, where he established himself as a businessman running a store and also the local jefe strong man controlling the local communities through force of his armed followers.
