= San Lorenzo Albarradas =

- Municipality and town
- Location in Mexico
- Coordinates: 16°54′N 96°15′W
- Country: Mexico
- State: Oaxaca

Area
  - Total: 61.24 km^{2} (23.64 sq mi)

Population (2005)
  - Total: 2,477
- Time zone: UTC-6 (Central Standard Time)

San Lorenzo Albarradas is a town and municipality in Oaxaca in south-western Mexico. The municipality covers an area of 61.24 km^{2}. It is part of the Tlacolula District in the east of the Valles Centrales Region.

As of 2005, the municipality had a total population of 2,477.

Hierve el Agua is located in the municipality. The municipality is also home to the archaeological site of San Lorenzo Albarradas (sometimes referred to as Cerro Guiran) which is noted for its unfinished cross-shaped tombs.
