= Villa Díaz Ordaz =

- Municipality and town
- Location in Mexico
- Coordinates: 16°58′N 96°27′W
- Country: Mexico
- State: Oaxaca
- Time zone: UTC-6 (Central Standard Time)

Villa Díaz Ordaz is a town and municipality in Oaxaca in south-western Mexico. The municipality covers an area of km^{2}. It is part of the Tlacolula District in the east of the Valles Centrales Region.The name of the town was formally called Santo Domingo del Valle.

As of 2005, the municipality had a total population of 5,859.

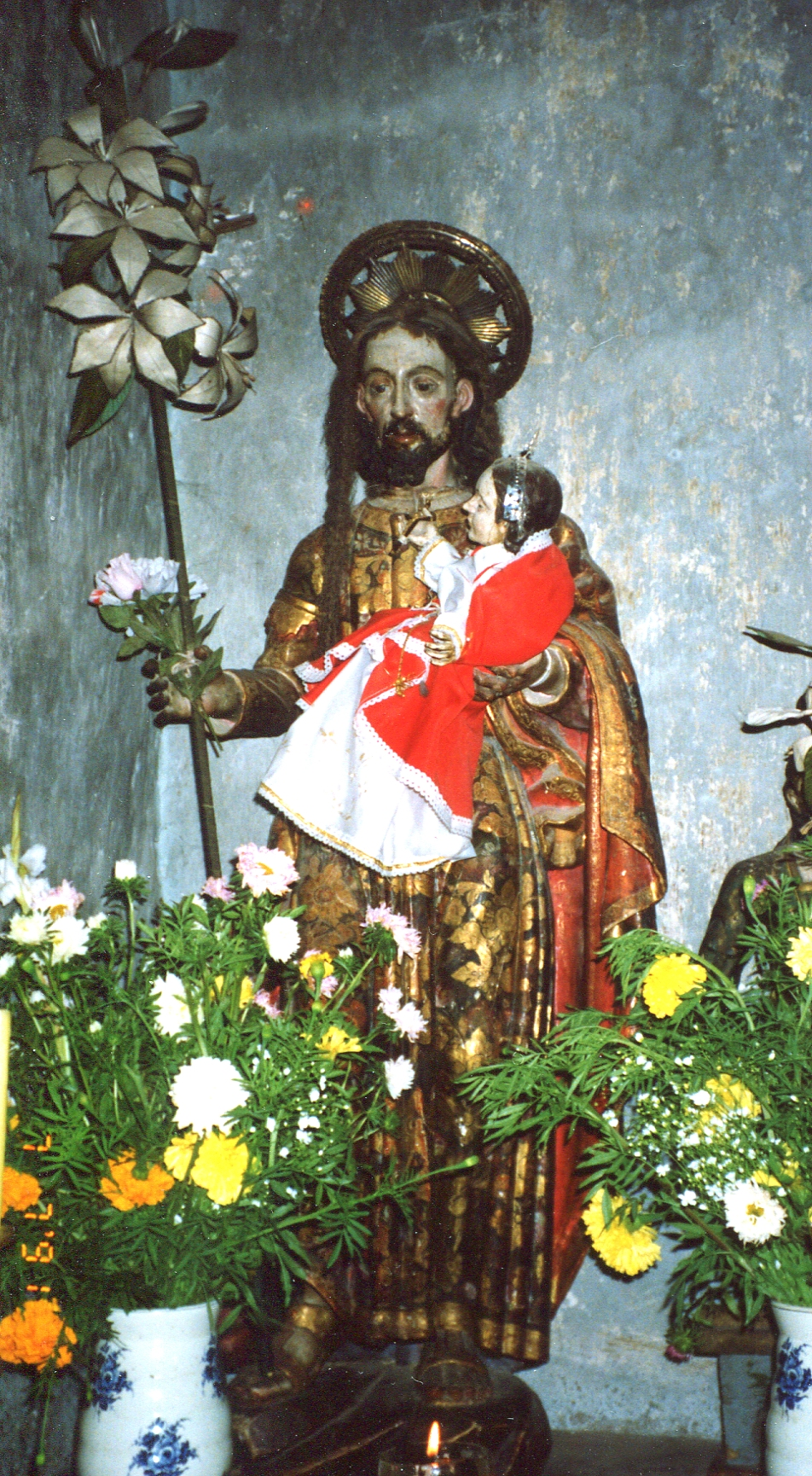
OrdazJose

The community's church, Santo Domingo Díaz Ordaz, was built in 1526 and is noted for a number of santos, traditional statues of Roman Catholic saints. Some can be dated to the sixteenth century but are still preserved and in use by local citizens, who provide them with flowers and sometimes even with modern dolls as adjuncts, as in the image on the left.
