= Tlaxiaco =

Tlaxiaco, Oaxaca
- City
- Heroica Ciudad de Tlaxiaco
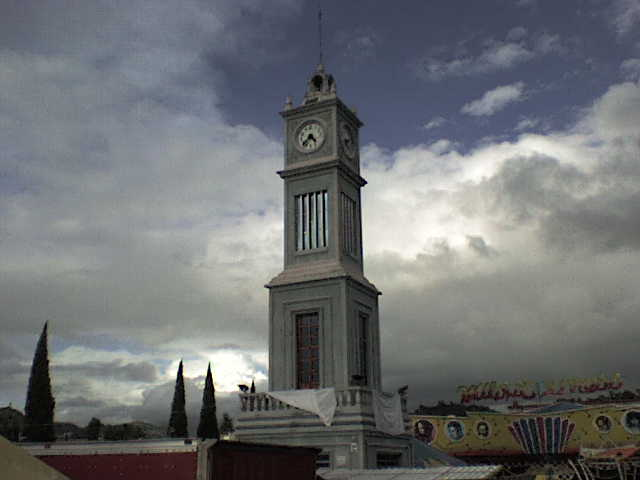
- Monumental clock in Tlaxiaco

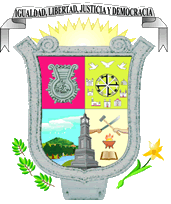
- Coat of arms

- Location within Oaxaca Location within Mexico
- Coordinates: 17°16′N 97°41′W
- Country: Mexico
- State: Oaxaca
- Founded: ca. 400 BC
- Town status: 1 October 1852
- City status: 7 October 1884

Area (municipality)
  - Municipality: 343.2 km^{2} (132.5 sq mi)
- Elevation: 2,040 m (6,690 ft)

Population (2020)
  - Municipality: 40,123
- Time zone: UTC-6 (Central (US Central))
- Postal code: 69800
- Area code: 953
- Fiestas: 14–21 October
- Demonym: Tlaxiaqueño
- Website: http://www.tlaxiaco.gob.mx/

Tlaxiaco (Spanish pronunciation: [tlaˈxja.ko]) is a city, and its surrounding municipality of the same name, in the Mexican state of Oaxaca. It is located in the Tlaxiaco District in the south of the Mixteca Region, with a population of about 17,450.

The city is formally known as Heroica Ciudad de Tlaxiaco ("heroic city of Tlaxiaco") in honour of a battle waged there during the 1862–67 French invasion. Tlaxiaco [t͡ɬa.ˈʃia.ko] is a Nahuatl name containing the elements tlachtli [t͡ɬˈat͡ʃt͡ɬi] (ball game), quiahuitl [kiˈawit͡ɬ] (rain), and -co [ko] (place marker). It thus approximates to "Place where it rains on the ball court". Its name in the Mixtec language is Ndijiinu, which means "good view".

== History ==
Before Spanish colonization, Tlaxiaco was a notable city-state of the Mixtec culture with at least 31 subject towns, and its ruler may have been linked to nearby Tilantongo. The town had a large market, and local products included cochineal, wood, and cotton cloth. The town was conquered by the Aztec Empire under Moctezuma II in either 1511 or 1512. Thereafter, it became the capital of a tributary province which also included San Miguel Tlacotepec, San Juan Mixtepec, and San Miguel Achiutla. Tlaxiaco paid tribute in the form of one warrior costume and shield, gold dust, cochineal, and quetzal feathers. The last may have been acquired by trade from Miahuatlán or Tututepec. Tlaxiaco fought wars against Mitlatongo and Tututepec.

== The city ==
The city of Tlaxiaco stands at 17°16’N, 97°41’W, at 2040 metres above sea level, some 100 kilometres to the northwest of state capital Oaxaca de Juárez. To the north the municipality borders with Santiago Nundiche; to the south with San Antonio Sinicahua, San Miguel El Grande, San Esteban Atatlahuca, Santa Cruz Nundaco, Santo Tomás Ocotepec, and Putla Villa de Guerrero; to the east with Santa María del Rosario, Santa Catarina Tayata, San Cristobal Amoltepec, and Magdalena Peñasco; and to the west with San Juan Mixtepec. The municipality covers a total surface area of 343.2 km^{2}.

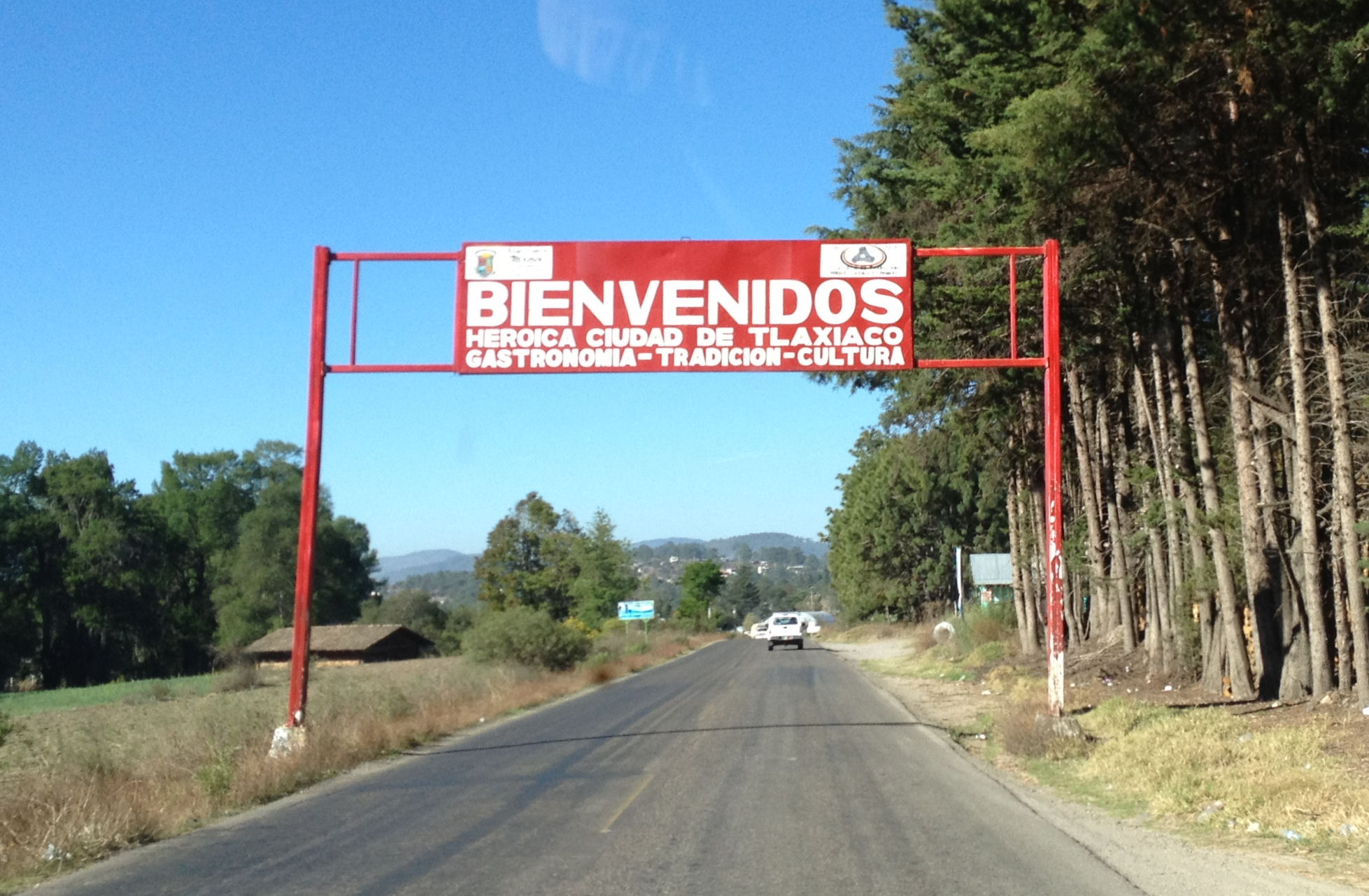
Entrance to the city

Tlaxiaco is located in temperate valley, surrounded by two mountains belonging to the Sierra Mixteca: Cerro Negro and Cerro Yucuninu, the latter of which is the highest point in the municipality at 2875 metres above sea level. Like most of the Mixteca region, the Tlaxiaco valley is drained by the Río Balsas system, which is fed by numerous small streams that rise in the hills near the municipal seat.

The climate is subhumid temperate, with a rainy reason in the summer. The average annual temperature is 18°C, although in winter temperatures can drop to zero or below. Unlike other areas in the Mixteca region, the Tlaxiaco valley and its surrounding mountains still possess some conifer forests, inhabited by species including deer, armadillos, rabbits, and other small mammals.

XETLA, a government-run indigenous community radio station, is based in Tlaxiaco.

The city's Santa María Asunción church is notable for a number of colonial-era santos (statues of saints).

=== Notable Tlaxiaqueños ===
- Yalitza Aparicio - Actress and Teacher
- Lila Downs - Singer
- Patricia Reyes Spindola - Actress
- Rafael Reyes Spindola - Journalist

== The municipality ==
As municipal seat, Tlaxiaco has governing jurisdiction over the following communities:

Agua Zarca, Arboleda, Atayiki, Barranca Obscura, Barrio San Miguel, Barrio San Nicolás, Benito Juárez Cuquila, Cañada Alejandro, Cañada Candelaria, Cañada del Curtidor, Cañada María (Primera Sección), Cañada María (Segunda Sección), Cabayoco, Campo de Aviación, Capilla del Carrizal, Cerrito de la Virgen, Cerro Negro, Colonia Adolfo López Mateos, Cruz Llorada, Ejido Cañada Santa María, Ejido Ojo de Agua (El Vergelito), El Apartadero, El Boquerón, El Capulín 1, El Capulín 2, El Crucero, El Mogote, El Ojite, El Sabino, El Terrero (Venustiano Carranza), El Vergel, Guadalupe Hidalgo, Ignacio Manuel Altamirano, Joya Grande, Juan Escutia Cuquila, Kilómetro Doce, La Angostura, La Barranca del Tabaco, La Corona, La Cruz Verde, La Desviación (Tierra Colorada), La Lobera 1, La Lobera 2, La Peña Negra, La Providencia, La Purísima Concepción, La Séptima Poniente, La Unión, Las Huertas, Linda Vista 1, Linda Vista 2, Llano Castro, Llano de Guadalupe, Llano de Plaza, Llano del Guajolote (Los Sánchez), Loma Aplastado, Loma del Venado, Loma Saayii, Loma Snuviji, Los Ángeles, Los Blancos, Los Cortés, Mexicalcingo de los Granados, Mogote de San Cristóbal, Nuñuma, Nueva Reforma, Ojo de Agua 1, Ojo de Agua 2, Palo de Letra, Plan de Guadalupe, Ranchería Santos, Rancho Viejo, Rancho Viejo (Eskandaba), Rancho Yosondua, Río de Arena, Río de los Pinos, Río de Ocotepec (Yutecuiñi), Río Delgado, San Agustín Tlacotepec, San Bartolo, San Diego, San Felipe Tindaco, San Isidro, San Isidro Mirasol, San Juan de las Flores, San Miguel Progreso, San Pedro, San Pedro Llano Grande, −SAN PEDRO YOSOTATU—, San Sebastián, Santa Lucrecia, Santa María Cuquila, Santo Domingo Huendío, Snite, Tierra Azul, Tierra Blanca (San Nicolás), Tierra Colorada, Yosobee, Yosocahanu, Yososana, Yosostato, Yosostuvi, Yosotica, Yosotium, Yucahua, Yucuhillo, Yucutu, Yutendoo, and Yutenino Segunda Sección.

The municipality reported a population of 34,587 in the 2005 Census, of whom 9,399 spoke an indigenous language (predominantly Mixtecan and Triqui).

The land is essentially used for habitation and small-scale agriculture, which represents the main economic activity of the municipality's inhabitants.
