= Santa Catarina =

Santa Catarina (Portuguese for Catherine of Alexandria) may refer to:

== Places ==
=== Brazil ===
- Santa Catarina (state), one of Brazil's federal states
- Santa Catarina Island, located in Santa Catarina state
- Santa Catarina Hospital, located in the city of São Paulo

=== Cape Verde ===
- Santa Catarina, Cape Verde, a municipality

=== Curaçao ===
- Santa Catarina, Curaçao, a small town (also spelled Santa Catharina)

=== Guatemala ===
- Santa Catarina Barahona, a town in Sacatepéquez Department
- Santa Catarina Ixtahuacan, a town in Sololá Department
- Santa Catarina Mita, a town in Jutiapa Department
- Santa Catarina Palopó, a town in Sololá Department

=== Mexico ===
- Santa Catarina, Guanajuato, a town in the state of Guanajuato
- Santa Catarina, Morelos, a town in the state of Morelos
- Santa Catarina, Nuevo León, a city in the state of Nuevo León
- Santa Catarina Municipality, Nuevo León, a municipality in the state of Nuevo León
- Santa Catarina Ayometla (municipality), a municipality in the state of Tlaxcala
- Santa Catarina de Tepehuanes, a town in the state of Durango
- Misión Santa Catarina Virgen y Mártir, a colonial-era Dominican mission in Ensenada, Baja California
- Mission Santa Catarina Camoa, a Jesuit mission at modern-day Navojoa

==== Oaxaca ====
- Santa Catarina Cuixtla
- Santa Catalina Quierí
- Santa Catarina Ixtepeji
- Santa Catarina Juquila
- Santa Catarina Lachatao
- Santa Catarina Loxicha
- Santa Catarina Mechoacán
- Santa Catarina Minas
- Santa Catarina Quiané
- Santa Catarina Quioquitani
- Santa Catarina Tayata
- Santa Catarina Ticuá
- Santa Catarina Yosonotú
- Santa Catarina Zapoquila

=== Portugal ===
- Santa Catarina (Caldas da Rainha), a freguesia of Caldas da Rainha
- Santa Catarina (Lisbon), a freguesia of Lisbon

=== United States ===
- Santa Catarina, Texas, an unincorporated community in Starr County, Texas, United States

=== São Tomé and Príncipe ===
- Santa Catarina, São Tomé and Príncipe, a village in São Tomé Island

== Other uses ==
- Santa Catarina (ship), a Portuguese carrack that was seized by the Dutch East India Company off the coast of Singapore in 1603
- St. Catharina, a Roman Catholic parish in Dinklage, Germany

== See also ==
- Santa Caterina (disambiguation)
- Santa Catalina (disambiguation)
- St. Catherine (disambiguation)
