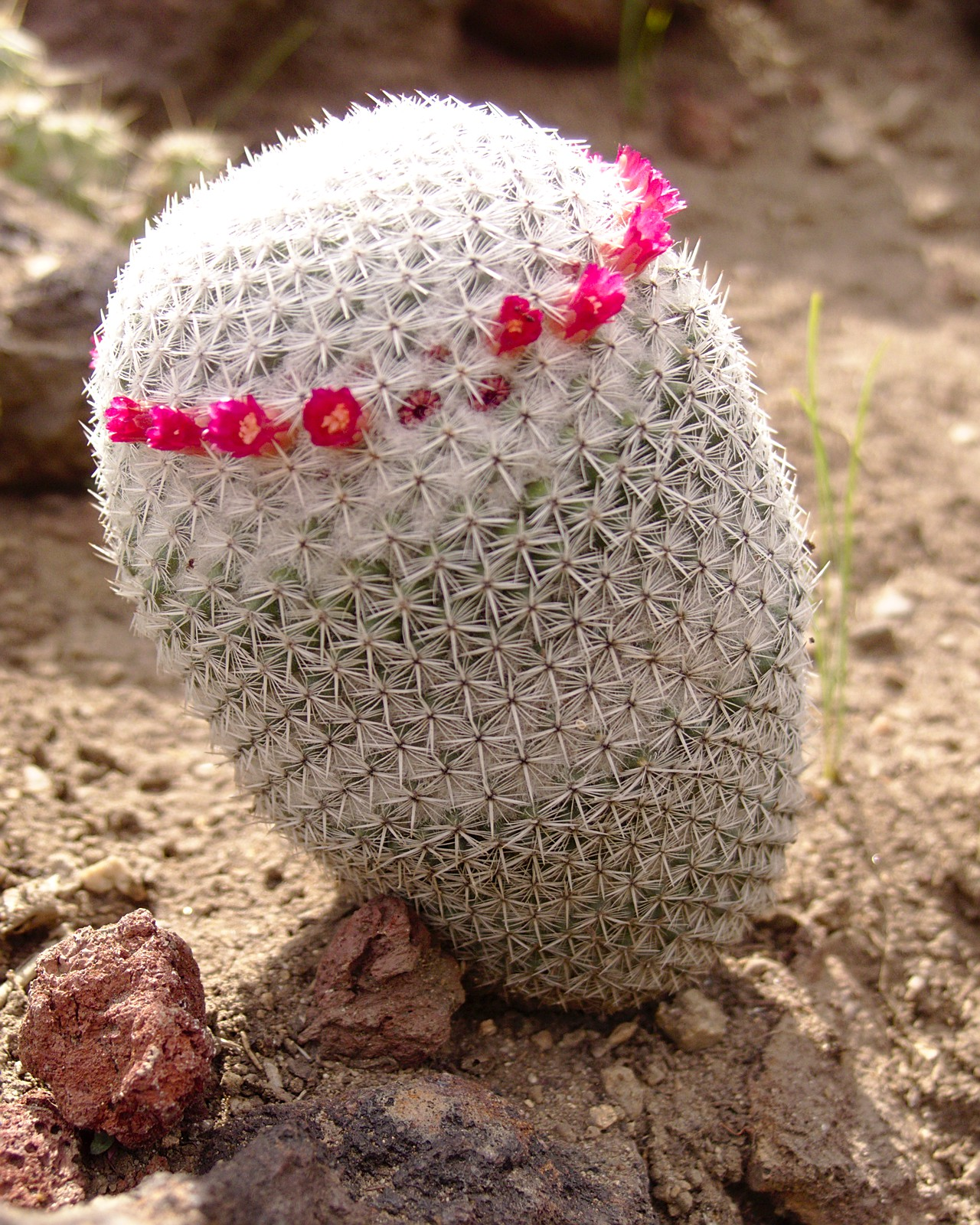

Conservation status
- Least Concern (IUCN 3.1)

Scientific classification
- Kingdom: Plantae
- Clade: Embryophytes
- Clade: Tracheophytes
- Clade: Spermatophytes
- Clade: Angiosperms
- Clade: Eudicots
- Order: Caryophyllales
- Family: Cactaceae
- Subfamily: Cactoideae
- Genus: Mammillaria
- Species: M. albilanata

Binomial name
- Mammillaria albilanata Backeb.

= Mammillaria albilanata =

Species of cactus

Mammillaria albilanata is a cactus species native to Mexico. The species is divided into four recognized subspecies: subsp. albilanata, subsp. oaxacana, subsp. reppenhagenii, and subsp. tegelbergiana. It occurs across the states of Chiapas, Colima, Guerrero, Oaxaca, and Puebla.

This cactus typically grows as a solitary plant with a short, cylindrical form, although it can form clusters in cultivation. It can reach up to 15 cm in height and 8 cm in width. The flowers are small and colorful, ranging from carmine red to purplish pink, and are followed by red fruits with brown seeds. It is found in various habitats, including rocky crevices and open areas, at altitudes between 500 and 2,400 meters, depending on the subspecies.

== Taxonomy ==
The botanist David Hunt views Mammillaria albilanata as encompassing M. reppenhagenii, M. tegelbergiana, M. ignota, but accepts these as subspecies of M. albilanata. He therefore recognizes the following subspecies:

- the type, subsp. albilanata (synonymous with M. fuaxiana, and M. igualensis, and M. igualensis var. palmillensis)
- subsp. oaxacana (synonymous with M. ignota, M. lanigera, M. lanigera var. juxtlahuacensis, M. monticola, and M. noureddineana)
- subsp. reppenhagenii (synonymous with M. reppenhagenii)
- subsp. tegelbergiana (synonymous with M. tegelbergiana)

These subspecies are not universally accepted; the Plants of the World Online, following Héctor Hernández and Carlos Gómez Hinostrosa, lists them as synonyms of M. albilanata.

== Description ==
=== General ===
Mammillaria albilanata can either grow as a single plant or form small clusters. It has a short, cylindrical shape, reaching up to 15 cm in height and 8 cm in width. The plant's tubercles (bumps) are short and cone-shaped, and the axils (the spaces between the tubercles) are covered with dense, curly white hairs. At first, the areoles (small pads from which spines grow) have a layer of short white wool. The central spines are typically two in number, about 2 mm long, starting out white but later developing yellow-brown or rusty tips. Around 18 to 20 radial spines surround them, each 2 to 3 mm long, white in color but brownish at their base. The flowers are small, only about 7.5 mm in size, and a deep carmine red.

Recent findings regarding Mammillaria albilanata reveal significant variation in both the shape and spination of the plants. Older specimens grown in collections are usually solitary, developing thick, short-columnar stems that reach approximately 15 cm in height and 7 cm in width. These plants are densely covered in wool, particularly around the flowering region, and feature short central spines that are barely noticeable beyond the woolly surface. In contrast, newer discoveries, excluding the recognized subspecies, display diverse traits. Some exhibit a tendency to form clusters, often with prolific growth. These clustered plants typically have smaller stems, measuring 3 to 5 cm in both height and width, and are less densely covered in wool. Others vary in their central spines, which in some cases are long, pale yellow, and resemble those of M. dixanthocentron, leading to potential confusion.

=== Subspecies ===
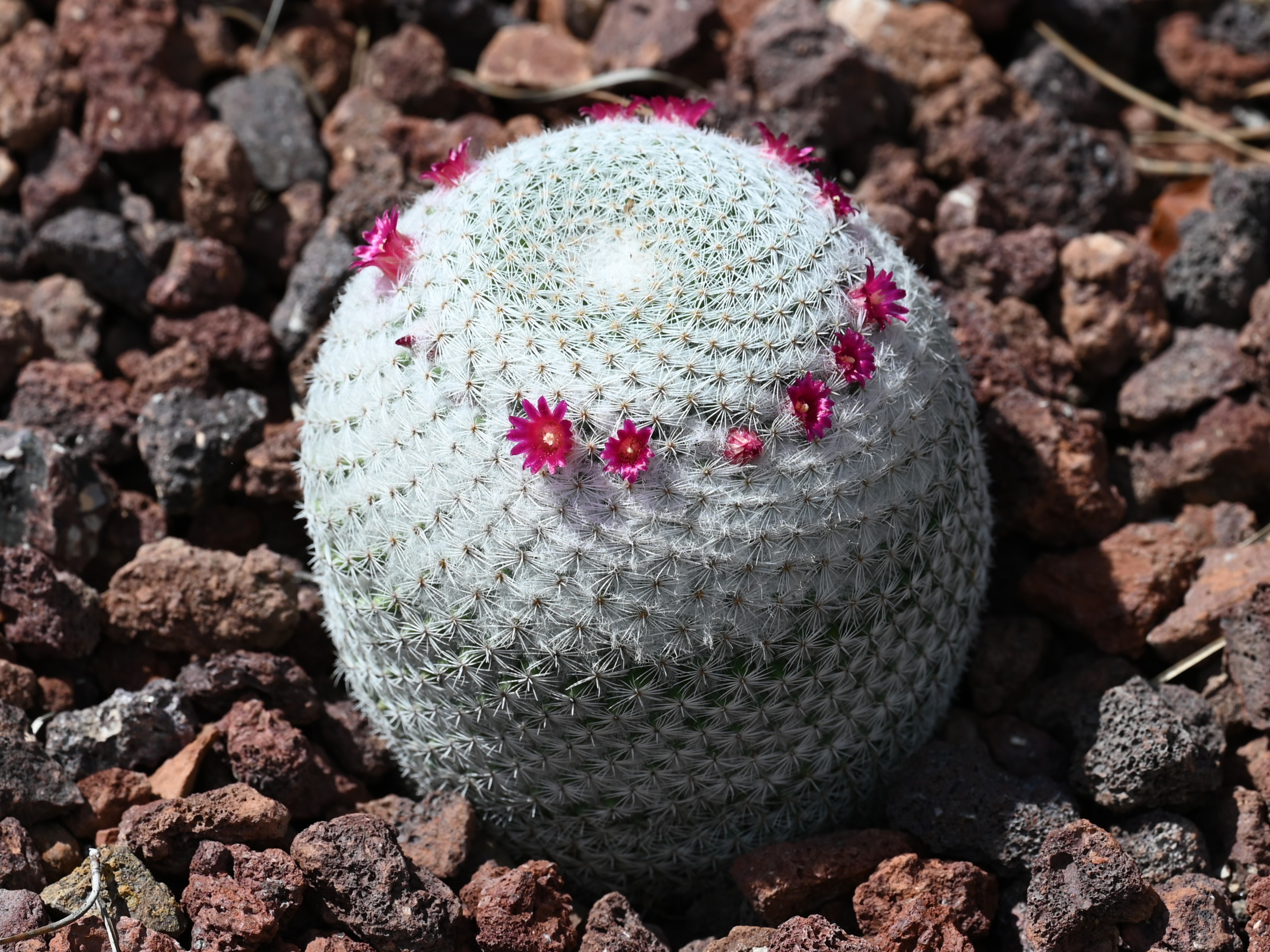
M. albilanata subsp. albilanata in bloom

The type subspecies, subsp. albilanata, is either solitary or forming clusters. These plants have short, cylindrical stems that can grow up to 15 cm tall and 8 cm wide. The crown is covered in dense white wool and spines, while the axils feature long white hairs and areoles with shorter wool. Radial spines, numbering 15 to 20, measure 2 to 4 mm in length. They are thin, needle-like, chalk-white, and slightly brown at the base, with the longer ones positioned at the sides. The plant also has 2 to 4 central spines, which are 2 to 3 mm long, slender, straight, and awl-shaped, with a white to cream color and brown tips. Small flowers emerge from the woolly crown, measuring 7 mm in length and displaying a deep carmine hue. The fruit is pink to red, and the seeds are pale brown.

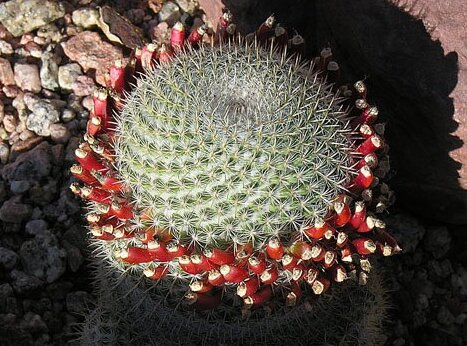
M. albilanata subsp. oaxacana bearing fruit

Mammillaria albilanata subsp. oaxacana has a depressed, globose form, with stems measuring between 3 and 7 cm in height and 4 to 7 cm in width. It features 20 to 22 radial spines that are bristle-like, glassy white, and 2 to 4 mm long. The central spines, numbering 1 to 4, are needle-like and glassy white with brown tips, ranging in length from 4 to 7 mm. The flowers are a vibrant carmine-pink with greenish stigmas. Its fruit is red, and the seeds are brown. The broader interpretation of this subspecies, including as synonymous M. lanigera, M. lanigera var. juxtlahuacensis, M. monticola, and M. noureddineana, allows for taller stems of up to 10 or 12 cm, a width of 8 cm, and variations in spine count—radial spines between 13 and 27, and central spines between 1 and 6.

Mammillaria albilanata subsp. reppenhagenii is typically single-stemmed, though it can occasionally form small clusters. It has a rounded to slightly column-like shape, growing up to 9 cm tall (though some can reach 15 cm) and about 6 cm wide. Both the areoles (where the spines grow) and the spaces between them are covered with short, white wool that persists over time. The plant has 19 to 26 radial spines, most often around 22 or 23, which are white and measure 2 to 3 mm long, with the ones on the sides being slightly longer. There are 2 to 5 central spines, usually 4, measuring 3 to 6.5 mm. These spines start out pinkish or reddish-brown with darker tips, gradually becoming lighter near the base as they age. The flowers are small, about 10 to 12 mm long and 5 to 8 mm wide, with a deep carmine color and lighter edges. The fruit is red, and the seeds are brown.

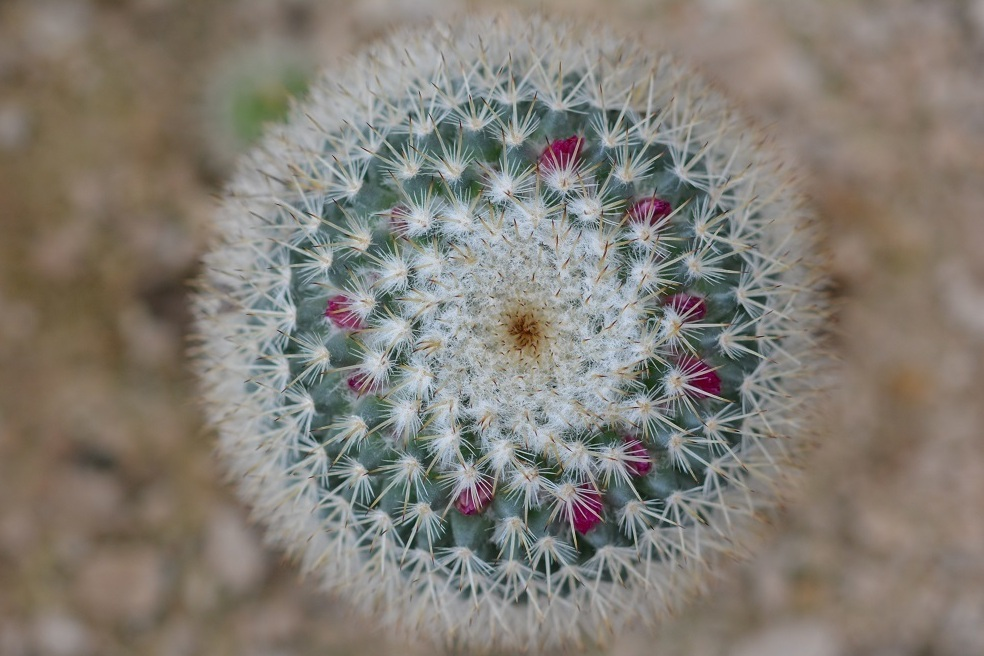
Top view of M. albilanata subsp. tegelbergiana, showing the apex

Mammillaria albilanata subsp. tegelbergiana is typically solitary-stemmed, though it may form clusters over time in cultivation. The subspecies is described as having a depressed-globose to subcylindrical form, growing up to 7 cm tall and 6 cm wide. Its axils initially display white wool. It features 18 to 24 radial spines, white and 2 to 4 mm long, along with 4 to 6 central spines that are white to straw-colored, measure 3 to 7 mm in length, and have dark brown tips. The flowers are a striking purplish pink, measuring 13 mm in length and 5 mm in width, with yellow stigmas. Fruits are red, and the seeds are brown.

== Distribution and habitat ==
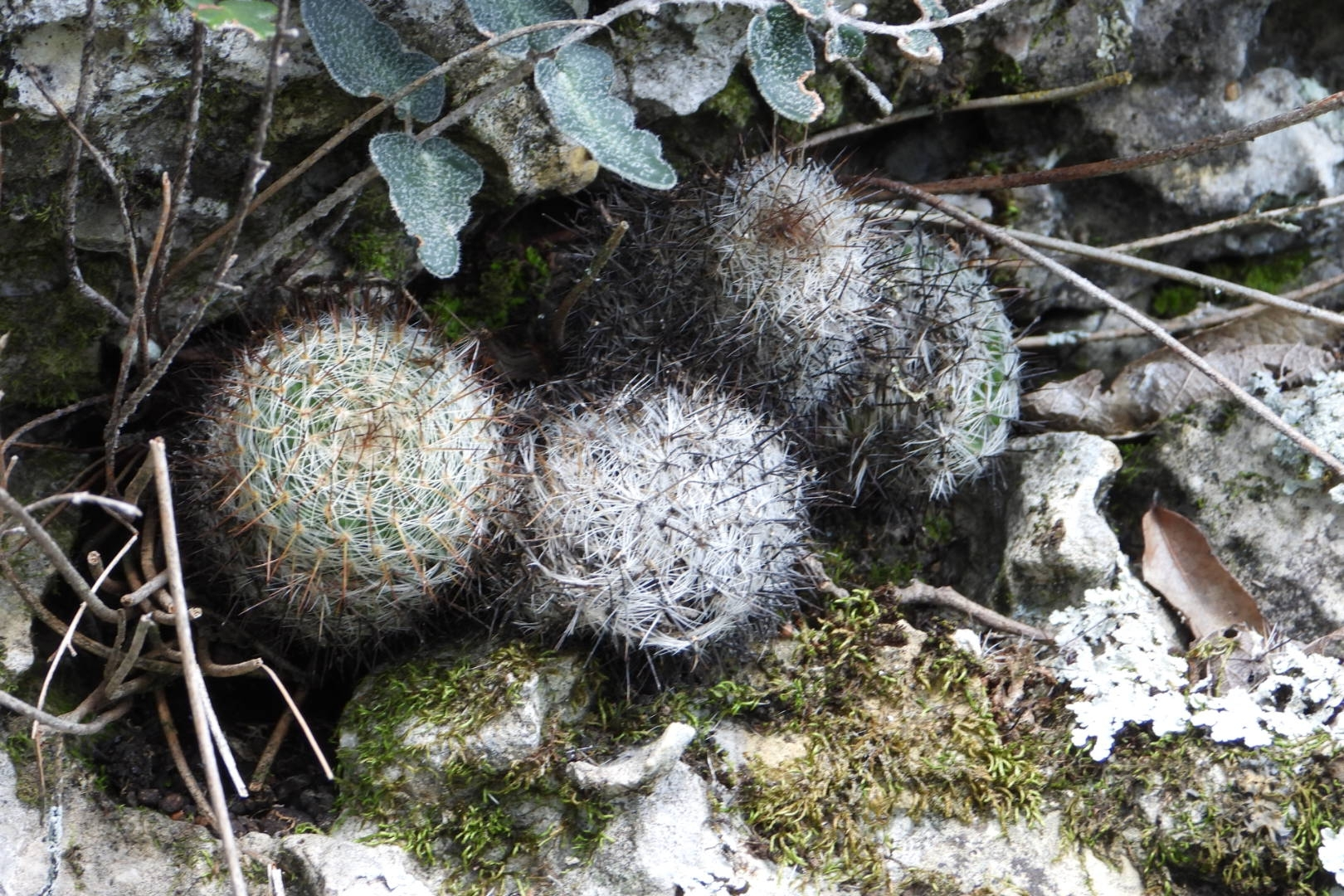
M. albilanata subsp. oaxacana in its habitat

Mammillaria albilanata is endemic to Mexico. The states in which it is found include Chiapas, Colima, Guerrero, and Oaxaca.

The type subspecies, subsp. albilanata, is native to Guerrero, where it is found at altitudes ranging from 500 to 2,200 meters. It primarily grows in the approximately 100 kilometers long mountainous area between the cities of Iguala and Chilpancingo, thriving in varied terrains, including the Zopilote Canyon's hilly regions rich in humus. Other recorded locations include Mexcala, and sites above Xochipala, and Teloloapan. Mammillaria albilanata subsp. oaxacana is native to Oaxaca and Puebla, thriving at altitudes of 700 to 2,400 meters. Specific locations in Oaxaca include San Pedro Mártir Quiechapa, San Sebastián Tecomaxtlahuaca/Santiago Juxtlahuaca, and south of Guelatao. Other sites include San Pedro Yolox, San Juan Quiotepec, San Juan del Estado, Mitla, Totolapan, Tlaxiaco, Yucunama, Huajuapan, Tamazulapan, Santo Domingo Tonalá, and Ocotepec. In Puebla, it is found in areas such as Acatlán de Osorio.

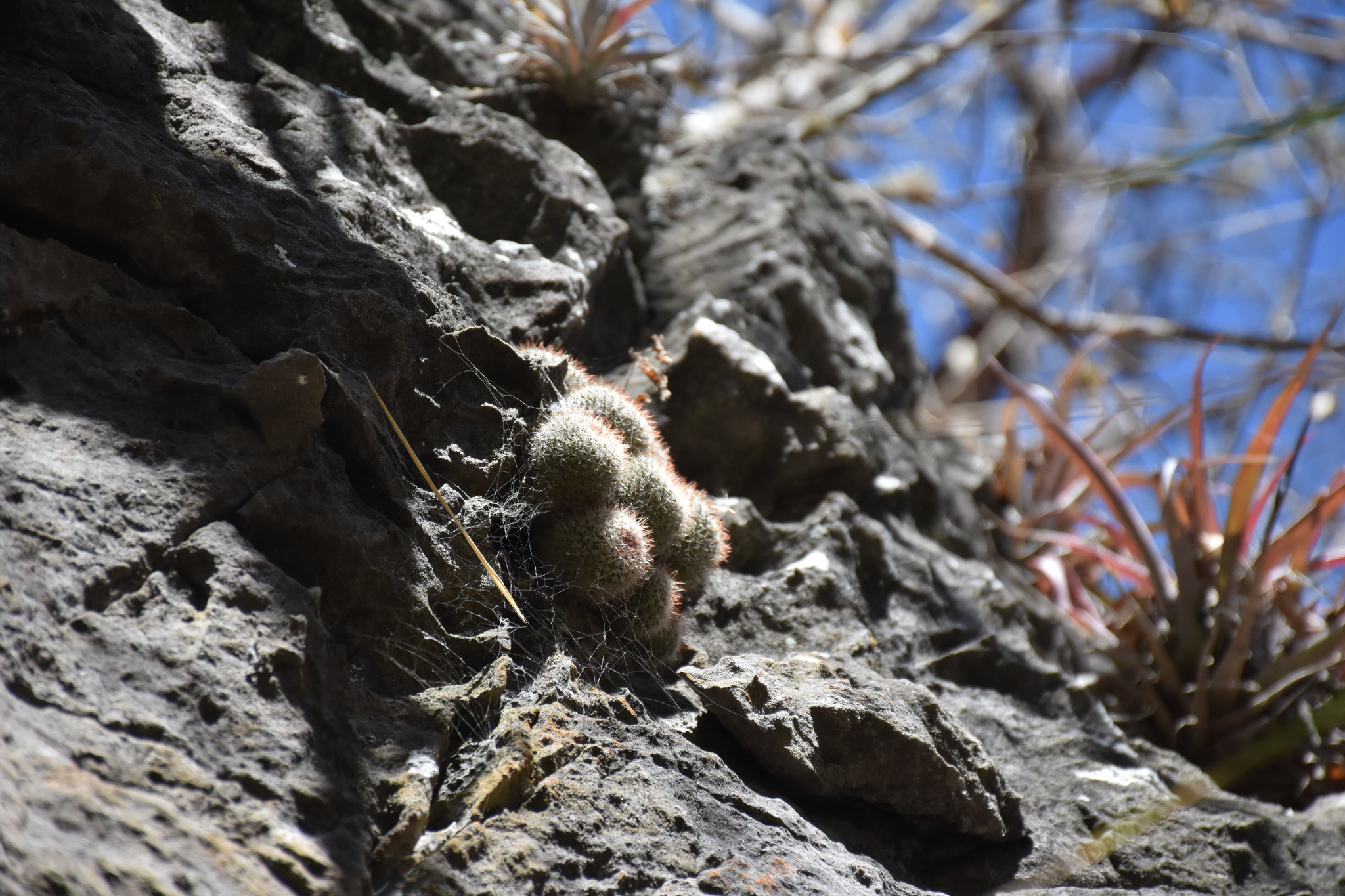
M. albilanata subsp. reppenhagenii growing among rocks

Mammillaria albilanata subsp. reppenhagenii is the westernmost subspecies. It is found in the coastal state of Colima in southwestern Mexico, at 900 to 1,300 m altitude.

Mammillaria albilanata subsp. tegelbergiana is native to Chiapas, found at elevations ranging from 700 to 2,200 m. It thrives in open areas and limestone crevices, particularly along Highway 190 near Ocozocoautla de Espinosa, and in areas such as the Sierra Ecatepec near Teopisca and San Cristóbal de las Casas.
