= Santa Cruz Tayata =

- Municipality and town
- Location in Mexico
- Coordinates: 17°21′23″N 97°34′07″W
- Country: Mexico
- State: Oaxaca

Population (2010)
  - Municipality and town: 608
  - Urban: 59
- Time zone: UTC-6 (Central Standard Time)

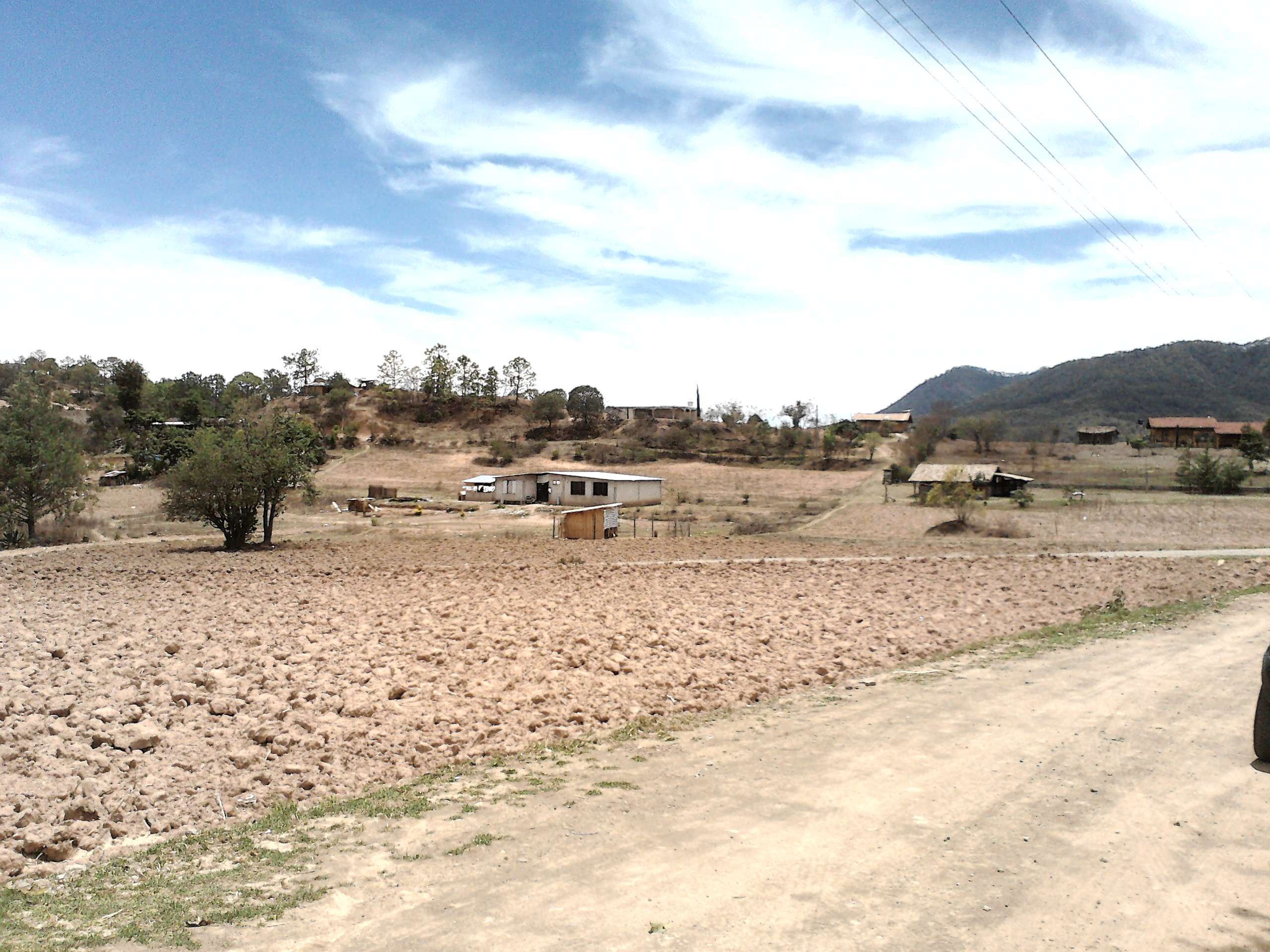

Santa Cruz Tayata is a town and municipality in Oaxaca in south-western Mexico. The municipality covers an area of km^{2}. It is part of the Tlaxiaco District in the south of the Mixteca Region.

As of the 2010 census, the town (locality), which serves as the municipal seat, had a population of 59 inhabitants, while the municipality had a total population of 608 inhabitants. The municipal seat is the third-smallest in all of Mexico (after Santa María del Rosario and Santa María Nduayaco).
