= Santa Catalina =

Santa Catalina may refer to:

- Catalina Thomás (1533–1574), Spanish saint and patron saint of Mallorca

== Places ==
=== Argentina ===
- Santa Catalina Department, a department of Argentina
  - Santa Catalina, Jujuy, capital of the department
- Santa Catalina, Córdoba, a settlement in Río Cuarto Department

=== Colombia ===
- Archipelago of San Andrés, Providencia and Santa Catalina
  - Providencia and Santa Catalina Islands, a municipality
  - Santa Catalina Island (Colombia)
- Santa Catalina, Bolívar

=== Dominican Republic ===
- Catalina Island (Dominican Republic), south of La Romana

=== Guatemala ===
- Santa Catalina la Tinta, Alta Verapaz

=== Mexico ===
- Isla Santa Catalina, Gulf of California, Baja California Sur
- Santa Catalina Quieri, Oaxaca

=== Panama ===
- Santa Catalina, Panama, Pacific coast of Veraguas

=== Peru ===
- Santa Catalina de Mossa District, Morropon Province, Piura
- Santa Catalina District, Luya Province, Amazonas
- Santa Catalina, Lima, a neighborhood in La Victoria District, Lima
- Santa Catalina, a traditional neighbourhood of Barrios Altos, where the following are located:
  - Church of Saint Catherine of Siena
  - Fort of Santa Catalina, Lima, a colonial fort in Lima

=== Philippines ===
- Santa Catalina, Ilocos Sur
- Santa Catalina, Negros Oriental
- Santa Catalina, San Pablo City

=== Spain ===
- Castle of Santa Catalina (Cádiz)
- Castle of Santa Catalina (Jaén)
- Castillo de Santa Catalina (La Palma)
- Isla de Santa Catalina, off the Península de Almina in Ceuta
- Botanical Garden of Santa Catalina, Trespuentes, Álava province, Basque Country
- Santa Catalina, Valencia, a Catholic church in Valencia
- University of Santa Catalina in El Burgo de Osma, Castilla and Leon

=== United States ===
- Gulf of Santa Catalina
- Santa Catalina Island (California)
- Santa Catalina Mountains, north of Tucson, Arizona
- Santa Catalina School, Monterey, California
- Santa Catalina Palace, also known as La Fortaleza, San Juan, Puerto Rico
- Santa Catalina de Guale, a Spanish Franciscan mission and town in Spanish Florida from 1602 to 1702

=== Others ===
- Santa Catalina (Solomon Islands), an island
- Santa Catalina, Uruguay

== Other uses ==
- "26 Miles (Santa Catalina)", a 1958 song by The Four Preps
- SS Santa Catalina

== See also ==
- Santa Catarina (disambiguation)
- St. Catherine (disambiguation)
