= Tayata =

Tayata may refer to:

- Santa Cruz Tayata
- Santa Catarina Tayata
