= Santa Cruz Tacache de Mina =

- Municipality and town
- Location in Mexico
- Coordinates: 17°49′N 98°9′W
- Country: Mexico
- State: Oaxaca
- Time zone: UTC-6 (Central Standard Time)

Santa Cruz Tacache de Mina is a town and municipality in Oaxaca in south-western Mexico. The municipality covers an area of km^{2}. It is part of the Huajuapan District in the north of the Mixteca Region.

In 2020, the town had a total population of 2,940, growing 12.8% from 2010.
