= Zacatepec (disambiguation) =

Zacatepec is a Mexican football club:

Zacatepec may also refer to:

== Languages ==
- Zacatepec Chatino
- Zacatepec Mixtec

== Places ==
- San Martín Zacatepec, Oaxaca
- Santa María Zacatepec, Oaxaca
- Santiago Zacatepec, Oaxaca
- Zacatepec, Morelos, town and municipality in Morelos
