= Camotlán =

Camotlán may refer to a number of places and languages in Mexico:

== Geography ==
- San Lucas Camotlán, Oaxaca
- Santiago Camotlán, Oaxaca
- Santa María Camotlán, Oaxaca

== Languages ==
- Camotlan Mixe language
