= San Miguel Amatitlán =

- Municipality and town
- Location in Mexico
- Coordinates: 17°55′N 98°01′W
- Country: Mexico
- State: Oaxaca

Area
  - Total: 198.48 km^{2} (76.63 sq mi)

Population (2005)
  - Total: 5,938
- Time zone: UTC-6 (Central Standard Time)

San Miguel Amatitlán is a town and municipality in Oaxaca in south-western Mexico. The municipality covers an area of 198.48 km^{2}. It is part of the Huajuapan District in the north of the Mixteca Region.

As of 2005, the municipality had a total population of 5,938.
