= San Simón Zahuatlán =

San Simón Zahuatlan
- Municipality and town
- Location in Mexico
- Coordinates: 17°51′N 98°00′W
- Country: Mexico
- State: Oaxaca

Population (2005)
  - Total: 2,481
- Time zone: UTC-6 (Central Standard Time)

San Simón Zahuatlan is a town and municipality in Oaxaca in south-western Mexico. The municipality covers an area of km^{2}. It is part of the Huajuapan District in the north of the Mixteca Region.

As of 2005, the municipality had a total population of 2,481.
