= Mariscala de Juárez =

- Municipality and town
- Location in Mexico
- Coordinates: 17°52′N 98°08′W
- Country: Mexico
- State: Oaxaca

Area
  - Total: 72.72 km^{2} (28.08 sq mi)

Population (2005)
  - Total: 3,140
- Time zone: UTC-6 (Central Standard Time)

Mariscala de Juárez is a town and municipality in Oaxaca in south-western Mexico. The municipality covers an area of 72.72 km^{2}. It is part of the Huajuapan District in the north of the Mixteca Region.

As of 2005, the municipality had a total population of 3,140.
