= Ixcatlán =

Ixcatlán may refer to:

- San Pedro Ixcatlán, Oaxaca
- Santo Domingo Ixcatlán, Oaxaca
- Santa María Ixcatlán, Oaxaca
- Ixcatlán Mazatec language
