= Santa María Nduayaco =

- Municipality and town
- Location in Mexico
- Coordinates: 17°24′37″N 97°29′50″W
- Country: Mexico
- State: Oaxaca

Population (2010)
  - Municipality and town: 550
  - Urban: 57
- Time zone: UTC-6 (Central Standard Time)

Santa María Nduayaco is a town and municipality in Oaxaca in south-western Mexico. The municipality covers an area of km^{2}. It is part of the Teposcolula District in the center of the Mixteca Region.

== Demographics ==
As of the 2010 census, the town, which serves as the municipal seat, had a population of 57 inhabitants, while the municipality had a total population of 550 inhabitants. Its municipal seat is the second-smallest (to Santa María del Rosario) in all of Mexico.
