= Antonio Riaño (murderer) =

Mexican criminal

- Born: Zapotitlán Palmas, Oaxaca, Mexico
- Status: Awaiting trial in Butler County Jail, Ohio, United States
- Other name: El Diablo

Antonio Riaño, also known as "El Diablo," is a Mexican national who was wanted for a 2004 murder in Hamilton, Ohio, United States. He spent nearly 20 years on the run and was featured on America's Most Wanted. In 2024, he was captured in Zapotitlán Palmas, Oaxaca, Mexico—where he had been working as a police officer—and extradited to the U.S. to face charges.

Riaño was found guilty of murder on 13 June 2025 and given a sentence of 18 years to life.
