= San Jorge Nuchita =

- Municipality and town
- Location in Mexico
- Coordinates: 17°39′N 96°06′W
- Country: Mexico
- State: Oaxaca

Area
  - Total: 67.62 km^{2} (26.11 sq mi)

Population (2005)
  - Total: 2,957
- Time zone: UTC-6 (Central Standard Time)

San Jorge Nuchita is a town and municipality in Oaxaca in south-western Mexico. The municipality covers an area of 67.62 km^{2}. It is part of the Huajuapan District in the north of the Mixteca Region.

As of 2005, the municipality had a total population of 2,957.
