= San Juan Bautista Suchitepec =

- Municipality and town
- Location in Mexico
- Coordinates: 17°58′N 97°39′W
- Country: Mexico
- State: Oaxaca

Area
  - Total: 38.28 km^{2} (14.78 sq mi)

Population (2005)
  - Total: 412
- Time zone: UTC-6 (Central Standard Time)

San Juan Bautista Suchitepec is a town and municipality in Oaxaca in south-western Mexico. The municipality covers an area of 38.28 km^{2}. It is part of the Huajuapan District in the north of the Mixteca Region.

As of 2005, the municipality had a total population of 412.
