= San José Ayuquila =

- Municipality and town
- Location in Mexico
- Coordinates: 17°56′N 97°58′W
- Country: Mexico
- State: Oaxaca

Area
  - Total: 35.72 km^{2} (13.79 sq mi)

Population (2005)
  - Total: 1,342
- Time zone: UTC-6 (Central Standard Time)

San José Ayuquila is a town and municipality in Oaxaca in south-western Mexico. The municipality covers an area of 35.72 km^{2}. It is part of the Huajuapan District in the north of the Mixteca Region.

As of 2005, the municipality had a total population of 1,342.
