= Santos Reyes Yucuná =

Coordinates: 17°47′N 98°00′W

- Municipality and town
- Interactive map of Santos Reyes Yucuná
- Country: Mexico
- State: Oaxaca

Population (2005)
  - Total: 1,322
- Time zone: UTC-6 (Central Standard Time)

Santos Reyes Yucuná is a town and municipality in Oaxaca in south-western Mexico. The municipality covers an area of km^{2}. It is part of the Huajuapan District in the north of the Mixteca Region.

As of 2005, the municipality had a total population of 1,322.
