= San Marcos Arteaga =

- Municipality and town
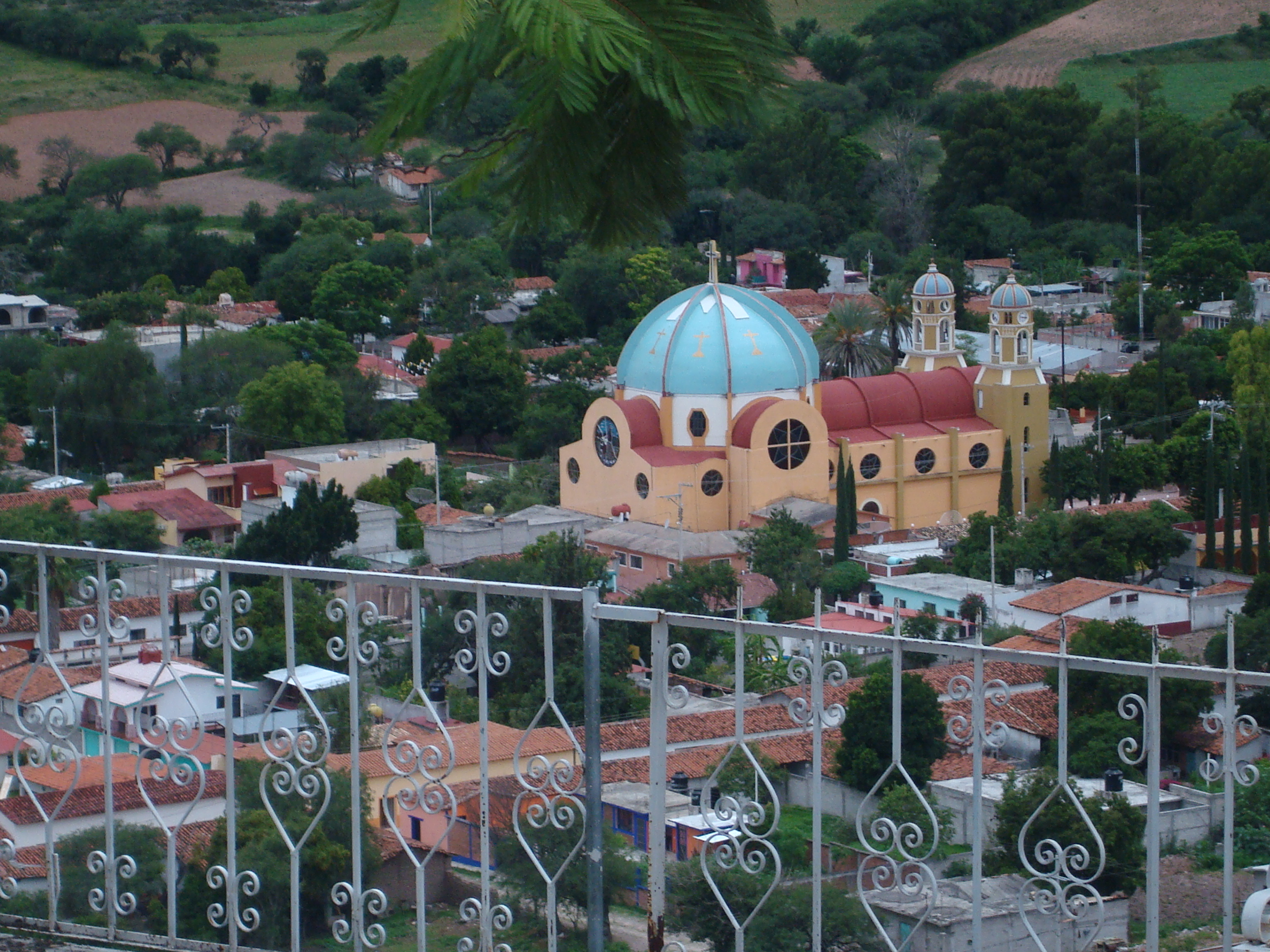

- Location in Mexico
- Coordinates: 17°43′N 97°51′W
- Country: Mexico
- State: Oaxaca

Area
  - Total: 133.96 km^{2} (51.72 sq mi)

Population (2005)
  - Total: 2,110
- Time zone: UTC-6 (Central Standard Time)

San Marcos Arteaga is a town and municipality in Oaxaca in south-western Mexico. The municipality covers an area of 133.96 km^{2}. It is part of the Huajuapan District in the north of the Mixteca Region.

As of 2005, the municipality had a total population of 2,110.
