= Santiago Nuyoó =

Coordinates: 17°01′N 97°46′W

- Municipality and town
- Interactive map of Santiago Nuyoó
- Country: Mexico
- State: Oaxaca
- Time zone: UTC-6 (Central Standard Time)

Santiago Nuyoó is a town and municipality in Oaxaca in south-western Mexico. The municipality covers an area of km^{2}. It is part of the Tlaxiaco District in the south of the Mixteca Region.

As of 2005, the municipality had a total population of .
