= San Agustín Tlacotepec =

- Municipality and town
- Location in Mexico
- Coordinates: 17°12′N 97°31′W
- Country: Mexico
- State: Oaxaca

Area
  - Total: 79.1 km^{2} (30.5 sq mi)

Population (2005)
  - Total: 876
- Time zone: UTC-6 (Central Standard Time)

San Agustín Tlacotepec is a town and municipality in Oaxaca in south-western Mexico. The municipality covers an area of 79.1 km^{2}. It is part of the Tlaxiaco District in the south of the Mixteca Region.

As of 2005, the municipality had a total population of 876.
