= San Juan Ñumí =

- Municipality and town
- Location in Mexico
- Coordinates: 17°24′N 97°42′W
- Country: Mexico
- State: Oaxaca

Area
  - Total: 43.38 km^{2} (16.75 sq mi)

Population (2005)
  - Total: 5,796
- Time zone: UTC-6 (Central Standard Time)

San Juan Ñumí is a town and municipality in Oaxaca in south-western Mexico. The municipality covers an area of 43.38 km^{2}. It is part of the Tlaxiaco District in the south of the Mixteca Region.

In 2005, the municipality had a population of 5,796.
