= Santiago Ayuquililla =

- Municipality and town
- Location in Mexico
- Coordinates: 17°57′N 97°58′W
- Country: Mexico
- State: Oaxaca
- Time zone: UTC-6 (Central Standard Time)

Santiago Ayuquililla is a town and municipality in Oaxaca in south-western Mexico. The municipality covers an area of 90.13 km^{2}. It is part of the Huajuapan District in the north of the Mixteca Region.

As of 2010, the municipality had a total population of 2,748.
