= San Andrés Dinicuiti =

- Municipality and town
- Location in Mexico
- Coordinates: 17°41′N 97°44′W
- Country: Mexico
- State: Oaxaca

Area
  - Total: 121.2 km^{2} (46.8 sq mi)

Population (2005)
  - Total: 2,114
- Time zone: UTC-6 (Central Standard Time)

San Andrés Dinicuiti is a town and municipality in Oaxaca in south-western Mexico. The municipality covers an area of 121.2 km^{2}. It is part of the Huajuapan District in the north of the Mixteca Region.

As of 2005, the municipality had a total population of 2,114.
