= Santo Domingo Ixcatlán =

Coordinates: 16°55′N 97°32′W

- Municipality and town
- Interactive map of Santo Domingo Ixcatlán
- Country: Mexico
- State: Oaxaca
- Time zone: UTC-6 (Central Standard Time)

Santo Domingo Ixcatlán is a town and municipality in Oaxaca in south-western Mexico. The municipality covers an area of ❓ km^{2}. It is part of the Tlaxiaco District in the south of the Mixteca Region.

As of 2005, the municipality had a total population of ❓.
