= Santa María Ecatepec =

- Municipality and town
- Location in Mexico
- Coordinates: 16°17′N 95°53′W
- Country: Mexico
- State: Oaxaca

Area
  - Total: 719.56 km^{2} (277.82 sq mi)
- Elevation: 1,840 m (6,040 ft)

Population (2010)
  - Total: 3,461
- Time zone: UTC-6 (Central Standard Time)

Santa María Ecatepec is a town and municipality in Oaxaca in south-western Mexico. It is part of the Yautepec District in the east of the Sierra Sur Region. The name "Ecatepec" means "mountain air".

== Geography ==
The municipality covers an area of 719.56 km^{2} at an elevation of 1,840 meters above sea level in the Sierra Madre del Sur mountains. The climate is temperate humid. Forests contain pine, oak, mahogany, cedar, ash, Tepehuaje, guanacastle and cuachipilin. Fruit trees such as mango, sapodilla, mamey, sapodilla, orange, lime, peach, pear, pumpkin, apple, soursop and guava are grown. Wildlife includes coyote, fox, puma, deer, squirrel, badger, armadillo, ocelot, lion, wolf, raccoon, opossum and boar. There are many species of birds.

== Demographics ==
As of 2005, the municipality had a total population of 4,253 of whom 515 spoke an indigenous language.

== Economy ==
Economic activities include agriculture (maize, sorghum, peanuts, beans, coffee and various fruits), animal husbandry, logging, pottery and tannery.
