= San Juan Juquila Mixes =

- Municipality and town
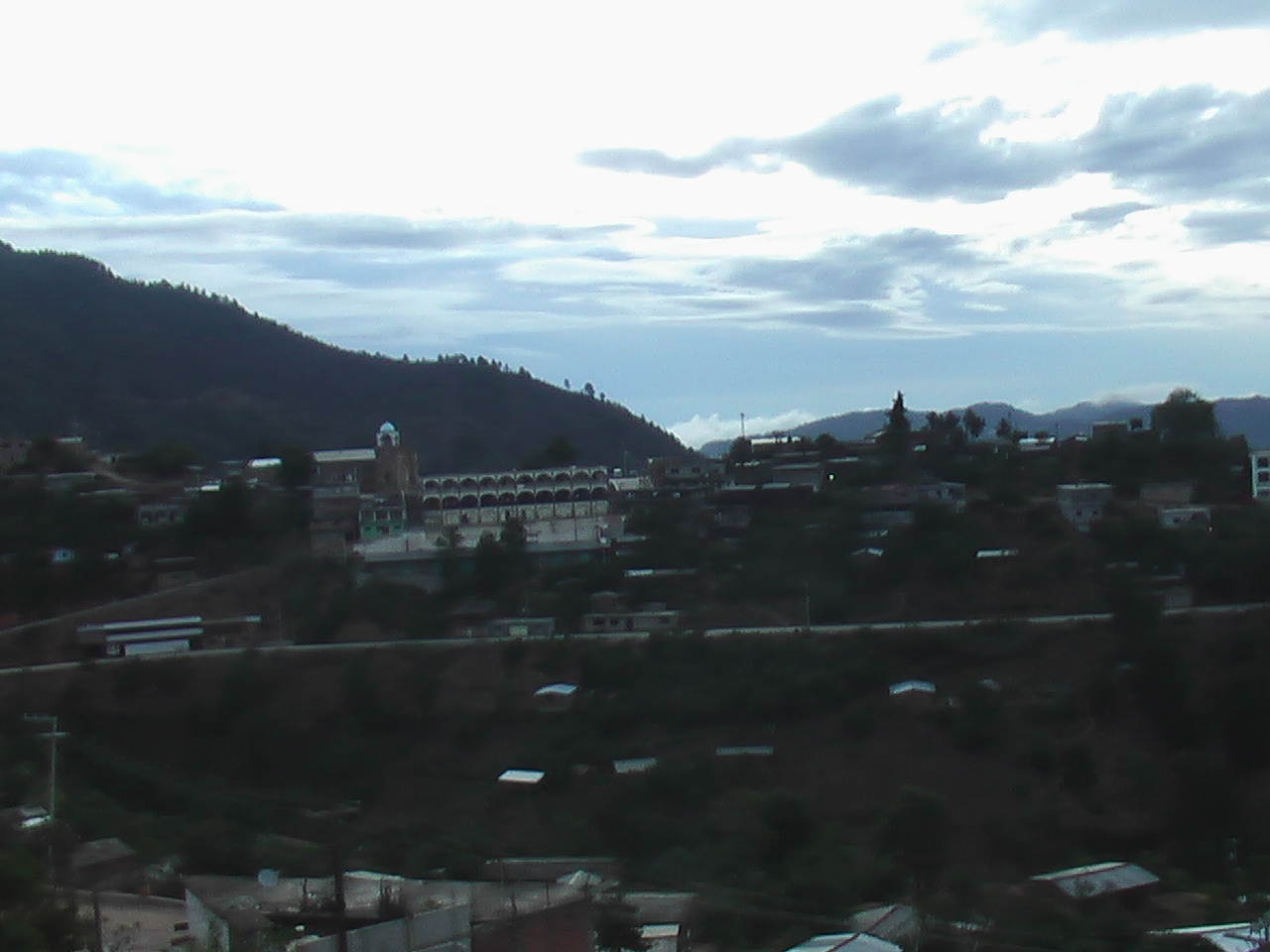

- Location in Mexico
- Coordinates: 16°56′N 95°55′W
- Country: Mexico
- State: Oaxaca

Area
  - Total: 227.1 km^{2} (87.7 sq mi)

Population (2005)
  - Total: 3,557
- Time zone: UTC-6 (Central Standard Time)

San Juan Juquila Mixes is a town and municipality in Oaxaca in south-western Mexico. It is part of the Yautepec District in the east of the Sierra Sur Region. The name "Juquila" means "beautiful vegetables".

== Geography ==
The municipality covers an area of 227.1 km^{2} at an altitude of 1,420 meters above sea level. The terrain is rugged, with a cool climate. Native trees include pine, guanacastle and cedar. Mango, avocado, sapodilla, mamey, soursop, banana, guava, oranges, tangerines and other fruit trees are grown. Wildlife includes deer, rabbit, cat, wild boar, armadillo, mountain lion, coyote, badger and leopard.

== Demography ==
The municipality is in a region traditionally inhabited by the Mixe people. In the 17th century the Spanish decided to make San Juan Juquila a population center, since it was near to transportation routes, and moved people from other communities to the town. The original population of 300 had grown by 1661 AD to 1,741, but the attempt had limited success due to resistance from the indigenous community. As of 2005, the municipality had 873 households with a total population of 3,557 of whom 3,094 spoke an indigenous language.

== Economy ==
The main economic activity is agriculture, growing maize, beans and coffee to a lesser extent for local consumption. Some people keep cattle. Hunting and fishing is practiced for local consumption. The Union of Indigenous Communities of the Isthmus Region, a cooperative founded in 1982, assists in production and distribution of the local products under a fair trade label.
