= Tlaxiaco District =

- District
- Oaxaca regions and districts: Mixteca to Northwest
- Coordinates: 17°16′N 97°41′W
- Country: Mexico
- State: Oaxaca

Population (2020)
  - Total: 102,875

Tlaxiaco District is located in the south of the Mixteca Region of the State of Oaxaca, Mexico. The main city is the Heroic City of Tlaxiaco.

== Municipalities ==
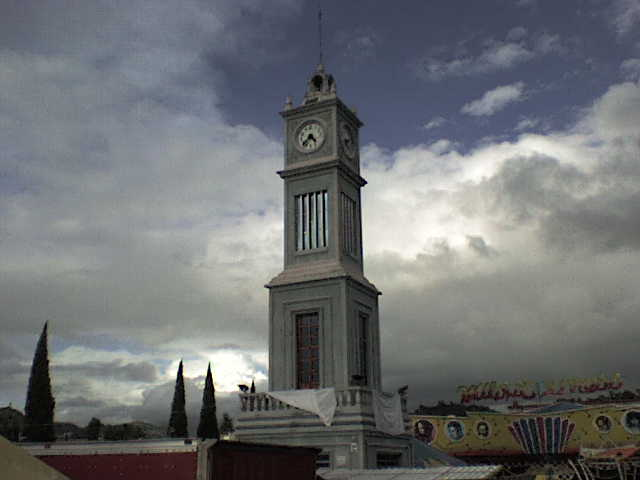
Clock tower in Tlaxiaco

The district includes the following municipalities:

Municipality code	Name	Population		Land Area			Population density	
Municipality code	Name	2020	Rank	km^{2}	sq mi	Rank	2020	Rank
026	Chalcatongo de Hidalgo	9,035	2	133.5	51.5	3	68/km^{2} (175/sq mi)	2
050	Magdalena Peñasco	3,750	7	85.07	32.85	8	44/km^{2} (114/sq mi)	7
086	San Agustín Tlacotepec	1,032	20	51.40	19.85	17	20/km^{2} (52/sq mi)	24
110	San Antonio Sinicahua	1,668	14	29.24	11.29	28	57/km^{2} (148/sq mi)	4
119	San Bartolomé Yucuañe	735	24	85.91	33.17	7	9/km^{2} (22/sq mi)	32
127	San Cristóbal Amoltepec	1,252	18	31.80	12.28	26	39/km^{2} (102/sq mi)	12
221	San Esteban Atatlahuca	3,934	6	109.2	42.2	5	36/km^{2} (93/sq mi)	13
172	San Juan Achiutla	408	32	35.61	13.75	24	11/km^{2} (30/sq mi)	29
210	San Juan Ñumí	5,773	3	212.1	81.9	2	27/km^{2} (70/sq mi)	19
218	San Juan Teita	544	29	71	27	12	8/km^{2} (20/sq mi)	33
239	San Martín Huamelulpan	1,000	21	42.77	16.51	20	23/km^{2} (61/sq mi)	22
240	San Martín Itunyoso	2,749	10	63.74	24.61	14	43/km^{2} (112/sq mi)	8
252	San Mateo Peñasco	2,384	11	55.88	21.58	16	43/km^{2} (110/sq mi)	9
258	San Miguel Achiutla	698	26	67.59	26.10	13	10/km^{2} (27/sq mi)	30
269	San Miguel El Grande	4,313	5	103.3	39.9	6	42/km^{2} (108/sq mi)	11
297	San Pablo Tijaltepec	2,751	9	117.5	45.4	4	23/km^{2} (61/sq mi)	23
317	San Pedro Mártir Yucuxaco	1,257	17	81.88	31.61	9	15/km^{2} (40/sq mi)	28
320	San Pedro Molinos	706	25	26.40	10.19	29	27/km^{2} (69/sq mi)	20
370	Santa Catarina Tayata	662	27	38.59	14.90	21	17/km^{2} (44/sq mi)	27
371	Santa Catarina Ticua	986	22	29.78	11.50	27	33/km^{2} (86/sq mi)	15
372	Santa Catarina Yosonotú	1,316	16	38.28	14.78	22	34/km^{2} (89/sq mi)	14
379	Santa Cruz Nundaco	2,951	8	43.56	16.82	19	65/km^{2} (168/sq mi)	3
382	Santa Cruz Tacahua	1,182	19	47.42	18.31	18	25/km^{2} (65/sq mi)	21
383	Santa Cruz Tayata	595	28	21.78	8.41	31	27/km^{2} (71/sq mi)	17
408	Santa María del Rosario	499	30	25.21	9.73	30	20/km^{2} (51/sq mi)	25
430	Santa María Tataltepec	317	33	37.06	14.31	23	9/km^{2} (22/sq mi)	31
444	Santa María Yolotepec	481	31	17.92	6.92	33	27/km^{2} (70/sq mi)	18
445	Santa María Yosoyúa	1,699	13	33.59	12.97	25	51/km^{2} (131/sq mi)	6
480	Santiago Nundiche	1,351	15	71.33	27.54	11	19/km^{2} (49/sq mi)	26
481	Santiago Nuyoó	1,898	12	58.08	22.42	15	33/km^{2} (85/sq mi)	16
510	Santo Domingo Ixcatlán	760	23	17.92	6.92	32	42/km^{2} (109/sq mi)	10
532	Santo Tomás Ocotepec	4,066	5	80.05	30.91	10	51/km^{2} (132/sq mi)	5
397	Tlaxiaco	40,123	1	346.5	133.8	1	116/km^{2} (300/sq mi)	1
	Distrito Tlaxiaco	102,875	—	2,311	892.28	—	45/km^{2} (115/sq mi)	—
Source: INEGI
