= Magdalena Peñasco =

- Municipality and town
- Location within Oaxaca Location within Mexico
- Coordinates: 17°14′N 97°33′W
- Country: Mexico
- State: Oaxaca

Area
  - Total: 75.27 km^{2} (29.06 sq mi)

Population (2005)
  - Total: 3,461
- Time zone: UTC-6 (Central Standard Time)

Magdalena Peñasco is a town and municipality in the state of Oaxaca in south-western Mexico. The municipality covers an area of 75.27 km^{2}. It is part of the Tlaxiaco District in the south of the Mixteca Region.

As of 2005, the municipality had a total population of 3,461.
