= San Martín Zacatepec =

- Municipality and town
- Location in Mexico
- Coordinates: 17°48′N 98°04′W
- Country: Mexico
- State: Oaxaca

Area
  - Total: 76.55 km^{2} (29.56 sq mi)

Population (2005)
  - Total: 1,199
- Time zone: UTC-6 (Central Standard Time)

San Martín Zacatepec is a town and municipality in Oaxaca in south-western Mexico. The municipality covers an area of 76.55 km^{2}. It is part of the Huajuapan District in the north of the Mixteca Region.

As of 2005, the municipality had a total population of 1,199.
