= Nejapa de Madero =

- Municipality and town
- Location in Mexico Nejapa de Madero (Mexico)
- Coordinates: 16°36′N 95°59′W
- Country: Mexico
- State: Oaxaca

Area
  - Total: 370 km^{2} (140 sq mi)

Population (2005)
  - Total: 7,285
- Time zone: UTC-6 (Central Standard Time)

Nejapa de Madero is a town and municipality in Oaxaca in south-western Mexico. It is part of the Yautepec District in the east of the Sierra Sur Region, not far from the main highway between Oaxaca, Oaxaca and Salina Cruz. The name "Nejapa" means "ash water".

== Geography ==
The municipality covers an area of 370 km^{2} at an altitude of 660 meters above sea level. The climate is warm, with rain in summer and autumn. Tree include pine and oak, and fruits such as papaya, melon, watermelon, tomatoes, peppers, banana, mango, orange, lemon and sapota grow here. Wild fauna include deer, coyote, rabbits, costoche, raccoon, badger, opossum, iguana, dove, squirrels, eagles, hawk and vulture.

== History ==
The prehispanic settlement of Nejapa had many gods, including ones governing water, wind, agriculture, hunting, fishing, childbirth or fertility, war, peace, "a god for all works", and even a god of gods. There was a fast that lasted forty days, during which only meat from hunting could be eaten, and penance and confession were practiced. Sacrifice was practiced on some structures on nearby Mount Quiatoni. Criminal punishment was harsh: adultery was punished by separating and stoning the offenders, lying by laying the mouth open to the molars, and illicit fornication by slitting the nostrils and genitals.

Nejapa was founded around 1548 by the Spaniards after they conquered Mexico. One of the founders and first parish priest of the village was the friar Pedro García, a native of Navamorales in Salamanca, Spain.

== Demography ==
As of 2005, the municipality had 1,702 households with a total population of 7,285 of whom 1,300 spoke an indigenous language.

== Economy ==
Economic activities include cultivation of maize, sorghum, peanuts and other crops such as beans, coffee and various fruits, and animal husbandry. There is some logging. Many of the people produce mezcal. The Union of Indigenous Communities of the Isthmus Region, a cooperative founded in 1982, assists in production and distribution of the local products, notably coffee, under a fair trade label.
