= USS Black Hawk (AD-9) =

Tender of the United States Navy

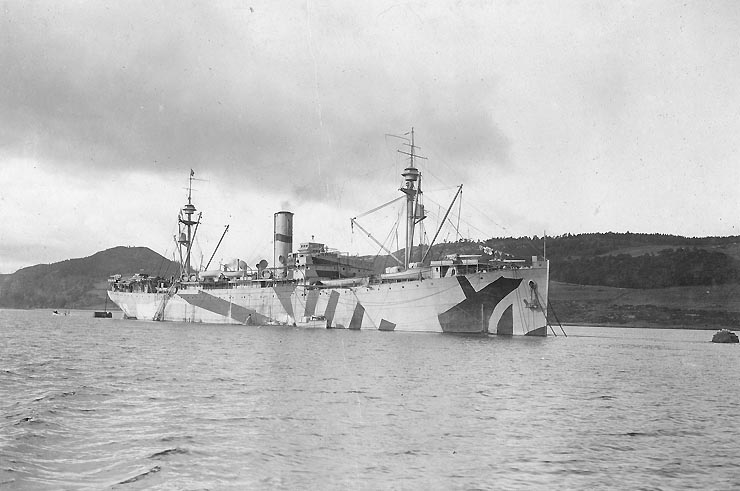
- USS Black Hawk (ID # 2140) Moored at Inverness, Scotland, in September 1918, while serving as Mine Force repair ship and flagship, and painted with a camouflage pattern.

History

United States
- Name: USS Black Hawk
- Builder: William Cramp & Sons, Philadelphia
- Cost: $99,751 (hull & machinery)
- Launched: 1913, as SS Santa Catalina
- Acquired: by purchase, 3 December 1917
- Commissioned: 15 May 1918
- Decommissioned: 15 August 1946
- Reclassified: AD-9, November 1920
- Honours and awards: 1 battle star (WWII)
- Fate: Transferred to Maritime Commission, 4 September 1947 Sold for scrap, 17 March 1948

General characteristics
- Type: Destroyer tender
- Displacement: 5,690 long tons (5,781 t)
- Length: 420 ft 2 in (128.07 m)
- Beam: 53 ft 10 in (16.41 m)
- Draft: 28 ft 5 in (8.66 m)
- Speed: 13 knots (24 km/h; 15 mph)
- Complement: 471
- Armament: 4 × 5 in (130 mm) guns; 1 × 3 in (76 mm) gun

USS Black Hawk (AD-9) was a destroyer tender.

== Construction and commissioning ==
Black Hawk was launched in 1913 as SS Santa Catalina by William Cramp & Sons Ship and Engine Building Co., Philadelphia; purchased by the U.S. Navy on 3 December 1917; and commissioned 15 May 1918.

== Service history ==
=== Post World War I operations ===
Assigned as tender and flagship to the Mine Force, Black Hawk departed Boston in June 1918 to take station at Inverness, Scotland. She remained there until the end of World War I and then shifted her base to Kirkwall, Orkney Islands, for the North Sea mine sweep.

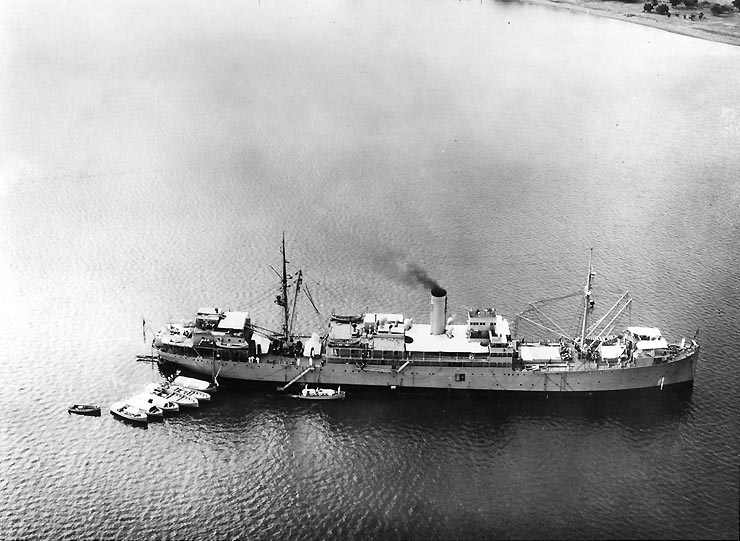
USS Black Hawk (AD-9) Anchored in Philippine waters, 19 December 1935. She serviced Destroyer Squadron Five

She returned to New York in November 1919 and served as flagship and tender for the Atlantic Fleet destroyers in reserve at Philadelphia. After the installation of a torpedo workshop and other equipment she was designated a destroyer tender (AD-9) in November 1920 and reported as flagship of the Operative Squadron, Destroyer Flotillas, Atlantic Fleet. She served mainly in Caribbean and Panamanian waters until June 1922 when she left Newport, Rhode Island, via the Suez Canal, for the Asiatic Fleet. Black Hawk remained in the Far East for twenty years during which she tended Destroyer Squadrons 5 (1922–40) and 29 (1940–42).

=== World War II ===
On 7 December 1941 Black Hawk was at Balikpapan, Borneo. She operated as a tender and repair ship at Java until 31 December 1941; at Darwin, Australia (January-3 February 1942); Java (3–20 February); and in Australian waters (26 February-29 May). Leaving Australia she steamed to Pearl Harbor, arriving 15 June 1942. She was assigned tender duty in Alaskan waters and arrived at Kodiak on 29 July 1942. Remaining there until 4 November 1942 she then returned to San Francisco, California, for repairs and overhaul.

Completing her overhaul 16 March 1943, Black Hawk returned to Alaskan waters, arriving 10 April 1943. Except for a short stay at Pearl Harbor (30 September 1943 – 1 February 1944), she remained at Adak until 21 March 1945. Following repairs at Alameda, California, she arrived at Pearl Harbor 30 May 1945; remained there until 11 September; and then proceeded to Okinawa. Black Hawk served in the Far East tending vessels at Okinawa and in China (specifically at Tsingtao) until 20 May 1946 when she headed home for the last time.

Decommissioned on 15 August 1946, she was transferred to Maritime Commission on 4 September 1947.

== Awards ==
- Victory Medal with "MOBILE BASE" clasp
- American Defense Service Medal with "FLEET" clasp
- American Campaign Medal
- Asiatic-Pacific Campaign Medal with one battle star
- World War II Victory Medal
- Navy Occupation Medal with "ASIA" clasp
- China Service Medal

== Fiction ==
USS Black Hawk was used in the Destroyermen series by Taylor Anderson. In one of the books, the USS Black Hawk was discovered by members of the "Alliance" in the book Distant Thunders where she is found marooned and laden with ammunition.
