= Zapotitlán Palmas =

- Municipality and town
- Location of the municipality in Oaxaca

- Location in Mexico
- Coordinates: 17°54′N 97°49′W
- Country: Mexico
- State: Oaxaca
- Established: 23 October 1891

Area
  - Total: 43.973 km^{2} (16.978 sq mi)

Population (2010)
  - Total: 1,514
  - Density: 34.43/km^{2} (89.17/sq mi)
- Time zone: UTC-6 (Central Standard Time)

Zapotitlán Palmas is a town and municipality in Oaxaca in south-western Mexico. The municipality covers an area of km^{2}. It is part of the Huajuapan District in the north of the Mixteca Region.
