= Santa Catarina Ticuá =

- Municipality and town
- Location in Mexico
- Coordinates: 17°04′N 97°33′W
- Country: Mexico
- State: Oaxaca
- Time zone: UTC-6 (Central Standard Time)

Santa Catarina Ticuá is a town and municipality in Oaxaca in south-western Mexico. It is part of the Tlaxiaco District in the south of the Mixteca Region.
