= Ocotepec =

Ocotepec may refer to:

== Places ==
- Ocotepec, Puebla
- Ocotepec, Chiapas
- Ocotepec, Cuernavaca, Morelos
- San Dionisio Ocotepec, Oaxaca
- San Pedro Ocotepec, Oaxaca
- Santo Tomás Ocotepec, Oaxaca
