= Santiago Nundiche =

Coordinates: 17°20′N 97°40′W

- Municipality and town
- Interactive map of Santiago Nundiche
- Country: Mexico
- State: Oaxaca
- Time zone: UTC-6 (Central Standard Time)

Santiago Nundiche is a town and municipality in Oaxaca in south-western Mexico. The municipality covers an area of km^{2}. It is part of the Tlaxiaco District in the south of the Mixteca Region.

As of 2005, the municipality had a total population of .
