= San Juan Lajarcia =

- Municipality and town
- Location in Mexico
- Coordinates: 16°30′N 95°55′W
- Country: Mexico
- State: Oaxaca

Area
  - Total: 160.75 km^{2} (62.07 sq mi)

Population (2005)
  - Total: 674
- Time zone: UTC-6 (Central Standard Time)

San Juan Lajarcia is a town and municipality in Oaxaca in south-western Mexico. It is part of the Yautepec District in the east of the Sierra Sur Region.

== Geography ==
The municipality covers an area of 160.75 km^{2} at an elevation of 900 meters above sea level. The type of climate is warm, with prevailing winds from the north. Trees include mahogany, cedar, pine and guanacaste. Fruit trees that grow in the area are sapodilla, mango, pitaya, apricots and plums. Wildlife includes deer, wild boar, anteater, raccoon, coyote, fox, skunk, bobcat, mountain lion and porcupine.

== Population ==
As of 2005, the municipality had 184 households with a total population of 674 of whom 19 spoke an indigenous language. The houses typically have dirt floors, adobe walls and tile or sheet metal roofs.

== Economy ==
The main economic activity is agriculture, growing maize, sorghum, peanuts and other crops such as beans, coffee and various fruits. Animal husbandry includes cattle, goats and pigs. Hunting and fishing is practiced for personal consumption. There is some exploitation of maguey.
