= Huajuapan District =

- District
- Oaxaca regions and districts: Mixteca to Northwest
- Coordinates: 17°48′N 97°46′W
- Country: Mexico
- State: Oaxaca

Population (2020)
  - Total: 142,652

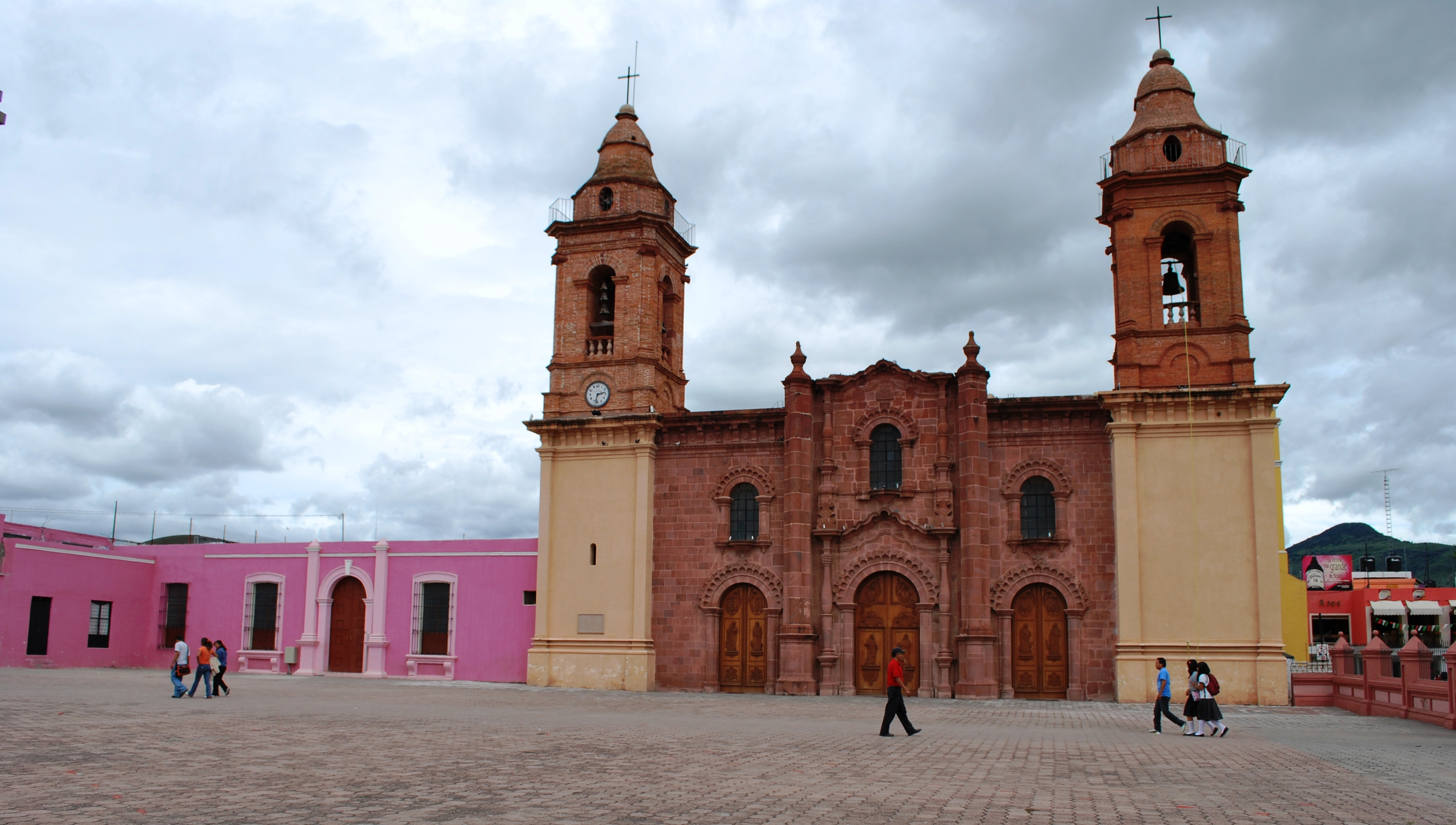
Cathedral of Huajuapan de León

Huajuapan District is located in the north of the Mixteca Region of the State of Oaxaca, Mexico. The principal city is Huajuapan de León.

== Municipalities ==
Huajuapan municipalities

The district includes the following municipalities:

Municipality code	Name	Population		Land Area			Population density	
Municipality code	Name	2020	Rank	km^{2}	sq mi	Rank	2020	Rank
004	Asunción Cuyotepeji	1,107	20	83.70	32.32	14	13/km^{2} (34/sq mi)	19
022	Cosoltepec	803	22	111.7	43.1	9	7/km^{2} (19/sq mi)	24
032	Fresnillo de Trujano	1,077	21	61.27	23.66	15	18/km^{2} (46/sq mi)	18
039	Huajuapan de León	78,313	1	325.8	125.8	2	240/km^{2} (623/sq mi)	1
055	Mariscala de Juárez	3,739	6	144.2	55.7	6	26/km^{2} (67/sq mi)	12
089	San Andrés Dinicuiti	2,308	10	99.28	38.33	10	23/km^{2} (60/sq mi)	16
160	San Jerónimo Silacayoapilla	1,429	18	58.52	22.59	17	24/km^{2} (63/sq mi)	14
164	San Jorge Nuchita	2,881	9	55.76	21.53	18	52/km^{2} (134/sq mi)	5
165	San José Ayuquila	1,629	15	21.82	8.42	26	75/km^{2} (193/sq mi)	4
181	San Juan Bautista Suchitepec	453	23	93.29	36.02	12	5/km^{2} (13/sq mi)	25
237	San Marcos Arteaga	1,568	16	127.9	49.4	7	12/km^{2} (32/sq mi)	20
245	San Martín Zacatepec	1,324	19	43.34	16.73	22	31/km^{2} (79/sq mi)	11
261	San Miguel Amatitlan	6,932	4	179.2	69.2	4	39/km^{2} (100/sq mi)	9
340	San Pedro y San Pablo Tequixtepec	1,747	11	180.2	69.6	3	10/km^{2} (25/sq mi)	21
352	San Simón Zahuatlan	4,940	5	46.09	17.80	20	107/km^{2} (278/sq mi)	2
373	Santa Catarina Zapoquila	403	25	118.3	45.7	8	2/km^{2} (6/sq mi)	26
381	Santa Cruz Tacache de Mina	2,940	7	27.55	10.64	25	107/km^{2} (276/sq mi)	3
400	Santa María Camotlán	1,713	12	95.15	36.74	11	18/km^{2} (47/sq mi)	17
455	Santiago Ayuquililla	2,904	8	89.84	34.69	13	32/km^{2} (84/sq mi)	10
456	Santiago Cacaloxtepec	1,667	14	38.70	14.94	23	43/km^{2} (112/sq mi)	7
476	Santiago Miltepec	421	24	51.75	19.98	19	8/km^{2} (21/sq mi)	23
520	Santo Domingo Tonalá	7,393	3	165.7	64.0	5	45/km^{2} (116/sq mi)	6
524	Santo Domingo Yodohino	327	26	36.43	14.07	24	9/km^{2} (23/sq mi)	22
529	Santos Reyes Yucuná	1,474	17	60.90	23.51	16	24/km^{2} (63/sq mi)	13
549	Tezoatlán de Segura y Luna	11,465	2	486.6	187.9	1	24/km^{2} (61/sq mi)	15
568	Zapotitlán Palmas	1,695	13	43.83	16.92	21	39/km^{2} (100/sq mi)	8
	Distrito Huajuapan	142,652	—	2,847	1,099.23	—	50/km^{2} (130/sq mi)	—
Source: INEGI

== See also ==
- Municipalities of Oaxaca
