= Irma Galindo =

Mexican human rights activist (born 1982)

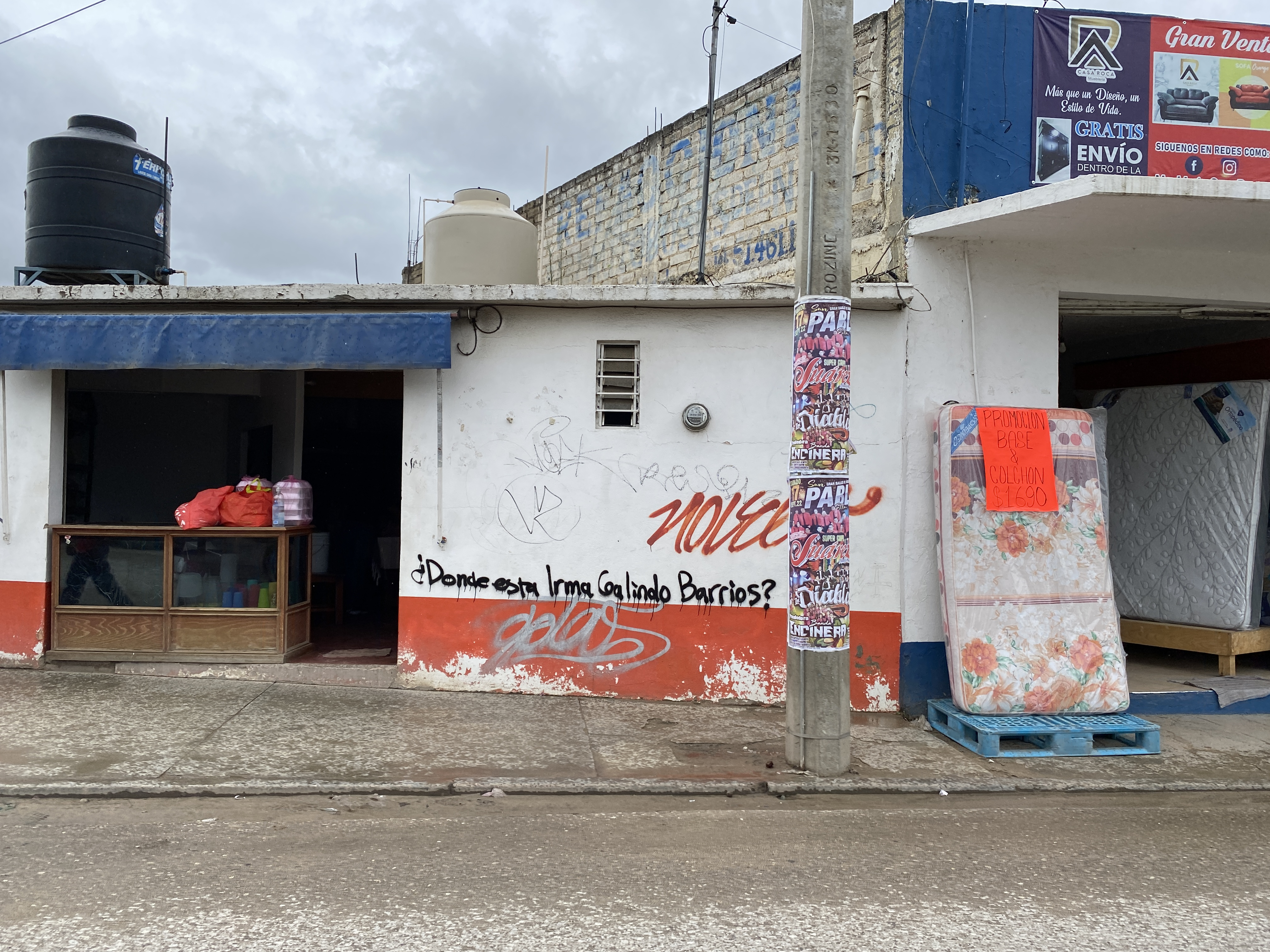
- Graffiti in Oaxaca City asking "where is Irma Galindo Barrios?"
- Born: 1 December 1982 (age 43); San Esteban Atatlahuca, Oaxaca, Mexico
- Disappeared: 27 October 2021 (aged 38); Mexico City, Mexico
- Status: Missing for 4 years, 10 months and 3 days
- Occupation: Environmental activist
- Known for: Defending forests in La Mixteca

Irma Galindo Barrios (born 1 December 1982) is a Mexican human rights activist. A member of the Mixe people, she campaigned in defence of the community's ancestral lands, including the preservation of its forests. Galindo was last seen on 27 October 2021; she has not been seen since.

== Biography ==
Galindo was born on 1 December 1982 in San Esteban Atatlahuca, Oaxaca, into a Mixe family. She worked in cultural preservation, and for a time was the municipality's councilwoman for culture, though she was later removed from her position, allegedly as a result of her activism. Galindo's notable cultural contributions included the preservation and replication of the traditional Mixe clothing of San Estaban Atatlahuaca, alongside the artisan group Mier y Terán. She made the decision for its modern interpretation to feature a deer, representing the community as the guardians of the forest.

== Activism ==
From 2018, Galindo became known for her public campaigns against logging in the Ñuu Savi forests in the La Mixteca region of Oaxaca, particularly of oak and pine trees. This included the establishment of illegal sawmills in forests in San Esteban Atatlahuca without the approval of local authorities. Galindo posted a video online in which she named the mayor of San Esteban Atatlahuca as being one of the people responsible for deforestation in the area.

As a result of her activism, Galindo began to experience intimidation and harassment, culminating with her home being set on fire. She was ostracised by much of the community in San Esteban Atatlahuca, including by members of her family. Galindo returned to the area in 2020, and continued to launch complaints with the Secretariat of Environment and Natural Resources and the National Forestry Commission.

== Disappearance ==
On 10 November 2019, Galindo had gone into hiding after receiving threats from authorities in San Esteban Atatlahuca. The National Network of Women Human Rights Defenders publicly reported on her disappearance; after 10 days, friends of Galindo confirmed she was safe but in hiding.

On 21 October 2021, Galindo travelled to Mexico City, where she visited the governing board of the Protection Mechanism for Human Rights Defenders and Journalists. On 22 October, she submitted a report to the mechanism, requesting support to help "dismantle the power mafia that is killing my people in the mountains".

On 29 October, Galindo was due to have a meeting with the Protection Mechanism; however, she failed to arrive. It was reported that she had last been seen two days earlier, on 27 October at Barranca del Muerto metro station. On 25 October, Galindo had posted on Facebook that she had attempted to attend a press conference held by the President of Mexico, Andrés Manuel López Obrador, to discuss environmental problems in her community, but had been unsuccessful in gaining entry.

Following reports of Galindo's disappearance, the National Network of Women Human Rights Defenders in Mexico stated that she had been the victim of intimidation, smear campaigns, threats, persecution, and harassment from state officials and authorities since 2018 due to her work as a forest defender. At the 2021 United Nations Climate Change Conference in Glasgow, United Kingdom in October and November 2021, signs were displayed protesting Galindo's disappearance. In November 2021, the Office of the United Nations High Commissioner for Human Rights in Mexico called on Mexican authorities to clarify the circumstances of Galindo's disappearance. Mujeres que Luchan, a collective of women human rights activists, also publicly called for authorities to quickloy locate Galindo, and held a memorial service for her in Oaxaca.

Following news of Galindo's disappearance, a pink alert was issued by the government of Oaxaca. Arturo Peimbert Calvo, the state's attorney general, stated that they were investigating several lines of enquiry, though declined to describe it as an enforced disappearance. Rogelio Bautista Barrios, the mayor of San Esteban Atatlahuca, publicly stated that Galindo was not missing but was in hiding and alleged she was doing so for attention. Galindo had previously accused Bautista of being responsible for attacks on residents of Ndoyonuyuji, including the burning of activists' homes.

In January 2022, the United Nations Committee on Enforced Disappearances issued an urgent action for Mexican authorities to locate five missing indigenous activists from San Esteban Atatlahuca: Galindo, Marco Quiroz Riaño, Donato Bautista Avendaño, Mayolo Quiroz Barrios, and Miguel Bautista Avendaño, all of whom had disappeared in October 2021.
