= San Esteban Atatlahuca =

- Municipality and town
- Location in Mexico
- Coordinates: 17°04′N 97°41′W
- Country: Mexico
- State: Oaxaca

Area
  - Total: 61.24 km^{2} (23.64 sq mi)

Population (2005)
  - Total: 3,676
- Time zone: UTC-6 (Central Standard Time)

San Esteban Atatlahuca is a town and municipality located in Oaxaca and south-western part of Mexico. The municipality covers an area of 61.24 km^{2}. It is part of the Tlaxiaco District in the south of the Mixteca Region.

As of 2005, the municipality had a total population of 3,676.

== Notable residents ==
- Irma Galindo (born 1982), human rights activist missing since 2021.
