= San Miguel El Grande =

San Miguel el Grande
- Municipality and town
- Location within Oaxaca Location within Mexico
- Coordinates: 17°37′N 97°37′W
- Country: Mexico
- State: Oaxaca

Area
  - Total: 4,705 km^{2} (1,817 sq mi)

Population (2005)
  - Total: 3,086
- Time zone: UTC-6 (Zona Centro)

San Miguel el Grande is a town and municipality in Oaxaca in southern Mexico. The municipality covers an area of 4705 km^{2}. It is part of the Tlaxiaco District in the south of the Mixteca Region.

In 2005, the municipality had a total population of 3,086. By 2020, it had risen to 4,313.
