= San Antonio Sinicahua =

- Municipality and town
- Location in Mexico
- Coordinates: 17°09′N 97°34′W
- Country: Mexico
- State: Oaxaca

Area
  - Total: 48.5 km^{2} (18.7 sq mi)

Population (2005)
  - Total: 1,298
- Time zone: UTC-6 (Central Standard Time)

San Antonio Sinicahua is a town and municipality in Oaxaca in south-western Mexico. The municipality covers an area of 48.5 km^{2}. It is part of the Tlaxiaco District in the south of the Mixteca Region.

As of 2005, the municipality had a total population of 1,298.
