= Yautepec District =

- District
- Oaxaca regions and districts: Sierra Sur towards the southwest
- Coordinates: 16°30′N 96°6′W
- Country: Mexico
- State: Oaxaca

Area
  - Land: 2,266.83 km^{2} (875.23 sq mi)

Population (2020)
  - Total: 22,727

Yautepec District is located in the east of the Sierra Sur Region of the State of Oaxaca, Mexico.

== Environment ==
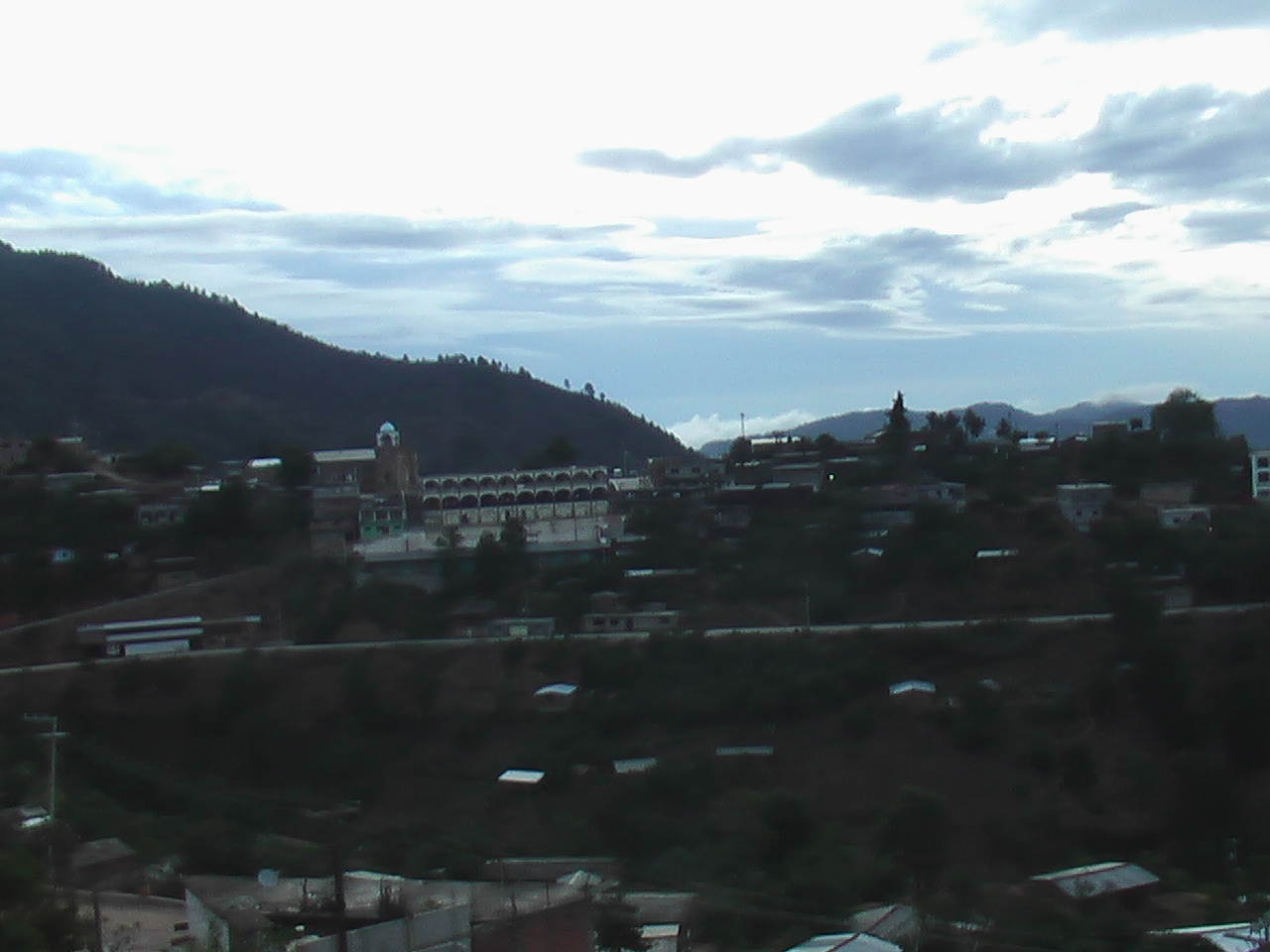
San Juan Juquila Mixes

The district lies in the eastern end of the Sierra Madre del Sur and is mountainous, with an area of 2,266.83 square kilometers. The temperature is generally temperate, warmer in the lower areas and cooler higher up, with prevalent winds from the north. Trees include mahogany, cedar, oak, guanacaste and pine. Mango, tamarind, plum, sapodilla, lemon, avocado and papaya fruits are grown. Wild fauna include wild boar, ocelots, snakes, mountain lion, coyotes and foxes.

== People ==
The total population is 22,727. Indigenous people include Zapotec, Mixe and Chontal. Economic activities include agriculture, growing maize, sorghum, peanuts, beans, coffee and various fruits. Some cattle is raised, and villagers often raise goats, sheep, and pigs. Hunting and fishing are typically practiced on a small scale for personal consumption. There is some logging activity, and the wild maguey is harvested for its juice.

== Municipalities ==
Yautepec municipalities

The district includes the following municipalities:

Municipality code	Name	Population		Land Area			Population density	
Municipality code	Name	2020	Rank	km^{2}	sq mi	Rank	2020	Rank
008	Asunción Tlacolulita	734	8	57.15	22.07	10	13/km^{2} (33/sq mi)	3
064	Nejapa de Madero	8,494	1	504.4	194.7	2	17/km^{2} (44/sq mi)	1
122	San Bartolo Yautepec	653	9	93.39	36.06	9	7/km^{2} (18/sq mi)	6
200	San Juan Juquila Mixes	3,703	2	316	122	3	12/km^{2} (30/sq mi)	5
204	San Juan Lajarcia	634	10	106.3	41.0	8	6/km^{2} (15/sq mi)	9
316	San Pedro Mártir Quiechapa	738	7	121	47	7	6/km^{2} (16/sq mi)	8
357	Santa Ana Tavela	848	5	172.3	66.5	4	5/km^{2} (13/sq mi)	11
361	Santa Catalina Quieri	825	6	156.4	60.4	6	5/km^{2} (14/sq mi)	10
074	Santa Catarina Quioquitani	456	11	38.44	14.84	11	12/km^{2} (31/sq mi)	4
410	Santa María Ecatepec	3,418	3	540.3	208.6	1	6/km^{2} (16/sq mi)	7
428	Santa María Quiegolani	2,224	4	160.7	62.0	5	14/km^{2} (36/sq mi)	2
	Distrito Yautepec	22,727	—	2,266.83	875.23	—	10/km^{2} (26/sq mi)	—
Source: INEGI
