= San Pedro Mártir Quiechapa =

- Municipality and town
- Location in Mexico
- Coordinates: 16°25′N 96°15′W
- Country: Mexico
- State: Oaxaca
- District: Yautepec District
- Elevation: 1,820 m (5,970 ft)

Population (2020)
  - Total: 738
- Time zone: UTC-6 (Central Standard Time)

San Pedro Mártir Quiechapa is a town and municipality in Oaxaca in south-western Mexico. It is part of the Yautepec District in the east of the Sierra Sur Region. The name Quiechapa in the Zapotec language means "stone woman."

== Geography ==
The municipality covers an area of 63.79 km^{2} (24.63 sq mi) at an elevation of 1,820 m (5,970 ft) above sea level in the Sierra Madre del Sur mountains. The climate is temperate, with prevailing winds from the north.

=== Flora and fauna ===
Trees include guanacaste and pine. Fruits that grow in the area are mango, sugar cane, apple, peach, avocado, orange, lemon, mamey, pomegranate and plum. Wildlife includes rabbit, deer, coyote, bobcat, boar, tepexcuintle, armadillo and mountain lion, iguana, lizard, rattlesnake and coral snake.

== Population ==
As of 2005, the municipality had 158 households with a total population of 722 of whom 36 spoke an indigenous language. Most of the houses have dirt floors, brick walls and tile roofs, although some have concrete floors and walls.

== Economy ==
The main economic activity is agriculture, growing corn, beans, wheat, coffee and fruits. Some people raise cattle, goats and poultry. Hunting and fishing is undertaken for personal consumption. There is a cottage industry producing mats and other goods from palm. The wild maguey is harvested.
