= Santa Catarina Quioquitani =

- municipality and town
- Location in Mexico
- Coordinates: 16°19′N 96°17′W
- Country: Mexico
- State: Oaxaca

Area
  - Total: 45.9 km^{2} (17.7 sq mi)
- Elevation: 2,100 m (6,900 ft)
- Time zone: UTC-6 (Central Standard Time)

Santa Catarina Quioquitani is a town and municipality in Oaxaca in south-western Mexico. It is part of the Yautepec District in the east of the Sierra Sur Region.

== Geography ==
The municipality covers an area of 45.9 km^{2} at an elevation of 2,100 meters above sea level in the Sierra Madre del Sur mountains. The climate is cool, with prevalent winds from the north. Trees include guanacastle, oak, oak, spiny cedar, mahogany and bean pod. Peach, orange, lime, loquat, guava, banana and cherry grow in the area. Wildlife include deer, tiger, coyote and fox, coral snake and iguana.

== Population ==
As of 2005, the municipality had 94 households with a total population of 439 of whom 369 spoke an indigenous language. Most people engage in agriculture, raising maize, sorghum, peanuts and other crops such as beans, coffee and various fruits. Some raise raising cattle, pigs, goats. Hunting and fishing is practiced for home consumption. There is some logging activity.
