= SS Santa Catalina =

SS Santa Catalina may refer to:

- SS Santa Catalina (1913), acquired by the United States Navy during World War I and renamed USS Black Hawk; served as a destroyer tender through the end of World War II; sold in 1947
- SS Santa Catalina (1942), a Type C2-S-B1 ship; sunk by U-129 off the coast of Georgia on 24 April 1943
