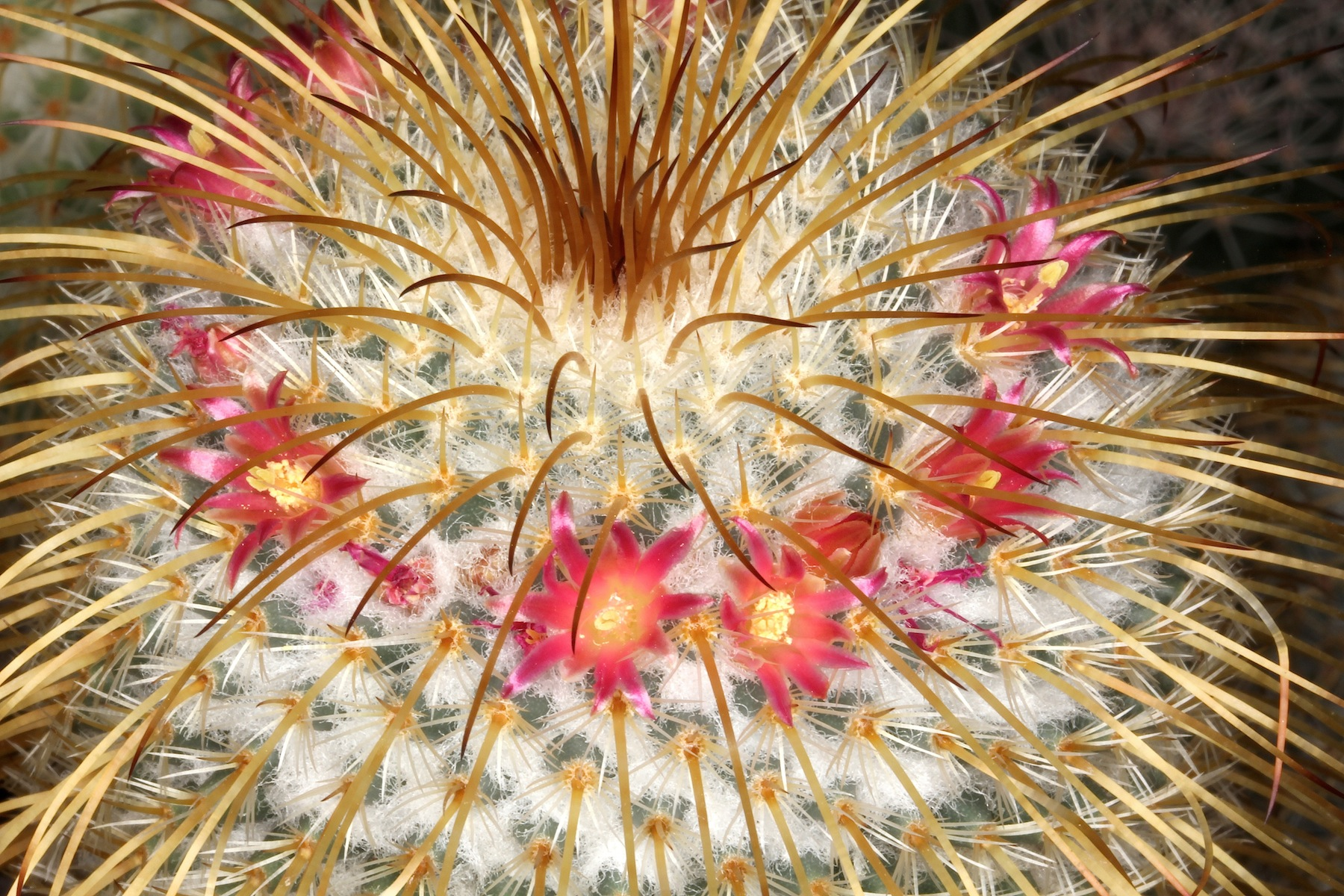

Scientific classification
- Kingdom: Plantae
- Clade: Tracheophytes
- Clade: Angiosperms
- Clade: Eudicots
- Order: Caryophyllales
- Family: Cactaceae
- Subfamily: Cactoideae
- Genus: Mammillaria
- Species: M. dixanthocentron

Binomial name
- Mammillaria dixanthocentron Backeb., 1963

= Mammillaria dixanthocentron =

Species of cactus

Mammillaria dixanthocentron is a species of cactus in the subfamily Cactoideae.
