= San Miguel Achiutla =

- Municipality and town
- Location in Mexico
- Coordinates: 17°18′N 97°29′W
- Country: Mexico
- State: Oaxaca

Area
  - Total: 59.97 km^{2} (23.15 sq mi)

Population (2005)
  - Total: 799
- Time zone: UTC-6 (Central Standard Time)

San Miguel Achiutla (Mixtec: Ñuundecu, 'place of burning things') is a town and municipality in Oaxaca in south-western Mexico. The municipality covers an area of 59.97 km^{2}. It is part of the Tlaxiaco District in the south of the Mixteca Region.

As of 2005, the municipality had a total population of 799.
