= Santa María del Rosario =

- Municipality and town
- Location in Mexico
- Coordinates: 17°21′06″N 97°35′37″W
- Country: Mexico
- State: Oaxaca
- Elevation: 2,294 m (7,526 ft)

Population (2010)
  - Municipality and town: 480
  - Urban: 55
- Time zone: UTC-6 (Central Standard Time)

Santa María del Rosario is a town and municipality in Oaxaca in south-western Mexico. The municipality covers an area of km^{2}. It is part of the Tlaxiaco District in the south of the Mixteca Region.

== Demographics ==
As of the 2010 census, the town (locality) had a population of 55 inhabitants, while the municipality for which it serves as municipal seat (cabecera municipal) had a total population of 480 inhabitants. Although the municipality is far from the least populous in Mexico (there are dozens of smaller ones in its own State of Oaxaca, and three others in the State of Sonora), its municipal seat is the smallest in all of Mexico. It is the only urban locality in the municipality.
