= Santa Catalina Quierí =

- Municipality and town
- Location in Mexico
- Coordinates: 16°19′N 96°16′W
- Country: Mexico
- State: Oaxaca

Area
  - Total: 47.21 km^{2} (18.23 sq mi)
- Elevation: 1,950 m (6,400 ft)

Population (2020)
  - Total: 825
- Time zone: UTC-6 (Central Standard Time)

Santa Catalina Quierí is a town and municipality in Oaxaca in south-western Mexico. It is part of the Yautepec District in the east of the Sierra Sur Region.

== Geography ==
The municipality covers an area of 47.21 km^{2} at an altitude of 1,950 meters above sea level in the eastern Sierra Madre del Sur. The weather is cool with prevailing winds from the north. Trees include fir, pine, oak, arbutus and willow. Peaches, custard apples, capulines, avocado, apple, lime and pomegranates grow in the area. Wildlife includes bobcats, pumas, ocelots, coyotes and foxes.

== Economy ==
As of 2005, the municipality had 220 households with a total population of 992 of whom 896 spoke an indigenous language. Economic activities include agriculture, growing maize, sorghum, peanuts and other crops such as beans, rice, coffee, tomatoes, sesame, pumpkin, peach, apple, sugar cane, avocado, plum, orange and green alfalfa. Some of the people have pigs or goats, and some hunt and fish for their own consumption. There is some logging activity.
