= Mixteca Region =

- Region
- Oaxaca regions - Mixteca in the northwest
- Coordinates: 17°48′0″N 97°46′0″W
- Country: Mexico
- State: Oaxaca
- Largest city: Huajuapan de León

Population (2020)
  - Total: 462,519

The Mixteca Region is a region in the state of Oaxaca, Mexico, part of the broader La Mixteca area which covers parts of the states of Puebla, Guerrero and Oaxaca. The region includes the districts of Juxtlahuaca, Silacayoapam, Huajuapan, Coixtlahuaca, Teposcolula, Tlaxiaco and Nochixtlán. The largest cities are Huajuapan and Tlaxiaco. According to the 2020 census the region had 452,429 people over the age of five, of which 227,680 spoke Mixteco.

== Handicrafts ==
The Mixteca produce diverse handicrafts including cups, masks, cotton and wool textiles such as towels, blankets, blouses, bags, belts, petticoats, embroidered shirts, cotton and wool shawls, reed baskets, furniture, candles, ceramics of different clays for different purposes, saddlery, rockets, knives, iron, grinding stones, brooms and fine palm hats. Women make the textiles and pottery in their free time. Men are involved in blacksmithing, carpentry, cutlery and harness making, working at home. Children begin to learn craft work about six years. Because of its importance in the regional economy, the craftsmanship of palm products deserves a special reference. Palms are used to make hats, mats, purses, toys, brooms, handbags and so on.

== Social Organization ==
The Mixtec family is basically nuclear and patrilineal, although migration has influenced the family structure as men often spend long periods away from home. Municipal authorities serve for one year only. Judicial offices are held by the trustees and mayors, who serve as prosecutors and judges. Farmlands are organized into ejidos and municipal properties, and smallholders have autonomy within these properties. The Council of Elders is important in some villages, although in others it has practically disappeared.

== See also ==
Achiutla Pre-Columbian spiritual and cultural center.
