= Santa Cruz Xoxocotlán =

City and municipality in Oaxaca, Mexico

Santa Cruz Xoxocotlán Xoxo
- Town & Municipality
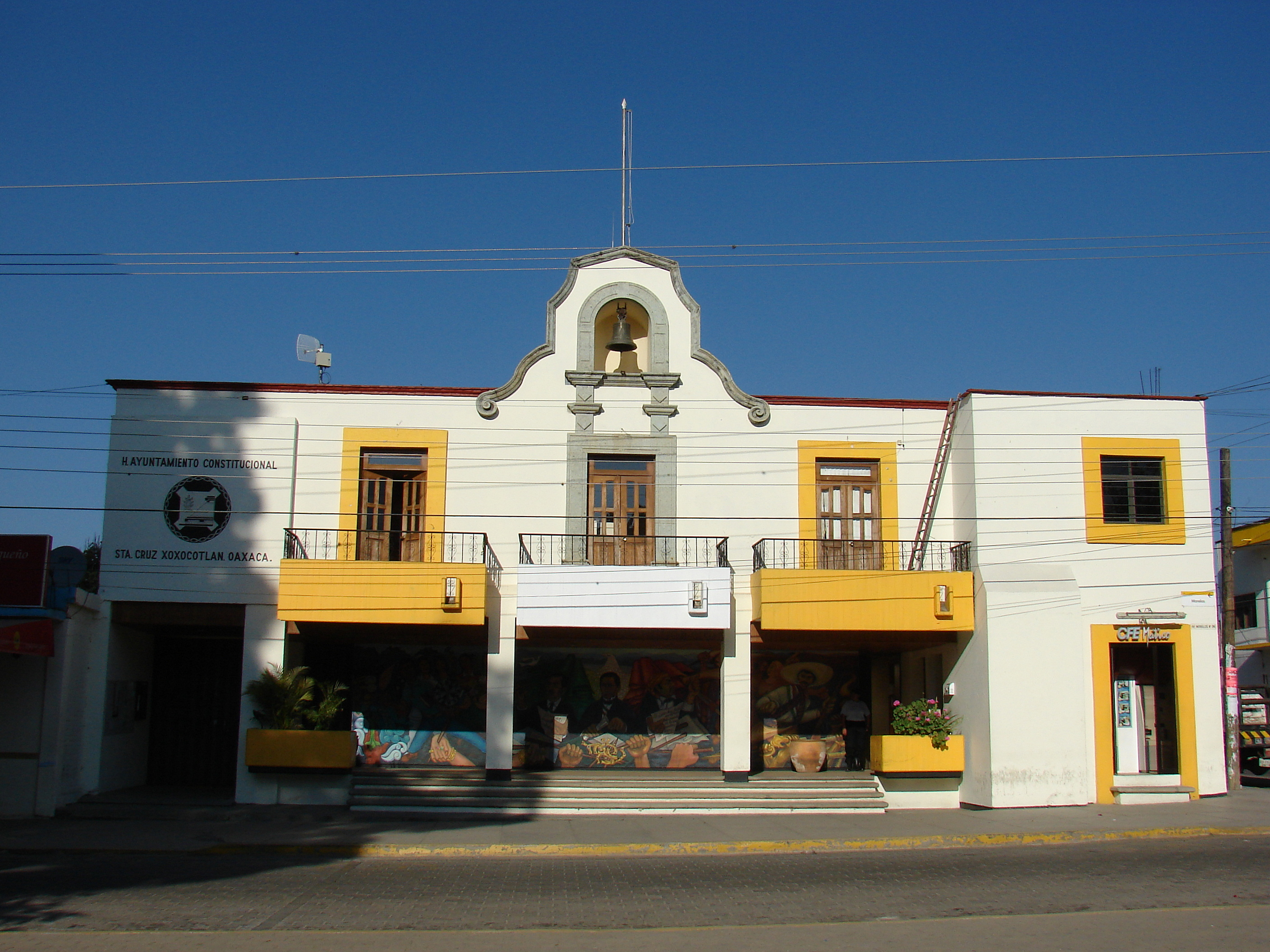
- Municipal Palace

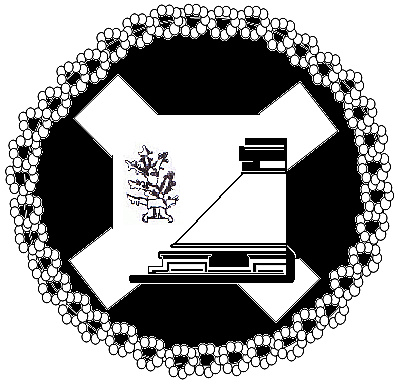
- Coat of arms

- Location within Mexico
- Coordinates: 17°01′35″N 96°44′00″W
- Country: Mexico
- State: Oaxaca

Government
  - Municipal President: NANCY NATALIA BENITEZ ZARATE

Area
  - Municipality: 76.55 km^{2} (29.56 sq mi)
- Elevation (of seat): 1,530 m (5,020 ft)

Population (2020 census)
  - Municipality: 100,402
  - Density: 1,312/km^{2} (3,397/sq mi)
  - Seat: 81,848
- Time zone: UTC-6 (Central (US Central))
- Postal code (of seat): 71230
- Area code: 951

Santa Cruz Xoxocotlán is a small city and municipality located 5 km from the state capital of Oaxaca in the south of Mexico. It is part of the Centro District in the Valles Centrales region. The name comes from the Nahuatl word “xocotl” which means “sour or sweet and sour fruit” with the duplicative “xo” to indicate “very.” The meaning of the entire phrase means “among the very sour fruits.” The Mixtec name for the area was Nuunitatnohoyoo which means “land of the moon-faced flowers.” However, the community is most commonly referred to simply as Xoxo.

For almost all of its history, the municipality had been exclusively rural; however, since the late 20th century, rapid growth of the Oaxaca city area has spurred housing developments in Xoxo, causing problems with municipal services and encroachment on the Monte Albán archeological zone. There have been efforts to preserve and promote the municipality’s ancient traditions such as “martes de brujas” (Witch Tuesdays) and local customs associated with Day of the Dead. The latter draws a significant number of tourists to observe the vigils, altars and other activities associated with this community.

== The city and municipality ==
The city of Santa Cruz Xoxocotlán is the seat and governing authority for over sixty other named localities covering a territory of 76.55 square kilometres (29.56 mi^{2}). Almost 90% of the population of the municipality (65,873 in 2005) lives in the city proper with only six other communities (Arrazola, San Francisco Javier, San Isidro Monjas, San Juan Bautista la Raya, Lomas de San Javier and El Paraíso) having a population of 700 or more. The municipality borders the municipalities of Oaxaca, Cuilapan de Guerrero, Animas Trujano, San Raymundo Jalpan, San Agustín de las Juntas, and San Pedro Ixtlahuaca. Just under 5000 people speak an indigenous language as of 2005, with most living in the rural areas outside the city. The municipality is relatively flat with the only significant elevations, Chapulin Mountain and Monte Albán, on its western edge. The main rivers through here are the Atoyac and the Nazareno. The climate is temperate with little variance in temperatures throughout the year. Flora includes pines, ocote, laurel, copal, mesquite and cactus. Wildlife mostly consists of birds, insects, and small reptiles.

Outside of the city, the municipality is still very rural with extensive agriculture; however, this employs only three percent of the population. Cultivated plants include squash, nopal, chayote, beans, corn, peas and tomatoes. Twenty six percent of the people are employed in mining, manufacturing and construction, and just under seventy percent are employed in commerce. However, much of the population is employed outside of the municipality.

The Oaxaca City airport, officially the “Aeropuerto Internacional Xoxocotlán,” (IATA code OAX) is located in this municipality and served approximately 600,000 passengers in 2008. It has one terminal, with buses and taxis to ferry passengers to Oaxaca city 12 kilometers away. Sometimes the airport is the target of protests, such as when residents of the municipality of Ozolotepec blocked the entrance to demand the dissolution of the government of Arturo Garcia.

The Instituto Tecnologico del Valle de Oaxaca (ITVO) was created in 1981 as the Instituto Tecnologico Agropecuario de Oaxaca No. 23. Its mission is to train professionals in the agricultural and forestry fields. Today, the school offers bachelors, masters and PhD’s in various fields such as Agricultural Production, Biotechnology, Natural Resources Management, Agricultural Engineering and Animal Husbandry. It has recently begun offering some non-agricultural degrees. It is located on the former Jesús Nazareno Hacienda.

The Universidades Pedagógicas Nacionales has a campus in the municipality located in the seat, offering degrees in pedagogy for teachers from primary to high school. Degrees offered range from bachelors to masters.

The community of Arrazola is known for its alebrijes made of wood. The best are made with copal wood and other wood collected from Monte Albán.

== History ==
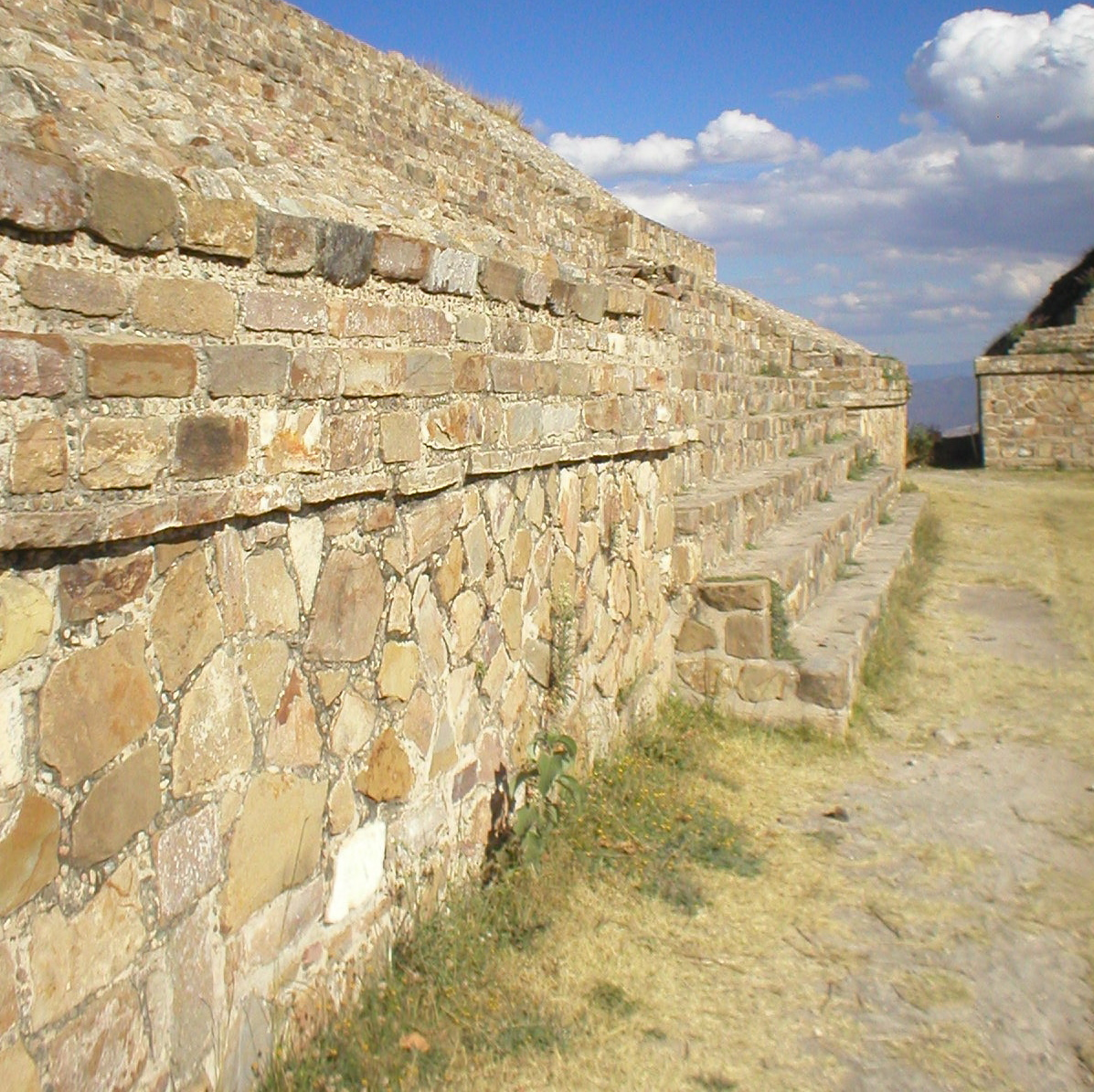
Monte Albán

According to historian Francisco Javier Clavijero, the first people to inhabit this area were Mixtecs who came from Achiutla and Tilantongo sent by a ruler named Szahuindanda in 1067 C.E. The town itself was founded about 400 years later. Archeological remains were found in 1917 over a 400-hectare area, which was declared a federal archeological zone in 1931. Despite federal regulations put into place to protect Mexican antiquities in the 19th century, many sites in Oaxaca lost valuable pieces, often due to cooperation from local authorities. Marshall Saville, the first curator of Mexican and Central American anthropology at the American Museum of Natural History in New York, for example, excavated at Xoxocotlán, with permission from the government in the late 1890s, resulting in AMNH’s collection of Oaxacan artifacts.

The area was very rural until the late 20th century, with electricity and piped water introduced in the 1960s and paved roads in the 1980s. Near the end of the 20th century, however, the municipality had begun to grow rapidly due to its proximity to the city of Oaxaca. This has led to the rapid construction of subdivisions and other housing, which has caused problems. The two main problems have been the municipality’s inability to keep up with public services such as water, sewer, and pavement to the new housing divisions, and pressure on the Monte Albán archeological site. Protests to demand services such as water and paving have occurred, some of which have involved blocking the entrances to the town. Some protests have involved violence. Three municipal policemen were held for six hours when the municipal palace was taken over by APPO in 2008. The confrontation was over the expropriation of land in the San Antonio Arrazola neighborhood to be used as a secondary school and the mismanagement of municipal funds. In February 2010, a group of residents tried to take over the municipal palace. Approximately, 300 people, mostly merchants, headed by Emilio Zarante Vasquez gathered, accusing the municipal government of the mismanagement of government funds and repression. The attempt was not successful. In 2000 and 2009, houses built on and next to the Monte Albán site have been expropriated and/or simply destroyed in order to protect the archeological zone.

== Culture ==
=== Celebrations and commemorations ===
Saints’ days in the municipality are celebrated by events called “calendas” which generally last for three days and includes activities such as concerts, amusement rides, fireworks, traditional and popular dances and more. Twelve lay religious leaders called “mayordomos” are selected each year to lead neighborhood celebrations such as saints’ days. These mayordomos work together for major festivals such as the “holy burial of Christ,” the “Triumph of the Cross, “Guelaguetza” and others. The responsibilities of these mayordomos revolve around fundraising and organization. Saint Helena, called Santa Elena de la Cruz locally, is considered to be the patron saint of the municipality, whose day is celebrated on 18 August. Traditional dances include the Danza de la Pluma (Feather Dance) and the Danza de los Viejitos (Dance of the Old Persons). For the latter, dancers imitate known persons in the community, with their faces hidden behind masks to keep identities secret. Dances are accompanied by live musicians playing “sones” and other regional music. In the markets and restaurants one can find mole negro, chichilo, higaditos, mole coloradito, Cegueza, pipian, atole, tepache and mezcal. A dish prepared for Day of the Dead is called pletatamal, which is of Mixtec origin and dates back to the Monte Albán era.

Traditional funeral rites include “tapetes de arena” (sand carpets) and the “levantada de cruz” (raising of the cross). Wakes are still generally held in the home of the deceased. In the past, the deceased was laid on the dirt floor with his head resting on a brick and a cross drawn in lime on the ground above the head. After the burial, a novena is said and after the nine days of prayers, a “carpet” of colored sand is created with religious images and a depiction of the Twelve Passions of Christ. After more prayers, this carpet, along with the cross drawn in lime or flower petals is brought to the grave of the deceased at midnight to be deposited. The next morning, final goodbyes are said.

The two most important celebrations held in the municipality are “martes de brujas” or Witch Tuesdays and Day of the Dead. Tuesdays during Lent are called the “martes de brujas” or Witch Tuesdays. On these days, tamales with panela cheese are sold along with atole. The fourth Friday of Lent is called the Friday of the Samaritan, which is celebrated in the atrium of the town church with the sounds of bells, music and fireworks. The event ends with Mass. Lent ends with Holy Week, which includes a Passion Play. The fourth Tuesday in Lent has been host to an annual musical event called the Martes de Brujas since 2005. In 2009, the event included groups such as Sonora Santanera, the Dueto de Cuerdas de Oaxaca, El Grupo de Danzón and Lizet Santiago. The tradition of “Witch Tuesdays” dates back to the colonial period when Friar Domingo de Santamaría promoted the construction of a church with volunteers working nights. Women would come to offer tamales and atole to the volunteers, lighting their way with a type of lamp called a “bruja”, which contained a candle protected by paper shields. The consumption of tamales on these Tuesdays has been practiced since the 1970s. Cultural events began to accompany the ritual.

During the month of October, the Virgin of the Rosary is celebrated with an event called the Rosario de Aurora, starting from the 3rd of October and ending with the beginning of Day of the Dead ceremonies on the 31st of October. Day of the Dead commemorations extend from 31 October to 2 November and even the poorest in the municipality save money in order to adorn graves with flowers and offer cigarettes, mole, chocolate and other things. The municipality is one of several in the area that receives a significant number of tourists during Day of the Dead, with more than 30,000 in 2005.

Day of the Dead altars are set up starting on 30 October and Mexican marigold petals are laid from these altars, through the entrances of houses out to the street. Many altars here are decorated with many of the same items that were used on ancient Zapotec tombs of Monte Albán. Most of these altars have three levels, referring to heaven, purgatory and hell but sometimes they have seven, reflecting the Zapotec cosmos. From this point until 2 November, nothing on the altar may be touched so as to not anger the visiting dead. On the nights of 31 October and 1 November, vigils are held in cemeteries in the municipality, especially the cemeteries of Mictlancihuatl and San Sebastian Martir. Those who have loved ones buried in the local cemeteries decorate the tombs with flower petals, candles, ceramic skulls and other items and maintain nightly vigils from about 5 or 6 in the evening until the next morning, with food and drink to sustain them. Prayers are traditionally said at about 11pm until about 3, so that the dead may return to the beyond in peace.

On the morning of 31 October, graves are cleaned and decorated. On 31 October, exactly at 3pm, church bells ring a chorus called “Los Angelitos” (little angels) and braziers with copal burn by the altars. This is to welcome the souls of the deceased children who come to visit until 3pm the next day. On the 31st at 11pm at the Church of Santa Elena de la Cruz, a procession with an image of San Sebastian winds through the streets to the Panteon Antiguo (Old Cemetery) where the first chapel built for the community was constructed in the 17th century. Here candles, prayers and songs are offered for all the dead. This event attracts hundreds of visitors as well as the local populace. The Chapel of San Sebastian was originally built between 1535 and 1555 of adobe, reed and thatch in what is now the Panteon Antiguo of Xoxocotlan. The current structure was built in the mid 17th century and consecrated in 1657 of green stone. This chapel appears in the oldest known map of Monte Albán, which was created in 1606. Over time, this church was abandoned and the area around it, which already had graves, became the first cemetery.

On 1 November, more copal is burned and “Los Angelitos” play again at 3pm to bid farewell to the children and to welcome the arrival of the adults. At 10pm, in the center of the San Sebastian cemetery, a Catholic brotherhood known as “La Capilla” holds a prayer service accompanied by Latin chants. On 2 November, the altars are dismantled and the offerings are shared among family and friends as the adult dead return to “mucu amm” or the underworld in Mixtec, which is located in the center of the Earth.

The traditions associated with Witch Tuesdays and Day of the Dead have been actively promoted by the municipal government since the 2000s. One reason for this is to promote tourism and the other is to counter foreign influences such as Halloween. In addition to encouraging the old practices associated with these events, the municipality has sponsored cultural events to accompany them, such as musical, gastronomical and other cultural events which attract both residents and visitors from the Oaxaca city area. In 2005, the municipality created the largest Day of the Dead altar ever constructed here in the attempt to create a Guinness Record. It measured 65 meters long, 4.5 meters high decorated with 7 tons of flowers, 3,000 oranges, 2,500 bananas and 5,000 apples. The altar was surrounded by numerous “sand carpets,” such as those associated with traditional funerals, most with Christian themes but also including one depicting the pre-Hispanic belief of a route to the land of the dead.
