= Santa María del Tule =

Santa María del Tule Tule
- Town & Municipality
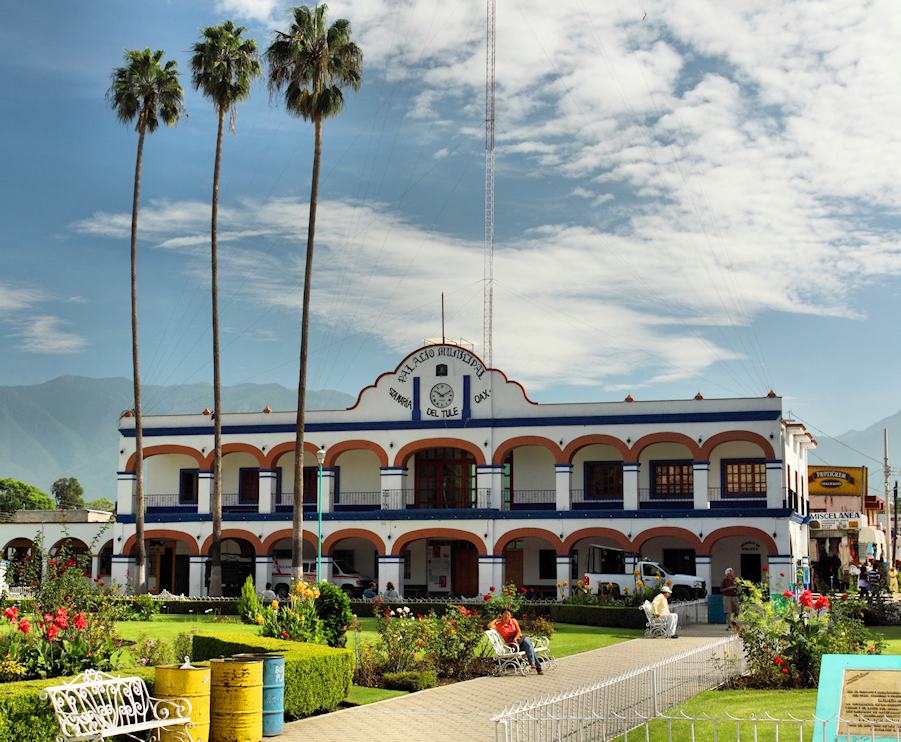
- Santa Maria del Tule's town hall

- Location in Mexico Santa María del Tule (Mexico)
- Coordinates: 17°02′50″N 96°38′00″W
- Country: Mexico
- State: Oaxaca

Government
  - Municipal President: Pedro Cortes Raymundo 2008-2010

Area
  - Municipality: 25.2 km^{2} (9.7 sq mi)
- Elevation (of seat): 1,565 m (5,135 ft)

Population (2005) Municipality
  - Municipality: 8,259
  - Seat: 7,831
- Time zone: UTC-6 (Central (US Central))

Santa María del Tule is a town and a municipality in the Mexican state of Oaxaca. It is part of the Centro District in the Valles Centrales region. It is located 11 kilometers (6.8 mi) SE of the city of Oaxaca on Highway 190. The town and municipality are named for the patron saint of the place, the Virgin Mary and “Tule” comes from the Náhuatl word “tulle” or “tullin” which means bulrush.

The town's claim to fame is as the home of a 2,000-year-old Montezuma cypress tree, known as the El Árbol del Tule, which is one of the oldest, largest and widest trees in the world. Its gnarled trunk and branches are filled with shapes that have been given names such as “the elephant,” “the pineapple” and even one called “Carlos Salinas’ ears.”

== History ==
The municipality of Santa María del Tule used to be a lake surrounded by marshes which included cypress trees. This marsh was also filled with bulrushes which accounts for part of the town's name. The population of Tule had made their living since pre-Hispanic times extracting and processing lime (calcium oxide) for sale in the city of Oaxaca. In 1926, much of the municipality was made ejido land, and much of the population became farmers, growing corn, beans, chickpeas and alfalfa, mostly during the rainy season in the summer.

Over the centuries, the area has dried with the lake and marshes gone. More recently, increased urbanization and irrigated farming has put pressure on aquifers here. During the dry season, the water table decreases more than six meters. This drop in water tables threatens the survival of the remaining cypress trees in the area.

== The town ==
The small town of Santa María del Tule appears to be built around one particularly large cypress tree with its crafts market, church and town plaza all next to it. The La Guadalupana Market serves traditional Oaxacan dishes of the area including barbacoa and empanadas de Amarillo. The area is also noted for its ice cream which includes flavors such as cactus fruit, leche quemada (literally burnt milk) as well as specialties known as Beso de Angel (angel kiss) and Beso Oaxaqueño (Oaxacan kiss).

The town's Baroque-style church is called El Templo de Santa María de la Asunción (Temple of the Virgin Mary of the Assumption) and dates from the 18th century. The interior is graced by a number of very fine pre-colonial santos (statues of saints), many executed in a sumptuous polychrome and beautifully preserved. It was built of stone over an ancient pagan shrine, and is surrounded by other buildings and areas belonging to the parish. A large walled plaza lies in front of the church.

Major celebrations here include Candelaria on 2 February, the Feast of the Assumption of Mary on 15 August and the Festival of the Tule Tree on the second Monday of October.

== The Tule Tree ==
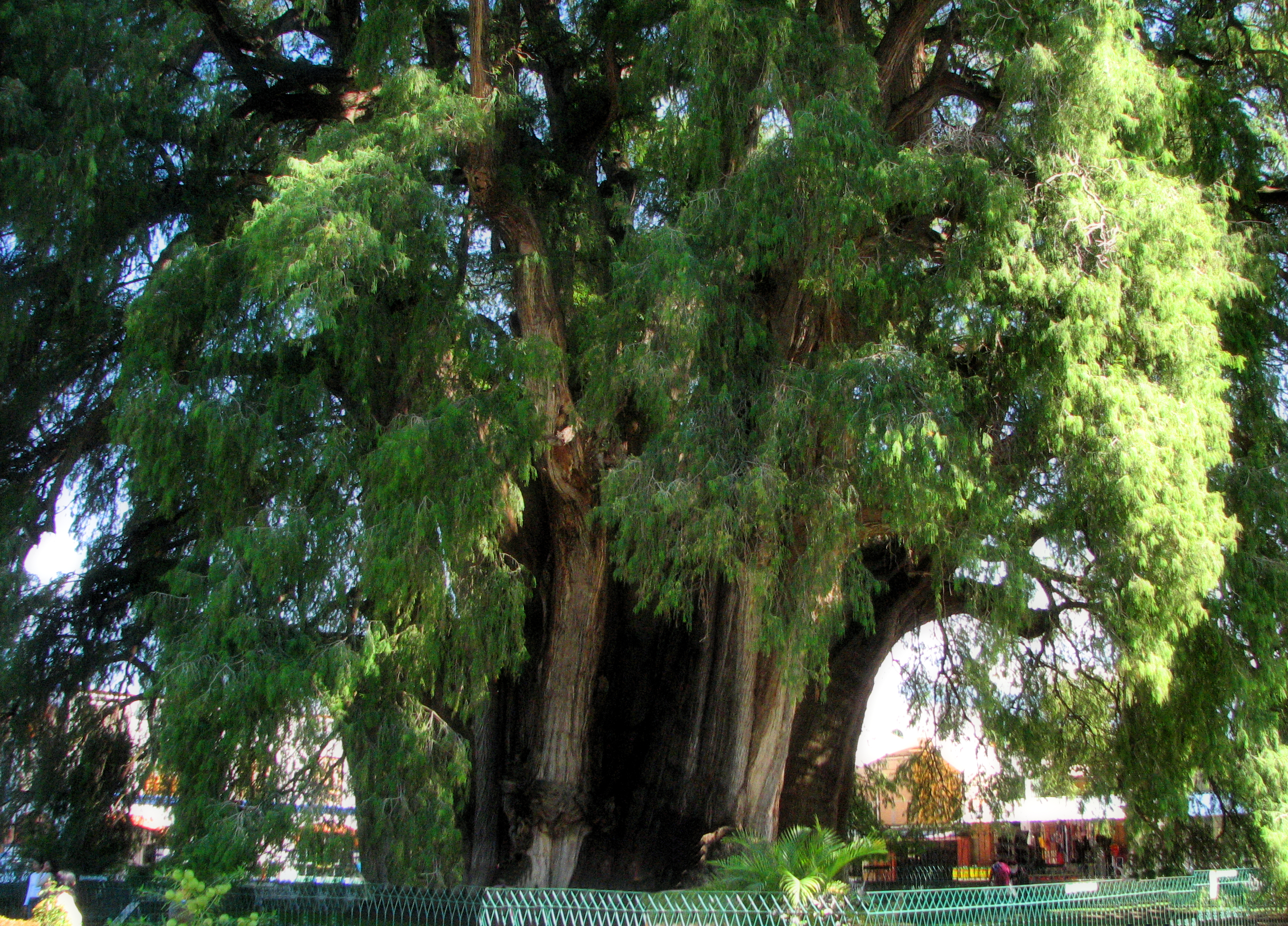
Tule Tree

This tree is one of a number of old Montezuma cypress (Taxodium mucronatum) trees that grow in the town. This particular tree is found in the town's center growing in both the town's main plaza and the atrium of the church of Santa María de la Asunción.

The tree is one of the oldest and largest in the world and has the widest girth. It has an age of at least 2,000 years, with its existence chronicled by both the Aztecs and the Spanish that founded the city of Oaxaca. It has a height of forty meters, a volume of between 700 and 800 m^{3} (25,000 and 28,000 cu ft), an estimated weight of 630 tons and a circumference of about forty meters. The trunk is so wide that thirty people with arms extended joining hands are needed to encircle it. The tree dwarfs the town's main church and is taller than its spires, and it is still growing.

To the indigenous peoples of this area, the tree was sacred. According to Mixtec myth, people originated from cypress trees, which were considered sacred and a genus. This particular tree was the site of a ritual which included the sacrifice of a dove and was realized for the last time in 1834. According to Mixe myth, the origin of this particular tree is the walking stick of a god or a king by the name of Conday, who stuck his walking stick, supposedly weighing 62 kg (137 lb), into the ground on which he rested. From that point on, the tree began to grow, and according to the king version of the story, the king died the same day the tree began to grow. The tree has gnarled branches and trunk, and various local legends relate to what appear to be animals and other shapes growing in the tree. Today, these forms have names such as “the elephant,” “the lion,” “the Three Kings,” “the deer”, “the pineapple,” “the fish,” “the squirrel’s tail” and “Carlos Salinas’ ears.” Local guides point out the shapes using pocket mirrors to reflect the sun.

This kind of cypress is known in Spanish as a sabino, in Nahuatl as an ahuehuete and in Zapotec as Yagaguichiciña, and it is Mexico's national tree. This particular tree was photographed for the first time by Désiré Charney in 1856 and was described and measured by José Acosta in “Historia Natural y Moral de las Indias” in 1856. The tree has been nominated by SEMARNAP as the most notable tree in Oaxaca, and is listed with the Lista Indicative del Patrimonio de Mexico (Indicative List of the Patrimony of Mexico).

The tree was in danger of drying out in the late 19th century but since then it has been regularly watered.

== The municipality ==
As municipal seat, Tule has governing authority over the following communities: Güendulain, Kilómetro Dieciséis Punto Cinco, and Paraje el Corralito, which cover an area of 25.2 km^{2} (9.7 sq mi). The total population of the municipality is 8,259, of which 7,831 or 95% live in the town proper. The municipality borders the municipalities of Tlalixtac de Cabrera, Rojas de Cuauhtémoc, San Francisco Lachigoló, Teotitlán del Valle and Santa Cruz Amilpas. The main river here is the Atoyac and the area has a mild climate with little seasonal variation in temperatures. Vegetation is principally mesquite and leucaena as well as the famous cypress trees in the municipal seat. Animal life is mostly small mammals such as the red squirrel, field mouse and opossum and birds such as the buzzard and duck.

The main economic base is tourism based on the Tule tree, employing nearly 75% of the municipality's population. The main agriculture product today is the guava fruit, with some corn and beans still grown, but this employs only nine percent of the population. Some processing of the guava fruit occurs here, as well as crafts such as pottery.
