= San Antonio de la Cal =

- Municipality and town
- Location in Mexico
- Coordinates: 17°02′N 96°42′W
- Country: Mexico
- State: Oaxaca

Area
  - Total: 11 km^{2} (4.2 sq mi)
  - Town: 4.04 km^{2} (1.56 sq mi)

Population (2020 census)
  - Total: 26,282
  - Density: 2,400/km^{2} (6,200/sq mi)
  - Town: 24,419
  - Town density: 6,040/km^{2} (15,700/sq mi)
- Time zone: UTC-6 (Central Standard Time)

San Antonio de la Cal is a town and municipality in Oaxaca in southeastern Mexico and is the fifth most densely populated municipality in Oaxaca; only four Oaxacan municipalities are more densely populated than it: Oaxaca, San Jacinto Amilpas, Santa Lucía del Camino, and Santa Cruz Amilpas. The municipality covers an area of 11 km^{2}. It is part of the Centro District in the Valles Centrales region. As of 2005, the municipality had a total population of 15,071.
