= Amilpas =

Amilpas may refer to:

- San Jacinto Amilpas, Oaxaca
- Santa Cruz Amilpas, Oaxaca
- Zacualpan de Amilpas, Morelos
