= Centro District =

- District
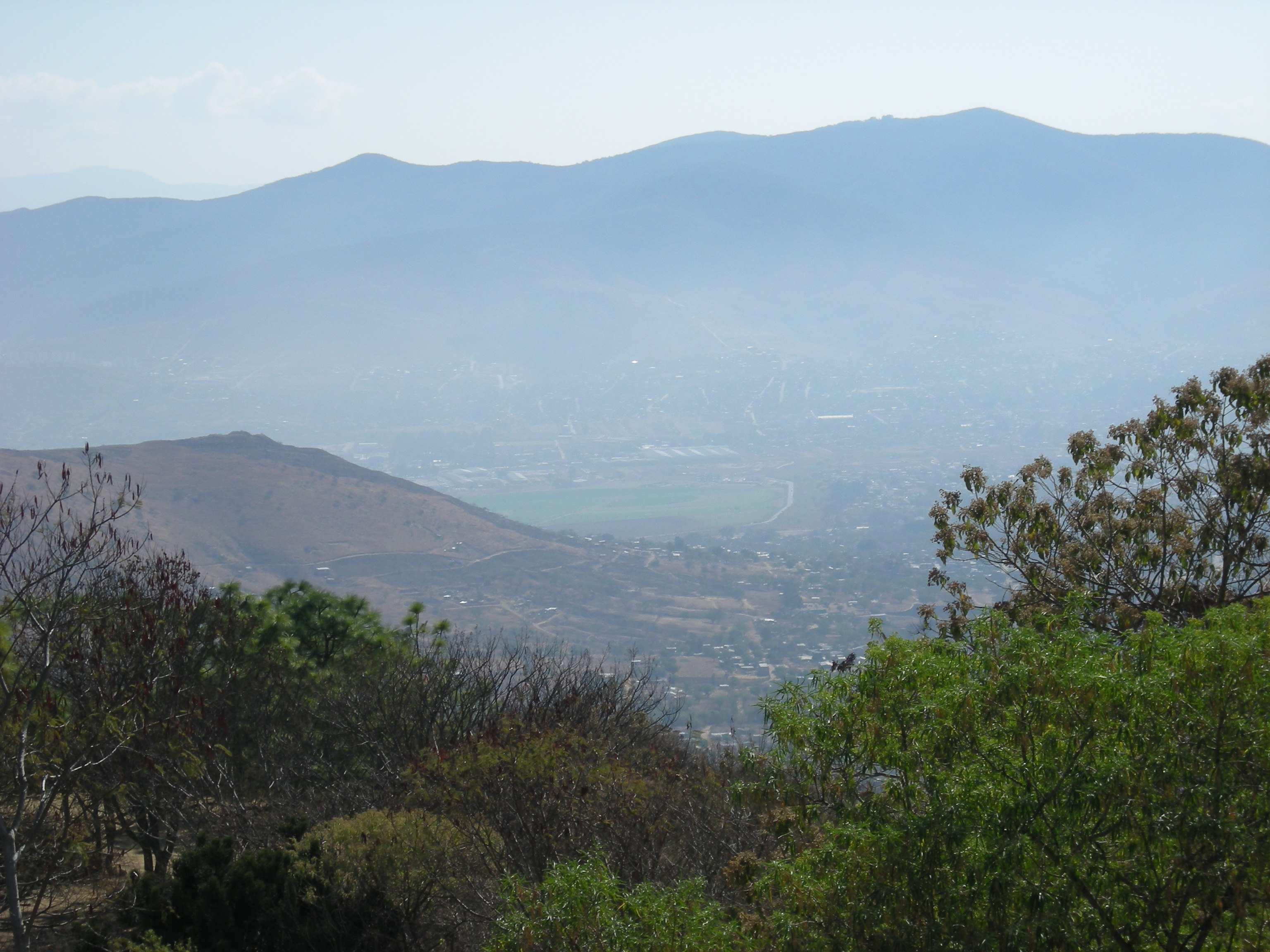
- View of the Valley of Oaxaca from Monte Alban

- Oaxaca regions and districts: Valles Centrales de Oaxaca in center
- Coordinates: 17°4′N 96°41′W
- Country: Mexico
- State: Oaxaca

Population (2020)
  - Total: 649,891

Centro District is located in the Valles Centrales Region of the State of Oaxaca, Mexico. The district includes the state capital Oaxaca and satellite towns. The district has an average elevation of 1,550 meters. The climate is mild, with average temperatures ranging from 16°C in winter to 25°C in spring.

== Municipalities ==
The district includes the following municipalities:

Municipality code	Name	Population		Land Area			Population density	
Municipality code	Name	2020	Rank	km^{2}	sq mi	Rank	2020	Rank
174	Ánimas Trujano	4,564	17	3.020	1.166	20	1,511/km^{2} (3,914/sq mi)	8
023	Cuilapan de Guerrero	26,882	5	49.80	19.23	3	540/km^{2} (1,398/sq mi)	13
067	Oaxaca de Juárez	270,955	1	89.53	34.57	1	3,026/km^{2} (7,838/sq mi)	4
083	San Agustín de las Juntas	11,391	12	25.99	10.03	10	438/km^{2} (1,135/sq mi)	16
087	San Agustín Yatareni	5,521	16	6.397	2.470	18	863/km^{2} (2,235/sq mi)	10
091	San Andrés Huayapam	6,279	15	27.58	10.65	9	228/km^{2} (590/sq mi)	18
092	San Andrés Ixtlahuaca	1,776	21	28.81	11.12	8	61/km^{2} (159/sq mi)	21
107	San Antonio de la Cal	26,282	6	11	4.2	13	2,389/km^{2} (6,188/sq mi)	5
115	San Bartolo Coyotepec	10,391	13	31.37	12.11	5	331/km^{2} (858/sq mi)	17
157	San Jacinto Amilpas	16,287	8	4.156	1.605	19	3,919/km^{2} (10,150/sq mi)	3
310	San Pedro Ixtlahuaca	14,552	9	23.17	8.95	11	628/km^{2} (1,627/sq mi)	11
342	San Raymundo Jalpan	4,105	18	8.220	3.174	15	499/km^{2} (1,293/sq mi)	15
350	San Sebastián Tutla	16,878	7	7.329	2.830	16	2,303/km^{2} (5,964/sq mi)	6
375	Santa Cruz Amilpas	13,200	10	2.274	0.878	21	5,805/km^{2} (15,034/sq mi)	1
385	Santa Cruz Xoxocotlán	100,402	2	43.86	16.93	4	2,289/km^{2} (5,929/sq mi)	7
390	Santa Lucía del Camino	50,362	3	9.437	3.644	14	5,337/km^{2} (13,822/sq mi)	2
399	Santa María Atzompa	41,921	4	31.30	12.08	6	1,339/km^{2} (3,469/sq mi)	9
403	Santa María Coyotepec	3,751	19	6.539	2.525	17	574/km^{2} (1,486/sq mi)	12
409	Santa María del Tule	8,939	14	16.80	6.49	12	532/km^{2} (1,378/sq mi)	14
519	Santo Domingo Tomaltepec	3,386	20	30.54	11.79	7	111/km^{2} (287/sq mi)	20
553	Tlalixtac de Cabrera	12,067	11	81.53	31.48	2	148/km^{2} (383/sq mi)	19
	Distrito Centro	649,891	—	539	208.11	—	1,184/km^{2} (3,066/sq mi)	—
Source: INEGI

=== Largest cities ===
Largest cities or towns in Centro Distric Source:
Rank		Municipality	Pop.
1	Oaxaca de Juárez	Oaxaca de Juárez	258,913
2	Santa Cruz Xoxocotlán	Santa Cruz Xoxocotlán	81,848
3	Santa Lucía del Camino	Santa Lucía del Camino	45,895
4	Santa María Atzompa	Santa María Atzompa	28,586
5	San Antonio de la Cal	San Antonio de la Cal	24,419
6	San Jacinto Amilpas	San Jacinto Amilpas	16,827
7	Cuilapan de Guerrero	Cuilapan de Guerrero	15,763
8	Santa Cruz Amilpas	Santa Cruz Amilpas	13,200
9	Tlalixtac de Cabrera	Tlalixtac de Cabrera	11,400
10	San Sebastián Tutla	San Sebastián Tutla	11,074

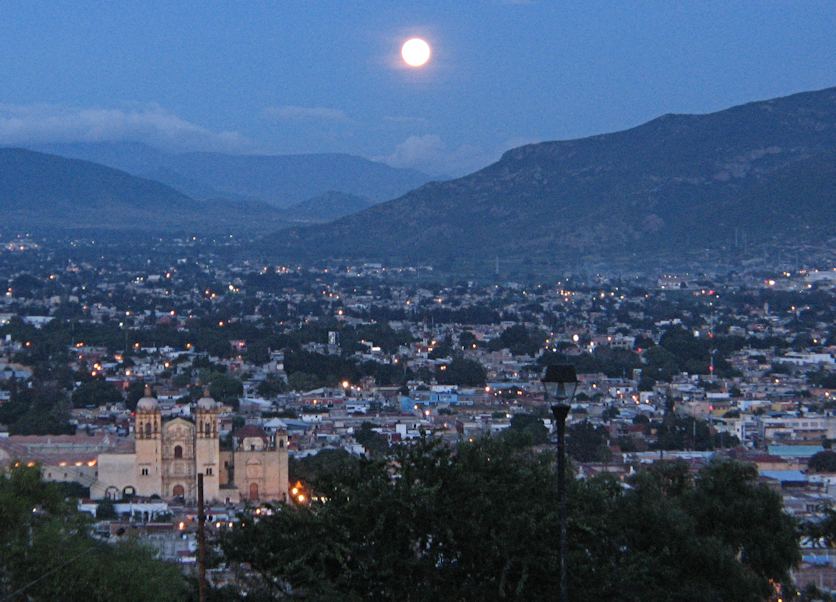
A view of city of Oaxaca de Juarez from the Cerro de Fortín

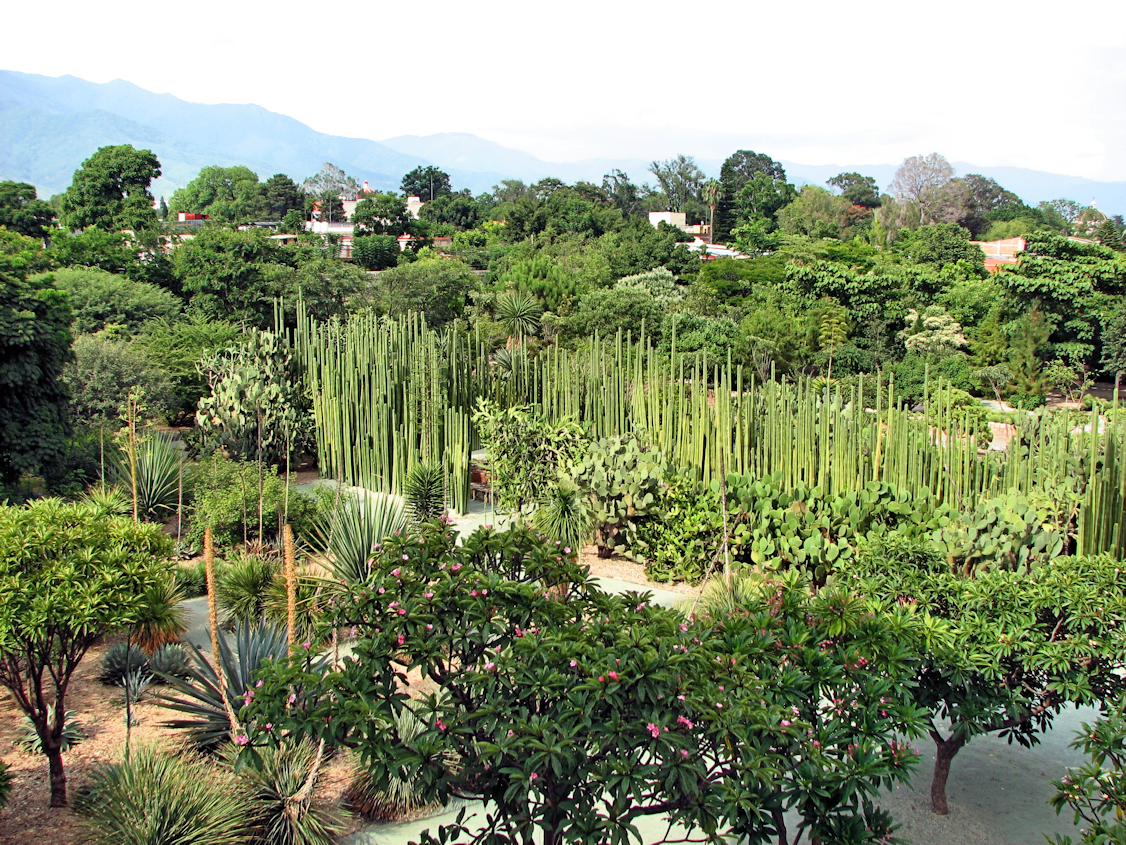
Ethnobotanical Garden at the Temple of Santo Domingo

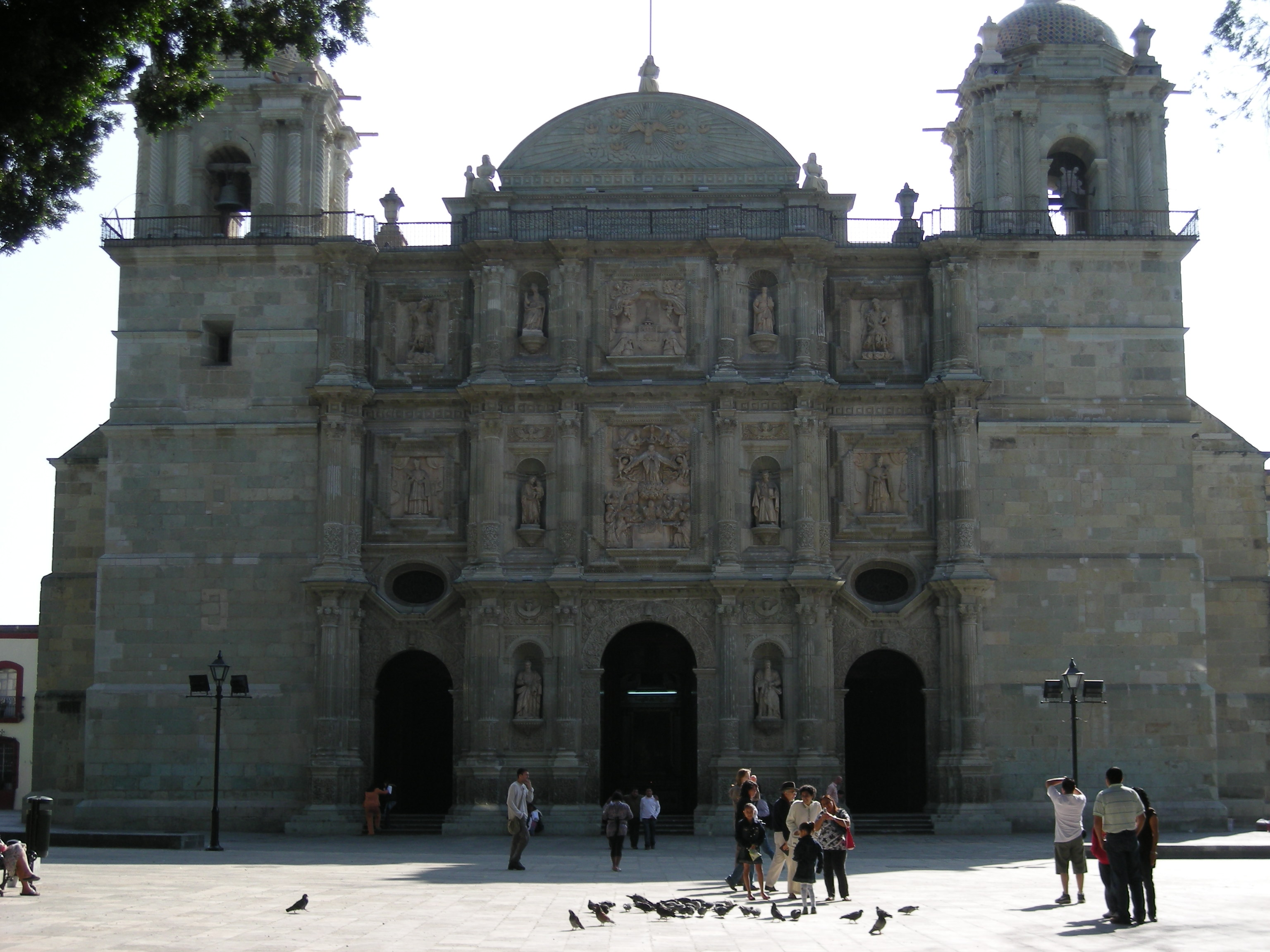
Cathedral of Our Lady of the Assumption, Oaxaca

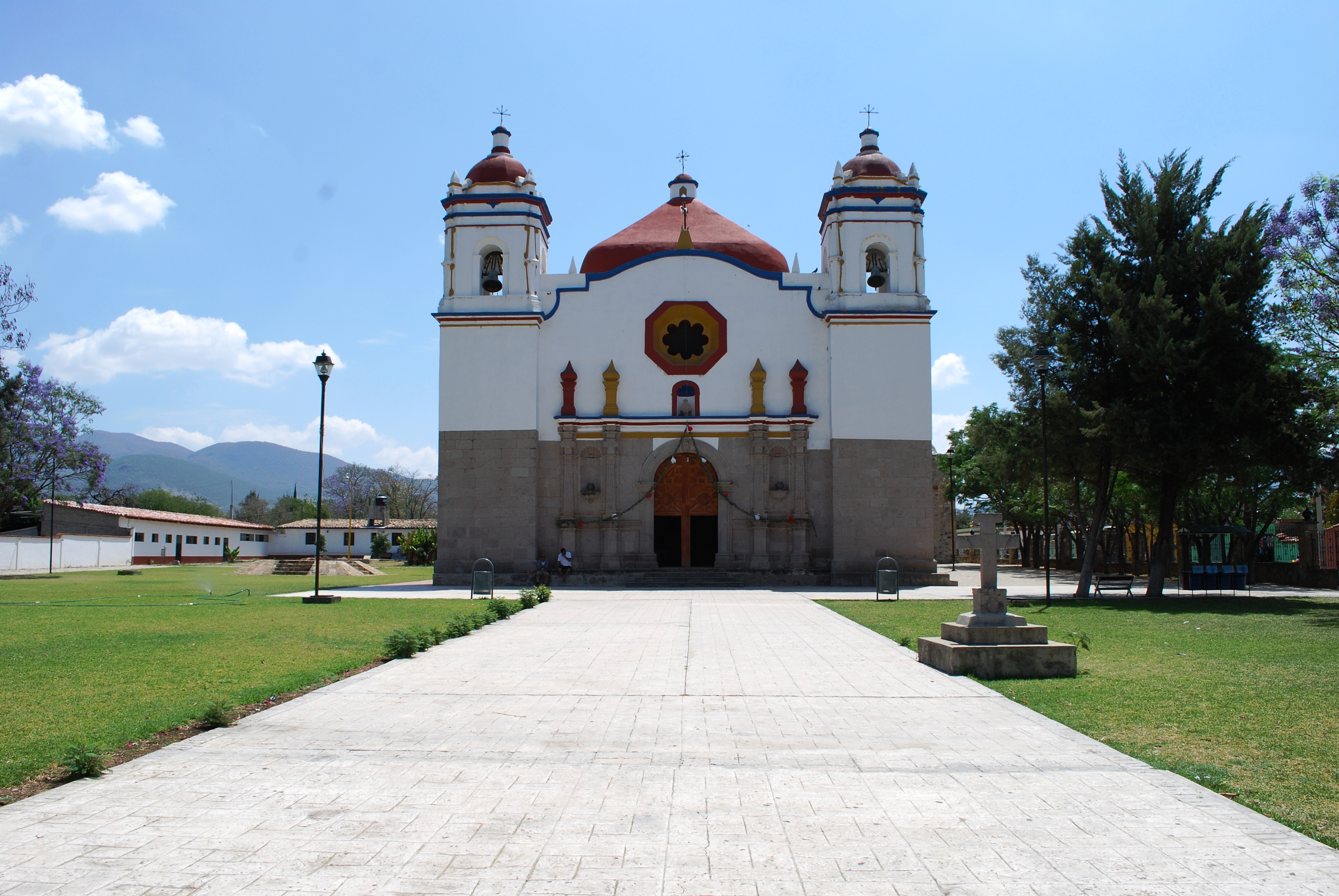
Church of San Bartolo with remains of pyramids to the left

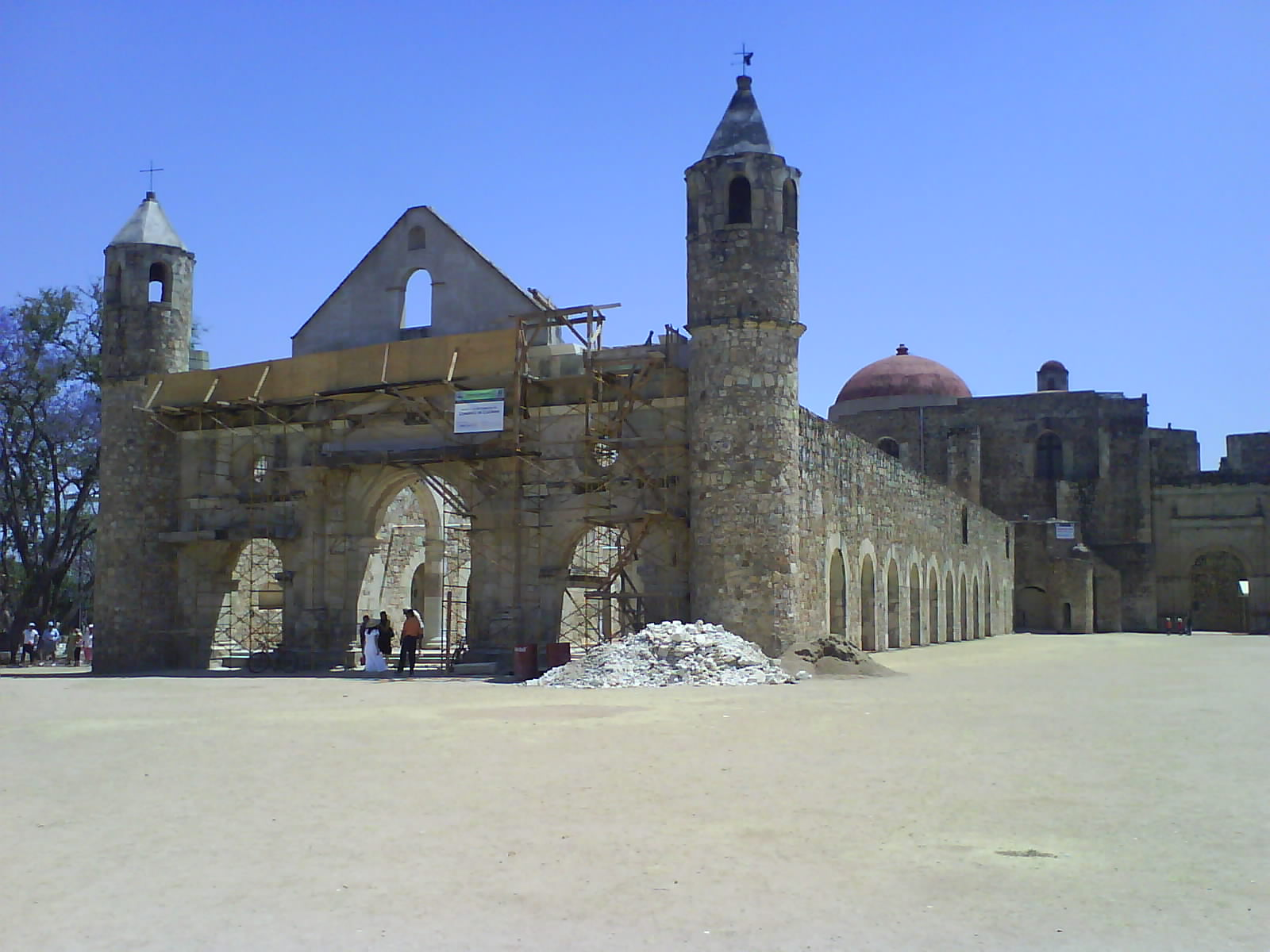
Basilica of Cuilapan

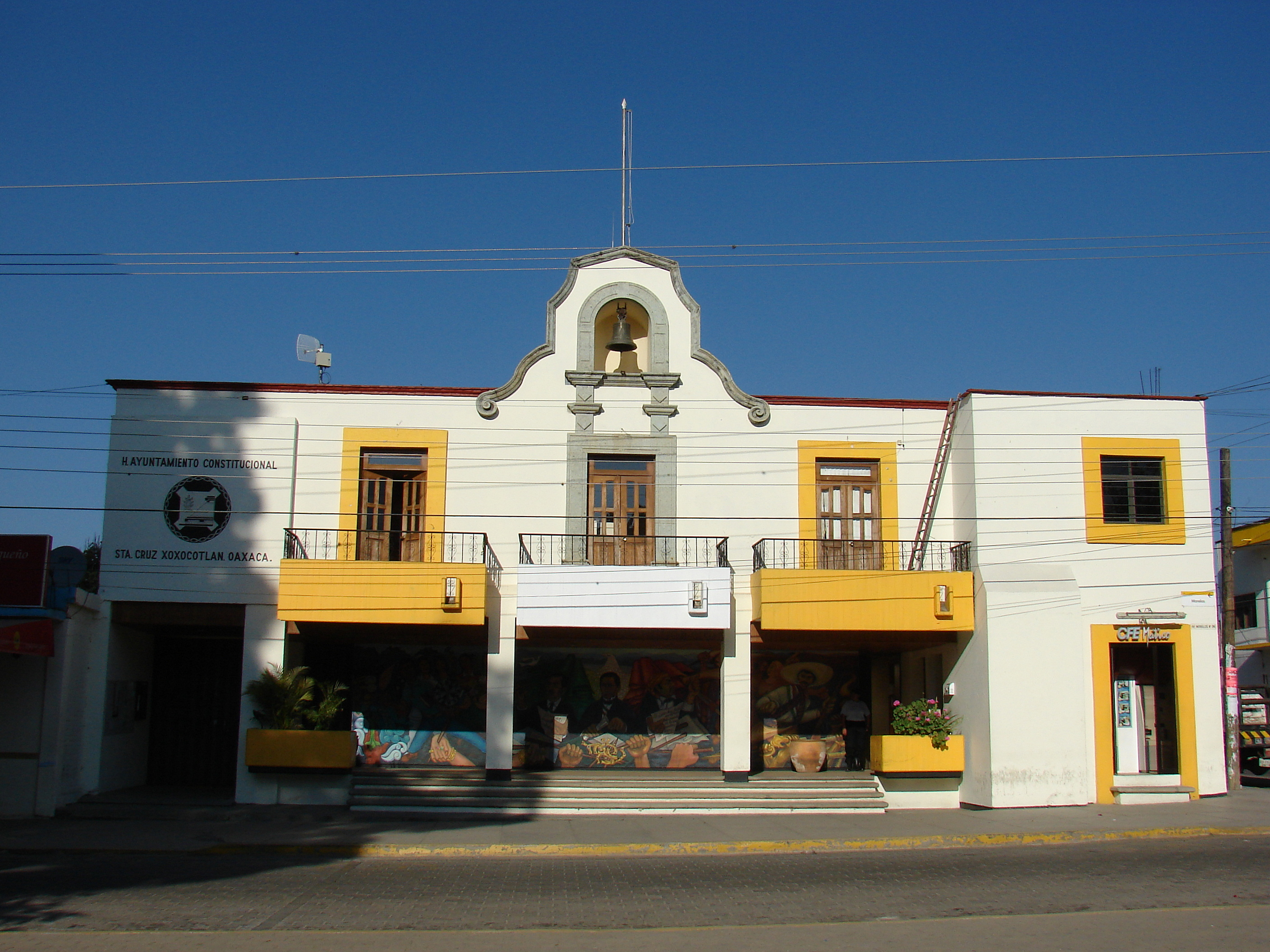
Santa Cruz Xoxocotlán Municipal Palace

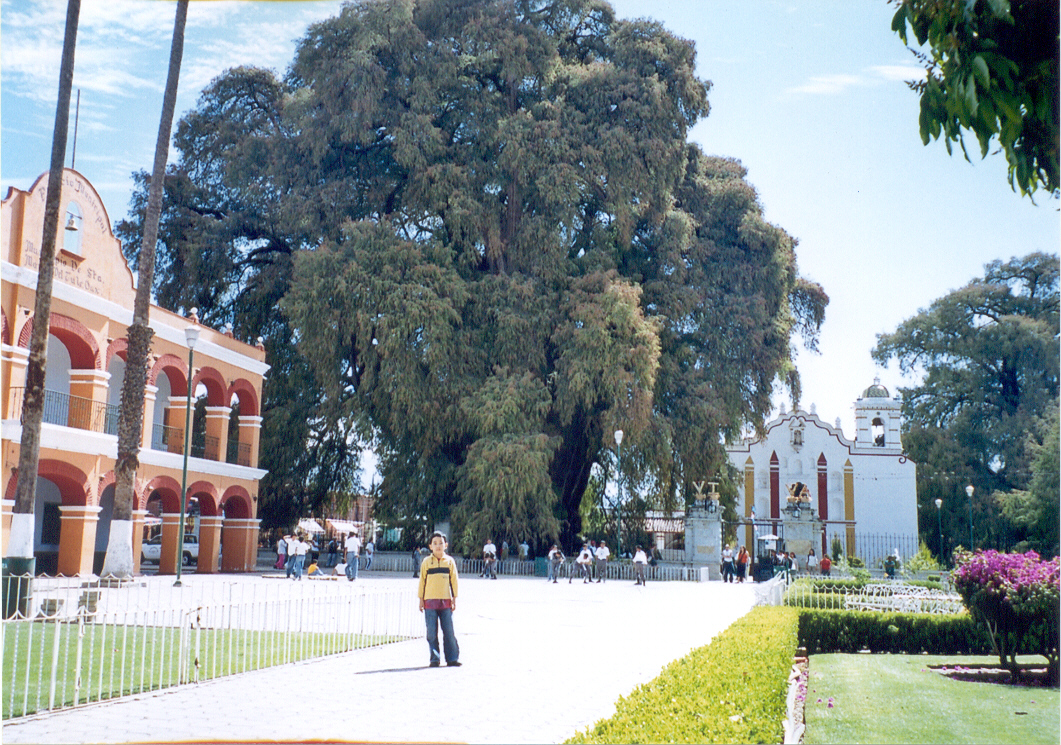
Tule tree with town church in background in Santa Maria de Tule

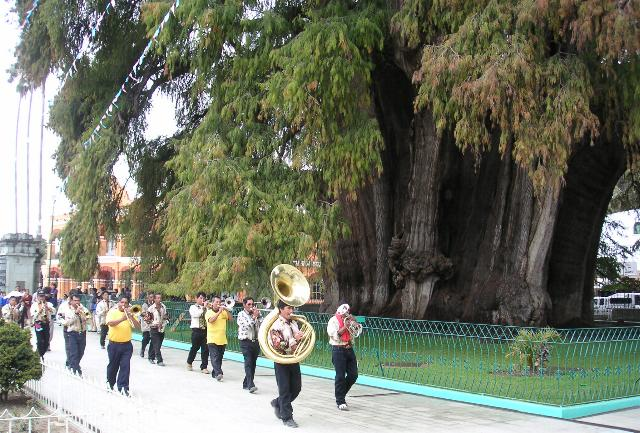
Band passing by the Santa Maria de Tule tree

== See also ==
- Municipalities of Oaxaca
