= Santo Domingo Tomaltepec =

- Municipality and town
- Location in Mexico
- Coordinates: 17°4′N 96°37′W
- Country: Mexico
- State: Oaxaca

Area
  - Total: 49.76 km^{2} (19.21 sq mi)
- Elevation: 1,590 m (5,220 ft)

Population (2005)
  - Total: 2,303
- Time zone: UTC-6 (Central Standard Time)

Santo Domingo Tomaltepec is a town and municipality in Oaxaca in south-western Mexico. It is part of the Centro District in the Valles Centrales region, about 10 km east of the city of Oaxaca. The municipality covers an area of 49.76 km^{2}. The climate is mild, with little change throughout the year. Natural vegetation is semi-desert, but agricultural production of maize, beans and fruit in the heavy clay soils is highly productive.

As of 2005, the municipality had 585 households with a total population of 2,303, of whom 347 spoke an indigenous language.
