= Agustín Cruz Tinoco =

Mexican artisan noted for his wood carvings

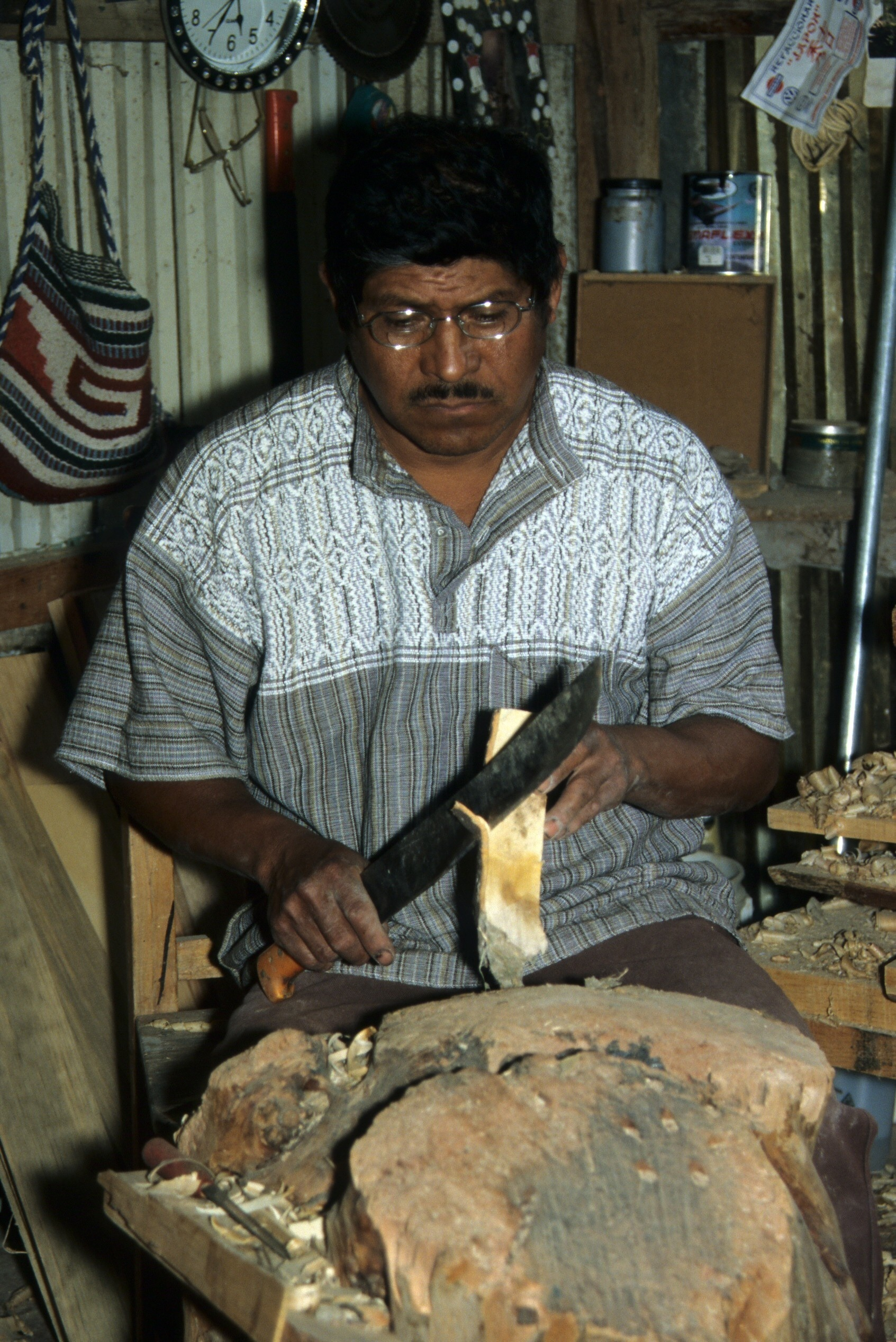
Agustín Cruz Tinoco of San Agustín de las Juntas, Oaxaca uses a machete to carve wood.

Agustín Cruz Tinoco is a Mixe artisan from San Agustín de las Juntas, Oaxaca, Mexico noted for his wood carvings. His work has been recognized both in Mexico and abroad.

== Origin ==
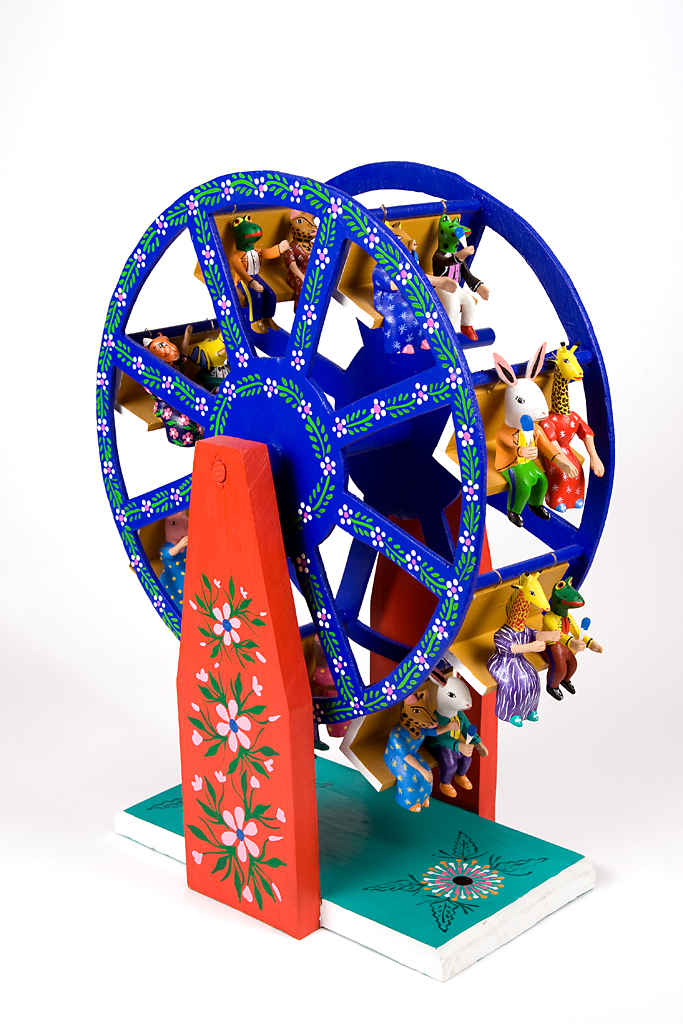
Ferris wheel by the artisan

Cruz Tinoco learned to carve as a child from his father, also a noted artisan, in his hometown of San Juan Otzolotepec in the Sierra Mixe region of Oaxaca, where his family grew coffee and corn. When he was older, he moved to San Agustín de las Juntas, a town near the Oaxacan state capital, and sent for his wife, Cleotilde Prudencio Martínez, and four children a year later. Initially he worked in construction to support his family, carving at night, finding more of a market for his works there than he had in his hometown, despite the fact that San Agustín de las Juntas is not a town noted for wood crafts.

== Artistry ==
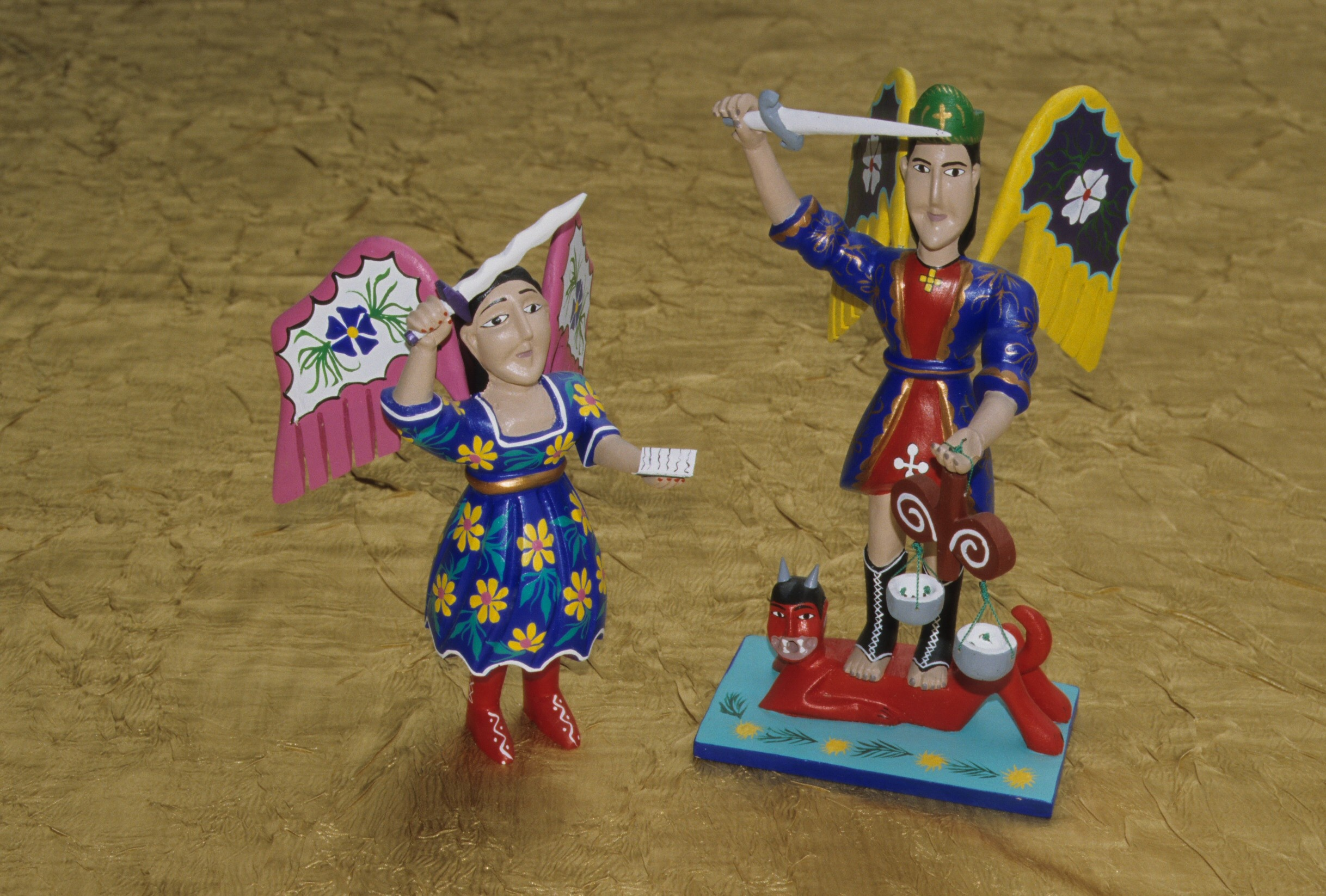
Angel and the Archangel Michael by the artisan

Cruz Tinoco is best known for his religious figures and nativity scenes, but also creates various other figures such as carts, carousels, Ferris wheels, and altarpieces. He has also made whimsical works such as nativity scenes mounted on a tortoise, boxes in a jaguar shape, skeletal figures and animals doing human activities and even a chess set pitting the Spanish conquistadors against the Mexican indigenous people. He works in pine, cedar, Mahogany and a soft local wood called copal, popular among Oaxacan craftsmen. He studies the raw wood in order to use its natural forms and qualities in the finished piece. His tools include machetes, various knives, chisels, agave thorns and needles. The machetes and large knives are for creating the basic shape of a piece, with the smaller implements to refine and create intricate details and designs.

== Involvement of the family ==
Originally Cruz Tinoco left the works unpainted until his older daughter Edilma became interested in painting them. This made the works more popular and soon the rest of the family were participating in the carving and painting, which is traditional among Oaxacan artisan families. His two sons help with the carving, with the younger, Manuel, being the more promising carver, and the older, Agustín Jr., doing much of the public relations work. His wife and two daughters do the painting, often with direction from Cruz Tinoco, using acrylics. First a base coat is applied, and other colors are applied over that, often with intricate and repeating designs.

== Recognition ==
Cruz Tinoco and the family have won awards and recognition for their work in Mexico and abroad. They participate regularly in the International Folk Art Market in Santa Fe, New Mexico and are featured in the book Grandes Maestros de Arte Popular de Iberoamerica, published in 2014 by Banamex.

== See also ==
- List of Mexican artisans
