= Cuilapan de Guerrero =

Town and municipality in Oaxaca, Mexico

Cuilapan Cuilapam
- Town and municipality
- Cuilapan de Guerrero
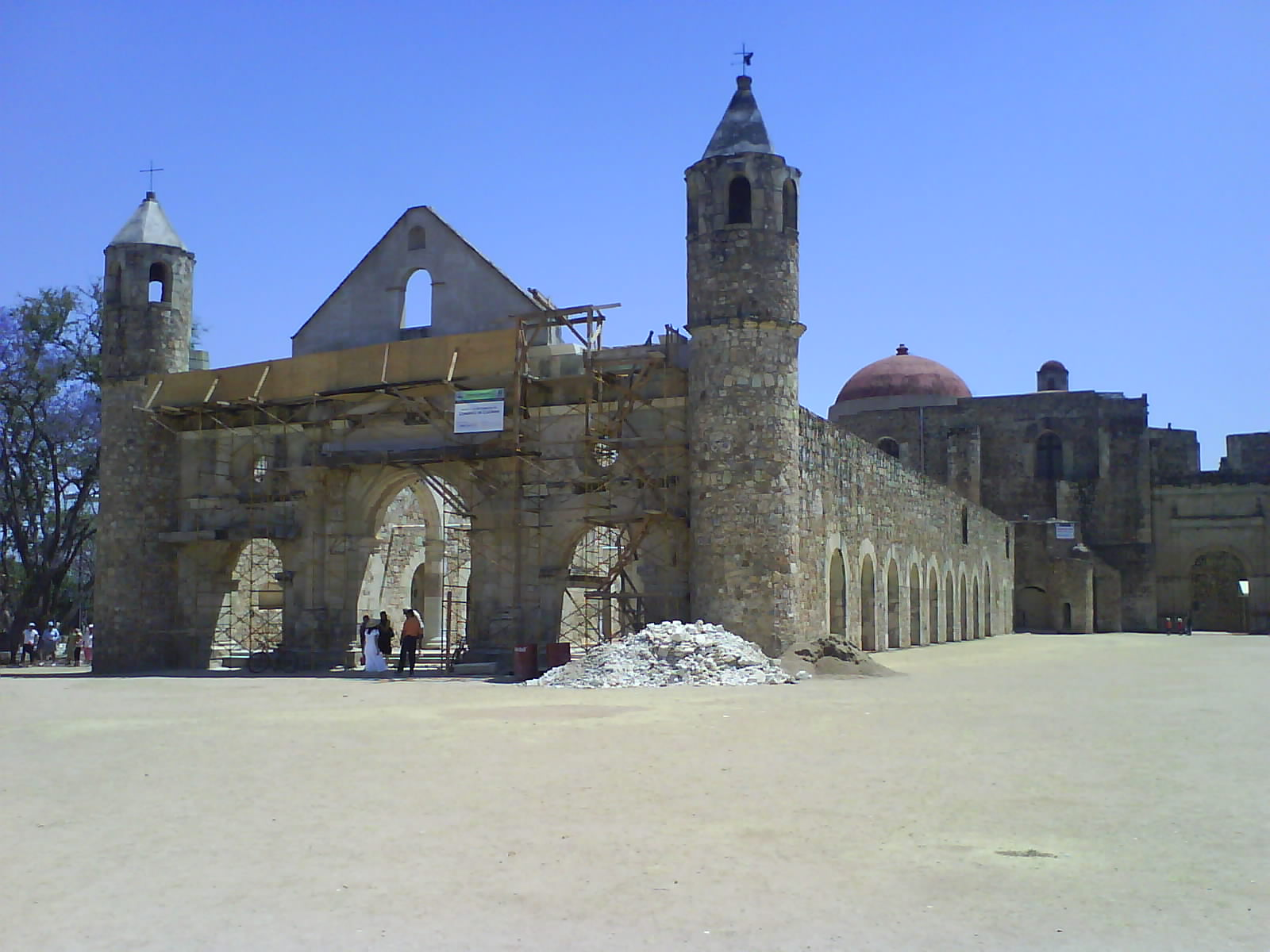
- Basilica of Cuilapan

- Location within Mexico
- Coordinates: 16°59′50″N 96°46′54″W
- Country: Mexico
- State: Oaxaca
- Founded: 1500–500 BCE

Government
  - Municipal President: Andres Cruz Martínez
- Elevation (of seat): 1,560 m (5,120 ft)

Population (2005) Municipality
  - Municipality: 15,041
  - Seat: 11,094
- Time zone: UTC-6 (Central (US Central))
- Postal code (of seat): 71240

Cuilapan de Guerrero is a town and municipality located in the central valley region of Oaxaca in southern Mexico. It is 10 kilometres (6.2 mi) to the south of the capital city of Oaxaca on the road leading to Villa de Zaachila, and is in the Centro District in the Valles Centrales region.

Cuilapan, originally called Sahayuca, has been a permanent settlement since at least 500 BCE. It developed into a city state but was absorbed by Monte Albán until between 600 and 900 CE. After this, Cuilapan returned to being an independent city-state, equal to a number of other important city states in the area. After the Spanish conquest, Cuilapan had a population of over 40,000 people with formidable social, economic and cultural institutions. For this reason, a major monastery dedicated to James the apostle was established there in the 1550s in order to evangelize the Mixtec and Zapotec populations. However, the area underwent decline of its native population in the 16th and early 17th century and the extravagant monastery complex would later deteriorate in the 19th century. Today, the town is a quiet place with a fraction of its former population and prestige. The ruins of the monastery complex remain mostly as a national monument administered by the Instituto Nacional de Antropología e Historia.

== History ==
The Cuilapan area has been settled by humans since 1500 BCE with a sedentary village established by 500 BCE. These sedentary peoples developed activities such as weaving, pottery and stonemasonry, with permanent houses, ceremonial structures and tombs. The society here grew and stratified over time and eventually a simple writing system came into existence. Cuilapan developed as an independent city state until the rise of Monte Albán, which came into dominance because it provided a refuge in a defensible location. During this time, Cuilapan was one of the satellite cities of the dominion. Between 600 and 900 CE, Monte Albán declined and collapsed, allowing Cuilapan and others to become independent again. Excavations from this period show that Cuilapan gained prominence in the post Monte Albán period, but was not dominant over its neighbors and never reached the heights of the former dominion. At that time, Cuilapan was identifiable as a Zapotec city state. Later, in the post-classic period, this and other Zapotec cities would be overrun by the Mixtecs.

At the time of the Spanish conquest, Cuilapan was a large multi-ethnic population center of 43,000 people and one of the centers of the political, economic and cultural life of the central valleys of Oaxaca. The area was still the center of an ongoing struggle for dominance between the Mixtecs and the Zapotecs. To complicate things further, the Aztecs also had a presence in the central valleys region, and exacted tribute from Cuilapan through their military garrison in Huaxyácac (today the city of Oaxaca). This tribute included products such as corn, beans, clothing, gold and cochineal. Cuilapan had a number of its own subject settlements which included Camotlán, Etla, Quauxilotitlan [Huitzo], Guaxaca, Macuilcóchitl, Tlacochahuaya, [San Sebastian] Teítipac and Ocotlán. However, the Aztecs sought only tribute and left Mixtec cultural and political traditions here mostly intact.

The Spanish found a thriving community with formidable political, economic and social organizations. The Mixtecs dominated and society was divided into a ruling class called caciques and commoners called macehuales. This heterogeneous system would mostly stay after the Spanish conquest, with the ruling class keeping many of its privileges with the conditions of conversion to Christianity and fealty to the Spanish crown. The original Mixtec settlement was at the foot of a hill in this area, but the modern town was established by Fray Domingo de Oguinaga and Zapotecs in 1551, with the founding of the monastery of Saint James.

This monastery was a major center of evangelization efforts in the early colonial period in the central valleys region of Oaxaca, although it was never finished. The Dominicans were in charge of evangelization and in a few years had managed to baptize nearly all the inhabitants. However, this was not enough to ensure acceptance of the new faith, so the monastery with its large open chapel and elaborate murals was begun in the 1550s to reinforce Christian ideas, modified to relate to traditional Mixtec and Zapotec beliefs. However, one major effect the monastery had was to move the population center from the original Mixtec settlement to one surrounding the monastery.

Culiapan was caught up in a sovereignty dispute between Hernán Cortés, the Marquis of the Valley of Oaxaca, and the city of Antequera (which would become the city of Oaxaca). As the Marquis, Cortés had absolute control over Cuiliapan and sixteen other towns in the valley as well as all of these towns’ subject villages. Residents of the city of Antequera were fearful of Cortés's unchecked political authority in the region in spite of their city charter granting them autonomy. The struggle lasted from the 1520s to the 1530s with each claiming land from the other. Eventually, the authority of the Marquis was limited to four towns known as the Cuatro Villas in 1533, with Culiapan being one of them. With this arrangement, Culiapan became a Spanish “cabecera” (seat) for a number of other, smaller settlements.

The decline of Cuilapan began in the 16th century, when the population fell from 43,000 in the 1520s to 7,000 in 1600. Construction of the massive basilica and monastery was halted by the 1570s, and was never finished. The Dominican friars were obliged to hand over the complex to regular clergy in the mid-18th century. From this point, the wealth and prestige of the institution declined. Church authorities neglected the maintenance of the complex, and it deteriorated until it was finally divested of its religious function by the 19th century.

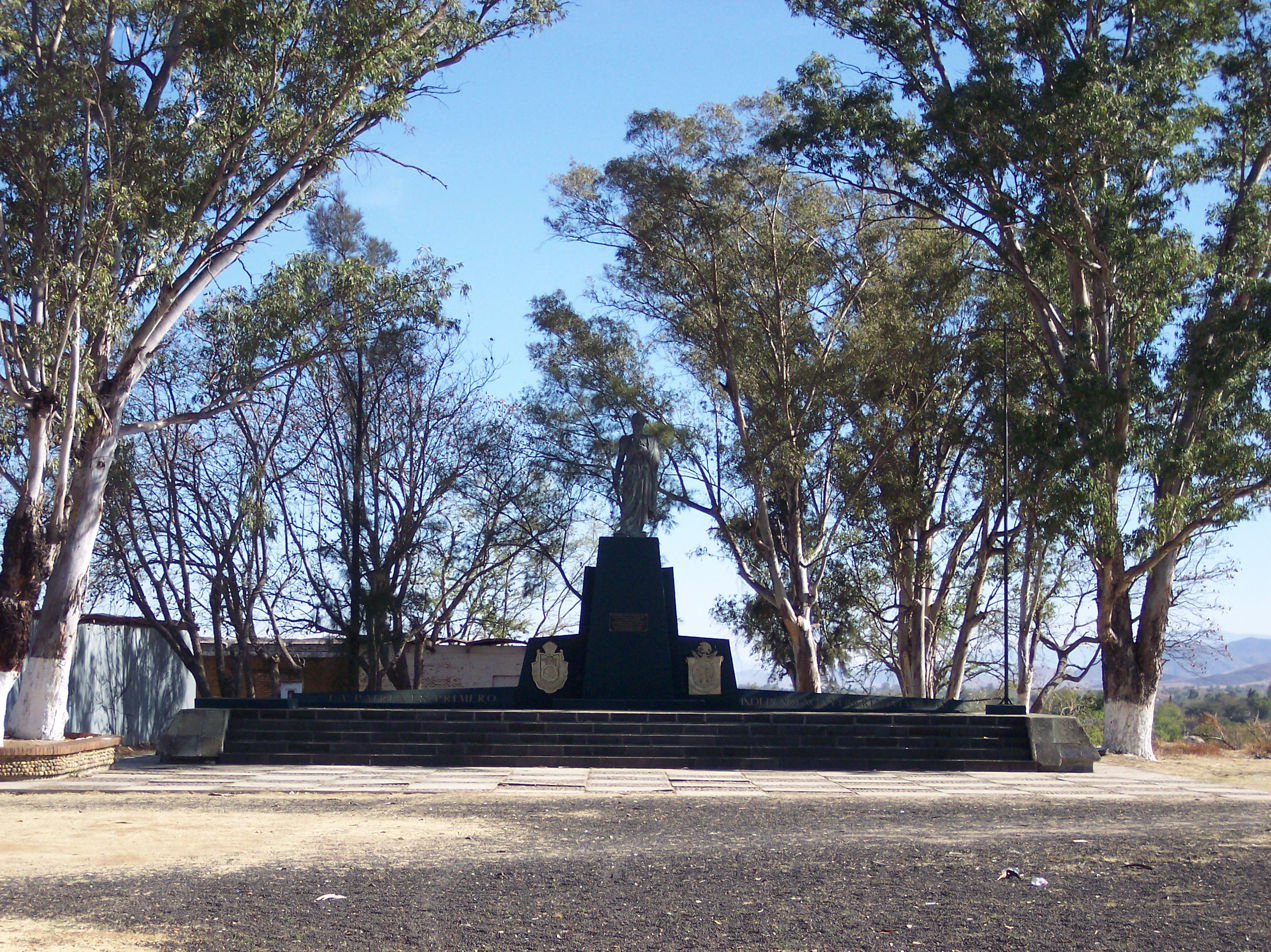
Monument where Vicente Guerrero was executed

The complex has had several uses since that time, including that of a school, but its best-known function was that of the prison and execution place of Vicente Guerrero in 1831.

The town received a visit by Pope John Paul II in 1979.

The name for the original Mixtec city was Sahayuca, which means “at the foot of the mountain.” Later in the pre-Hispanic period, it adopted the name of Cuilapam Quayogol and Ampa-Valle, when the Aztecs began to have significant influence. The name is spelled two ways, “Cuilapam” and “Cuilapan.” This name is from Nahuatl but its meaning is debated. It has been interpreted to mean “the place behind,” “the water behind,” “dirty place,” “painted river,” “at the foot of the mountain,” and “place or valley of the cocoyles”, a type of small coconut tree. The reason behind the two spellings is a difference in the Nahuatl suffix, with-pan meaning “place of “ and –pam meaning “valley of.” Both spellings can be seen on signs and maps and both are considered correct.

The federal government plans a homage to Vicente Guerrero in the community on February 14, 2021.

== The town ==
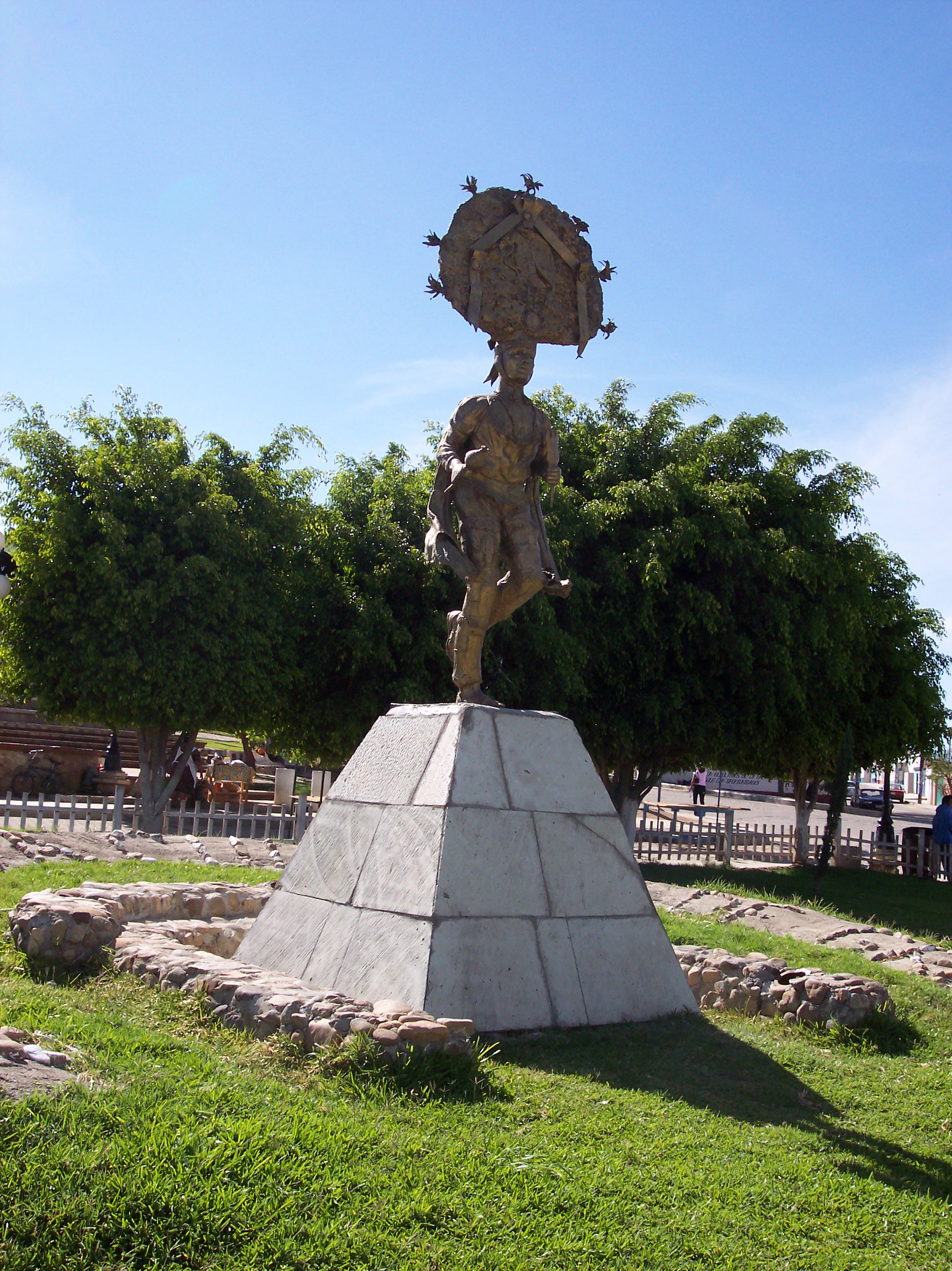
Statue of Danza de la Pluma dancer

Today, the town of Cuilapan is primarily Mixtec with just over 11,000 people. It is a quiet town, unlike the pre-Hispanic and early colonial city it used to be, maintaining only a fraction of its former population and prestige.

Much of the life of the town still centers on religion, with saints’ days and other similar events celebrated with folk dances, masses, processions, fireworks, rodeos and more, accompanied by bands that play chilenas, sones and other regional music. The major local celebration of the year is the feast of the Apostle James, which takes place from 24 to 27 January. The 24th is celebrated with evening masses, as is the morning of the 25th. A midday Mass on this day concludes with the Danza de la Pluma. In the late afternoon to evening hours there is a dance event called a “jaripeo” and more traditional dances in the main square accompanied by live music. These repeat on the 26th with the 27th concluding with a more modern dance event.

Cuilapam is the origin of the Danza de la Pluma and is known for the making of the elaborate headdresses which are worn by the dancers. This dance is one which is featured at the annual Guelaguetza event held in Oaxaca city in July. During festivals and in the markets common dishes such as moles such as negro, rojo coloradito, verde and amarillo as well as tasajo, tlayudas, tamales wrapped in banana leaves and cegueza (ground corn and baked with barbacoa similar to a dumpling) can be found. Beverages include atole with chocolate, hot chocolate, tejate (drink made with mamey seeds, corn, cocoa and a flower called Rosita de cacao), horchata and hibiscus tea.

== The ex monastery of Santiago Apóstol ==
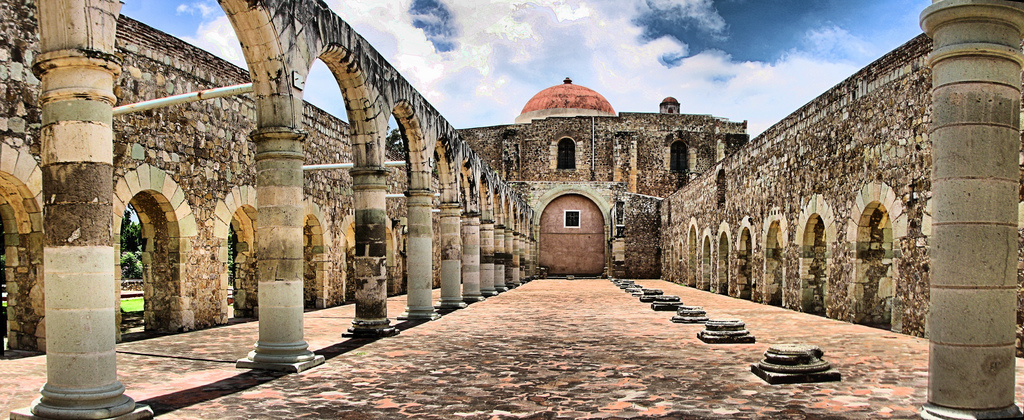
Basilica at the ex-monastery Santiago Apostol

The former monastery still defines the town and is the major attraction for visitors. The fortress-like complex is easily seen from the highway as one travels south from the city of Oaxaca towards Zaachila, and it is visited by both Mexican and international tourists. The complex is located on a small hill which gives it a view of much of the valley area. It is one of the most extravagant and elaborate colonial area constructions in Oaxaca, but it is often overlooked in favor of churches and monasteries located in the Mexico City area. Built of green quarried stone and river rocks, it is a quiet place where footsteps can echo in the hallways. The extravagances of the site include the tall basilica, the elaborate baptismal font, the Gothic cloister and murals, which remain as national treasures. The decorative work of the monastery, especially its murals, are important because they show a systematic blending of indigenous elements into the Christian framework, done in order to support the evangelization process in the local Mixtec and Zapotec peoples. The single-naved church is used for worship but the roofless basilica and cloister are under the control of INAH, which uses many of the second floor rooms of the cloister as workshops for restoration projects and runs a small museum with important liturgical items from the 16th century.

== The municipality ==
As municipal seat, the town of Cuilapan is the governing authority for more than thirty-five other named communities, the largest of which include Cruz Blanca, Carrizal, Manzano and Tiracoz. The municipal population is 15,041 (2005) with just under seventy five percent living in the town proper. Most of the population is ethnically Zapotec with the Mixtec (Mixtec Alta) coming second. Despite being less numerous, Mixtec traditions dominate due to their political dominance starting in the 13th century. The municipality covers an area of 49.75 km^{2} and borders the municipalities of San Pedro Ixtlahuaca, Villa de Zaachila, Santa Cruz Xococotlan and San Raymundo Jalpan.

The valley is surrounded by the densely forested mountains of the Sierra Madre del Sur. The terrain is steep and rocky with the main source of water being a branch of the Atoyac River. The climate is temperate and mostly dry with most rain falling in summer and fall. Wildlife consists of rodents and small reptiles. Some larger species such as the armadillo are in danger of extinction. The soil is highly susceptible to erosion.

About sixty percent of the population is dedicated to farming with principal crops being corn, beans and alfalfa. Thirty percent raise livestock such as pigs, cattle, goats, horses and domestic fowl. About ten percent travel to work in Oaxaca city and some residents are employed as guides at the nearby Monte Albán site.

== Bibliography ==
- Sara Morasch Taylor (2006). Art and evangelization at the sixteenth-century convento of Santiago Apostol at Cuilapan, Mexico (Ph.D thesis). Bryn Mawr College. Docket AAT 3240495.
