= San Andrés Ixtlahuaca =

- Municipality and town
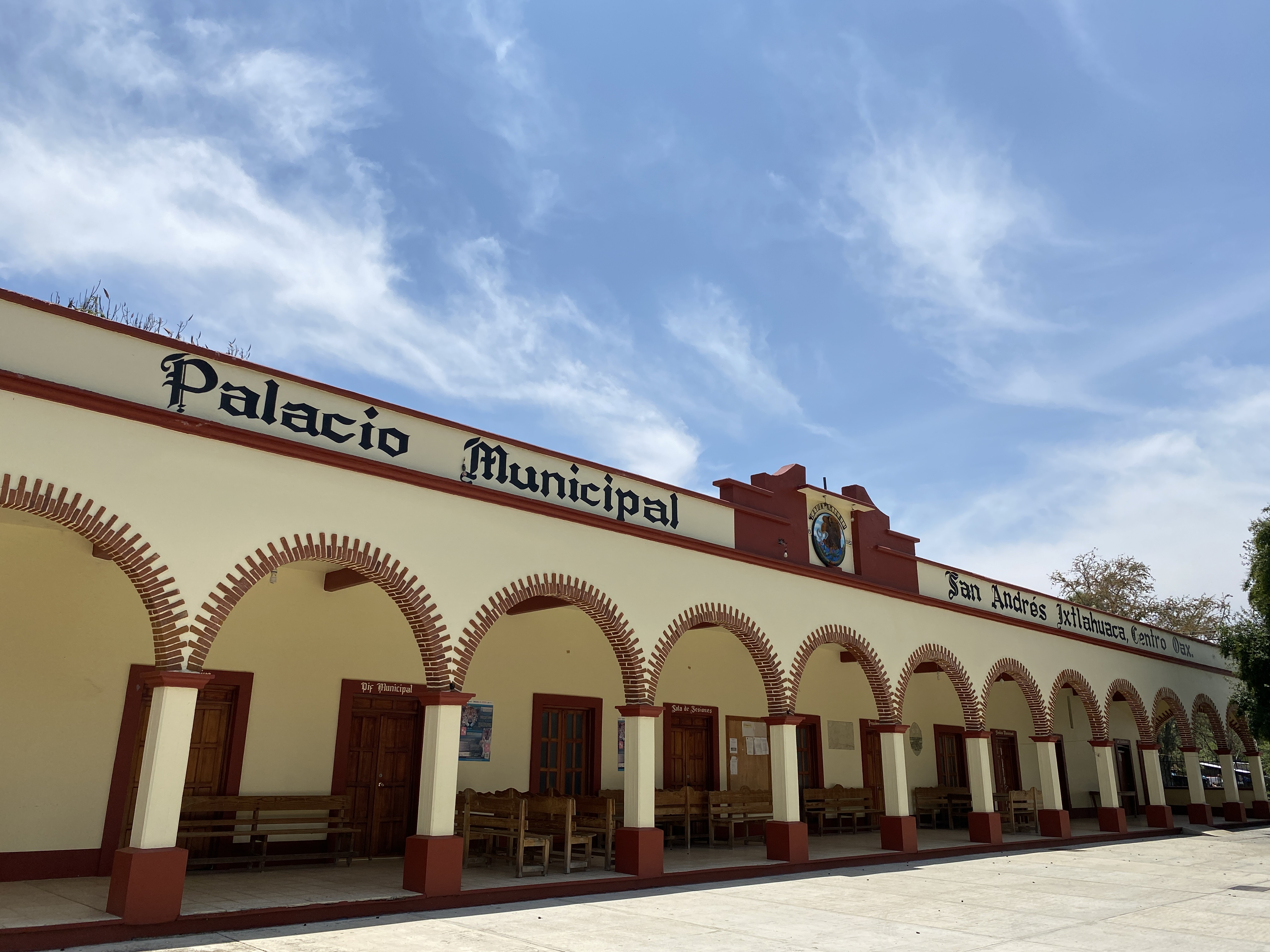
- Town hall

- Location in Mexico
- Coordinates: 17°04′N 96°49′W
- Country: Mexico
- State: Oaxaca

Area
  - Total: 33.17 km^{2} (12.81 sq mi)

Population (2005)
  - Total: 1,343
- Time zone: UTC-6 (Central Standard Time)

San Andrés Ixtlahuaca is a town and municipality in Oaxaca in south-western Mexico. The municipality covers an area of 33.17 km^{2}. It is part of the Centro District in the Valles Centrales region. As of 2005, the municipality had a total population of 1,343.
