= San Agustín Yatareni =

- Municipality and town
- Location in Mexico
- Coordinates: 17°05′N 96°40′W
- Country: Mexico
- State: Oaxaca

Area
  - Total: 33.17 km^{2} (12.81 sq mi)

Population (2005)
  - Total: 3,176
- Time zone: UTC-6 (Central Standard Time)

San Agustín Yatareni is a town and municipality in Oaxaca in southwestern Mexico. The municipality covers an area of 33.17 km^{2}. It is part of the Centro District in the Valles Centrales region. As of 2005 the municipality had a total population of 3,176.
