= San Sebastián Tutla =

- Municipality and town
- Location in Mexico
- Coordinates: 17.0667°N 96.6667°W
- Country: Mexico
- State: Oaxaca

Area
  - Total: 8.93 km^{2} (3.45 sq mi)

Population (2010)
  - Total: 16,241
- Time zone: UTC-6 (Central Standard Time)

San Sebastián Tutla is a town and municipality in Oaxaca in south-western Mexico. The municipality covers an area of 8.93 km^{2}. It is part of the Centro District in the Valles Centrales region. As of 2010, the municipality had a total population of 16,241.

== Geography ==
San Sebastian de Tutla bordered to the north with Tlalixtac Yatareni San Agustin Cabrera. To the south with San Antonio de la Cal and Santa Cruz Amilpas. The east with Santa Cruz and Tlalixtac Amilpas Cabrera. To the west with Santa Lucia del Camino. It is located in the central state in the Central Valleys Region.

The weather in San Sebastian de Tutla is temperate and the vegetation is basically a semi-desert and chaparral plants low in the predominantly mesquite, the gourd and cazaguate. The fauna are still extant the red squirrel, the rat, the opossum, the buzzard and the Mexican duck.

== History ==
“The archaeological history of San Sebastian Tutla began at the same time that he founded the ancient city of Monte Alban 500 BC (Data from a study conducted by the department of anthropology at the University of Giorgia), this means that 2500 years ago said it hundreds twenty-five generations or human, they established their first homes on the slopes of the hills, this proved by archaeological remains that found in those areas.

In the year 1521 when the Spanish arrived in the valley of Oaxaca, they found the people living in huts and villages, not the exact date where as the arrival of the Spanish, the Marquis de Cuilapam sent to populate the valley, which received the title of San Francisco Tutla, this name led him to the end of 1650 according to documents in the file dated November 19, 1658, the Royal Audiencia of New Spain declared void the orders formed by the justice Antequera on the dispossession of land within the district of San Francisco Tutla San Sebastian at the expense of sending Tutla reinstate them, which was executed on 12 December of that year by Captain Pedro Coto mayor Cerrero.

In 1687, the mayor of the four villages of the Marquis del Valle, Captain Don Antonio de Avelar and Carrasco, after subpoena of adjacent built a measure of survey and demarcation of land in San Sebastian Tutla. In 1711 the natives and residents of the town of Santa Cruz, claimed possession of land belonging to San Sebastian Tutla own, having denied the request.

On October 3, 1720, the mayor largest of the four villas of the Marquis, befriended the Indians of the people in possession of their lands, detailing the boundaries routes, but data are so vague that minister in taking that trouble, can not now require much less identify them as points are described as "a keystone", "the bank of a ditch."”

== Bibliography ==
- Consejo Nacional de Población y Vivienda, La Población de los Municipios de México 1950 - 1990. Ed. UNO Servicios Gráficos, México, Nov., 1994.
- Instituto Nacional de Estadística, Geografía e Informática, Censo General de Población y Vivienda 2000. México 2001.
- Secretaría de Gobernación, Centro Nacional de Estudios Municipales, Gobierno del Estado de Oaxaca, Los Municipios de Oaxaca, Enciclopedia de los Municipios de México. Talleres Gráficos de la Nación, México, D.F. 1988.
- Secretaría de Gobernación, Instituto Nacional para el Federalismo y el Desarrollo Municipal, Sistema Nacional de Información Municipal. México 2002.
