= San Jacinto Amilpas =

- Municipality and town
- Location in Mexico
- Coordinates: 17°06′N 96°46′W
- Country: Mexico
- State: Oaxaca

Area
  - Total: 12.76 km^{2} (4.93 sq mi)

Population (2005)
  - Total: 10,100
- Time zone: UTC-6 (Central Standard Time)

San Jacinto Amilpas is a town and municipality in Oaxaca in southeastern Mexico and is the third most densely populated municipality in Oaxaca behind Santa Lucía del Camino and Santa Cruz Amilpas. The municipality covers an area of 12.76 km^{2}. It is part of the Centro District in the Valles Centrales region. As of 2005, the municipality had a total population of 10,100.
