= Zaachila =

Mesoamerican city

Coordinates: 16°57′0″N 96°45′0″W

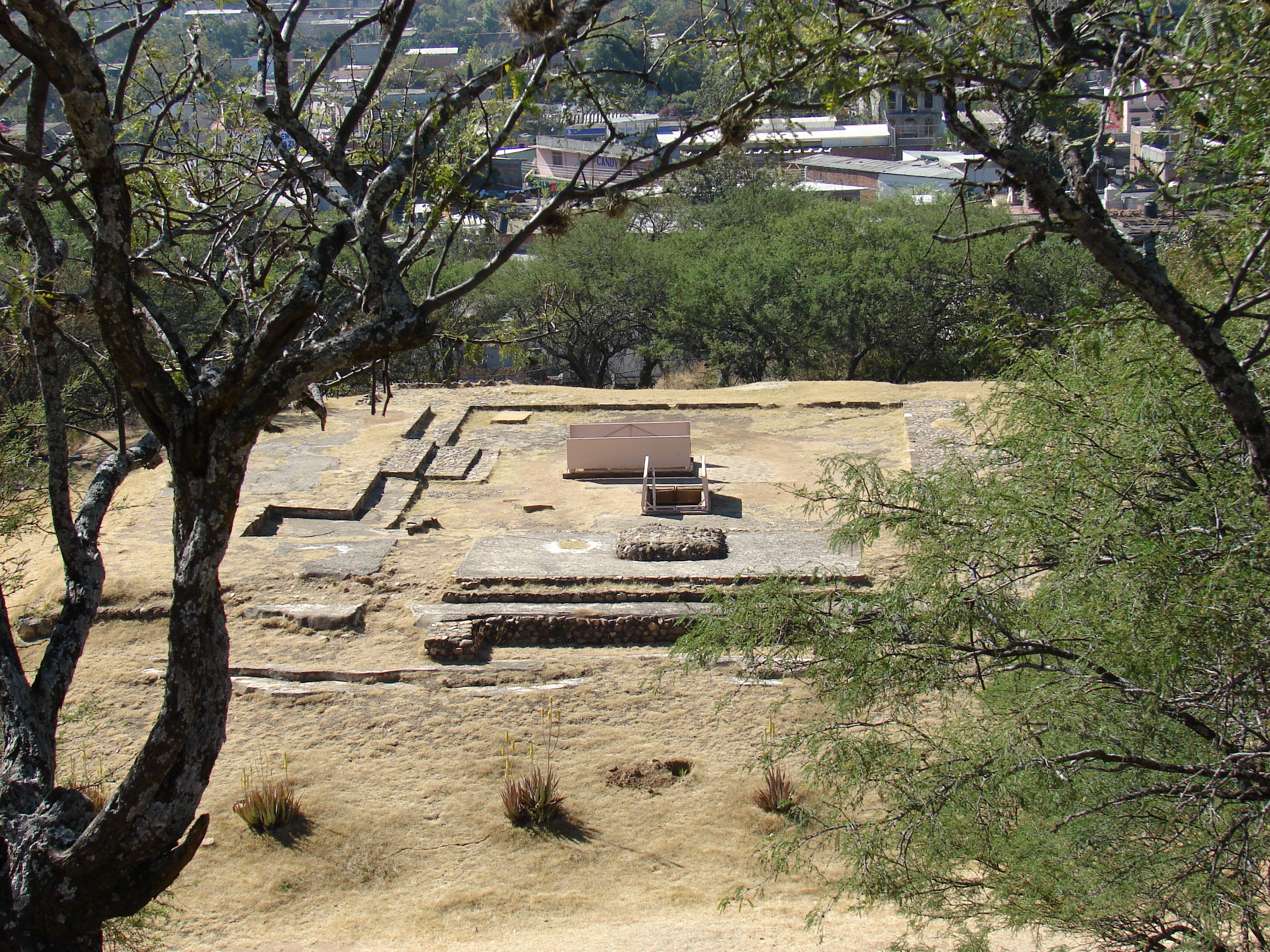
Archaeological Zone of Zaachila

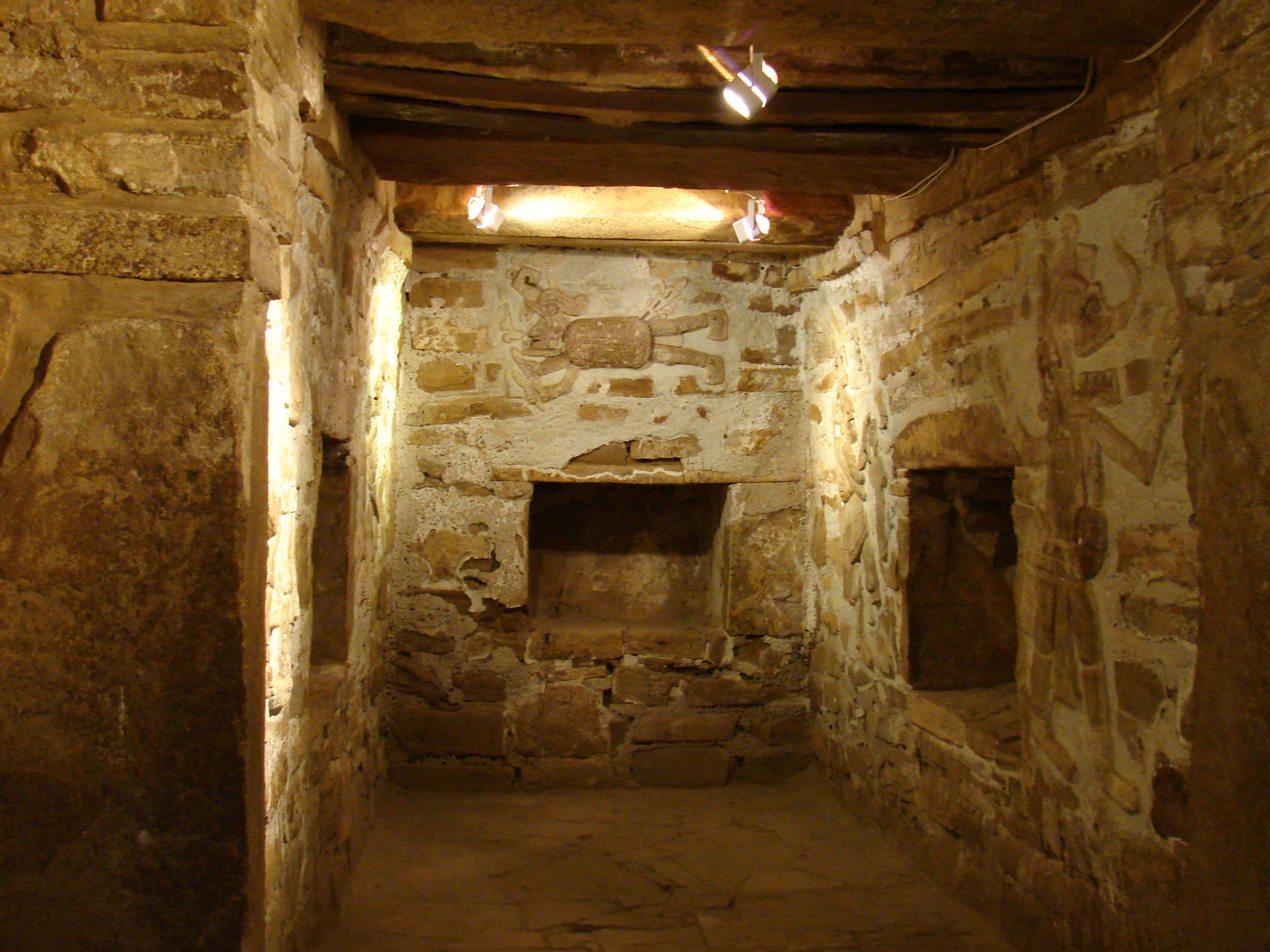
Tomb 1 of Zaachila of Mixtec influence.

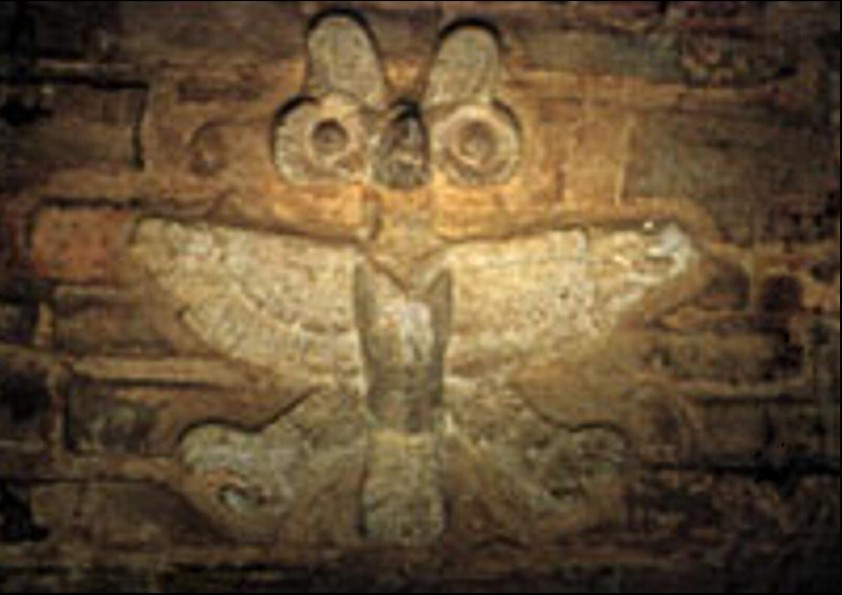
Zaachila symbol inside the tomb.

Zaachila (the Zapotec name; Nahuatl: Teotzapotlan; Mixtec: Ñuhu Tocuisi) was a powerful Mesoamerican city in what is now Oaxaca, Mexico, 6 km (3.7 mi) from the city of Oaxaca. The city is named after Zaachila Yoo, the Zapotec ruler, in the late 14th and early 15th century. Zaachila was the home of Donaji, the last Zapotec princess. Zaachila is now a historical location. In the middle is a sizable unexplored pyramid mound where two tombs were found in 1962. These tombs are thought to belong to important Mixtec persons.

Zaachila became the final Zapotec capital after Monte Albán fell. The Mixtecs took control of the capital prior to the arrival of the Spaniards. The history of the pre-Hispanic city is unclear. One theory is that the site flourished 1100 and 1521 CE. Another theory is that the city was founded in 1399 and could be compared to Tenochtitlan, as it was a city in the middle of a lake. The full extent of the ancient city is not known either, principally because excavation is impeded by the fact that most mounds have inhabited structures on them.

Zaachila was conquered by Ahuitzotl in 1495, by which time Teitipac, (Note: There are three settlements known as Teitipac in the area, and, as noted in the article San Sebastián Teitipac, it is uncertain which, if any, is the Teitipac described in historic accounts.) Macuilxochitl de Artigas Carranza and Teotitlan del Valle were subjects of Zaachila, and San Baltazar Chichicapam, Tlacolula de Matamoros, Mitla and Tlalixtac de Cabrera were somewhat more autonomous subjects. The first three were transferred to the overlordship of Cuilapan de Guerrero after the Aztec conquest. At this time, local products of note included nopal fruit, maguey products, firewood, salt and small amounts of cochineal. Zaachila fought wars with Tututepec and Tlaxiaco.

In 1971 new excavations found two more tombs registered with the numbers 3 and 4. Even though the offerings were simpler than the ones found by Gallegos, tomb 4 end up being of special interest because of the paint remains found on its lintel. Tree roots and rain infiltration have damaged the designs, according to Acosta (1972) they represent skulls and cross bones over a red colored background. Since 1990 the project "La pintura mural prehispánica en México" of the Institute of Aesthetic Research of the National Autonomous University of Mexico, it is dedicated to record and study of the pre-Columbian murals, like those from Zaachila.

Due to population growth and neglect of the authorities, a housing project was authorized which has contributed to the damage and pillaging of this valuable archaeological site.

Nowadays, in this community barter is a common practice, and every Thursday many merchants come to this place to exchange and sell their products.

== The big festival of the Zaachila hill | Laanii Roo Xten Daan Zaadxil ==
The last Monday of July, the Zaachila community meets in the archaeological site, better known as "el cerrito," to honor the Corn Goddess (Pitao Ko Shuub), in traditional Laanii Roo Xten Daan Zaadxil.

The Goddess Pitao Ko Shuub is chosen among several young women who previously enrolled in a contest, the main demanded features are the long black hair, they must have brown skin and share a theme of the history of Zaachila. The chosen one will be host of all the activities of the festival.

Young women in the ten neighborhoods that conform the town organize months before the festival to represent the most iconic dances of various regions of Oaxaca, like: "La Flor de la Piña de Tuxtepec (the pineapple flower of Tuxtepec)," "El Jarabe de Ejutla," "Las Chilenas de la Costa," "El Jarabe Mixe," "Los Bailes del Istmo de Tehuantepec," and has a central valley special input the "Dance of the Feather" and "Los Zancudos," this last one performed by young men on stilts almost five feet tall.

In this festivity the ejidal authorities get involved, and they are in charge of giving to the participants tepache (a fruit fermented beverage), mezcal, atole and tamales.

In this festival cultural events, calendas, parades, culinary samples and other events are celebrated too.

== Climate ==
Climate data for Zaachila
Month	Jan	Feb	Mar	Apr	May	Jun	Jul	Aug	Sep	Oct	Nov	Dec	Year
Mean daily maximum °C (°F)	28.1 (82.6)	29.7 (85.5)	31.3 (88.3)	32.0 (89.6)	32.3 (90.1)	29.8 (85.6)	29.0 (84.2)	29.1 (84.4)	28.7 (83.7)	27.7 (81.9)	27.5 (81.5)	27.3 (81.1)	29.4 (84.9)
Mean daily minimum °C (°F)	7.1 (44.8)	9.6 (49.3)	10.7 (51.3)	12.7 (54.9)	13.7 (56.7)	14.5 (58.1)	14.4 (57.9)	14 (57)	14.3 (57.7)	13.1 (55.6)	10 (50)	7.6 (45.7)	11.8 (53.2)
Average precipitation cm (inches)	0 (0)	0.51 (0.2)	1.8 (0.7)	4.3 (1.7)	9.4 (3.7)	14 (5.4)	11 (4.3)	10 (4)	13 (5)	4.1 (1.6)	1.0 (0.4)	0.25 (0.1)	69 (27)
Source: Weatherbase

== See also ==
- Zapotec civilization
