= Tlalixtac de Cabrera =

- Municipality and town
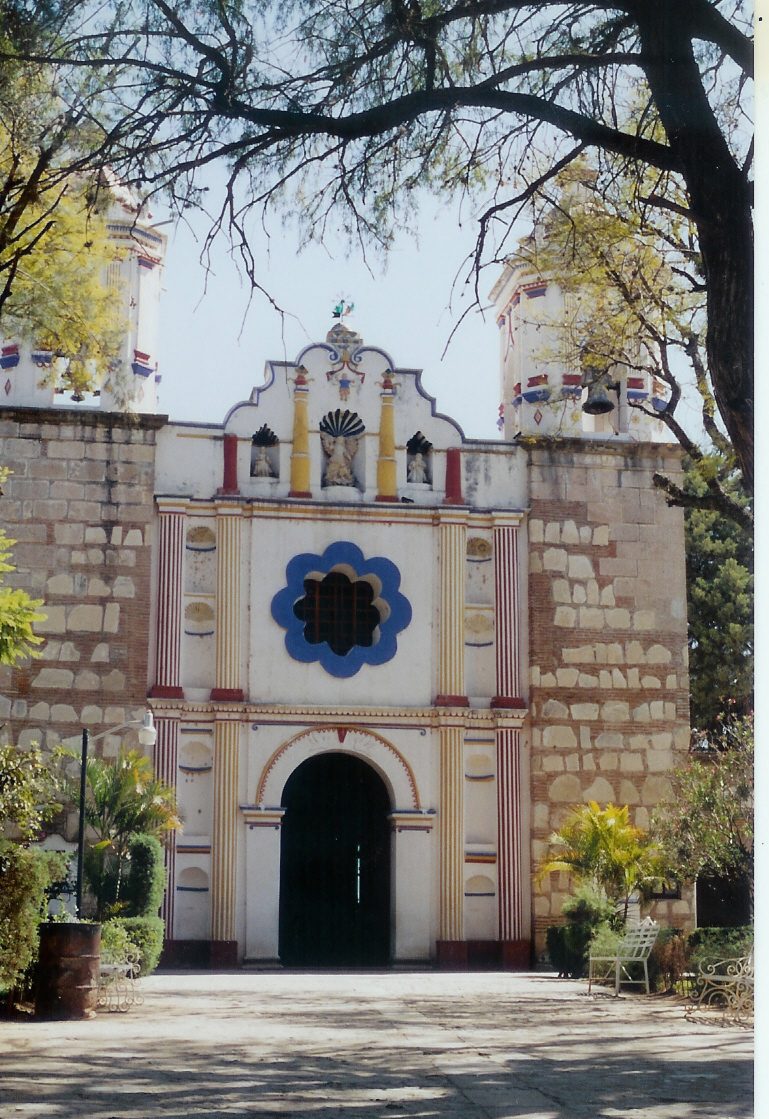
- Iglesia de San Miguel Arcángel

- Location in Mexico
- Coordinates: 17°04′N 96°39′W
- Country: Mexico
- State: Oaxaca
- Time zone: UTC-6 (Central Standard Time)

Tlalixtac de Cabrera is a town and municipality in Oaxaca in south-western Mexico. The municipality covers an area of km^{2}. It is part of the Centro District in the Valles Centrales region. As of 2005, the municipality had a total population of .

== History ==
Tlalixtac, historically also referred to as Taliztaca or Tlaliztacan, was a prehispanic Zapotec settlement. It was home to an idol of Coquihuani, the god of light, to whom were offered quail and parrot feathers, dogs, blood, and human sacrifices of boys and men, accompanied by music, dancing, and consumption of pulque. Tlalixtac was a subject town of Zaachila, to which it paid tribute of feathers and mantles. It also served alongside its overlord in wars.
