= Mixteco River =

Location
- Country: Mexico

The Mixteco River is a river of Mexico.

The mountainous terrain of Oaxaca allows for no navigable rivers; instead, there are a large number of smaller ones, which often change name from area to area. The continental divide passes through the state, meaning that there is drainage towards both the Gulf of Mexico and the Pacific Ocean. Most of the drainage towards the Gulf is represented by the Papaloapan and Coatzacoalcos Rivers and their tributaries such as the Grande and Salado Rivers. Three rivers account for most of the water headed for the Pacific: the Atoyac River, Tehuantepec River, and the Mixteco River, with their tributaries.

== See also ==
- List of rivers of Mexico
