= Tehuantepec River =

River in Mexico

Tehuantepec River Rio Tehuantepec
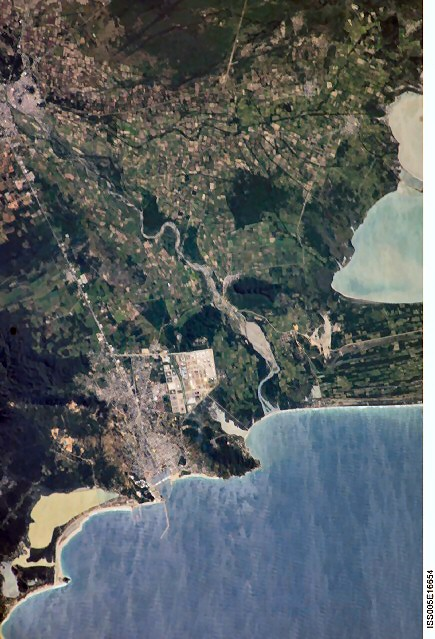

- Location of mouth

Location
- Country: Mexico
- State: Oaxaca

Physical characteristics
- Mouth
  - location: Gulf of Tehuantepec, Pacific Ocean
  - coordinates: 16°11′16″N 95°08′45″W

The Tehuantepec River is a river in Oaxaca, Mexico. The Tehuantepec flows into the Gulf of Tehuantepec on the Pacific Ocean coast of the Isthmus of Tehuantepec. The mountainous terrain of the region it occupies allows for no navigable rivers; instead, there are a large number of smaller ones, which often change name from area to area. The continental divide passes through the state, meaning there is drainage toward both the Gulf of Mexico and the Pacific. Most of the drainage toward the Gulf is represented by the Papaloapan and Coatzacoalcos rivers and their tributaries such as the Grande and Salado Rivers. Three rivers account for most of the water headed for the Pacific: the Atoyac River, Mixteco River, and the Tehuantepec River, with their tributaries.

== See also ==
- List of rivers of Mexico
