= San Pedro Ixtlahuaca =

- Municipality and town
- Location in Mexico
- Coordinates: 17°03′N 96°49′W
- Country: Mexico
- State: Oaxaca
- Time zone: UTC-6 (Central Standard Time)

San Pedro Ixtlahuaca is a town and municipality in Oaxaca in southeastern Mexico. It is the fastest growing municipality in Oaxaca in terms of population, with a population change of +113.3% going from the 2010 census to the 2020 census. It is part of the Centro District in the Valles Centrales region.
