= San Agustín de las Juntas =

- Municipality and town
- Location in Mexico
- Coordinates: 17°0′N 96°43′W
- Country: Mexico
- State: Oaxaca

Area
  - Total: 12.76 km^{2} (4.93 sq mi)

Population (2005)
  - Total: 5,645
- Time zone: UTC-6 (Central Standard Time)

San Agustín de las Juntas is a town and municipality in Oaxaca in south-western Mexico. The municipality covers an area of 12.76 km^{2}. It is part of the Centro District in the Valles Centrales region. As of 2005, the municipality had a total population of 5,645.
