= San Raymundo Jalpan =

- Municipality and town
- Location in Mexico
- Coordinates: 16°58′N 96°44′W
- Country: Mexico
- State: Oaxaca
- Time zone: UTC-6 (Central Standard Time)

San Raymundo Jalpan is a town and municipality in Oaxaca in south-western Mexico. The municipality covers an area of km^{2}. It is part of the Centro District in the Valles Centrales region.

As of 2005, the municipality had a total population of .

Zaachila Zapotec (San Raymundo Jalpan Zapotec) is spoken in the town.
