= Santa Lucía del Camino =

Santa Lucia del Camino
- Municipality and town
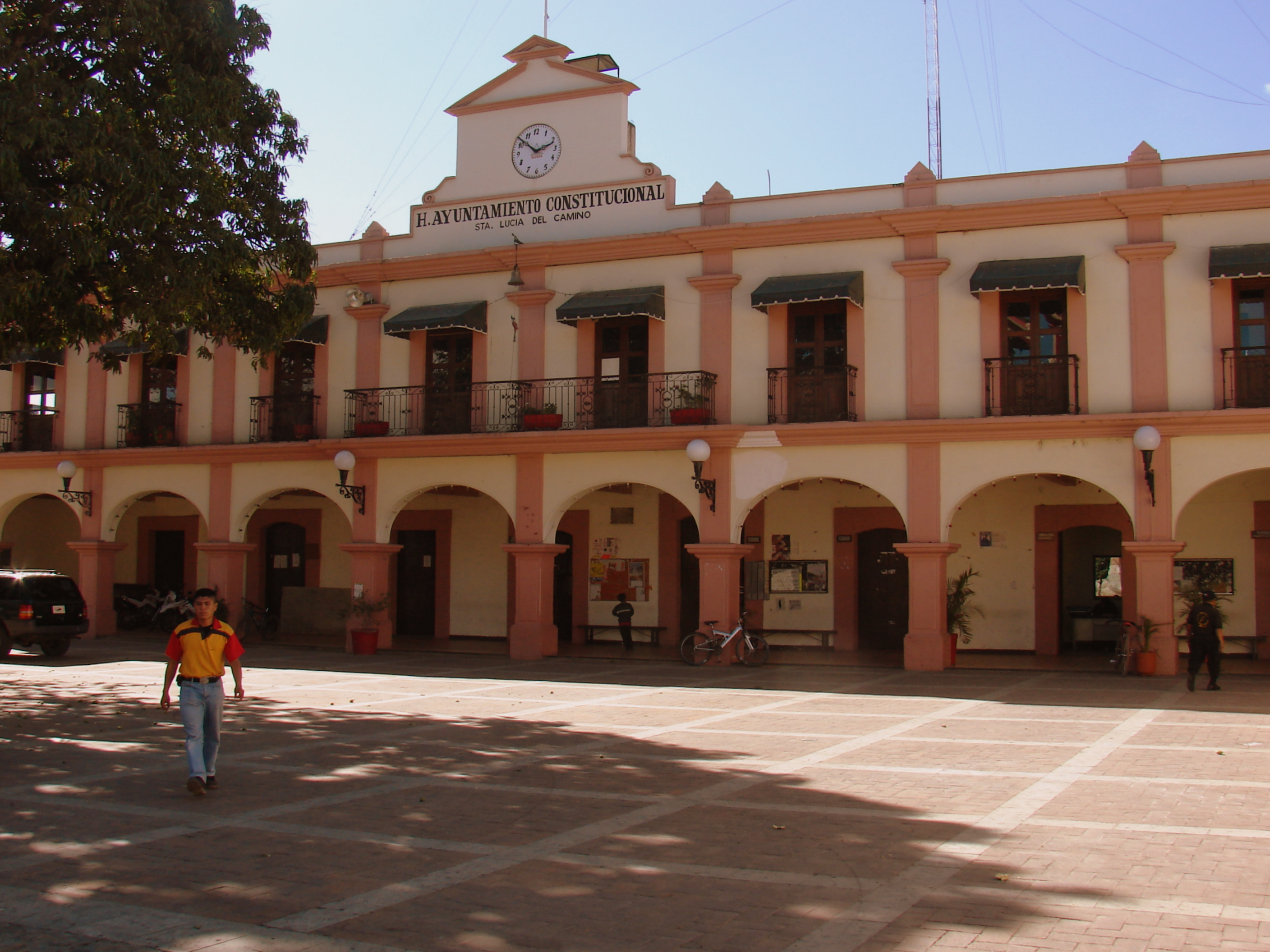
- City Hall of Santa Lucia del Camino

- Location of the municipality in Oaxaca

- Location in Mexico
- Coordinates: 17°04′0″N 96°42′0″W
- Country: Mexico
- State: Oaxaca

Area
  - Total: 9.437 km^{2} (3.644 sq mi)
  - Town: 6.6 km^{2} (2.5 sq mi)

Population (2020 census)
  - Total: 50,362
  - Density: 5,337/km^{2} (13,820/sq mi)
  - Town: 45,895
  - Town density: 7,000/km^{2} (18,000/sq mi)
- Time zone: UTC-6 (Central Standard Time)

Santa Lucía del Camino is a city and its surrounding municipality located in the central part of the Mexican state of Oaxaca and is the second most densely populated municipality in Oaxaca behind Santa Cruz Amilpas. It lies just 3 km east of the state capital city of Oaxaca, within the Oaxaca metropolitan area. It is part of the Centro District in the Valles Centrales region.

The city of Santa Lucía del Camino had a 2005 census population of 42,570 and serves as the municipal seat of the municipality of Santa Lucía del Camino, which has an area of 9.437 km^{2} (3.644 sq mi) and a population of 45,752. The only other community in the small municipality is the town of San Francisco Tutla (population 3,182). The city is the seventh-largest community in the state of Oaxaca in population.

As municipal seat, Santa Lucia del Camino has governing jurisdiction over the village of San Francisco Tutla as well as itself.
