= Ánimas Trujano, Oaxaca =

Animas Trujano
- Municipality and town
- Location of the municipality in Oaxaca

- Location in Mexico
- Coordinates: 16°59′N 96°43′W
- Country: Mexico
- State: Oaxaca

Area
  - Land: 6.7 km^{2} (2.6 sq mi)

Population (2005)
  - Total: 3,189
- Time zone: UTC-6 (Central Standard Time)

Animas Trujano is a town and municipality in Oaxaca in south-western Mexico. The municipality covers an area of 6.7 km^{2}, and it is part of the Centro District in the Valles Centrales region. Its climate is warm most of the time, and the municipal area has a diversity of both animal and plant species. As of 2005, the municipality had a total population of 3,189, the majority of them being Catholic. Approximately 69 people speak an indigenous language, according to the 2005 INEGI census. The origin of the name "Animas Trujano" dates to the times of the Mexican War of Independence. Originally, the municipality was just called "Animas", but people decided to add the word "Trujano" in honor to Valerio Trujano. He spent a little time in Animas, but then he was executed by the Spanish royalist army during the Mexican War of Independence. One of the attractions of Animas Trujano is the "Danza de la Pluma". People also celebrate the feast day of the Virgin of Guadalupe on December 12, a festival in honor of the Virgin of Rosario, the Holy Week and more.

== History ==
This town, along with three other suburbs nearby (Santa María, la Raya and San Bartolo el pequeño), were initially part of a larger municipality called San Bartolo Coyotepec. However, over time, Animas and those three communities separated and eventually became independent. At first, Animas was only inhabited by two or three families who were sent there by San Bartolo in order to work the land. During that time, the owner of an adjacent farm called "Hacienda del Carmen" divided it and gave each of his workers a portion. Because this farm was close to Animas, it and its inhabitants later became a part of it. When Animas' name was changed to "Animas Trujano", the town was not yet a municipality. It became on February 17, 1868, after the Mexican War of Independence, that it was officially recognized as a municipality.

== Culture ==
Animas Trujano has one of the oldest Nineteenth-century churches of Oaxaca, which is recognized as a historical monument. Also, although it is not a big city, it has its own musical band, which plays various songs from different eras. The band is characterized by the fact that its members use wind instruments to produce their music. Besides the variety of celebrations, the municipality provides many kinds of dishes, such as "mole negro," "empanadas" and "tlayudas con asiento". Chocolate, "champurrado" and "atole de granillo" make up the typical beverages of this region.
