= Atoyac River (Oaxaca) =

Coordinates: 16°29′47″N 97°32′18″W

Location
- Country: Mexico

The Atoyac River is a river in Oaxaca, Mexico. The Atoyac flows into the Rio Verde which empties into the Pacific near Laguna Chacahua, in Lagunas de Chacahua National Park, 90 km west of Puerto Escondido. The mountainous terrain of the region it occupies allows for no navigable rivers; instead, there are a large number of smaller ones, which often change name from area to area. The continental divide passes through the state, meaning that there is drainage towards both the Gulf of Mexico and the Pacific Ocean. Most of the drainage towards the Gulf is represented by the Papaloapan and Coatzacoalcos Rivers and their tributaries such as the Grande and Salado Rivers. Three rivers account for most of the water headed for the Pacific: the Mixteco River, Tehuantepec River, and the Atoyac, with their tributaries.

During 1984's Hurricane Odile, eighteen passengers and three crewmen drowned in flooding on the Atoyac River.

== See also ==
- List of rivers of Mexico
