= Santa Cruz Amilpas =

- Municipality and town
- Location in Mexico
- Coordinates: 17°4′N 96°41′W
- Country: Mexico
- State: Oaxaca

Population (2020)
  - Total: 13,200
- Time zone: UTC-6 (Central Standard Time)
- Website: http://www.santacruzamilpas.com

Santa Cruz Amilpas is a town and municipality in Oaxaca in southeastern Mexico and is the second smallest municipality in Oaxaca, only being bigger than Natividad. However, it is also the most densely populated municipality in Oaxaca. The municipality covers an area of 2.27 km^{2}. It is part of the Centro District in the Valles Centrales region. In 2010, the municipality had a population of 10,120.
