= Oaxaca Valley =

Valley in Mexico

Valles Centrales
- Region
- The Valles Centrales in central Oaxaca

- Location within Mexico
- Country: Mexico
- State: Oaxaca
- Largest city: Oaxaca City

Area
  - Total: 7,241 km^{2} (2,796 sq mi)

Population (2020)
  - Total: 1,207,665
- Time zone: UTC-6 (Central Standard Time)

The Central Valleys (Spanish: Valles Centrales) of Oaxaca, also simply known as the Oaxaca Valley, is a geographic region located within the modern-day state of Oaxaca in southeastern Mexico. In an administrative context, it has been defined as comprising the districts of Etla, Centro, Zaachila, Zimatlán, Ocotlán, Tlacolula and Ejutla. The valley, which is located within the Sierra Madre Mountains, is shaped like a distorted and almost upside-down “Y,” with each of its arms bearing specific names: the northwestern Etla arm, the central southern Valle Grande, and the Tlacolula arm to the east. The Oaxaca Valley was home to the Zapotec civilization, one of the earliest complex societies in Mesoamerica, and the later Mixtec culture. A number of important and well-known archaeological sites are found in the Oaxaca Valley, including Monte Albán, Mitla, San José Mogote and Yagul. Today, the capital of the state, the city of Oaxaca, is located in the central portion of the valley.

== History ==
The Zapotec dominated the valley and much of the Oaxacan highlands from the Early Formative through the end of the Classic period. They were succeeded by the Mixtec culture during the Postclassic period.

=== Formative period ===
Prehistoric Caves of Yagul and Mitla in the Central Valley of Oaxaca
UNESCO World Heritage Site
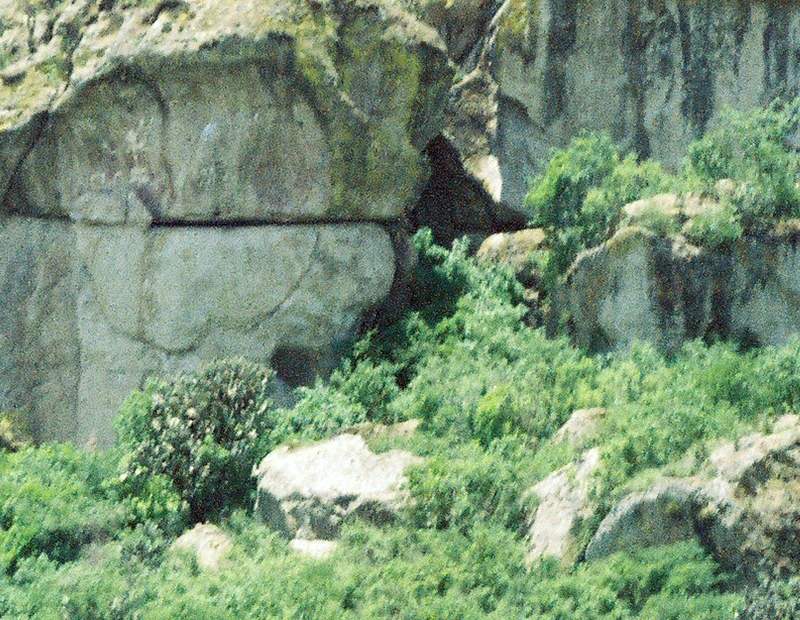
- Guilá Naquitz Cave

- Location within Oaxaca Location within Mexico
- Location: Oaxaca, Mexico
- Criteria: Cultural: (iii)
- Reference: 1352
- Inscription: 2010 (34th Session)
- Area: 1,515.17 ha (3,744.1 acres)
- Buffer zone: 3,859.74 ha (9,537.6 acres)
- Coordinates: 16°57′03″N 96°25′16″W

One of the earliest settlements in the Oaxaca Valley was San José Mogote, located in the northwestern part of the Etla arm. Initially a permanent agricultural village during the Early Formative, it eventually developed social stratification where elite social positions were ascribed, i.e., sociopolitical prominence was achieved at birth, rather than earned.

It is clear that the Formative inhabitants of the valley interacted with the socially complex Olmec culture of the Olmec heartland. It is unclear, however, what effect these interactions had on the development of Zapotec civilization. The Olmec influences on Mesoamerican culture is still under debate.

While San José Mogote functioned as a small center in the northwestern arm of the valley, a number of other contemporaneous centers existed in the Oaxaca Valley. These were Tilcajete in the Valle Grande and Yegüih in the Tlacolula arm. Through the end of the Middle Formative, population in the valley was dispersed and centered around these three separate settlements. Interaction between the three settlement systems was likely high, as a general homogeneity of ceramic styles and iconography is evident.

Substantial cultural changes become evident during the Late Formative, including a dramatic population shift and the political centralization of the valley under the previously uninhabited capital of Monte Albán. There is no evidence that Monte Albán existed as of 600 BC, but by 400 BC the site, which is located atop a 400 m tall artificially leveled mountain and completely lacking in easily accessible water sources, had a population of ca. 5,200. Within 200 years, the settlement's population had grown to approximately 17,200, quickly making it one of the most populous Mesoamerican cities at the time. This inordinate population growth occurred simultaneously with the rapid abandonment of the other major centers occupying the three arms of the Oaxaca Valley (San José Mogote, Tilcajete, and Yegüih). The rapid shift in population and settlement, from dispersed localized centers to a concentration in a previously unsettled area, has been referred to as the “Monte Albán Synoikism” by Marcus and Flannery.

Throughout the remainder of the Late Formative, Monte Albán became the central point of political power and administrative activities in the Oaxaca Valley, forming a state-level society. This Zapotec state subsequently expanded into the Oaxacan highland areas outside of the Oaxaca Valley and towards the Pacific lowlands to the south. As such, it became a prominent regional polity in Mesoamerica.

=== Classic period ===
Throughout the Early Classic period (AD 200–650), Monte Albán and also the Oaxaca Valley formed the nucleus of the Zapotec polity. Interaction with other Classic period polities, specifically Teotihuacan, is evident. Monuments and murals at Monte Albán depict the arrival of visitors from Teotihuacan, while there is evidence that a Zapotec “barrio” existed at the central Mexican city.

Monte Albán's prominence lasted through to the end of the Early Classic. Perhaps too reliant on Teotihuacan, the decline of Monte Albán's influence appears to correlate with the collapse of the Teotihuacan polity. During this time other centers, once subjects of Monte Albán and incorporated within the Zapotec state, began to assert their own autonomy. These include Cuilpan and Zaachila in the Valle Grande and Lambityeco and Mitla in the eastern Tlacolula arm. By the time of the Terminal Classic (ca. AD 900), it is clear that the former capital had been abandoned.

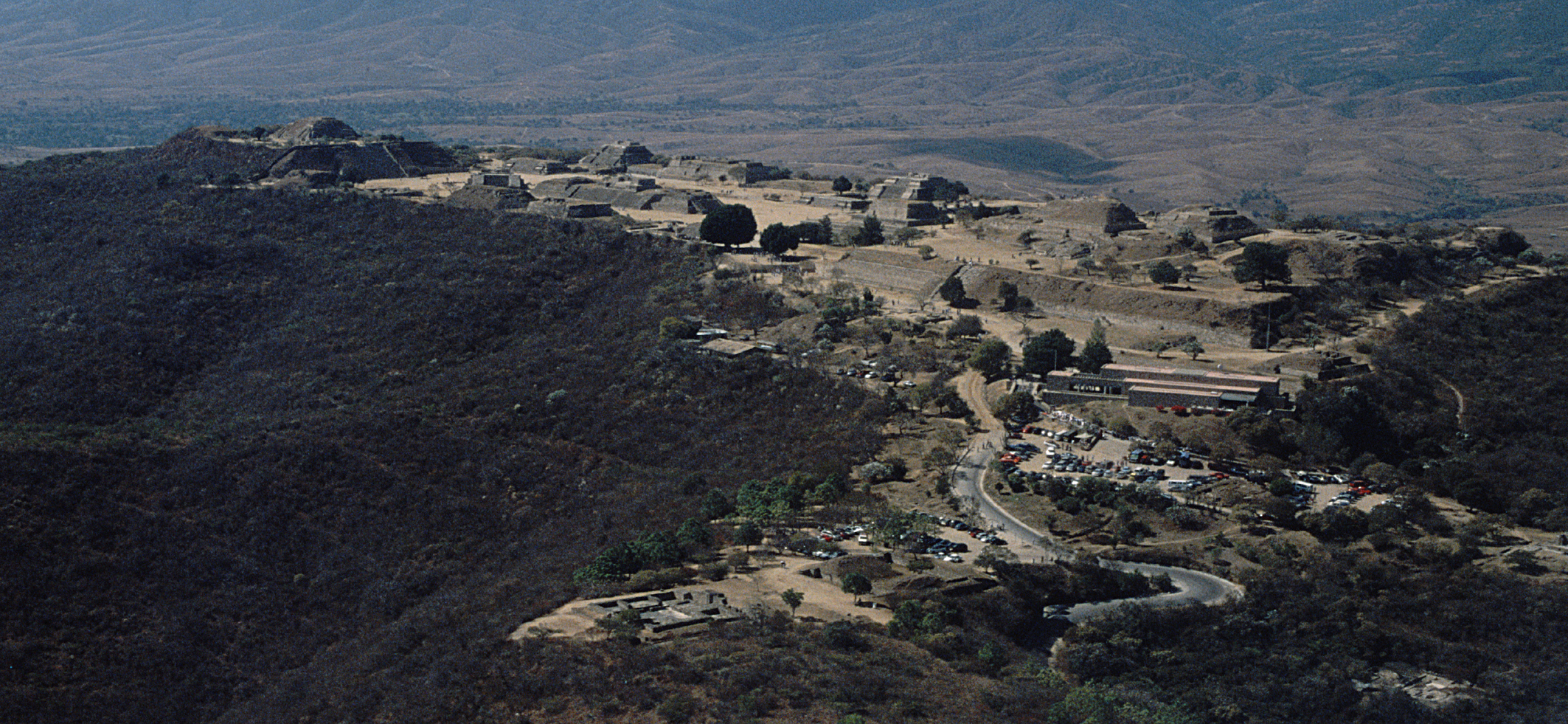
Looking southwest over the site of Monte Albán. Situated on a mountaintop, Monte Albán overlooks much of the Oaxaca Valley.

=== Postclassic period ===
During the Postclassic period (roughly AD 1000–1520), the Oaxaca Valley was still occupied by Zapotec people, but often fell under the political provenience of the Mixtec state, located to the west of the valley. One prominent Mixtec center is found at Mitla, located in the eastern Tlacolula arm. In 1450, the Valley would be invaded by Aztec forces of the Aztec Emperor Moctezuma Ilhuicamina. The Aztecs would conquer the Mixtecs in 1458. In 1486, a fort would be established on the hill of Huaxyácac (now called El Fortín), overlooking the present city of Oaxaca and would become the seat of an Aztec garrison that enforced tribute collection from the Mixtecs and Zapotecs. The Zapotec were likewise conquered by the Aztec under the Emperor Ahuitzotl, between 1497 and 1502. Although, they were not fully conquered. The Mixtecs and Zapotecs allied together and were able to survive. The Oaxaca Valley was subsequently subsumed within the Aztec Empire.

=== Colonial period ===
The Aztec empire collapsed when their capital, Tenochtitlan, fell to the Spanish in August 1521. Several months later, on November 25, 1521, Francisco de Oruzco arrived in the Oaxaca Valley to claim it in the name of the conquistador Hernán Cortés. Cortés, who had been granted Oaxaca as his prize for conquering New Spain by the Spanish crown, was thereafter named Marques del Valle de Oaxaca.

In 1521, the Spanish settled in a community known as Segura de la Frontera, located in the central part of the Oaxaca Valley and approximately 9 km (5.6 mi) east of Monte Albán. Later known as Nueva Antequera, it was officially raised to the category of a "royal" city in 1532 by decree of Emperor Charles V (Carlos I) with the name of Antequera de Guaxaca. Today it is known simply as Oaxaca or Oaxaca de Juárez. Following the initial settlement of this community, the Spanish quickly introduced new agricultural crops and methods of cultivation into the Oaxaca Valley. For example, Cortés ordered the cultivation of wheat in the Etla arm and the construction of mills.

== Largest cities ==
Largest cities or towns in Valles Centrales Region Source: INEGI
Rank		Municipality	Pop.
1	Oaxaca de Juárez	Oaxaca de Juárez	258,913
2	Santa Cruz Xoxocotlán	Santa Cruz Xoxocotlán	81,848
3	Santa Lucía del Camino	Santa Lucía del Camino	45,895
4	Santa María Atzompa	Santa María Atzompa	28,586
5	San Antonio de la Cal	San Antonio de la Cal	24,419
6	San Jacinto Amilpas	San Jacinto Amilpas	16,827
7	Villa de Zaachila	Villa de Zaachila	16,788
8	Ocotlán de Morelos	Ocotlán de Morelos	16,645
9	Vicente Guerrero	Villa de Zaachila	15,910
10	Cuilapan de Guerrero	Cuilapan de Guerrero	15,763

== See also ==
- Oaxaca de Juarez
