= Suchilquitongo =

Suchilquitongo may refer to:

- Suchilquitongo (archaeological site)
- Santiago Suchilquitongo (town and municipality)
- Suchilquitongo Formation
