= Atzompa =

Atzompa may refer to:

- San Gregorio Atzompa, Puebla
- San Juan Atzompa, Puebla
- Santa María Atzompa, Oaxaca
- Soledad Atzompa, Veracruz

== Others ==
- Green glazed pottery of Atzompa (Oaxaca)
