= Santa María Atzompa =

Santa María Atzompa Atzompa
- Town & Municipality
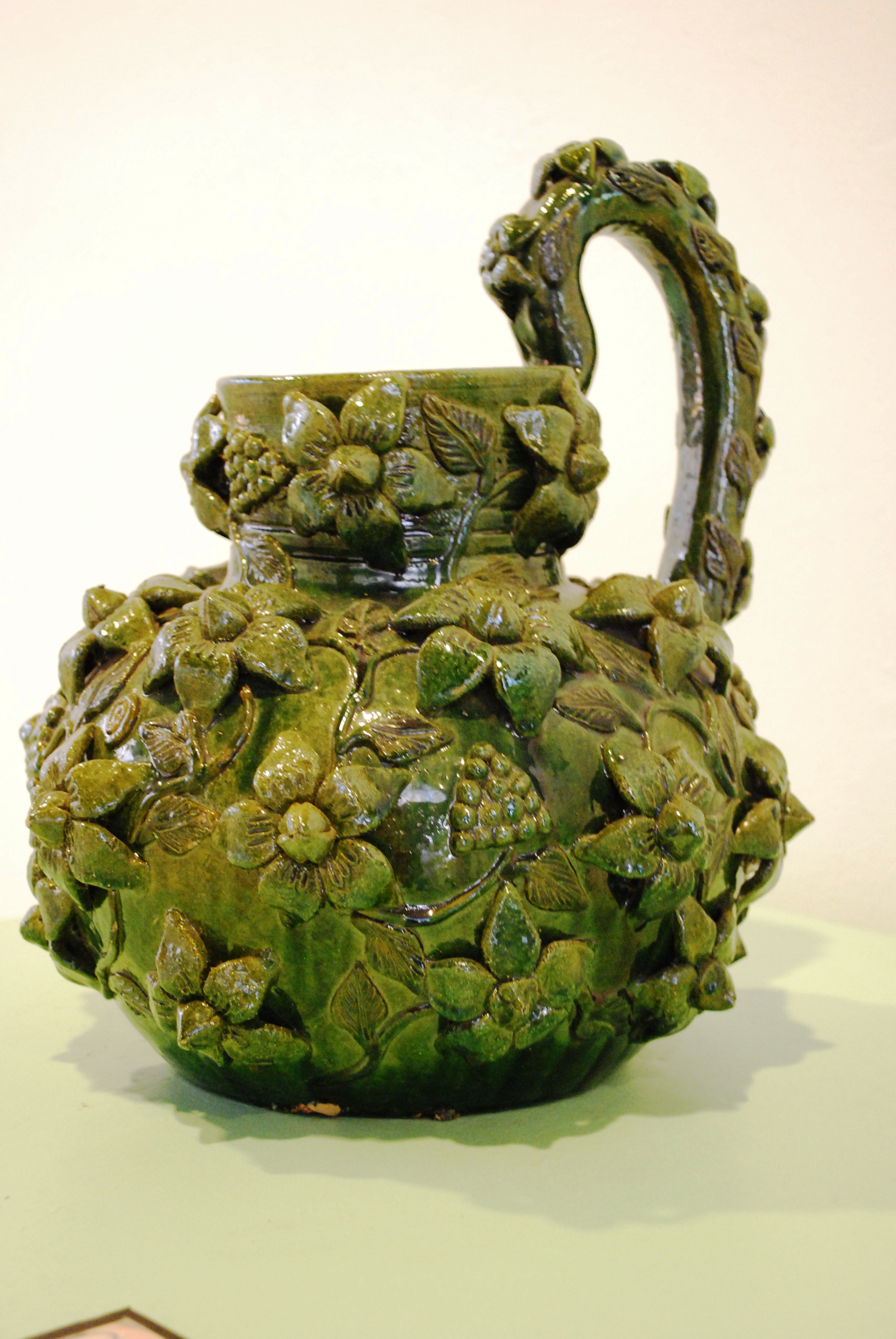
- Sample of Atzompa's signature green glazed ware on display at MEAPO

- Location within Mexico
- Coordinates: 17°06′05″N 96°46′40″W
- Country: Mexico
- State: Oaxaca
- Founded: between the 7th and 9th century

Government
  - Municipal President: Juan Esteban Ortiz Reyes

Area
  - Municipality: 31.3 km^{2} (12.1 sq mi)
  - Seat: 5.69 km^{2} (2.20 sq mi)
- Elevation (of seat): 1,580 m (5,180 ft)

Population (2020 census)
  - Municipality: 41,921
  - Density: 1,340/km^{2} (3,470/sq mi)
  - Seat: 28,586
  - Seat density: 5,020/km^{2} (13,000/sq mi)
- Time zone: UTC-6 (Central (US Central))
- Postal code (of seat): 71220
- Area code: 951

Santa María Atzompa is a town and municipality located in the Mexican state of Oaxaca, about five km from the state capital of Oaxaca. It is part of the Centro District in the Valles Centrales region. The town was founded between the 7th and 9th centuries as a satellite of the ancient Zapotec city of Monte Albán. Since its founding, pottery making has been a major economic activity and the town is currently known for its green-glazed pottery. This pottery used to be shipped all over Mexico and exported to the United States but today most of this pottery is sold locally. Beginning in 2009, there has been excavation at the Atzompa archeological site, leading to the discovery of a 45-meter Mesoamerican ball court, which has been determined to have been on the principal one for Monte Alban. Today, the town is rustic with the smoke of wood-fired pottery kilns ever present. Poverty has been a concern for the town, but innovations such as the use of lead-free glazing and a communal crafts market have been implemented to improve the craft's prospects.

== History ==
The town was founded between 650 and 850 C.E. as a satellite city to Monte Alban, along with other nearby communities such as Cerro del Gallo, El Plumaje, Monte Alban Chico and El Mogollito. These communities were created as a result of the expansion of the large Zapotec city, but were considered to be separate units, rather than neighborhoods of the city proper. The Atzompa community was established on a hill for strategic reasons, overlooking the fertile Valley of Etla below, partly as a bulwark against the neighboring Mixtec. There is also evidence that the town served as the last way station for quarried stone making its way to the construction of the last buildings in the city of Monte Alban. Objects found at the site include local barro negro pottery as well as obsidian and other objects showing trade connections with areas such as Teotihuacan, Sierra de las Navajas in Hidalgo and Guatemala.

Atzompa has been a major producer of pottery since the Monte Alban period. Most of it at that time was the gray pottery typical of the surrounding area although there is a greater diversity of shapes, including jaguar heads and eagle claws. After the Spanish conquest, Santa Maria was added to its native name of Atzompa ("high water mark" in Nahuatl), and lead glazing techniques were introduced in the 16th century. In the mid 20th century, Atzompa was the main producer of ceramics for the region, and its products were shipped to all parts of Mexico and exported to the United States. However, concerns about the lead content in the glaze pummeled the Mexican pottery market. Today, most of the community's distinctive green-glazed pottery is sold in neighboring Oaxaca city, with most families here making a subsistence living through that and by growing corn.

Recently, several innovations have been devised to try to help revive the pottery market. In the 1990s, the Mexican government developed lead-free glazes to be mass marketed. In the 2000s, a cooperative pottery market was created in the town, and the efforts of potter Dolores Porra, who created new designs and colors, has been recognized.

Until the end of the 20th century, only men were permitted to be on the municipal council. The first women were elected to serve in 1999.

== The town ==
The center of the town of Santa Maria Atzompa has a rustic church with two towers, a main plaza with kiosk, one school, and a half built municipal palace in this center. A new crafts market was built here to promote the town's wares. The humble houses are made of adobe and boards and the sidewalks are not paved. All around town, one can see black smoke rising from the pottery kilns firing jars, pots, comals, plates and other dishes. Most of these are sold in the markets of Oaxaca city, but it is also widely available in the streets of the town in makeshift stalls. Foods that can be found in markets here include various moles, barbacoa, tamales, nopal soup, with beef and chicken being the most common meats.

Despite being close to the city of Oaxaca, Atzompa is a very poor community which subsists mostly on the production of its signature green pottery. In very poor neighborhoods such as Colonia Forestal, schools are shacks made from cardboard, wood and boards with dirt floors. Sinks, windows and bathrooms are often missing. These buildings can be very hot or very cold depending on the year and often leak when it rains. In the Colonial Forestal kindergarten, 85 children receive their education in a construction of this type. It was founded in the 1990s, by the Instituto Estatal de Educacion Publica de Oaxaca. The land on which it sits is only loaned to the school.

The town is attracting an increasing number of Mexican and international tourists because of its pottery, which is helping the town's economy. The new crafts market has done much to attract these tourists. The market is not only a central location for the sale of the pottery, it is also set up to allow communal selling of the products and allow the artisans to spend less time selling and more time making pottery. The pieces are labeled as to the artisan and the artisans rotate shifts at the market.

It is a very traditional town which, Sundays are still a day of rest when no pottery is worked on. There are also a large number of celebrations here, the roots of which go back centuries. Weddings are celebrated in the houses of both the bride and the groom, generally taking place on Sunday. On Sunday morning, the groom's parents, accompanied by family, arrive early in the morning to the bride's house with a musical band, flowers and an incense burner. They will accompany the bride to the church. The bride's dress is usually paid for by the groom's family, but if not, the groom's family will sponsor the lunch. The wedding proper takes place after this lunch. After the wedding ceremony, the bride returns home to receive the blessing of her parents, which is celebrated by fireworks. Another meal is served for family and guests. After this, the groom's family brings three or four live turkeys to the bride's house as a symbolic bride price, accompanied by a band. Sometimes this traditional offering is replaced by dishes, clothes, other animals or other gifts. After this, the wedding is further celebrated with drinks and wedding cake. At weddings and other festivals, there is a person designated as the "Chigule." This person is an older, respected member of the community, who acts as a master of ceremonies, asking guests to enjoy the food and beverages prepared for the occasion.

Guelaguetza is celebrated each year in July, with food drink and dance. Las Posadas are celebrated in December with a local style of atole called "champurrado." Carnaval is a two-day celebration here, celebrated at the house of a "mayordomo," who is chosen each year. The mayordomo is in charge of an image called the "Señor del Coro" which is a crucifix to which has been attributed miracles. On the second night, a new mayordomo is chosen for the coming year and when the process is concluded, fireworks are set off to allow the village to know. Then a procession to the new house takes place, bringing food, mezcal and a live turkey.

The feast of Our Lady of the Assumption is celebrated in August, beginning with a novena. Processions are held where youths carry litters adorned with crepe paper, bougainvillea flowers and other things. There are also "fireworks castles" (structures laden with small rockets which move parts), music and a large supper, usually based on beans and rice. On the 15th of August, there is a special Mass, and another communal meal served by the young people of the town. Municipal authorities are present and the evening concludes with a dance and amusement rides.

Holy Week celebrations here are a mixture of Christian and pagan elements. Holy Tuesday is celebrated at home with family and friends. The traditional drink for this day is called "tejate" and is prepared by a designated man and either his mother or his wife. The traditional meal s fish with white beans, with a sweet called "maja blanca" made from ground rice, milk, cinnamon and sugar for dessert. On Holy Thursday, a staging of the Last Supper takes place, which is usually done by the town elders. On Good Friday, streets are cleaned and prepared for Easter Sunday, when the day is celebrated with food, drink and dance on the street. This celebration lasts into Monday.

Day of the Dead celebrations begin on midnight 31 October, when those with deceased loved ones gather in the cemetery to light the tombs with candles and decorate them with Mexican marigolds and other flowers. These people are greeted on the morning of 31 October by municipal authorities who bring a musical band and offer tea and coffee. Religious brotherhoods also arrive with banners and standards. On November 1, the dead continue to be honored in the home, with a traditional meal of mole, tamales and beans. On 2 November, is called the "day of godchildren, "co-parents" (compadres), friends and family" as the dead are often referred to. On this day are eaten bread, hot chocolate and fruit, with the aim of saying goodbye to the deceased who have been visiting. Late in the day, another meal with mezcal or beer may be served.

The Fiesta del Nacimiento (Feast of the Birth) occurs at the house of the mayordomo of a Christ child image. This mayordomo serves for a year and there is a minimum of a five-year wait to be the mayordomo. A daughter of the mayordomo is chosen to sing a lullaby to the image. The event extends from the 24th to the 26th of December. On the 24th, a large number of children gather at the house of the mayordomo to participate in the lullaby. The mayordomo's daughter leads this event and is called the "madrina del Niño Dios" (godmother of the Christ Child). After the lullaby, a meal is served to all the participants, which is usually fish with white beans, hot chocolate and bread. After this, there is a procession in the streets with a musical band towards the church where Mass is held. The 25th and 26th are mostly celebrated at home, with food and drink.

== Green glazed pottery of Atzompa ==
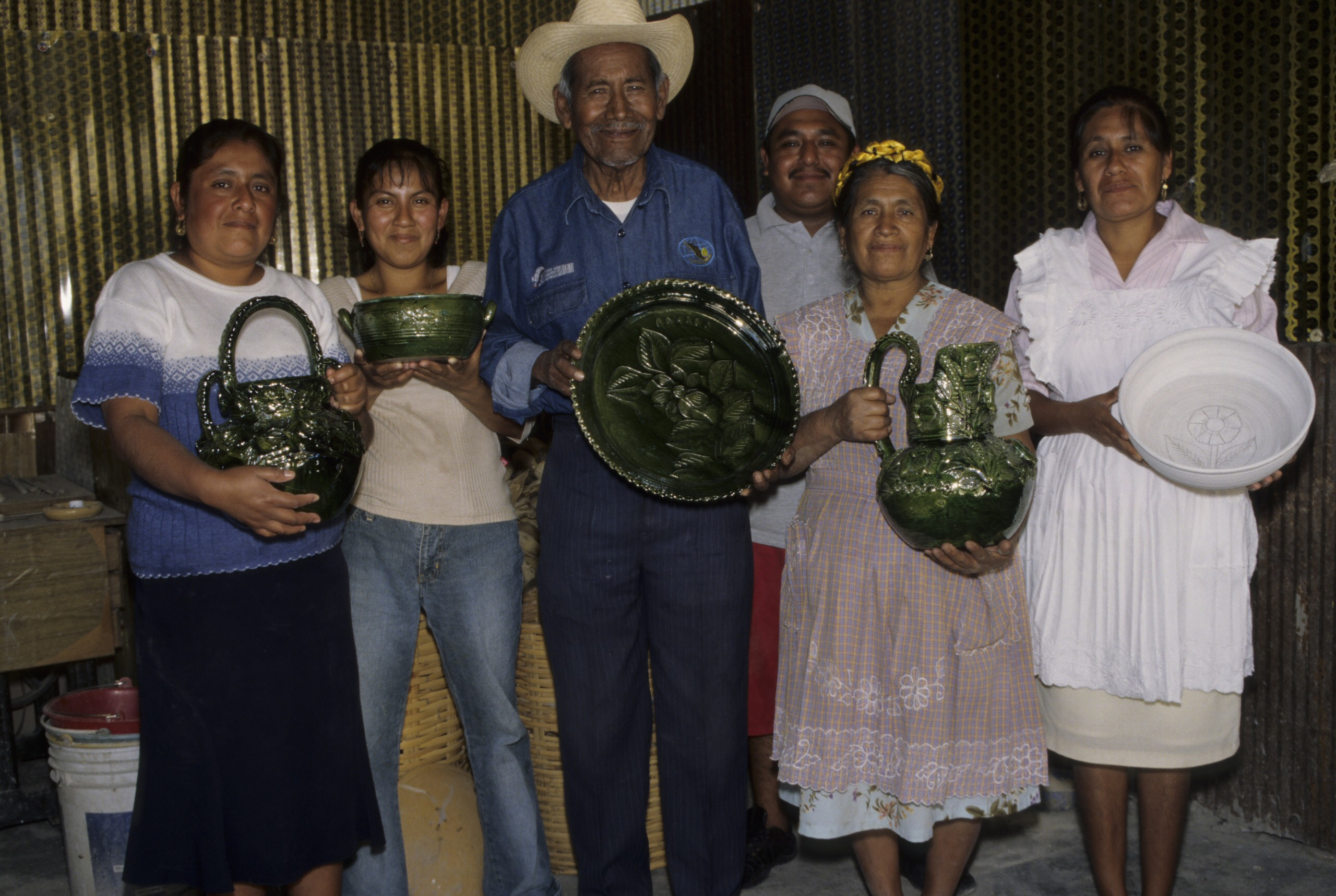
Martin Mario Enriquez Lopez with family and glazed pieces from their workshop

About 90% of the people in the town proper are dedicated to making pottery, making it the basis of the town's economy. Most of this pottery is created for kitchen use such as for cooking, baking and serving. The clay is mined from an area called San Lorenzo Cacautepec, four km from the town center. It is still carried by burro along paths used by the town's grandfathers. After the clay arrives at the workshop, the men break and work to make the clay uniform, mixing it and adding water. All members of the family, including the children work. The potter's wheels are operated by foot, and date back to the pre-Hispanic era. After a piece is molded, it is set aside for eight days before firing. The color and shine is due to the glazing process, which was introduced in the 16th century by cleric Alonso Figueroa and has remained mostly unchanged since then. The first firing with without the glaze, with the pieces emerging in their natural color and can be used in this form. However, very few pieces of this type will sell and sell at a low price. While the glaze is not inexpensive, it has become necessary to make the pottery acceptable to the market. The second firing to harden and adhere the glaze.

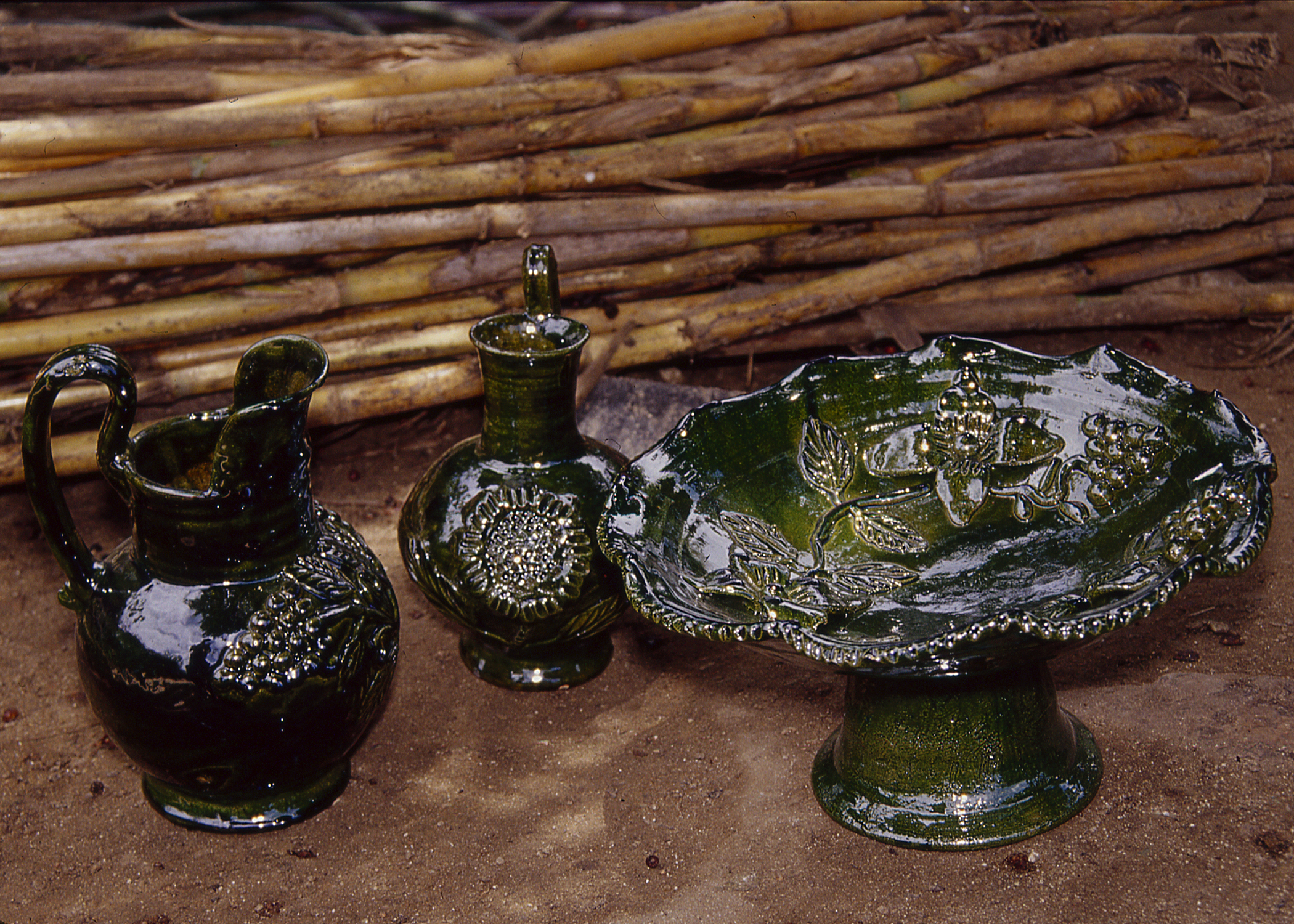
Green glazed ware by the late Guadalupe Aguilar Guerrero

The green color and shine of the pottery is a result of a lead monoxide glaze, which can leach into the foods that the pottery holds. The local people here have been warned of the dangers of the continuous use of the lead pottery but the warnings are unheeded. Studies have shown that people in potters' communities such as Atompa, where lead glaze is used have unusually high levels of the substance in their blood. The exposure comes not only from the making of the pottery, but the use of it to simmer sauces and stews. With time and repeated use, the lead leaches from the glaze into the food. In the 1990s, the Mexican government devised a glaze for pottery which is lead free as a response to lead poisoning problems in the country. A 1995 study showed that 44% of children under five years of age in working-class families had high levels of lead in their bloodstreams. Much of the push towards lead-free pottery has been due to economics rather than health when the U.S. restricted imports of Mexican pottery due to lead concerns. Making pottery is a matter of culture and survival for Atzompa and many other poor communities in Mexico.

While almost all of Atzompa's pottery is of the traditional green-glazed variety, since the 1980s, a potter by the name of Dolores Porras has created the first glazed natural color and multicolored glazed pottery. Porras developed a white translucent glaze on which to paint colors such as bright oranges, blues, greens and yellows. Each of her pieces are done by hand and are decorated with figures such as borders, mermaids, flowers and iguanas. She has been invited to give workshops in the United States, where she learned about lead-free glazes and has applied these to her work. She has not been able to work for the last years due to Parkinson's disease and diminished sight. She remains poor and dependent on her family for support. In 2010, a ceremony to honor her innovative work was organized by the Arden Rothstein of the Friends of Oaxacan Folk Art Association.

== Archeological site ==
Since 2009, archeological work has been taking place in an area just south of the town center. A number of significant constructions have been excavated including structures called the Casa de Oriental (East House) and Casa de Altares (House of the Altars) and the Central Shrine of Atzompa which is larger than its counterpart in Monte Alban proper. Next to these is a complex of domestic units, sunken patios and a pyramidal platform.

However, the main find has been a 45-meter-long Mesoamerican ball court with two smaller courts next to it. These courts are surrounded pyramidal structures. The 45-meter court is the largest ever found in the Monte Alban area and investigations indicate that this was the principal ball court for the city, rather than any of the ball courts that are in the Monte Alban site itself. This ball court is situated such that players would have full view of the city located above them. The two smaller courts are secondary and probably used for training ball players.

The site was initially explored in the 1930s by Jorge Acosta. He was only able to examine the ends of the large ball court. He speculated that the constructions at this site were ceremonial and defensive in nature, constructed in the 7th to 9th centuries to protect a growing Monte Alban. Formal excavation was not considered for the site until recently due to its distance from the main Monte Alban site. The site is still being excavated with plans to open it to the public in 2012. Starting in 2010, work has intensified in building the infrastructure needed for the Santa Maria Atzompa archeological site, to be opened to the public in 2012 as an adjunct to the Monte Alban site. A laboratory and security booths have been built, paid for by the INAH. The laboratory is for the testing and dating of ceramic pieces and other artifacts. Walking paths are being constructed by the state government. The archeological work displaced about 100 people from their homes, but the promise of tourism in the future has satisfied the community. As of November 2012 this site is open to the public.

== The municipality ==
As municipal seat, the town of Santa María Atzompa is the local governing authority for itself and the communities of Montealbán, San Jerónimo Yahuiche, San José Hidalgo, Santa Catarina Montaño, La Soledad, La Cañada, Rancho Concepción, La Cañadita, Loma del Puente, La Raya de Yahuiche, Salida a San Lorenzo, Los Sibaja (Calle del Canal), Colonia Odisea, El Rincón, Paraje Río Chiquito, Loma del Paredón and Paraje Loma de la Virgen. The municipality has a total population of 41,921, of which 28,586 live in the municipal seat. It covers an area of 31.3km^{2}. 1,726 people speak an indigenous language. The municipality borders the municipalities of Guadalupe Etla, San Jacinto Amilpas, San Lorenzo Cacaotepec, San Pablo Etla, San Pedro Ixtlahuaca and Oaxaca de Juárez.

Main elevations include Cerro Apazle, Cerro del Bonete, Cerro de la Golondrina, Loma de San Isidro and Loma del Paderon. There is one river called the Chiquito River, which flows only during the rainy season. It has a temperate climate. Natural vegetation includes jacaranda, guaje, mesquite, white sapote and American pepper. Wildlife includes rabbits, hares, frogs, lizards and a wide variety of birds and insects.

Agriculture employs about 7% of the population, industry, construction and mining 40% and commerce, tourism and services employ 50%.
