= Suchilquitongo (archaeological site) =

Site in Oaxaca, Mexico

Coordinates: 17°15′N 96°53′W

Suchilquitongo is a Mesoamerican archaeological site located in Santiago Suchilquitongo municipality of San Pablo Huitzo in the Etla District of the Valles Centrales region of Oaxaca state in south-western Mexico, some 30 kilometers north of the Oaxaca City on Federal Highway 190.

According to INAH, this archaeological site is locally called Cerro de la Campana, due to the popular belief that in one of its buildings or mounds a gold bell lies buried. Geographical charts assign the locality Cerro la Cantera since even today pink stone is extracted from quarry deposits. This quarry is of high quality and very useful to construct modern buildings.

The site is also known by Huijazoo, which means "war fortress" in the Zapotec Language.

== Historical brief ==
According to the Municipalities Encyclopedia, Suchilquitongo name is a contraction of the Nahuatl word Xochiliquitonco, consisting of Xochitl, "flower", Quilitl (Sp), quelitón, quelite, and Tontli, "diminutive" of Co, "in"; means: "in the flowered quelites".

According to studies conducted by archaeologist Enrique Mendez, this human settlement presumably developed approximately 1000 BCE., becoming part of a social nucleus already properly structured, with a correct social formation, territory and proper government forms, by the year 300 or 400 CE., thus forming the main seat of which was the high guijazoo lordship, with chosen buildings where guijazoo powers sat, forming a horseshoe figure, between the towns of San Pablo Huitzo in the north and Santiago Suchilquitongo to the south.

The latter, where on the “cerro de la campana” is located the famous Tomb number 5, which has been described as the Zapotec art “Sistine Chapel” which in 1985, was a source of controversy among authorities and people of Santiago Suchilquitongo and San Pablo Huitzo, who claimed ownership of the territory where this archaeological jewel is located, rather this dispute arises from a misunderstanding, when it was mentioned that Tomb 5 was found in cerro de la campana. Both Huitzo and Suchilquitongo, by coincidence, each have such a named hill within their respective territories. Suchilquitecos also call their own hill, “El Mogote”, or the Mound of the Old Lady. On the mound a fortress was discovered, decorated with serpents and a figure representing Quetzalcoatl, who was worshiped by Mesoamerican cultures.

However, according to the Municipalities Encyclopedia for San Pablo Huitzo the name in Spanish means “Espinazo” (Ridge). Also Huexolotitlan means place where there are Guajolotes (Turkey). Huexolotl, Turkey; titlan place of. The Zapotec called this town Huijazoo, which means: Atalaya place of warriors.

The historical research of San Pablo Huitzo notes that the town has a history dating back to 1200 BCE. Approximately, history tells us that by the year 1400 CE., the place was known with the Huijazoo name and years later, when it was conquered by the Aztecs, the town was then named Gueixolotitlan and by the 1700s its name was again changed to what is known today.

== Site history ==
As a result of archaeological explorations, constructive evidence, and human occupation evidence suggest that the oldest remains, within the Huitzo municipality, are those of Barrio del Rosario and the latest or more recent evidence is located within the territorial limits of the municipality of Santiago Suchilquitongo. The “Cueva de la Vieja” complex has not yet been explored. It is believed that the settlement evolution dates back to the earliest times of human development in the Oaxaca valleys, since ancient human evidence have been found from 2799 years ago in the known Barrio del Rosario, in Huitzo.

Local historians and some scholars link this site with the mythical Huijazo or Atalaya War where Zapotec defended their country against Mixtec invaders, fact that remains to be documented by the archaeological record.

So far it is not known the year in which this ceremonial center was abandoned.

== The Site ==
The architectural complex is located on the summit of a hill, at a height of 150 meters above the floor of the Valley of Oaxaca, provides an exceptional viewing position, which on a clear day provides a view of up to forty kilometers, with clear air and accurate view.

The site is on a small artificially leveled crest, which allows foundation for eight buildings more than four meters high and with foundation bases of up to 25 m per side. At its apogee, the hill slopes were contained by rough walls which were coated with flattened stucco lime, giving the complex a fortress aspect. During the ascent to the Summit the remains of platforms and smaller buildings as well as steps are notorious; all of them are coated with lime stucco so it is considered that access should have been restricted to common people. Three of the partially restored buildings show simple walls superimposed with recessed stairways against its façade. One is highlighted by lateral stairways main access. Each of the eight buildings has on top, a single room with a short hallway in front. Due to recovered evidence, possibly priests, sorcerers and nobles used them to perform ceremonies, astronomical observations, and human sacrifices. It is deduced by the decorations that some of these buildings had on their facades that such acts perhaps were dedicated to the rain god Cocijo cult.

Future archaeological excavations may verify the hypothesis that each of the eight existing buildings contains internal tombs; this sector may be a necropolis.

The complex longitudinal axis was drawn from east to east, leaving the floors of the three existing plazas at different levels in relation to the sunken patio sunk or ballgame court. The level difference is evident between building 1 platform and the sunken patio floor, 6.50 meters, while the difference between building 3 patio and the floor of the Main Plaza is just 4.6 meters.

== Tomb No. 5 ==
An important finding was made in 1985 with the discovery of tomb 5, located in building 1. Together with the Monte Albán tomb 105, both contemporary, these could be considered as the most beautiful archaeology funeral samples in the Oaxaca region. This tomb is below the building at a depth of about six and a half meters, same elevation of the sunken patio floor in the Center of the complex.

The Tomb was built during the Zapotec culture classical period (650-900 CE)., hence it is about 1240 years old; some scholars believe that it was used at least twice after the Great Lord who originally ordered its construction for his own burial ceremony, known as “Señor 12 Monos (12 monkey) who probably ruled this land. Entrance is down nine steps leading to a hall, that at the time of its discovery was sealed with a large stone block. Two stones carved in bas-relief with the representation of richly dressed priests form the entry, on top is a large monolithic lintel holding a feline head with open jaws, a precious bird head sticks out the mouth.

This realistic representation is framed with abstract God Cocijo elements such as the headdress on the feline as ornament, and symbols of defended mountains, water and force winds to the sides of the head. Is noteworthy that the entire composition is embedded inside of a double scapular panel, which except in exceptional cases, only was used as a decorative element of the facades of monumental buildings of the classic period in the valleys of Oaxaca.

Past the portico is the antechamber, which resembles a courtyard flanked by two niches with east and west lintels, communicating the main burial chamber by three short steps which are inserted on a pair of double scapular boards. Each of the existing room spaces has finely bas-reliefs carved jambs painted red, representing governing couples preceding the rule of “12 mono”. The antechamber walls are painted with frescos from the ceremony of burial of the original Tomb; ceremony attended by warriors, priests, whiners (plañideras), musicians, sorcerers and fantastic characters, as well as ballgame players, all of this with a polychromy handling never seen in similar funerary representation.

The access lintel to the main chamber is richly decorated with a character who wearing a helmet with God Cocijo attributes and the symbol of “bundle of years” that some wish to identify with the intertwined triangles that prehispanic astronomers used in their measurements. Both described lintels decorations were made in fine stone masonry coated with lime plaster. Red dominates all antechamber space, as representing death for the Zapotec.

The burial chamber is a masonry decorated rectangle with frescos from the Lords of the villages under the domination of “12 mono” at the time of his death and at least sixteen individuals dressed as ballgame players, some with the helmet in hand and preceded by a couple of warriors.

At the back of the camera is a fine bas-relief carved stonework piece, painted red representing the transmission charge from “12 Mono” parents; “11 movimiento” and lady “4 turquesa”, made in favor of his son and his wife then, lady “10 Mono”. The magnificent carving of face details of the represented characters is striking, as well as their clothing and furnishings used to sit, particularly those used by the main character, located in the far right of the top box of the tombstone.

The archaeological site of the Cerro de la Campana lacks public services at the time. In the Centre of the village of Santiago Suchilquitongo, visitors can visit the Community Museum that has a replica of 5 Tomb, as well as some of the pieces found in the interior.

Tomb 5 is closed to the public due to the fragile nature of the paintings contained within. It can be entered only enter with INAH permission.

== Site Museum ==
The archaeological site lacks public services. In the Centre of the village of Santiago Suchilquitongo, is a Community Museum that has a replica of Tomb 5, as well as some of the pieces found in its interior. In San Pablo Huitzo, is another small museum with prehispanic items and colonial religious art.

== Huijazoo site Orientation ==
George Noel DeLange, Jr (1940—2021) an amateur astronomer, high school science and history teacher by profession, noticed one unusual alignment, the entire plan of this city seems to be on a very different alignment than most of the cities in Mesoamerica. It seems to be aligned on a SE to NW alignment. He suspects that alignment may have been to the solstices rather than to equinox, as most of the Mesoamerican cities show.

== See also ==
- Santiago Suchilquitongo
- San Pablo Huitzio Municipality
