= Villa de Etla =

- Town and municipality
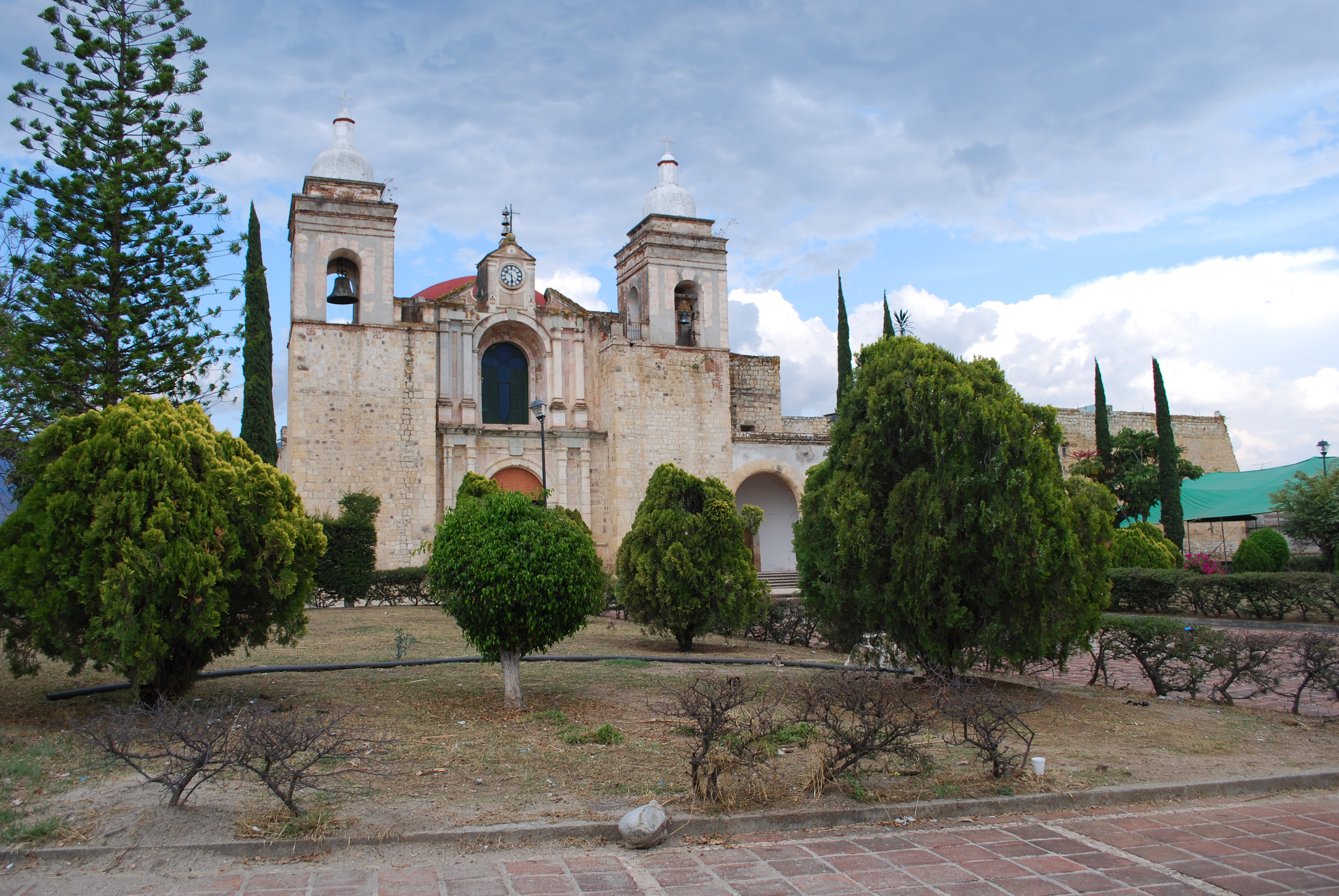
- Church of San Pedro y San Pablo

- Location in Mexico
- Coordinates: 17°12′27″N 96°48′00″W
- Country: Mexico
- State: Oaxaca
- Founded: 15th century

Government
  - Municipal President: Tomas Luis Gonzáles Luna

Area
  - Municipality: 17.86 km^{2} (6.90 sq mi)
- Elevation: 1,660 m (5,450 ft)

Population (2005)Municipality
  - Municipality: 7,637
  - Seat: 6,486
- Time zone: UTC-6 (Central (US Central))
- Postal code (of seat): 68200

Villa de Etla is a town and municipality located in the Mexican state of Oaxaca. It is located in the far northwestern part of the Central Valley of Oaxaca, about seventeen km from the capital. The town is centered on the church and former monastery of San Pedro y San Pablo, and as municipal seat functions as the local government for six other communities. Most of the town's history has been lost due to the lack of records, but oral tradition states that it was founded sometime in the 15th century. Today, the town is noted for its weekly Wednesday market, where one can find traditional merchandise such a local variety of white cheese, tamales, frames for donkeys and goat barbacoa prepared in an earthen oven.

== The town ==
The town of Villa de Etla is centered on the church and former monastery of San Pedro y San Pablo, with the layout of the original streets of the town marked off from it. The complex was completed in 1636 and consists of three parts, the church, the former monastery and the cloister, all constructed from green sandstone. The main portal of the church has a simple arch over which is the choir window. Over this is a pediment which contains a clock. Behind the monastery area, there are the remains of an aqueduct. This arched construction was one of the first built in the area and was used during the colonial period to provide water to the town from the surrounding mountains. It is not known when the aqueduct was built but it was probably completed by the end of the 16th century. The church is one of a series of churches and monasteries which were established by the Dominicans between the city of Oaxaca and the Puebla border in the 16th century. Today this path is the main highway to the city of Puebla and the church is grouped with those from Yanhuitlán, Teposcolula and Coixtlahuaca . There is one other significant church in the town but it is unknown when it was constructed.

The other two important constructions are next to this complex, the municipal market, behind which is the municipal palace, or government office. The municipal market is the center of most of the municipality's commerce, with efforts to build larger commercial stores opposed by many residents. The market is the center for the weekly tianguis or open-air market held on Wednesdays. The Wednesday market is part of an informal system of weekly markets that occur in most of the larger communities of the Central Valleys region. This market is best known for its locally produced variety of white cheese, but it also offers a number of kinds of traditional merchandise such as sheepskins, frames for packing donkeys, the green glazed pottery of Atzompa and tamales. Another specialty is goat barbacoa cooked in earthen ovens.

The main festival for the municipality is in the seat in honor of Saints Peter and Paul. This event begins with processions along the main streets to announce the start, just before the actual feast day. Then on the day before, a very large frame loaded with fireworks, called a castillo (castle) along with smaller bull figures called toritos are set alight. On the main day, there are masses and other religious observances ending with a large public dance.

Lent is an important time in the state of Oaxaca, with many communities developing various types of celebration over these forty days. As Villa de Etla already experiences warm weather by this time, flavored drinks sold by street vendors are popular during the processions, masses and other events held during this time. Some typical flavors served include horchata, hibiscus tea, drinks made from coconuts, a fermented corn drink called tejate and one made from a sweet squash from the area called chilacayota. These are often offered to participants in the various events.

The Viernes de Cuaresma attracts a large number of visitors from around the area. It is marked by a large fair, with about forty amusement rides for children, and musical events. There are over 100 stands selling food and other commodities. The event begins with a music band wandering the streets of the town at 9 pm followed by the setting off of fireworks fastened to a large wooden frame called a castillo (castle). The following day is dedicated to the Christ image called the Señor de las Peñas with more music and fireworks. It ends on Sunday with dancing to popular music. Hundreds from Oaxaca and as far as Puebla, Chiapas and Mexico City come to honor the Señor de las Peñas to keep promises and to ask for favors. The fifth Friday of Lent is dedicated to this image. The festivities are arranged by a committee which is selected each year under Usos y Costumbres.

The fourth Friday of Lent, three weeks before Good Friday, is the La Samaritana celebration. Large ceramic pots are placed and decorated. Some are decorated with bricks but most have imitations, and then arches of palm fronds with bougainvillea flowers are then placed. The tradition is derived from a passage in the Bible in which a Samaritan offers water from a well to Jesus.

Palm Sunday celebrations begin a day before when elaborate figures made of palm fronds are made to be blessed at mass the following day. The figures vary in size and complexity and are often decorated with crosses, pins and flowers. Those who do not make their own palm arrangements buy them from stands located in and around the main church. These are then kept for the remainder of the year to protect the home. During mass, eight young men are chosen to read different Biblical passages related to the Passion of Christ. They are dressed in white tunics, with wreaths on their head to represent Christ. Afterwards, it is traditional to go to the municipal market next door to buy provisions for that day's supper. This includes a bread called “pan Amarillo" cheese, honey, ice cream, tamales, tasajo, tlayudas, tortillas, fruits and flowers.

At these and other events, the most common music is produced by wind instruments and the most common dance is the jarabe, especially at weddings. The most commons foods include mole (especially amarillo, verde, and coloradito), regional sweets, tlayudas, barbacoa and fava beans, accompanying by tepache, mezcal and beer.

== The municipality ==
As municipal seat, the town of Villa de Etla is the local government for six other communities, but most people live in the town proper. These communities together occupy a territory of 17.85km^{2} and are bordered by the municipalities of Asunción Etla, Santo Domingo Etla, San Miguel Etla and Reyes Etla. The municipality is located in the Central Valleys region of the state about seventeen km from the capital of Oaxaca. The municipal government consists of a municipal president, an officer called a “síndico” and four secretaries called “regidors” (for taxes, education, public works and agencies/neighborhoods). These and other officials are elected under Mexico's usos y costumbres system. As of 2005, only 621 people out of a population of 7,637 spoke an indigenous language. Most are Catholic but about a sixth belong to another or no faith.

As of 2005, there were a total of 1691 homes almost all of which were owned by their occupants. Of these homes, 61% have running water, 95% are in areas with public lighting and 49% have public drainage. Federal Highway 190 passes through the municipality connecting it to the city of Oaxaca and Mexico City.

About seventy percent of the municipality's population is dedicated wholly or in part to agriculture, with the primary livestock being cattle. However, only eight percent are dedicated to it full-time. About thirty six percent work in industry, mining and construction. The main handcraft is basketry. About fifteen percent are dedicated to commerce, most of which is related to the sale of dairy products such as milk and cheese. Other commerce focuses on local needs, with the municipal market and the weekly market having a primary role. The total percentage dedicated to commerce, tourism and services is 53%.

The municipality has several preschools, primary schools along with center for study at the high school level. Villa de Etla is the head of the twenty eight schools of Scholastic Zone Number 5. Preschools include Ignacio José Allende, Jaime Torres Bodet, Leona Vicario, Niños Heroes de Chapultepec, Ovidio Decroly, Porfirio Díaz and Prodei Modulo 2. Primary schools include Basilio e Zarate, Cuauhtémoc, Iep 13 General de Division Ignacio Mejia, José María Morelos, Juan de la Barrera, Margarita Maza de Juarez, Ricardo Flores Magon and Valentin Gomez Farias. Secondary education is provided at Escuela Secundaria Technica 84. Special education schools include Centro de Atencion Multiple 26 and Unidad de Servicios de Apoyo a la Educación Regular No. 19. High school level instruction is found at the Centro de Estudios de Bachillerato 6/12. All schools and other centers of instruction are public. The Basilio E. Zárate School celebrated its fiftieth anniversary in 2007. It is the largest and oldest primary school in the area, with a number of students receiving awards in the arts and academics. The school began with classes held at private homes and in makeshift constructions. The current building was eventually financed with support from local, state and federal governments. Maintenance is paid for by students’ parents. There are currently about 500 students from the first to sixth grades with a number receiving special educations services from the Unidad de Servicios Educativos Especiales del Instituto Estatal de Educación Pública de Oaxaca. It also has a social worker, a psychologist and a speech therapist. It recently installed a multimedia room.

In addition to the monastery complex in the main town, an excavated archeological site is another of the municipality's monuments. The archeological zone was first occupied during the Monte Albán IIIA phase and grew during IIIB to about 2,500 people. From 700 to 450 BCE, it dominated the local area, becoming the most important site of the Valley of Etla. It was abandoned between 650–800 CE, or Monte Albán IV.

== Geography ==
The municipality is located in the Valley of Etla, which is a sub-valley located in the far northwest of the Valley of Oaxaca. The municipality lies on a valley floor so its terrain is relatively flat with no significant elevations other than small hills. Almost all of the land in the area is used for agriculture or human habitation. The major rivers are the Asunción which flows through the community of Nativitas Etla and the Salinas River when crosses through Santo Domingo Barrio Alto and Santo Domingo Bajo Etla. It has a temperate climate.

=== Flora and fauna ===
Almost all of the vegetation in the municipality is secondary with decorative species such as geraniums, bougainvillea; trees such as laurel and eucalyptus, and various edible and medicinal herbs. Wildlife mostly consists of bird species such as doves and hummingbirds, various insects, along with some aquatic species such as frogs, fish and crab and reptiles such as lizards, small turtles and snakes. Mammals are all domesticated species.

== History ==
The name means “town of the land of beans” mixing Spanish and Nahuatl. “Villa” is from Spanish and means “town” and “Etla” comes from Nahuatl meaning in “land of beans.” The Zapotec name for the area is Loohvana, which refers to the land's fertility.

Most of the history of this town has been lost due to the lack of records. Oral tradition states that the settlement was founded sometime in the 15th century. The decisive Battle of La Carbonera was fought on October 18, 1866 near to Etla during the war caused by the French intervention in Mexico.

The last few years of the municipality has been marked by political instability. This has negatively impacted public works such as the repaving of roads, electrification and a non functioning water treatment plant, with delays as long as 15 years. In 2008, Federal Highway 190 and the main entrance to town were blocked by those protesting the lack of potable water for three months in 2008. The protesters claimed they had running water irregularly only about once a week and sometimes not even that. In 2010, a group of over a hundred residents took over the municipal palace to force the state government to reinstitute Alma Delia Ramos as municipal president. A previous first takeover ended peacefully but without the desired results of the protestors. The latest protests and blockades have centered on the government of Danial Ramírez Ramírez from April to May 2011. This municipal president has been accused of nepotism, putting family and friends on municipal payrolls for no work. He has also been accused of threatening the homes and lives of those who oppose him. Protestors have principally called for and received state-led investigations into the matter, in order to avoid escalation. There have been various incidents over these two months from the blocking of Federal Highway 190, to the blocking of all six main entrances to the town to the takeover of the municipal palace. However, there have been other demands by protestors such as the stop to the construction of a “Súper Precio” commercial center which they say would negatively affect about 300 local merchants.
