= Atatlahuca =

Atatlahuca (Atatláhuca) may refer to:

- San Esteban Atatlahuca
- San Juan Bautista Atatlahuca
- Atatláhuca–San Miguel Mixtec language
