= Etla District =

- District
- Oaxaca regions and districts: Valles Centrales in center
- Coordinates: 17°12′27″N 96°48′00″W
- Country: Mexico
- State: Oaxaca

Population (2020)
  - Total: 156,240

Etla District is located in the north of the Valles Centrales Region of the State of Oaxaca, Mexico.

== Municipalities ==
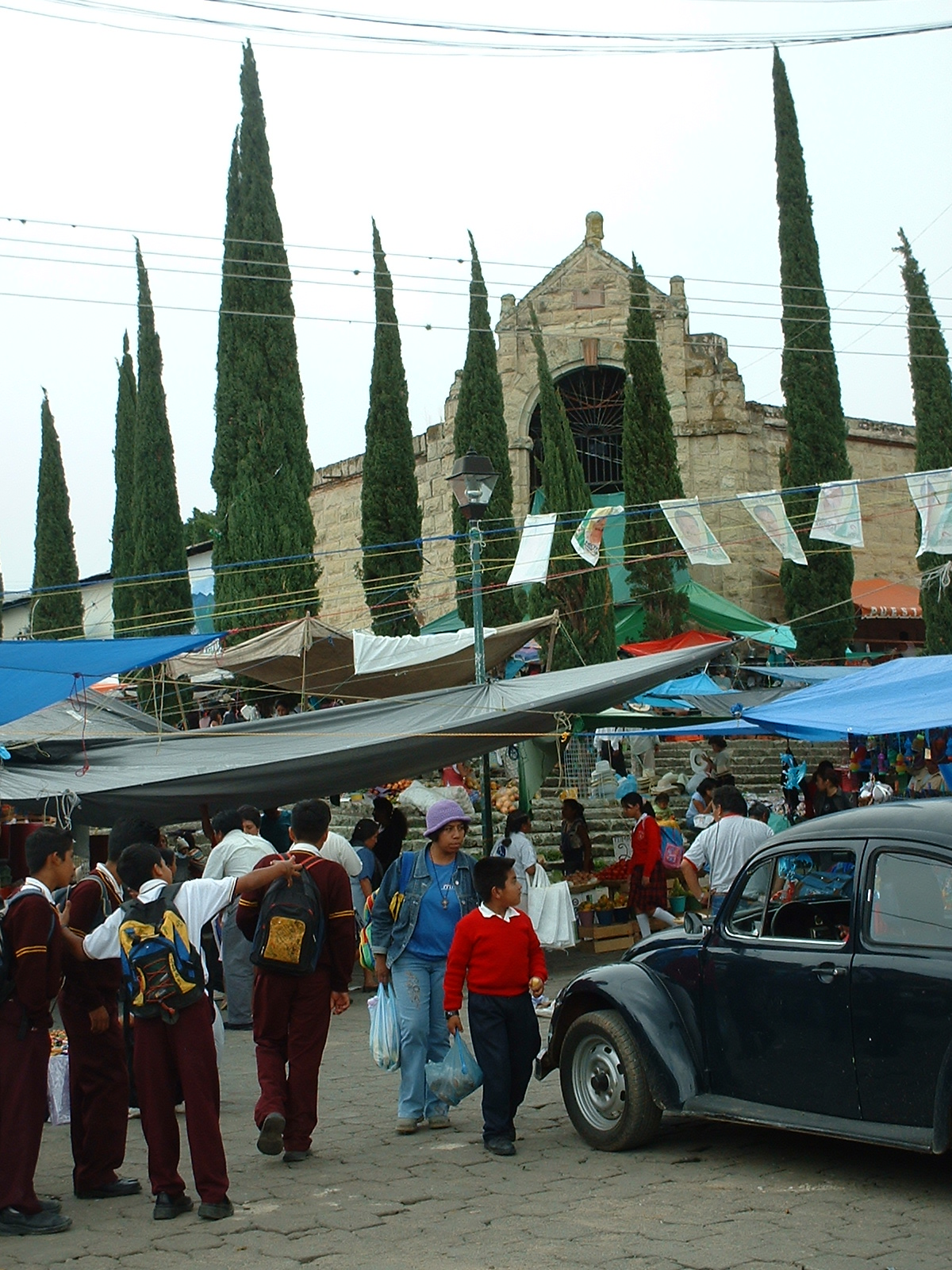
Tented market and covered market building in the town of Etla

The district includes the following municipalities:

Municipality code	Name	Population		Land Area			Population density	
Municipality code	Name	2020	Rank	km^{2}	sq mi	Rank	2020	Rank
033	Guadalupe Etla	2,929	17	4.283	1.654	23	684/km^{2} (1,771/sq mi)	3
045	Magdalena Apasco	7,888	8	26.97	10.41	18	292/km^{2} (758/sq mi)	8
063	Nazareno Etla	4,293	15	4.284	1.654	22	1,002/km^{2} (2,595/sq mi)	2
077	Reyes Etla	4,370	14	11.97	4.62	20	365/km^{2} (946/sq mi)	7
084	San Agustín Etla	4,168	16	55.14	21.29	13	76/km^{2} (196/sq mi)	14
102	San Andrés Zautla	5,326	13	69.38	26.79	11	77/km^{2} (199/sq mi)	13
135	San Felipe Tejalapam	8,321	7	99.37	38.37	9	84/km^{2} (217/sq mi)	12
150	San Francisco Telixtlahuaca	13,856	3	192.9	74.5	4	72/km^{2} (186/sq mi)	15
161	San Jerónimo Sosola	2,730	19	220.1	85.0	3	12/km^{2} (32/sq mi)	22
175	San Juan Bautista Atatlahuca	1,424	23	421.6	162.8	1	3/km^{2} (9/sq mi)	23
178	San Juan Bautista Guelache	6,692	10	52.12	20.12	14	128/km^{2} (333/sq mi)	9
179	San Juan Bautista Jayacatlán	1,447	22	114.4	44.2	6	13/km^{2} (33/sq mi)	21
193	San Juan del Estado	2,807	18	132.1	51.0	5	21/km^{2} (55/sq mi)	19
227	San Lorenzo Cacaotepec	18,339	1	27.60	10.66	17	664/km^{2} (1,721/sq mi)	4
293	San Pablo Etla	17,166	2	44.37	17.13	15	387/km^{2} (1,002/sq mi)	6
294	San Pablo Huitzo	7,035	9	101.5	39.2	8	69/km^{2} (180/sq mi)	16
426	Santa María Peñoles	8,967	6	233.2	90.0	2	38/km^{2} (100/sq mi)	18
483	Santiago Suchilquitongo	10,886	4	95.47	36.86	10	114/km^{2} (295/sq mi)	10
487	Santiago Tenango	1,966	21	109.1	42.1	7	18/km^{2} (47/sq mi)	20
494	Santiago Tlazoyaltepec	6,300	12	63.09	24.36	12	100/km^{2} (259/sq mi)	11
531	Santo Tomás Mazaltepec	2,621	20	44	17	16	60/km^{2} (154/sq mi)	17
539	Soledad Etla	6,348	11	12.47	4.81	19	509/km^{2} (1,318/sq mi)	5
338	Villa de Etla	10,361	5	8.248	3.185	21	1,256/km^{2} (3,253/sq mi)	1
	Distrito Etla	156,240	—	2,144	827.80	—	73/km^{2} (189/sq mi)	—
Source: INEGI

=== Largest cities ===
Largest cities or towns in Etla Distric Source:
Rank		Municipality	Pop.
1	San Francisco Telixtlahuaca	San Francisco Telixtlahuaca	12,474
2	San Lorenzo Cacaotepec	San Lorenzo Cacaotepec	10,465
3	Santiago Suchilquitongo	Santiago Suchilquitongo	8,273
4	Villa de Etla	Villa de Etla	7,997
5	Hacienda Blanca	San Pablo Etla	7,191
6	San Pablo Huitzo	San Pablo Huitzo	6,072
7	San Pablo Etla	San Pablo Etla	4,703
8	Nazareno Etla	Nazareno Etla	4,205
9	Soledad Etla	Soledad Etla	4,170
10	San Agustín Etla	San Agustín Etla	4,168

== See also ==
- Municipalities of Oaxaca
