= San Andrés Huayapam =

- Municipality and town
- Location in Mexico
- Coordinates: 17°06′N 96°40′W
- Country: Mexico
- State: Oaxaca

Area
  - Total: 14.03 km^{2} (5.42 sq mi)

Population (2005)
  - Total: 4,508
- Time zone: UTC-6 (Central Standard Time)

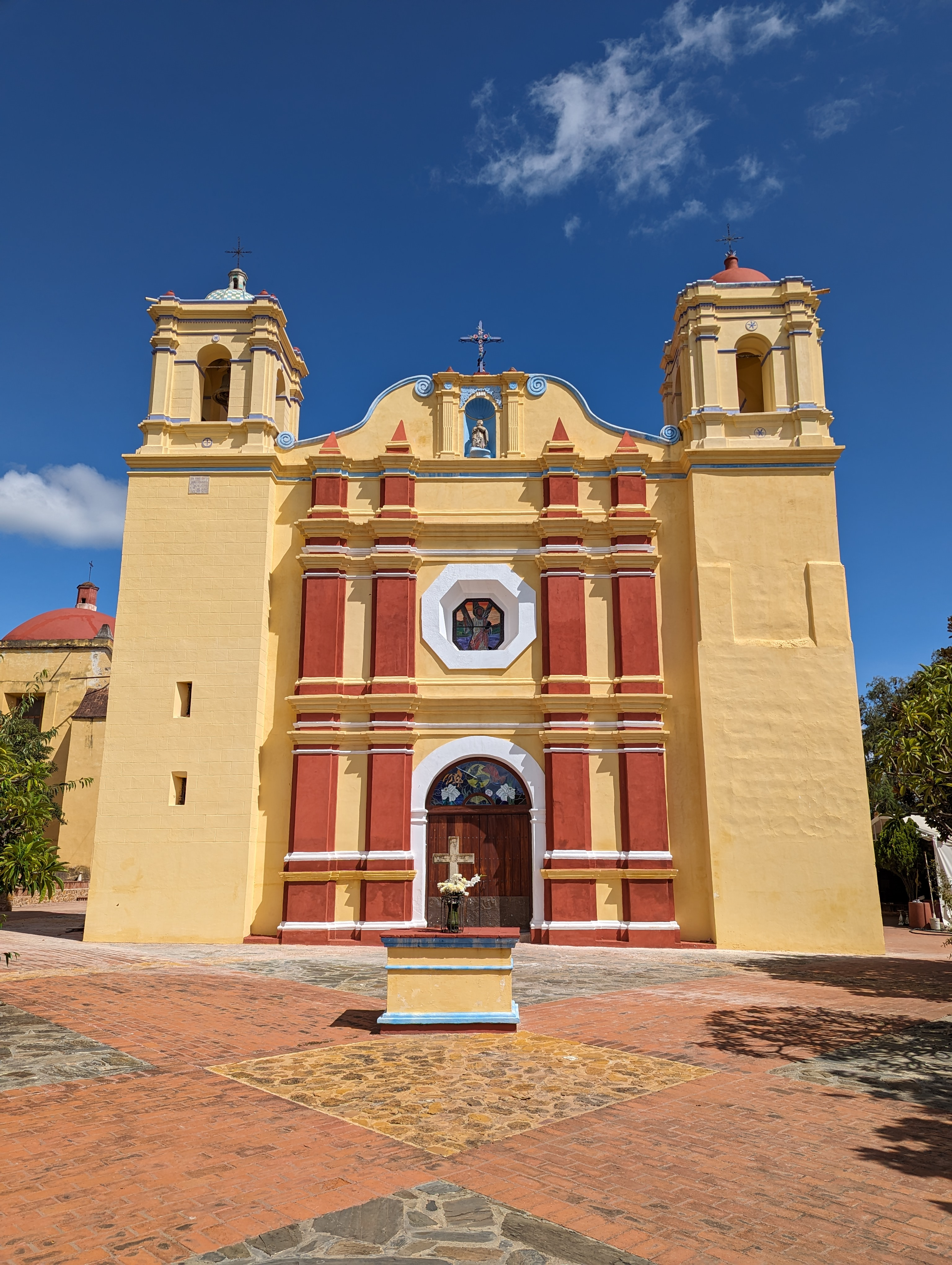
The church of San Andrés Huayapam, Oaxaca.

San Andrés Huayapam is a town and municipality in Oaxaca in south-western Mexico. The municipality covers an area of 14.03 km^{2}. It is part of the Centro District in the Valles Centrales region. Huayapam makes up part of the IV Federal Electoral District of Oaxaca. As of 2005, the municipality had a total population of 4,508. The municipality includes part of the Benito Juárez National Park.
