= Santiago Suchilquitongo =

Coordinates: 17°15′N 96°53′W

- Municipality and town
- Interactive map of Santiago Suchilquitongo
- Country: Mexico
- State: Oaxaca

Area
  - Total: 44.65 km^{2} (17.24 sq mi)
- Elevation: 1,670 m (5,480 ft)

Population (2005)
  - Total: 8,518
- Time zone: UTC-6 (Central Standard Time)

Santiago Suchilquitongo is a town and municipality in Oaxaca in south-western Mexico. The municipality covers an area of 44.65 km^{2}. It is part of the Etla District in the Valles Centrales region. As of 2005, the municipality had a total population of 8,518.

== See also ==
- Suchilquitongo (archaeological site)
- San Pablo Huitzo
