= San Agustín Etla =

- Municipality and town
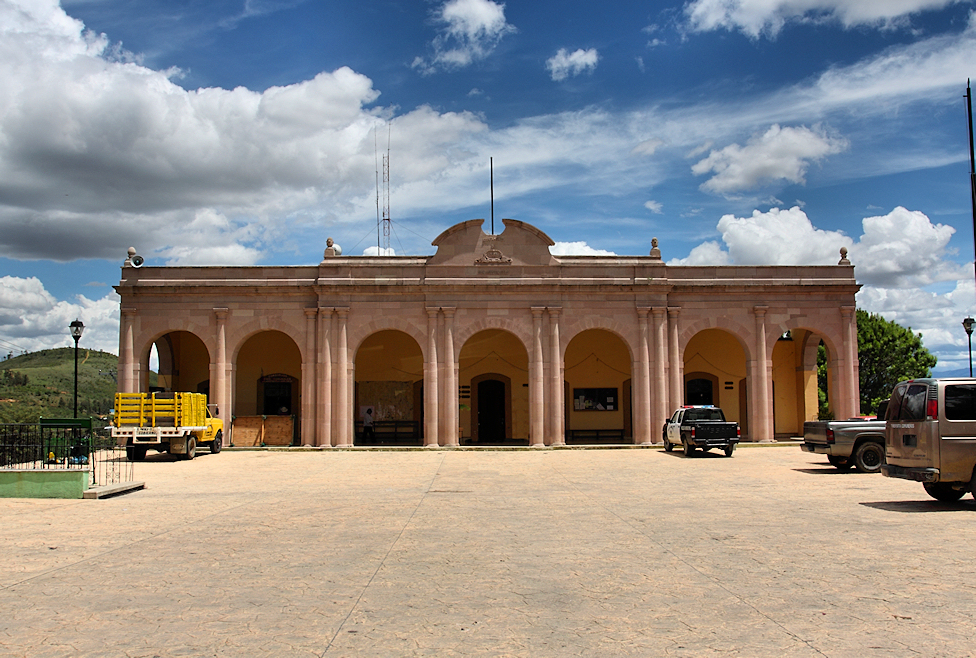
- San Agustín Etla's City Hall

- Location in Mexico
- Coordinates: 17°11′N 96°46′W
- Country: Mexico
- State: Oaxaca
- Founded: 1583

Area
  - Total: 81.65 km^{2} (31.53 sq mi)
- Elevation: 1,700 m (5,600 ft)

Population (2005)
  - Total: 3,243
- Time zone: UTC-6 (Central Standard Time)

San Agustín Etla is a town and municipality in Oaxaca in south-western Mexico. The municipality covers an area of 81.65 km^{2}. It is part of the Etla District in the Valles Centrales region. As of 2005, the municipality had a total population of 3,243.

San Agustín Etla is the home of the Centro de las Artes San Agustín Etla, also known as CaSa. The town hosts a lively Day of the Dead celebration each year on November 1.
