= San Juan Bautista Jayacatlán =

- Municipality and town
- Location in Mexico
- Coordinates: 17°25′N 96°49′W
- Country: Mexico
- State: Oaxaca

Area
  - Total: 173.51 km^{2} (66.99 sq mi)

Population (2005)
  - Total: 1,254
- Time zone: UTC-6 (Central Standard Time)

San Juan Bautista Jayacatlán is a town and municipality in Oaxaca in south-western Mexico. The municipality covers an area of 173.51 km^{2}. It is part of the Etla District in the Valles Centrales region. As of 2005, the municipality had a total population of 1,254.
