= Benito Juárez National Park =

National park in Oaxaca, Mexico

- IUCN category II (national park)
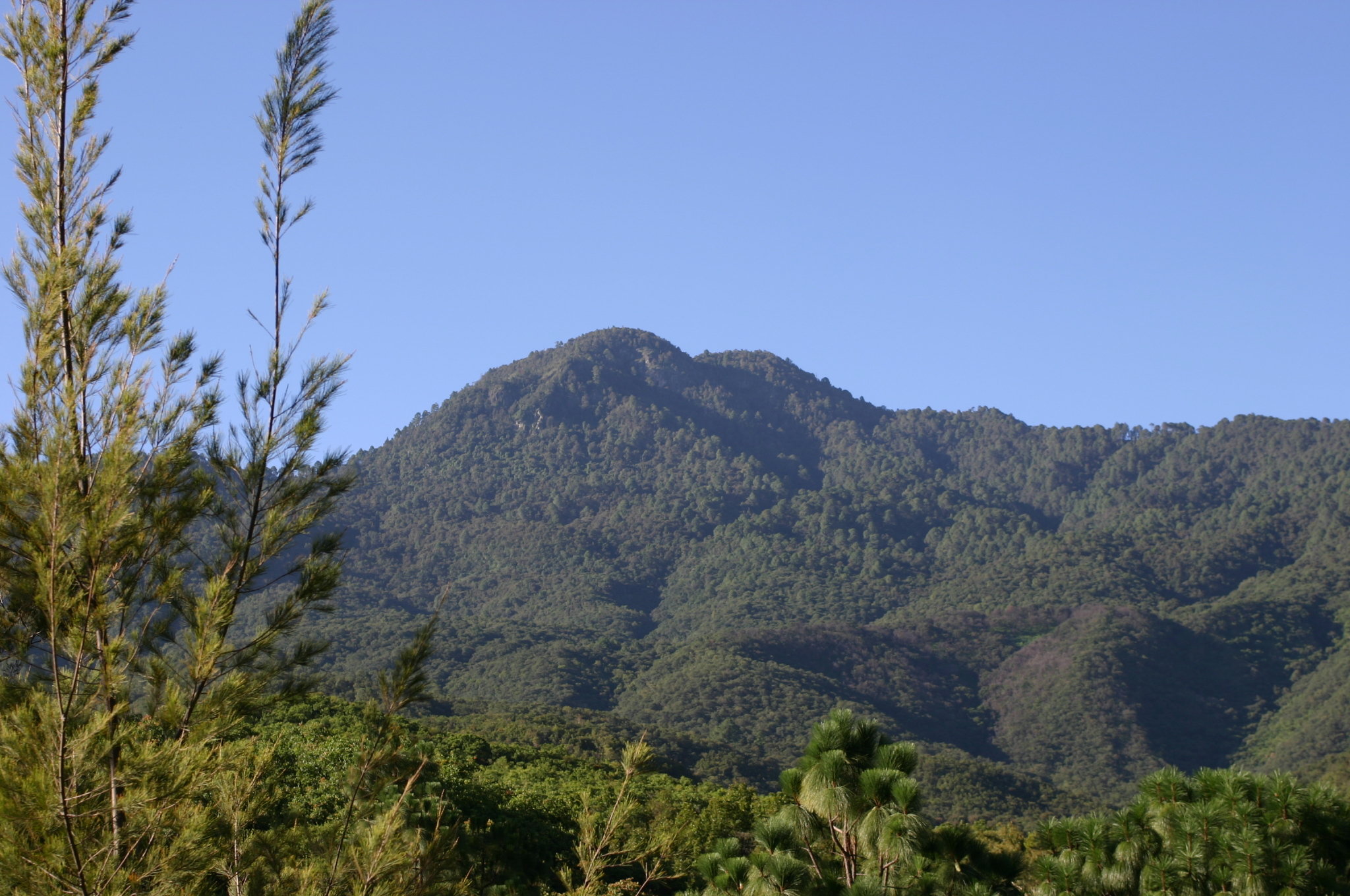
- Cerro de San Felipe

- Location within Mexico
- Interactive map of Benito Juárez National Park
- Location: Oaxaca, Mexico
- Coordinates: 17°10′05″N 96°44′20″W
- Area: 2,737 ha (6,760 acres)
- Established: 1937

The Benito Juárez National Park is in the Valles Centrales Region of Oaxaca, Mexico, and includes parts of the municipalities of San Felipe Tejalapam and San Andres Huayapan. The southern boundary of the park is about five kilometers north of the City of Oaxaca. The park was established in 1937 during the presidency of General Lazaro Cardenas del Rio, and is named after President Benito Juárez, who was a native of Oaxaca.

== Description ==
The park ranges from 1,650 to 3,050 meters above sea level. The climate is Coastal sub-humid and Temperate sub-humid. The main rivers that cross the park are the Huayapan and San Felipe rivers. Most of their water is piped to supply the city of Oaxaca. The park covers 2,737 hectares, including the 3,111 meter high Cerro San Felipe, part of the Sierra Madre de Oaxaca. There are pine and oak forests in the upper reaches of the mountain. Lower down there are scrub oaks, and tropical deciduous forest in the canyons.

== Concerns ==
The park is the main home of the dwarf jay (Cyanolyca nana), considered a vulnerable species. The boundaries of the park are not well delimited. The park is threatened by livestock encroachment, illegal logging, forest fires and hunting. The pine-oak forests are being attacked by mistletoe, especially in the area adjacent to San Andrés Huayapan. The sport of downhill cycling is popular within the park.

== Gallery of flora ==
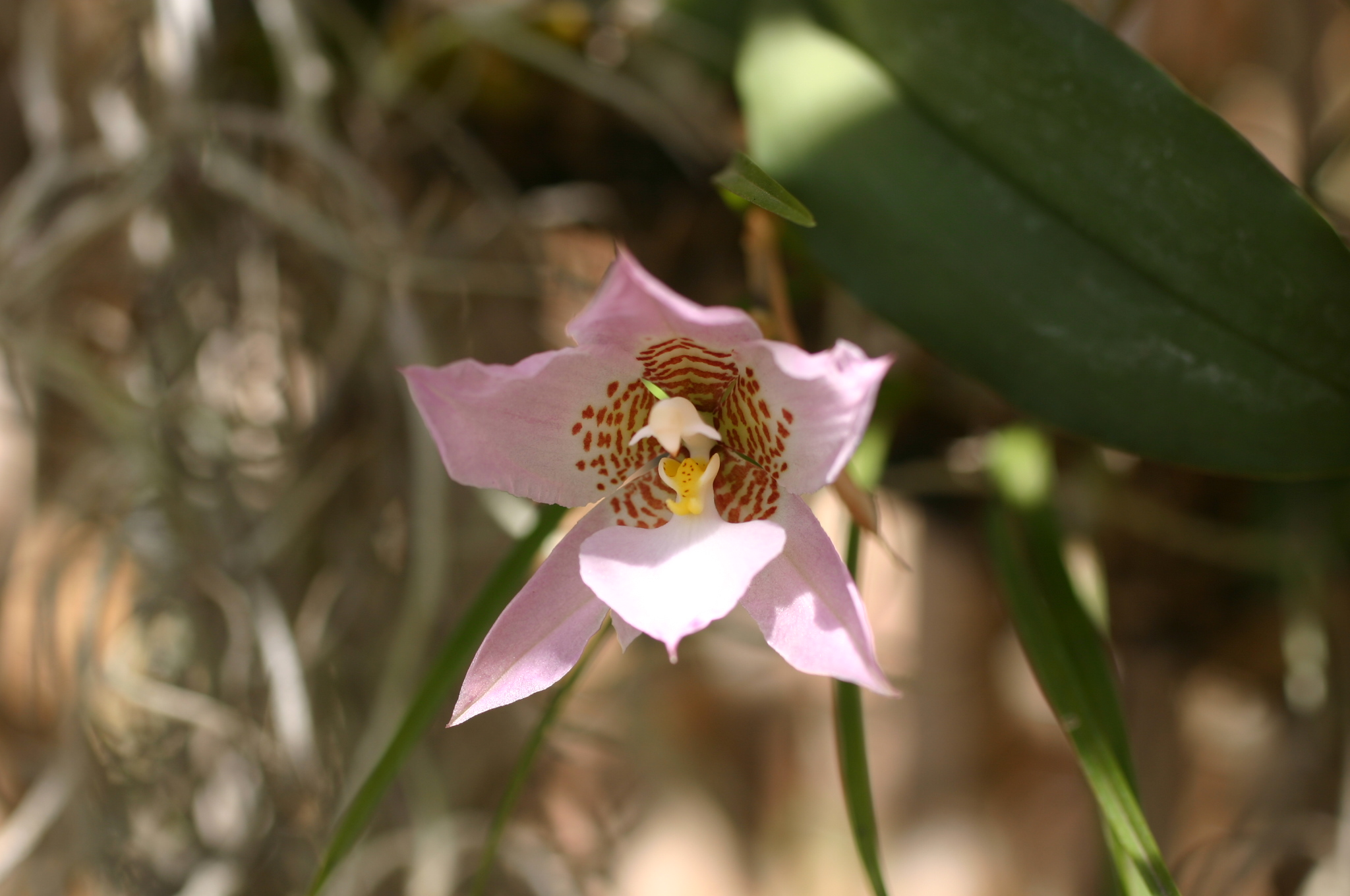
Rhynchostele cervantesii ssp. membranacea an endemic orchid in Oaxaca

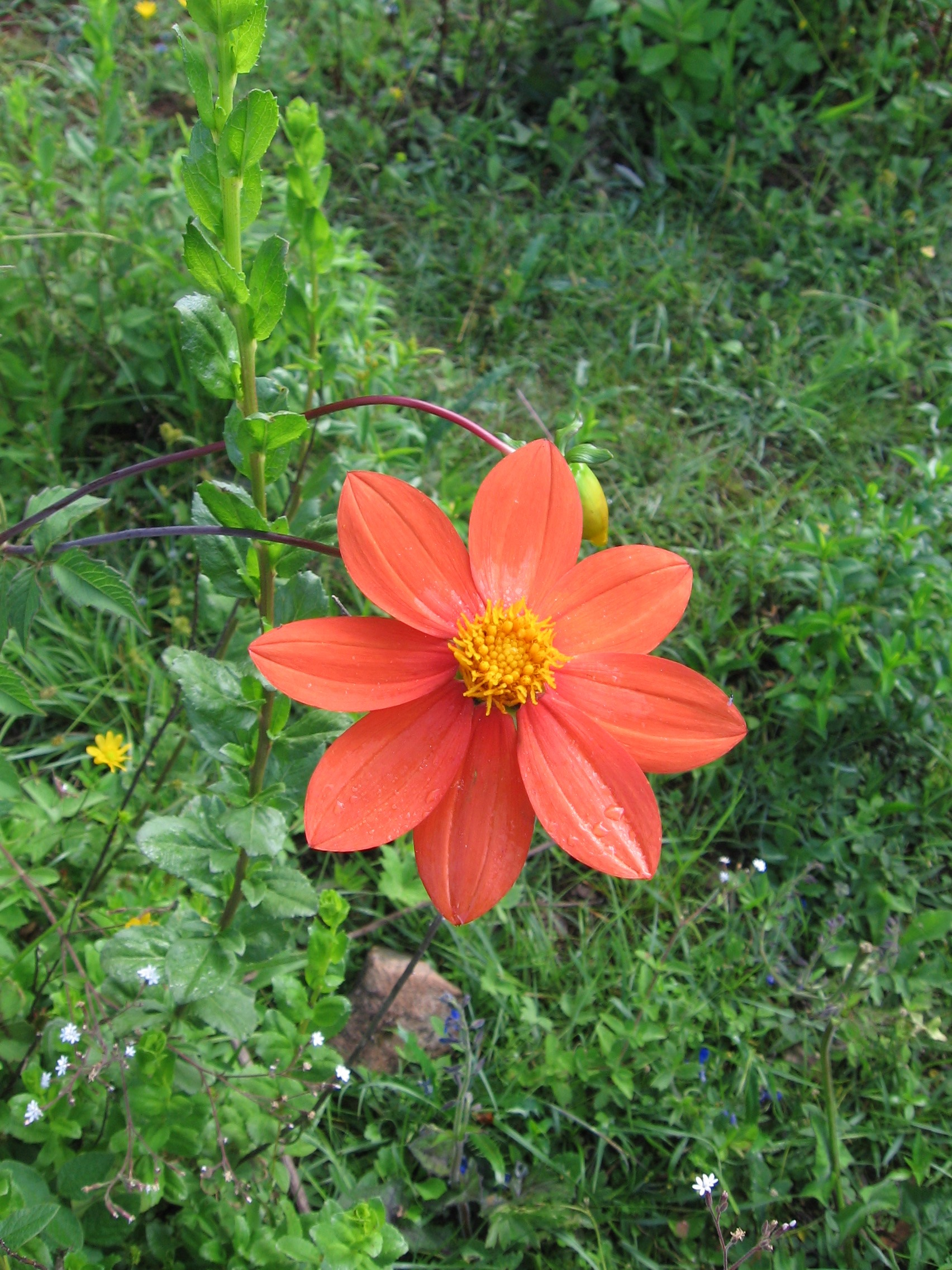
Dalia, national flower of Mexico

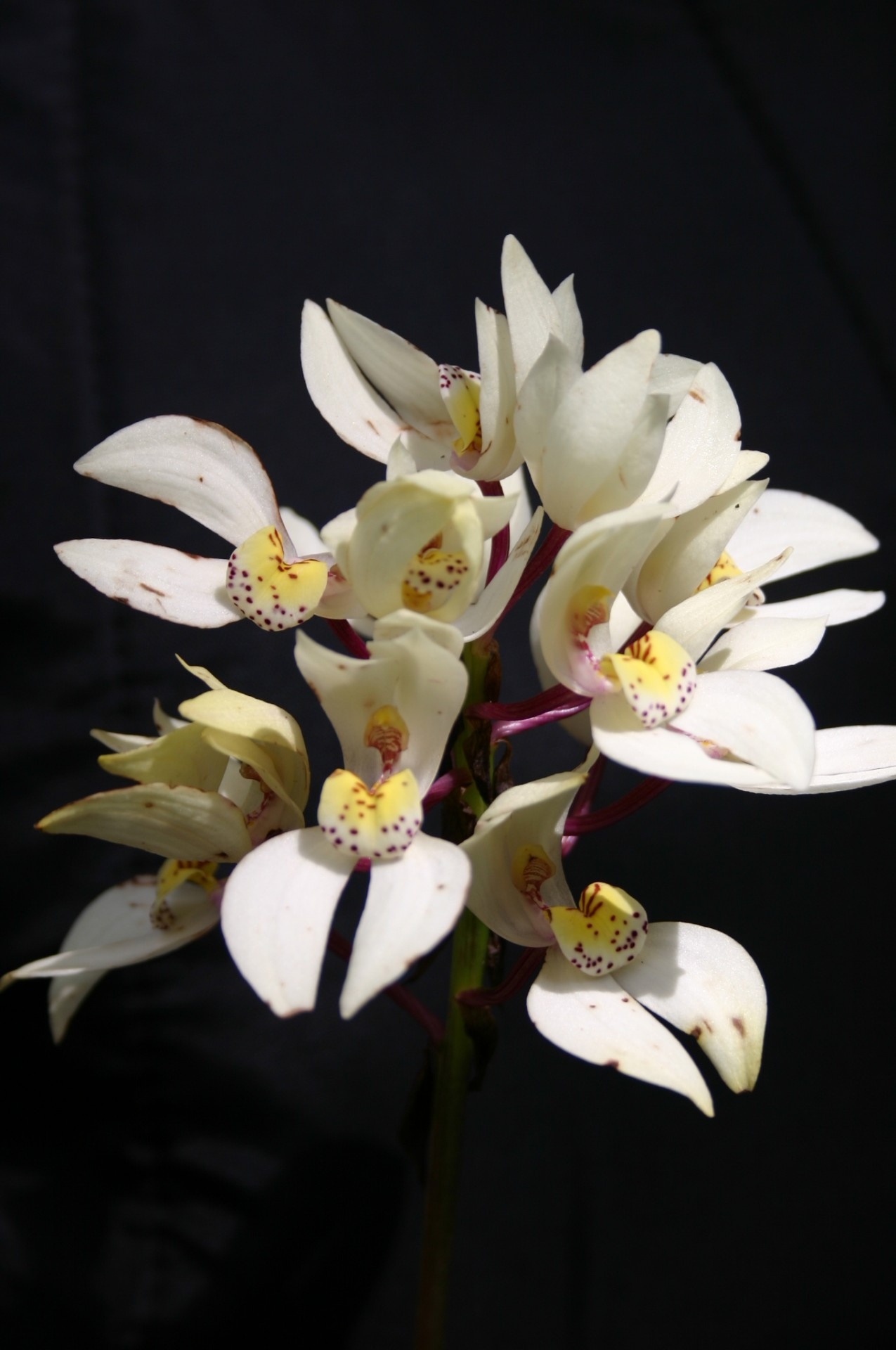
Orquídea de Tierra (Govenia lilacea)

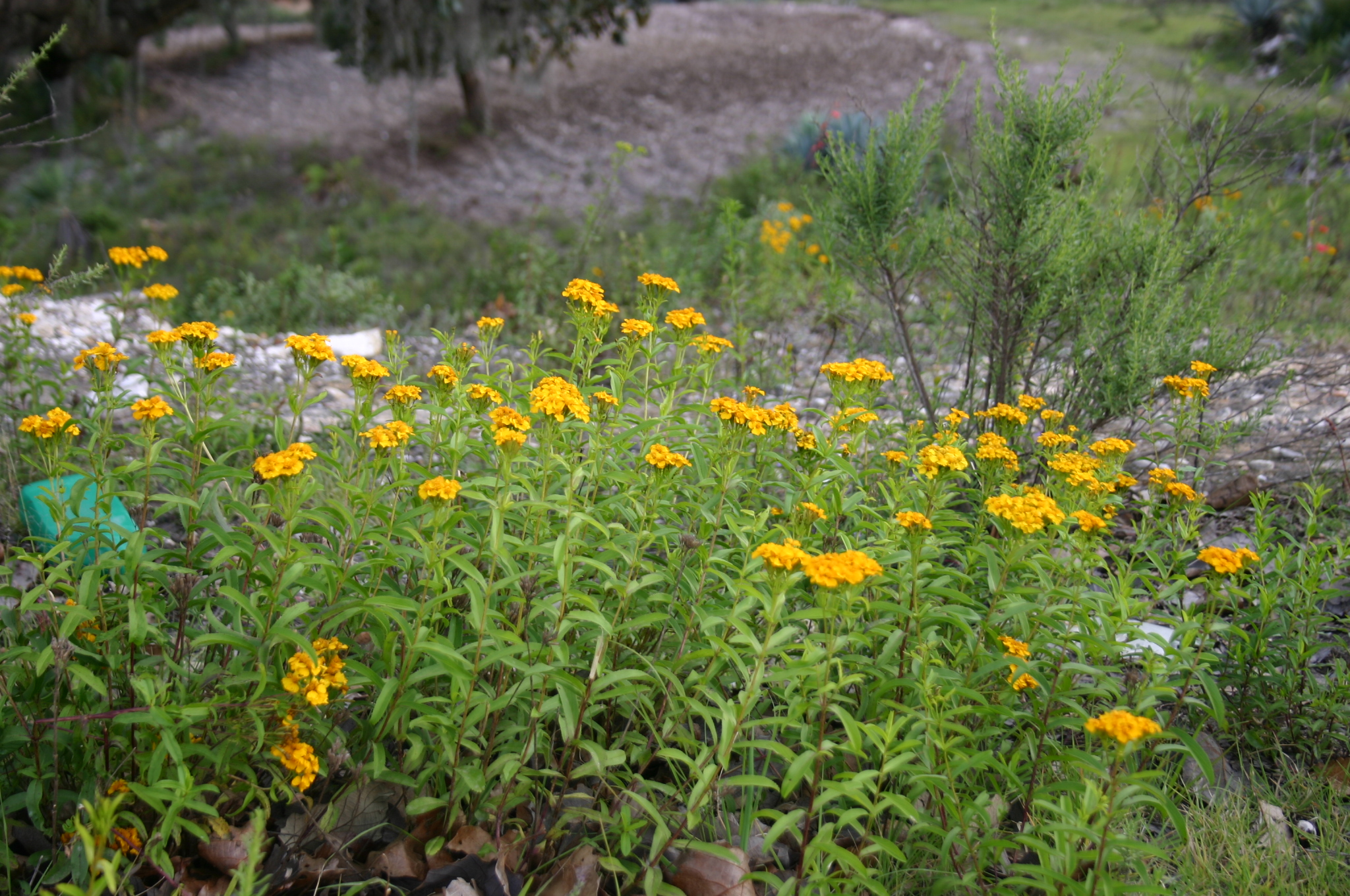
Pericón (Tagetes lucida)

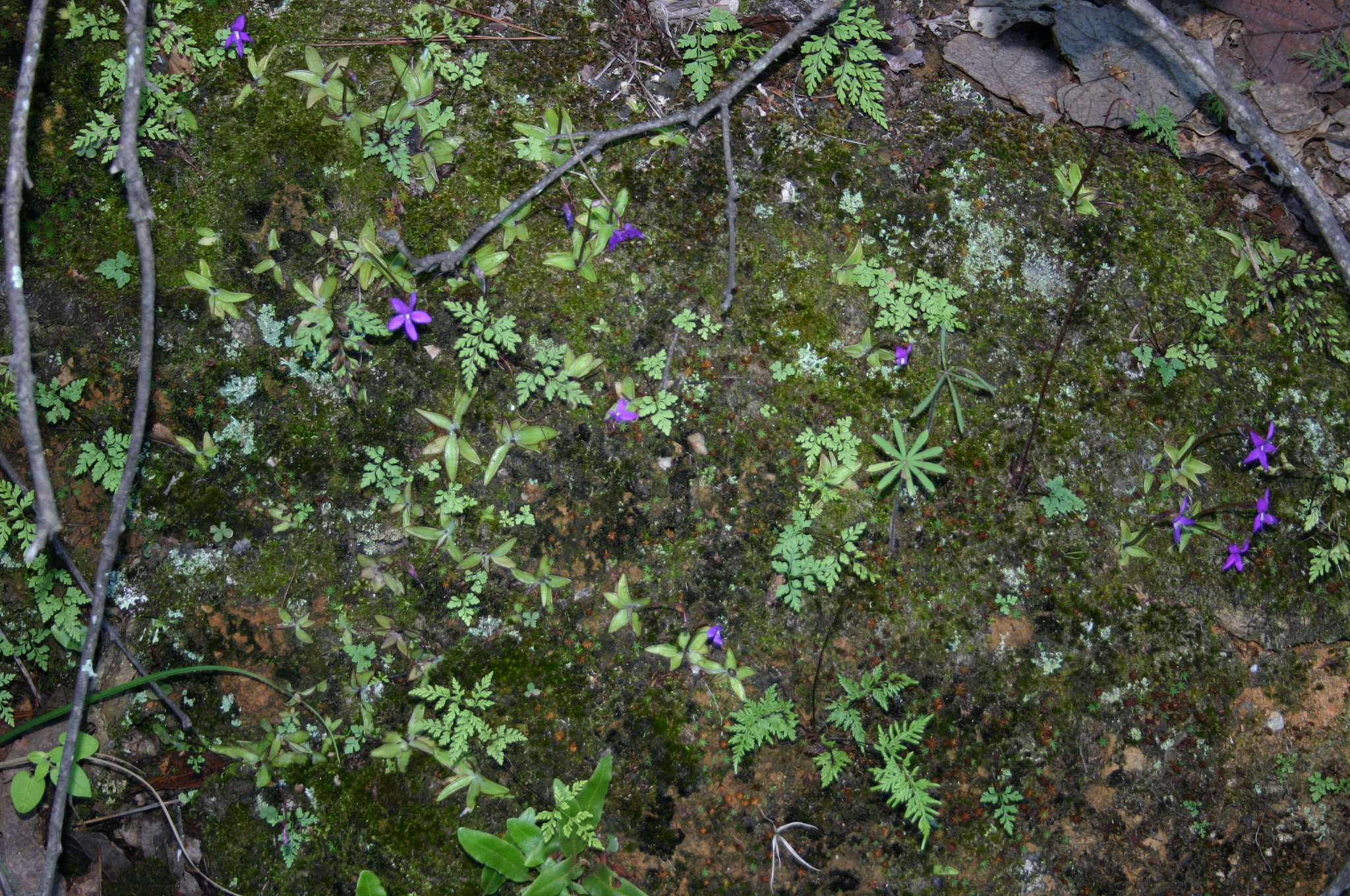
Pinguicula stolonifera, carnivorous plant

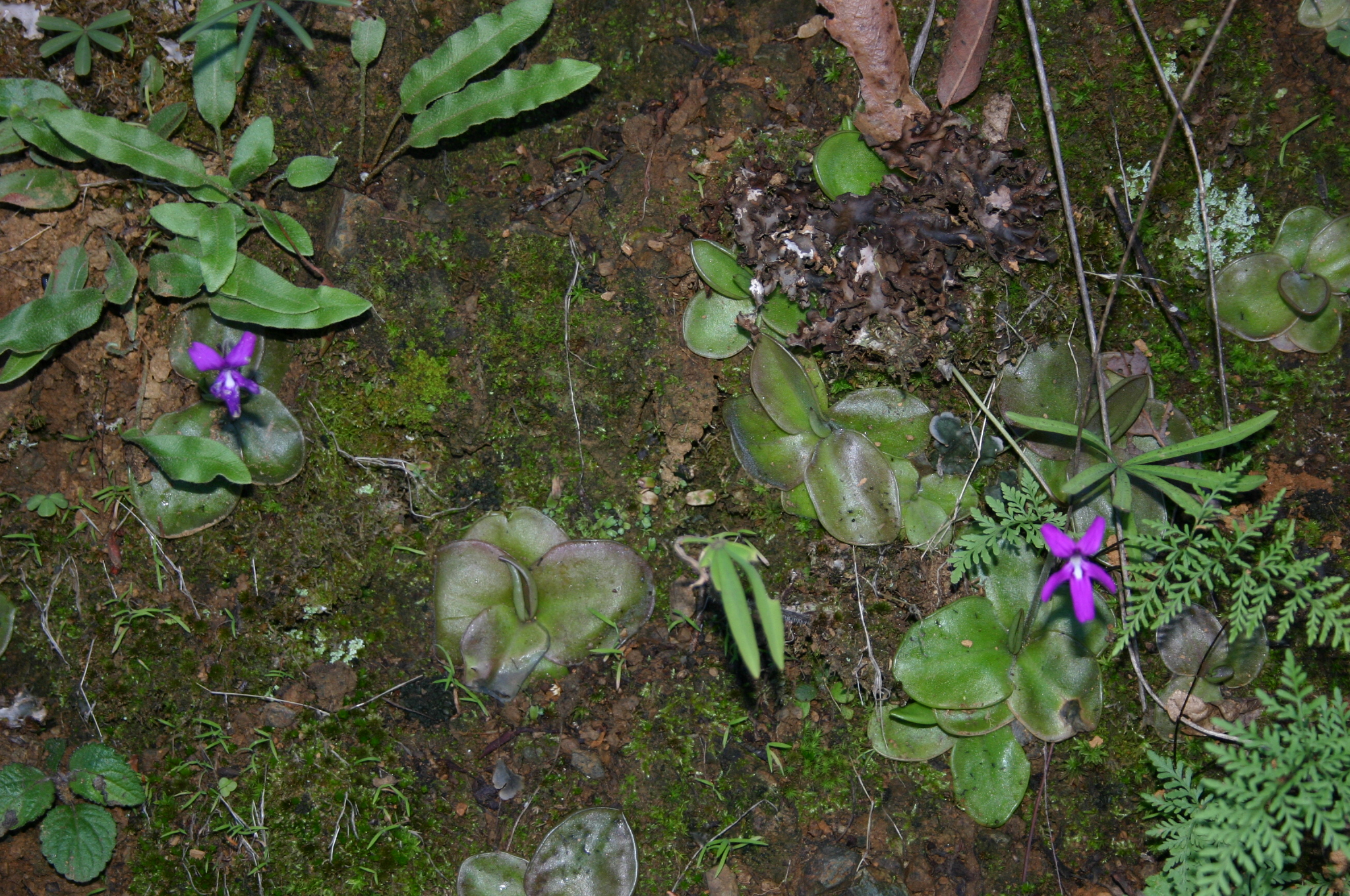
Another species of Pinguicula (Pinguicula moranensis)

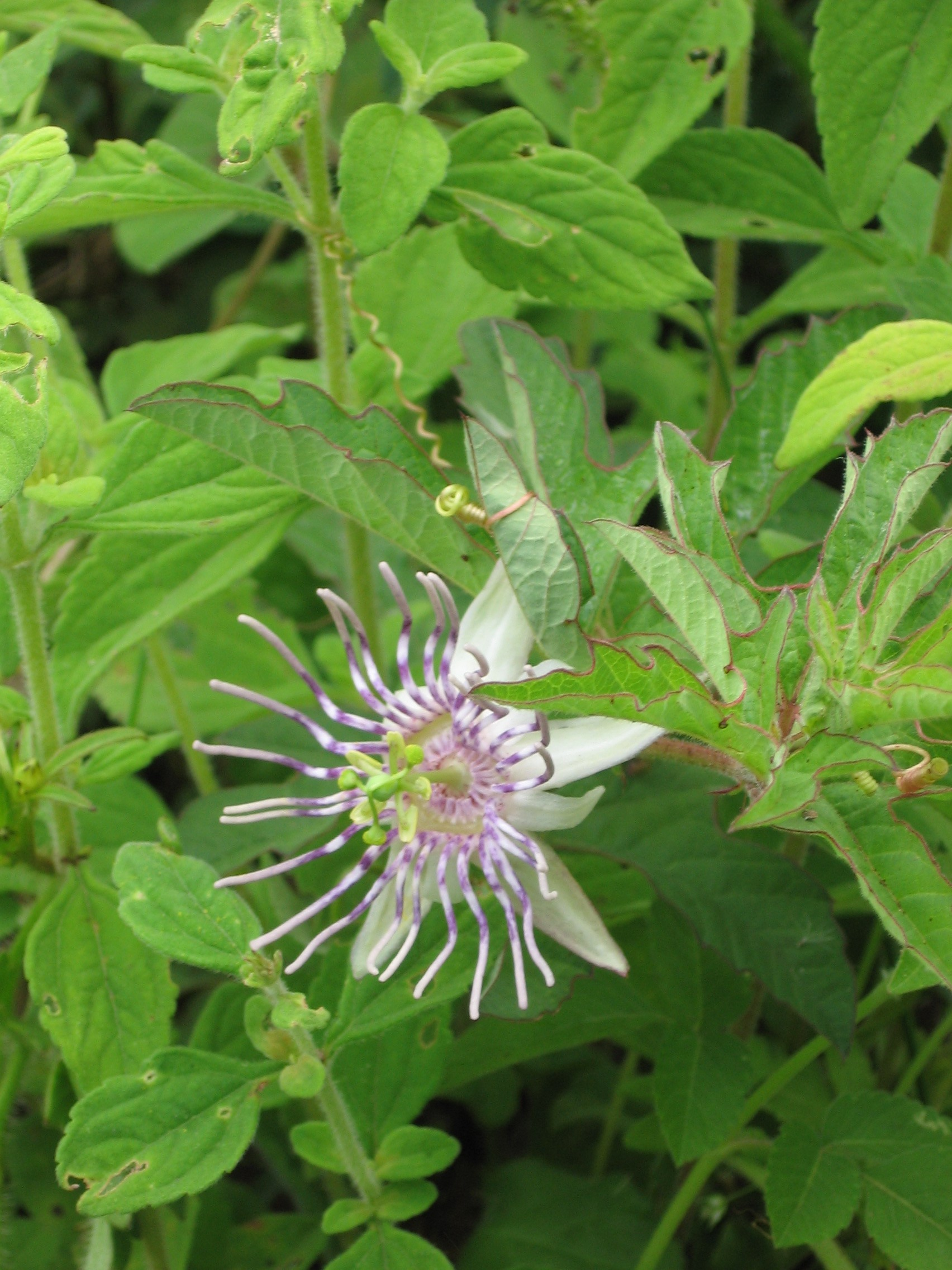
Passiflora (Passiflora holosericea)

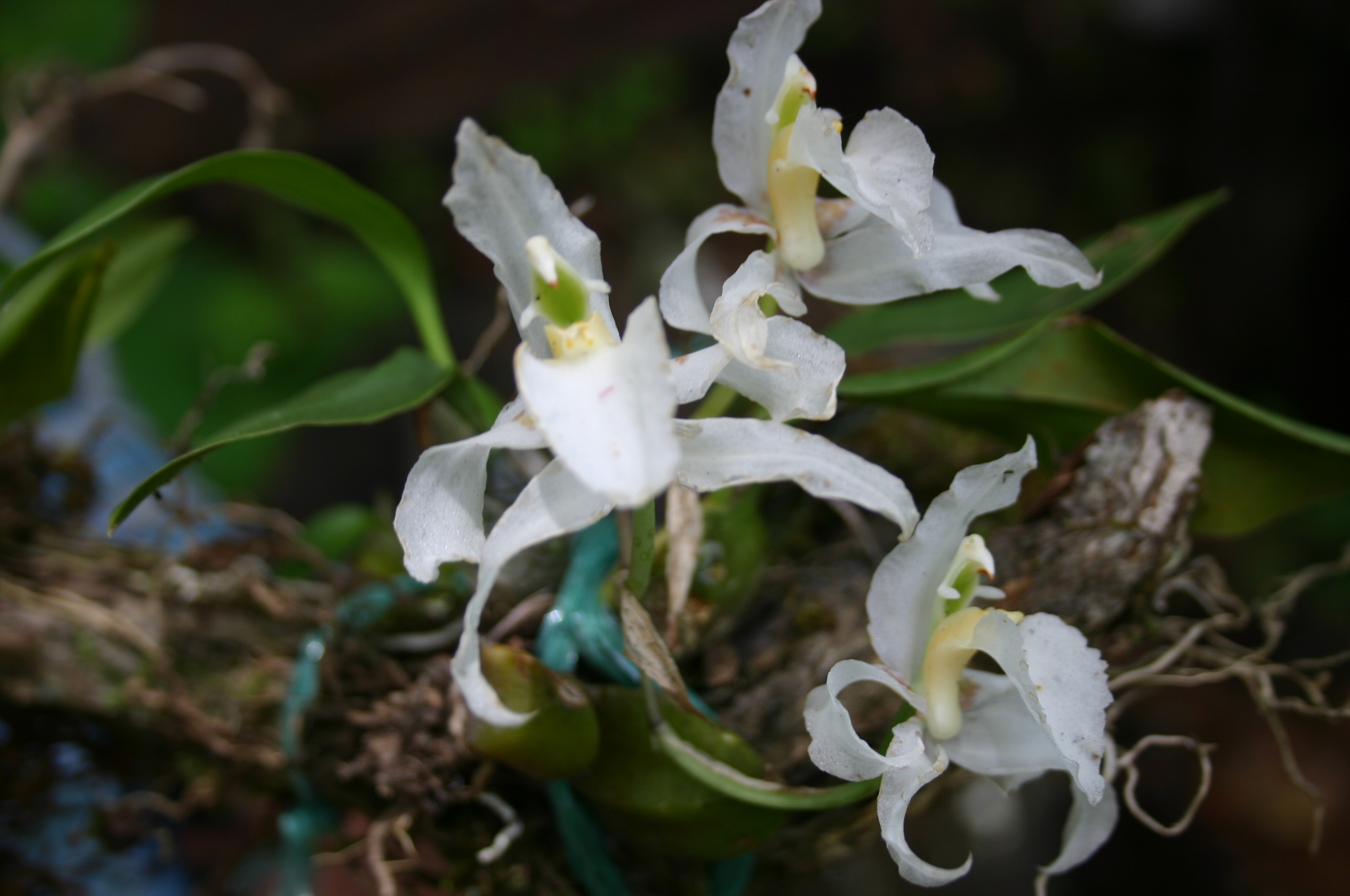
Rhynchostele galeottiana a species of orchid in danger of extinction
