= Atlatlauca =

Spanish corregimiento

Atlatlauca was a Spanish corregimiento during the colonial period of New Spain that existed from 1532 until 1743, in the later year it was merged into Antequera. It included what is today the municipality of San Juan Bautista Atatlahuca

Prior to the coming of the Spanish the area was between areas inhabited by Cuicatecans tributary to the Mexica under control of military forces based at Coaixtlahuacan and the Chinantecan state of Malinaltepec.

The first colonization attempt by Spaniards in 1520 failed, but the area was conquered in 1521. The area population suffered severe declines due to epidemics during the Spanish period.

== Sources ==
- Gerhard, Peter. Guide to the Historical Geography of New Spain. Cambridge: University Press, 1972. p. 54-55.
