= San Francisco Telixtlahuaca =

- Municipality and town
- Location in Mexico
- Coordinates: 17°18′N 96°54′W
- Country: Mexico
- State: Oaxaca

Area
  - Total: 79.1 km^{2} (30.5 sq mi)

Population (2005)
  - Total: 10,278
- Time zone: UTC-6

San Francisco Telixtlahuaca is a town and municipality in Oaxaca in south-western Mexico. The municipality covers an area of 79.1 km^{2}. It is part of the Etla District in the Valles Centrales region.

As of 2005, the municipality had a total population of 10,278.

== Climate ==
Climate data for San Francisco Telixtlahuaca (1991–2020 normals, extremes 1961–present)
Month	Jan	Feb	Mar	Apr	May	Jun	Jul	Aug	Sep	Oct	Nov	Dec	Year
Record high °C (°F)	39 (102)	37 (99)	39 (102)	39.5 (103.1)	39.5 (103.1)	39.5 (103.1)	35 (95)	38 (100)	35 (95)	33 (91)	35 (95)	36 (97)	39.5 (103.1)
Mean daily maximum °C (°F)	25.7 (78.3)	27.4 (81.3)	29.3 (84.7)	29.9 (85.8)	29.2 (84.6)	26.7 (80.1)	25.5 (77.9)	25.9 (78.6)	25.5 (77.9)	25.5 (77.9)	25.5 (77.9)	25.8 (78.4)	26.8 (80.2)
Daily mean °C (°F)	17.3 (63.1)	18.4 (65.1)	20.0 (68.0)	21.3 (70.3)	21.5 (70.7)	20.7 (69.3)	19.7 (67.5)	20.0 (68.0)	19.9 (67.8)	19.2 (66.6)	18.2 (64.8)	17.7 (63.9)	19.5 (67.1)
Mean daily minimum °C (°F)	8.9 (48.0)	9.3 (48.7)	10.6 (51.1)	12.7 (54.9)	13.7 (56.7)	14.7 (58.5)	13.9 (57.0)	14.0 (57.2)	14.2 (57.6)	12.9 (55.2)	10.9 (51.6)	9.5 (49.1)	12.1 (53.8)
Record low °C (°F)	−2 (28)	−2 (28)	2 (36)	4 (39)	6 (43)	9 (48)	7 (45)	8 (46)	7 (45)	5 (41)	1.2 (34.2)	0 (32)	−2 (28)
Average precipitation mm (inches)	1.4 (0.06)	4.1 (0.16)	14.5 (0.57)	45.7 (1.80)	85.7 (3.37)	159.9 (6.30)	108.7 (4.28)	132.9 (5.23)	143.9 (5.67)	59.4 (2.34)	8.4 (0.33)	4.9 (0.19)	769.5 (30.30)
Average precipitation days	0.3	0.6	1.6	4.2	7.0	12.9	11.3	12.1	12.1	5.5	1.1	0.4	69.1
Source: Servicio Meteorológico Nacional
