= San Juan Bautista Guelache =

- Municipality and town
- Location in Mexico
- Coordinates: 17°14′N 96°47′W
- Country: Mexico
- State: Oaxaca

Area
  - Total: 70.17 km^{2} (27.09 sq mi)

Population (2005)
  - Total: 4,912
- Time zone: UTC-6 (Central Standard Time)

San Juan Bautista Guelache is a town and municipality in Oaxaca in south-western Mexico. The municipality covers an area of 70.17 km^{2}. It is part of the Etla District in the Valles Centrales region. As of 2005, the municipality had a total population of 4,912.
