= San Andrés Zautla =

- Municipality and town
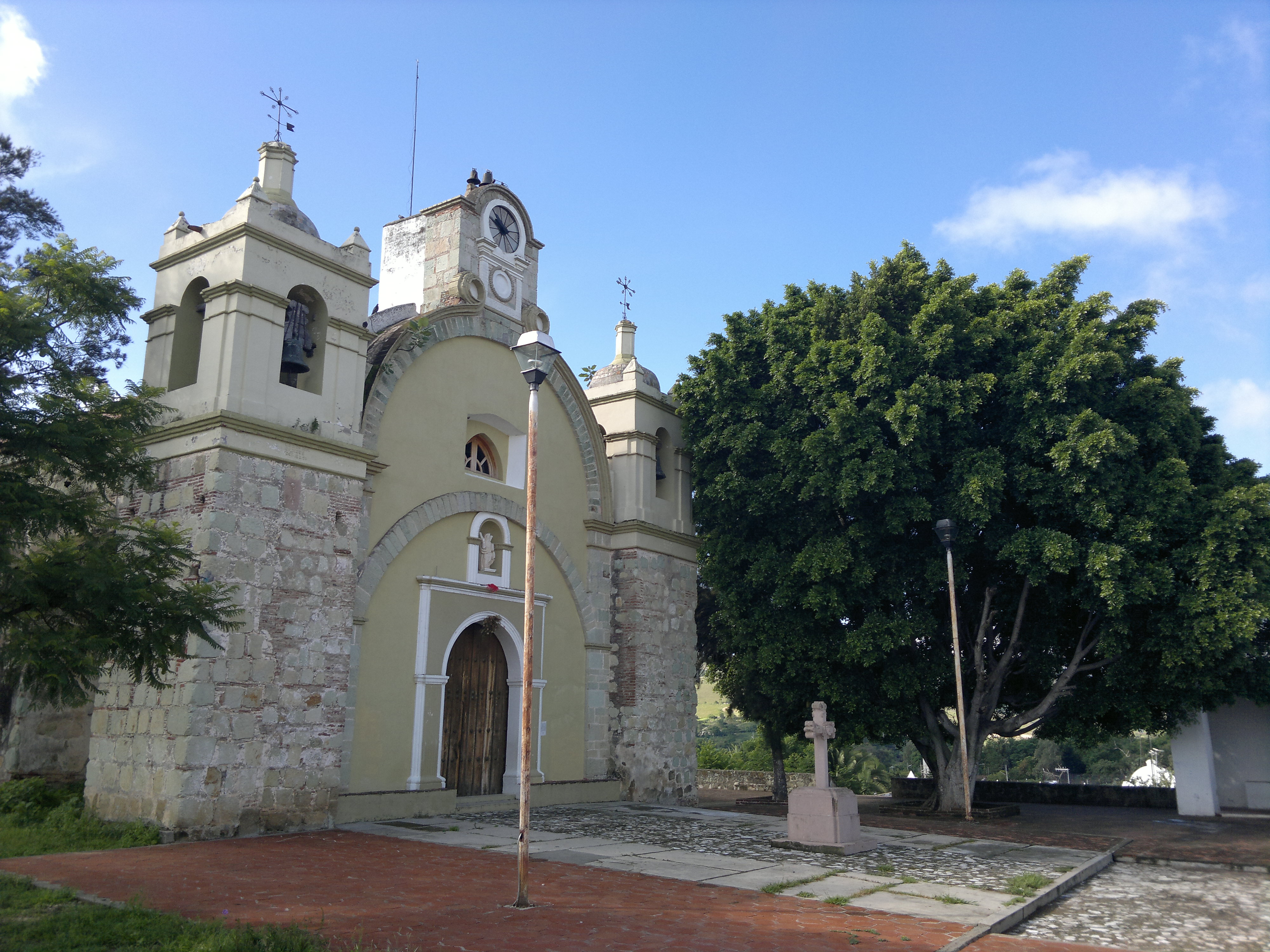
- 16th century Spanish colonial church in San Andrés Zautla.

- Location in Mexico
- Coordinates: 17°12′N 96°52′W
- Country: Mexico
- State: Oaxaca

Area
  - Total: 21.69 km^{2} (8.37 sq mi)

Population (2020)
  - Total: 5,326
- 52% male, 48% female
- Time zone: UTC-6 (Central Standard Time)

San Andrés Zautla is a town and municipality in Oaxaca in south-western Mexico. The municipality covers an area of 21.69 km^{2}. It is part of the Etla District in the Valles Centrales region. As of 2005, the municipality had a total population of 5,326, of whom 281 spoke an indigenous language. During the colonial period San Andrés Zautla was part of the jurisdiction of Huexolotitlan. A 16th century Spanish colonial church in town is a listed Cultural Landmark, and possesses a historic pipe organ, dated 1726, now restored and playable.
