= Soledad Etla =

- Municipality and town
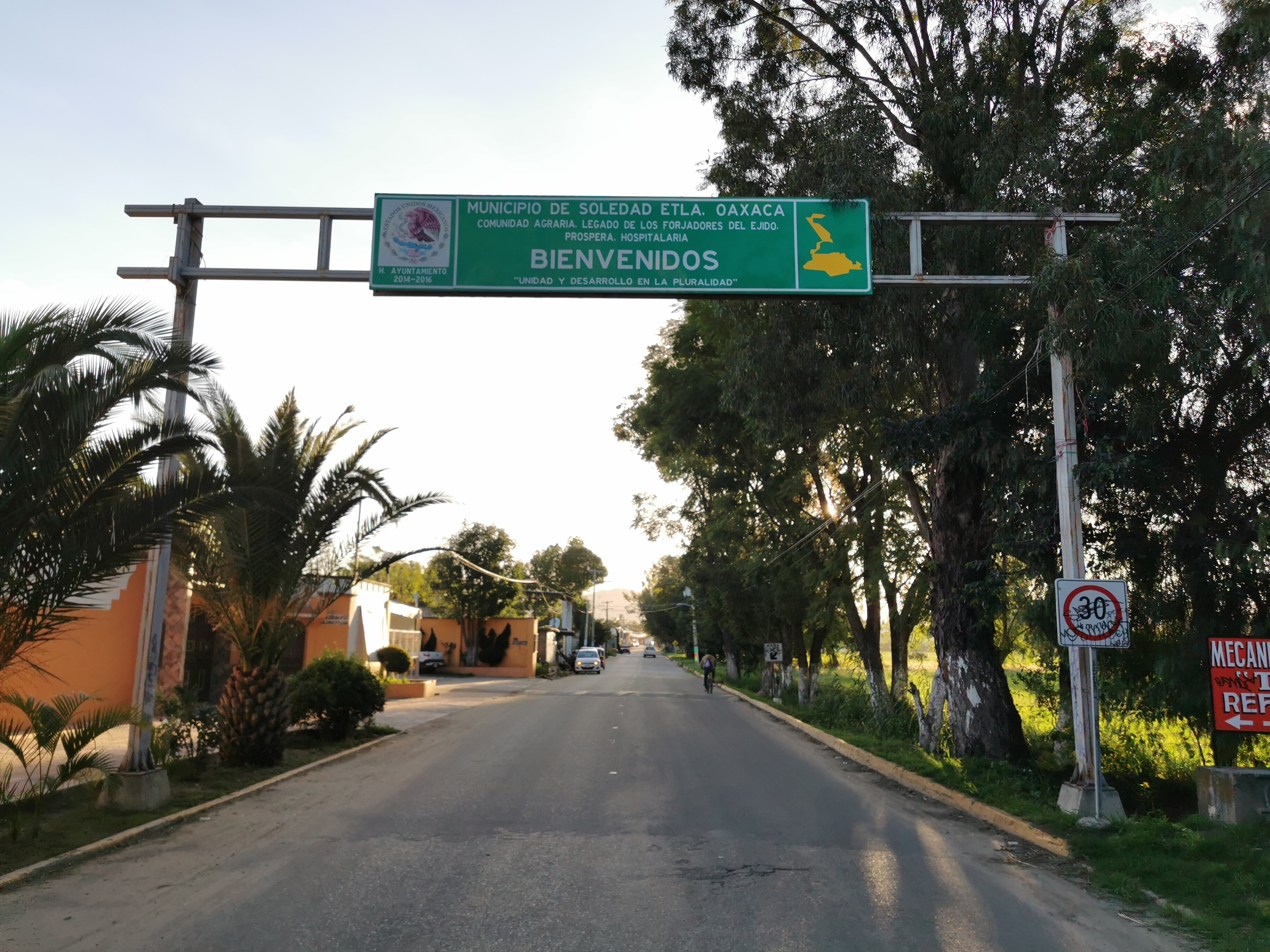

- Location in Mexico
- Coordinates: 17°10′N 96°49′W
- Country: Mexico
- State: Oaxaca
- Time zone: UTC-6 (Central Standard Time)

Soledad Etla is a town and municipality in Oaxaca in south-western Mexico. The municipality covers an area of km^{2}. It is part of the Etla District in the Valles Centrales region. As of 2005, the municipality had a total population of .
