= Santiago Tenango =

- Municipality and town
- Interactive map of Santiago Tenango
- Coordinates: 17°19′N 97°00′W
- Country: Mexico
- State: Oaxaca

Area
  - Total: 196.48 km^{2} (75.86 sq mi)
- Elevation: 2,040 m (6,690 ft)

Population (2005)
  - Total: 1,782
- Time zone: UTC-6 (Central Standard Time)

Santiago Tenango is a town and municipality in Oaxaca in south-western Mexico. The municipality covers an area of 196.48 km^{2}, and is part of the Etla District in the Valles Centrales region.

== Population ==
As of 2005, the municipality had a total population of 1,782.
