= San Felipe Tejalapam =

- Municipality and town
- Location in Mexico
- Coordinates: 17°07′N 96°51′W
- Country: Mexico
- State: Oaxaca

Area
  - Total: 76.55 km^{2} (29.56 sq mi)

Population (2005)
  - Total: 6,221
- Time zone: UTC-6 (Central Standard Time)

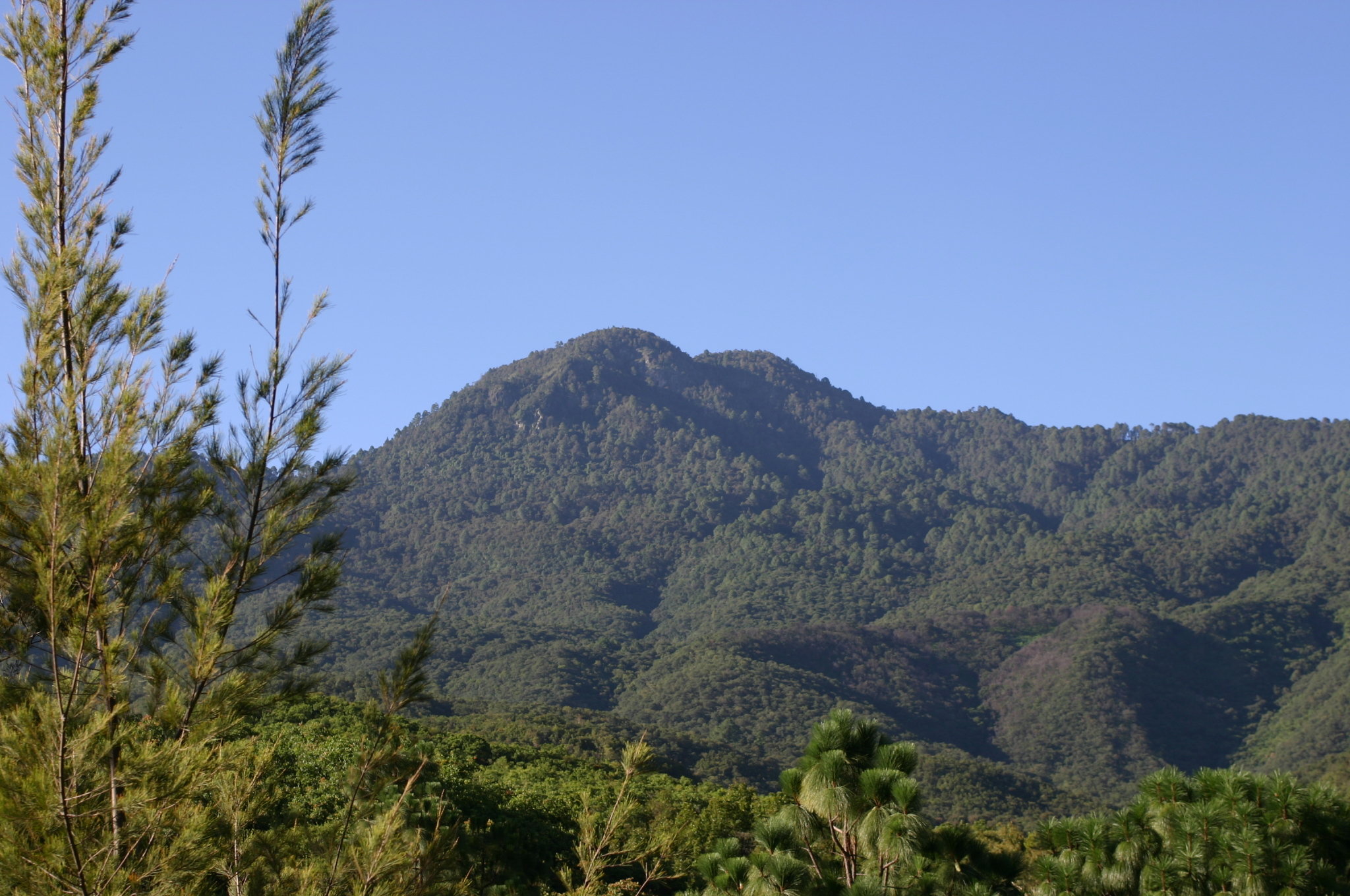
Cerro de San Felipe

San Felipe Tejalapam is a town and municipality in Oaxaca in south-western Mexico. The municipality covers an area of 76.55 km^{2}. It is part of the Etla District in the Valles Centrales region.

As of 2005, the municipality had a total population of 6,221. The municipality includes part of the Benito Juárez National Park.
