= Nazareno Etla =

- Municipality and town
- Location in Mexico
- Coordinates: 17°11′N 96°49′W
- Country: Mexico
- State: Oaxaca

Area
  - Total: 16.59 km^{2} (6.41 sq mi)

Population (2005)
  - Total: 3,720
- Time zone: UTC-6 (Central Standard Time)

Nazareno Etla is a town and municipality in Oaxaca in south-western Mexico. The municipality covers an area of 16.59 km^{2}. It is part of the Etla District in the Valles Centrales region.

As of 2005, the municipality had a total population of 3,720.
