= San Juan Bautista Atatlahuca =

- Municipality and town
- Location in Mexico
- Coordinates: 17°32′N 96°50′W
- Country: Mexico
- State: Oaxaca

Area
  - Total: 196.48 km^{2} (75.86 sq mi)

Population (2005)
  - Total: 1,384
- Time zone: UTC-6 (Central Standard Time)

San Juan Bautista Atatlahuca is a town and municipality in Oaxaca in south-western Mexico. The municipality covers an area of 196.48 km^{2}. It is part of the Etla District in the Valles Centrales region. As of 2005, the municipality had a total population of 1,384.

== History ==
Also spelled Atlatlahuca in the early 16th century it was the domain of the Cuicatecans who were tributary subjects of the Mexica. It was then the center of the Spanish corrigimento of Atlatlauca from 1532 until 1743 when it was merged into the alcaldia mayor of Antequera.
