= San Pablo Etla =

- Municipality and town
- Location in Mexico
- Coordinates: 17°09′N 96°45′W
- Country: Mexico
- State: Oaxaca

Area
  - Total: 33.17 km^{2} (12.81 sq mi)
- Elevation: 1,630 m (5,350 ft)

Population (2020)
  - Total: 17,116
- Time zone: UTC-6 (Central Standard Time)

San Pablo Etla is a town and municipality in Oaxaca in south-western Mexico. The municipality covers an area of 33.17 km^{2}. It is part of the Etla District in the Valles Centrales region. As of 2020, the municipality had a total population of 17,116.
