= Reyes Etla =

- Municipality and town
- Location in Mexico
- Coordinates: 17°12′N 96°49′W
- Country: Mexico
- State: Oaxaca

Area
  - Total: 24.24 km^{2} (9.36 sq mi)

Population (2005)
  - Total: 3,252
- Time zone: UTC-6 (Central Standard Time)
- Postal code: 68237
- Area code: 951

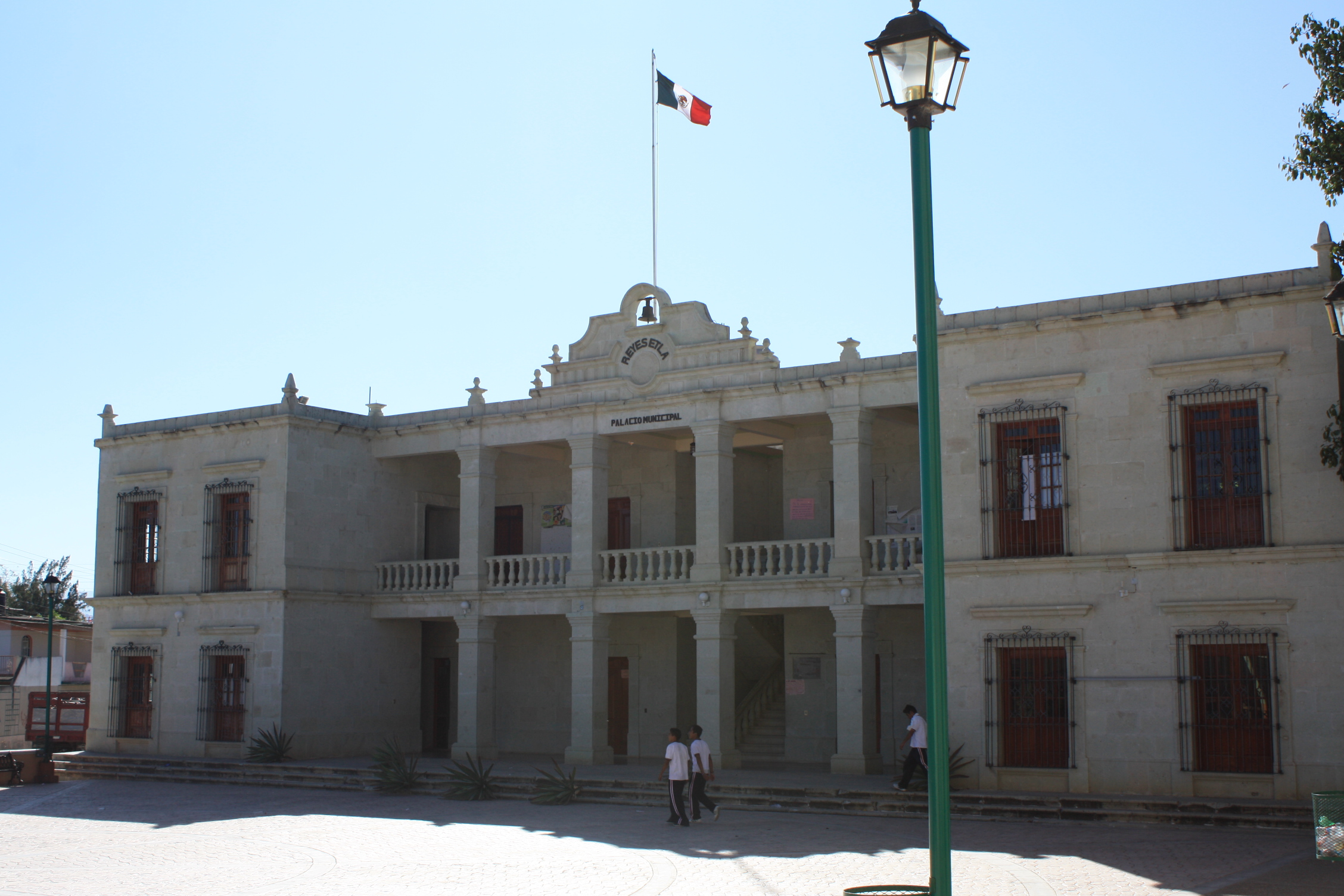
Municipal Palace of Reyes Etla,

Reyes Etla is a town and municipality in Oaxaca in south-western Mexico. The municipality covers an area of 24.24 km^{2}. It is part of the Etla District in the Valles Centrales region.

As of 2005, the municipality had a total population of 3,252.

Municipal President Victorino Javier Santiago Ruiz died in 2020 during the COVID-19 pandemic in Mexico.
