= Green glazed pottery of Atzompa =

Type of pottery from Oaxaca, Mexico

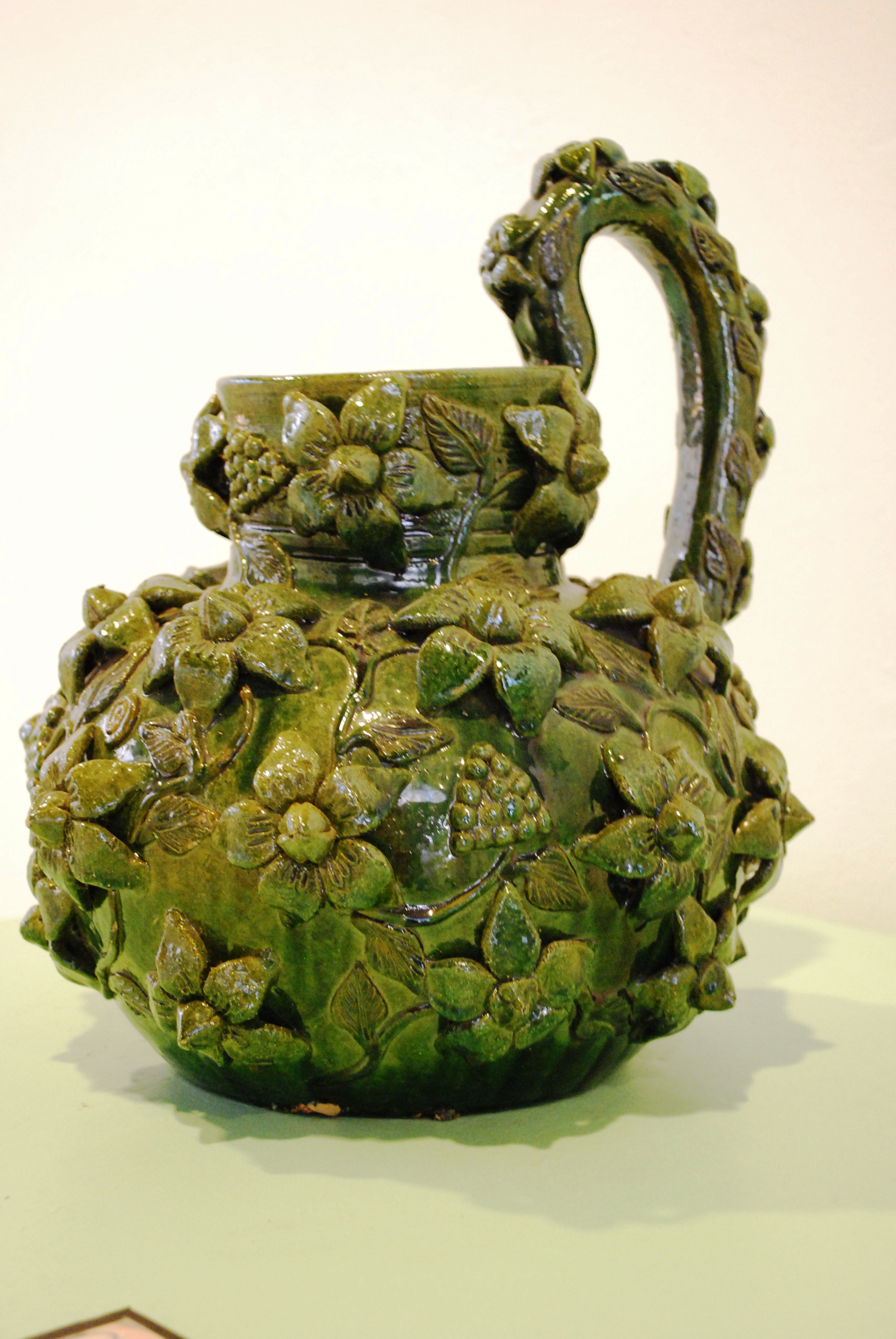
Sample of Atzompa's green glazed pottery at the Museo Estatal de Artes Populares de Oaxaca

Green glazed pottery of Atzompa is a style of glazed pottery, which originates in the Oaxaca, Mexico town of Santa María Atzompa. Almost all of the pottery made here is of a jade-green color, due to the lead monoxide glaze which has been traditionally applied to it.

== Introduction ==
Atzompa’s pottery history extends to the 7th to 9th century, when the town was established as a satellite to the large Monte Albán Zapotec city. Pottery from this period is of the barro negro type found in other communities of the area, but artifacts from this era show more diverse shapes, including jaguar heads. The glazing process was introduced by the Spanish in the 16th century, and the techniques from that time have changed little since.

By the mid 20th century, the green glazed pottery of the town was shipped to all parts of Mexico and exported to the United States, but concerns about lead in Mexican pottery deflated the market.

There have been some innovations from the 1990s to help bring back the market for the green pottery, including the introduction of lead-free glazes, a communal pottery market in Atzompa and the recognition of the innovations of a potter named Dolores Porras, who has introduced other colors and promoted the use of non-lead glazes.

== History ==
The town of Santa María Atzompa has been making pottery since the Monte Alban period of Oaxaca’s history, when the town was established as a satellite community between the 7th and 9th centuries. Objects found at the town’s archeological site show that the local pottery was of the barro negro type found in other communities in the region. However, the ancient pottery found here shows a wider variety of shapes, including jaguar heads, and eagle claws. After the Spanish conquest, lead glazing techniques were introduced here by cleric Alonso Figueroa and have been practiced here with little change since that time, with green becoming the preferred color.

By the mid 20th century, Atzompa had become the main producer of ceramics for the Oaxaca valley region, with its products shipped to all parts of Mexico and exported to the United States. However, concerns about the lead content in the glaze pummeled the Mexican pottery market. Today, most of the community’s distinctive green-glazed pottery is sold in neighboring Oaxaca city, with most families here making a subsistence living through that and by growing corn.

Recently, several innovations have been devised to try to help revive the pottery market. In the 1990s, the Mexican government developed lead-free glazes to be mass marketed. In the 2000s, a cooperative pottery market was created in the town, and the efforts of potter Dolores Porra, who created new designs and colors, has been recognized.

== The making of the pottery ==
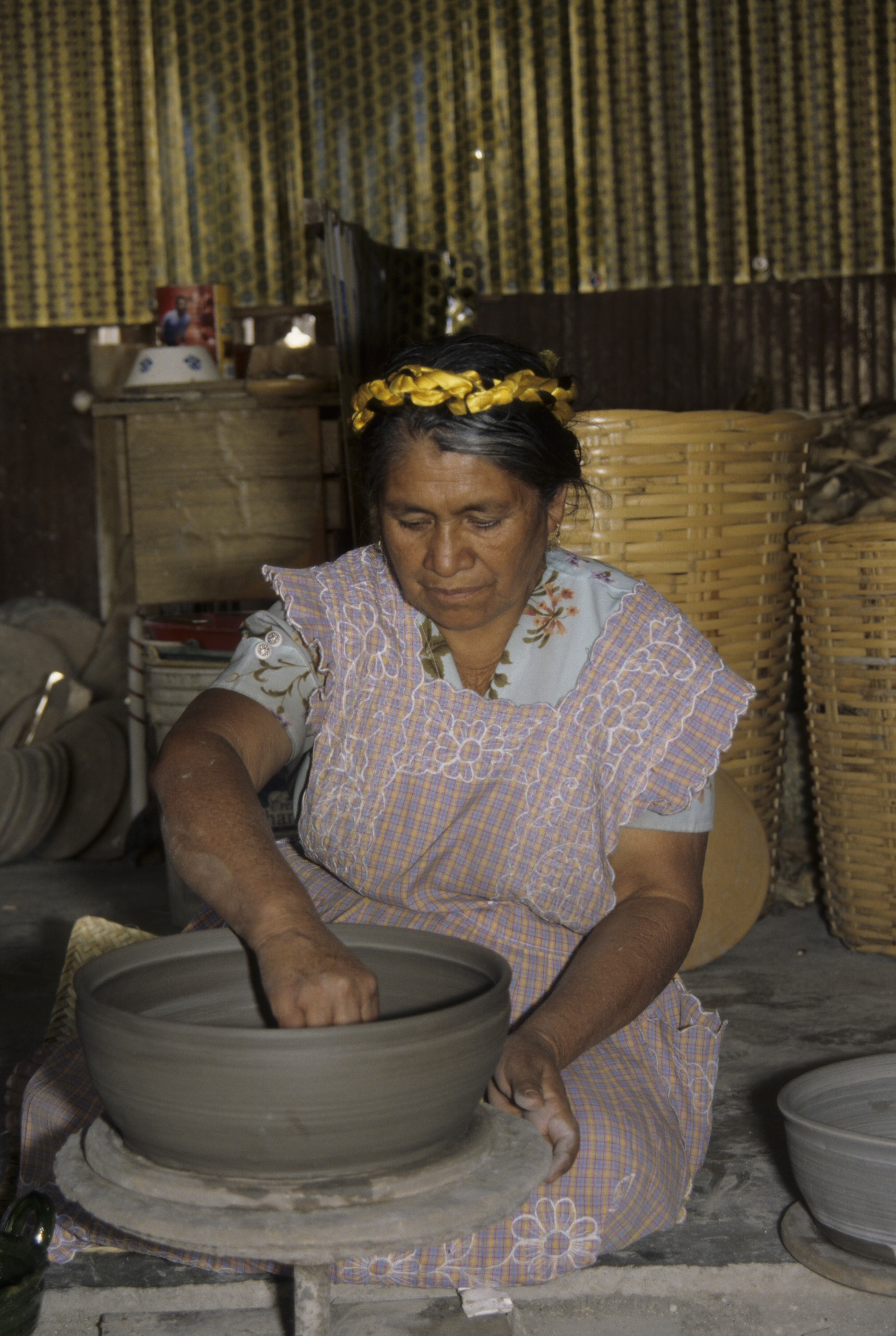
Tomasa, wife of Martin Mario Enriquez Lopez, working with a local version of the potter's wheel

About 90% of the people in the town proper are dedicated to making pottery, making it the basis of the town’s economy. Most of this pottery is created for kitchen use such as for cooking, baking and serving. The clay is mined from an area called San Lorenzo Cacautepec, four km from the town center. It is still carried by donkey along paths that were used by the town’s grandfathers. After the clay arrives at the workshop, the men break and work to make the clay uniform, mixing it and adding water. All members of the family, including the children work on tasks related to potting. The potter’s wheels are operated by foot, and date back to the pre-Hispanic era. After a piece is molded, it is set aside for eight days before firing. The color and shine is due to the glazing process, which was introduced in the 16th century and has remained mostly unchanged since then. The first firing is without the glaze, with the pieces emerging in their natural color and can be used in this form. However, very few pieces of this type will sell, and they sell at a low price. While the glaze is not inexpensive, it has become necessary to make the pottery acceptable to the market. The second firing to harden and adhere the glaze. The green color and shine of the pottery is a result of a lead monoxide glaze, which can leach into the foods that the pottery holds. The local people here have been warned of the dangers of the continuous use of the lead pottery but the warnings are mostly unheeded. Studies have shown that people in potters’ communities such as Atompa, where lead glaze is used have unusually high levels of the substance in their blood. The exposure comes not only from the making of the pottery, but the use of it to simmer sauces and stews. With time and repeated use, the lead leaches from the glaze into the food. In the 1990s, the Mexican government devised a glaze for pottery which is lead free as a response to lead poisoning problems in the country. A 1995 study showed that 44% of children under five years of age in working-class families had high levels of lead in their bloodstreams. Much of the push towards lead-free pottery has been due to economics rather than health when the U.S. restricted imports of Mexican pottery due to lead concerns.

== Communal pottery market of Atzompa ==
The center of Santa Maria Atzompa has a rustic church, a main plaza, one school and a half-completed municipal palace. The houses here are humble constructions of adobe and boards and the sidewalks are not paved. All around town, one can see black smoke rising from the pottery kilns firing jars, pots, comals, plates and other dishes. Most of these are sold in the markets of Oaxaca city, but it is also widely available in the streets of the town in makeshift stalls. The newest addition is a communal crafts market. The market is a new innovation to allow artisans to sell their pottery in one place, with craftsmen working in the market on rotating shifts, and with pottery marked by origin. This arrangement allows artisans to spend less time selling, and more time making pottery. At the end of each day, the accounts are tallied and each artisan takes home his/her earnings. This market has also had success attracting more national and international tourists to the town, which is helping the economy.

== Dolores Porras ==
While almost all of Atzompa’s pottery is of the traditional green-glazed variety, since the 1980s, a potter by the name of Dolores Porras has created the first glazed natural color and multicolored glazed pottery.

Dolores Porras was born in 1937 in Santa Maria Atzompa into a pottery making family. She grew up poor and could not go to school, beginning to make pottery when she was 13 years old. When she was 17, she began to work on her own, but economic necessity forced her to work for a number of other workshops, including that of Teodora Blanco Núñez, considered to be the “first Oaxacan potter” and creator of a jar called “mona” or “muñeca.” She was often hired to make vary large jars, which are difficult to create. Porras developed a white translucent glaze on which to paint colors such as bright oranges, blues, greens and yellows. Each of her pieces is done by hand and are decorated with figures such as borders, mermaids, flowers and iguanas. She has been invited to give workshops in the United States, where she learned about lead-free glazes and has applied these to her work. She was not able to work for the last years of her life due to Parkinson's disease and diminished sight. She remained poor and dependent on her family for support. She died on All Saints Day, November 1, 2011.

In 2010, a ceremony to honor her innovative work was organized by the Arden Rothstein of the Friends of Oaxacan Folk Art Association. The homage took place at the Casa de Cultura Oaxaqueña, which Porra surrounded by examples of her work The audience consisted of foreigners, fellow potters, the municipal president of Atzompa and the director of the cultural center. She was toasted with mezcal, whose strong aroma dominated the room. She received a plaque for her work as well as flowers, while a local band played.
