= San Lorenzo Cacaotepec =

- Municipality and town
- Location in Mexico
- Coordinates: 17°08′N 96°48′W
- Country: Mexico
- State: Oaxaca

Area
  - Total: 12.76 km^{2} (4.93 sq mi)

Population (2005)
  - Total: 11,559
- Time zone: UTC-6 (Central Standard Time)

San Lorenzo Cacaotepec is a town and municipality in Oaxaca in south-western Mexico. The municipality covers an area of 12.76 km^{2}. It is part of the Etla District in the Valles Centrales region. As of 2005, the municipality had a total population of 11,559.
