= San Pablo Huitzo =

- Municipality and town
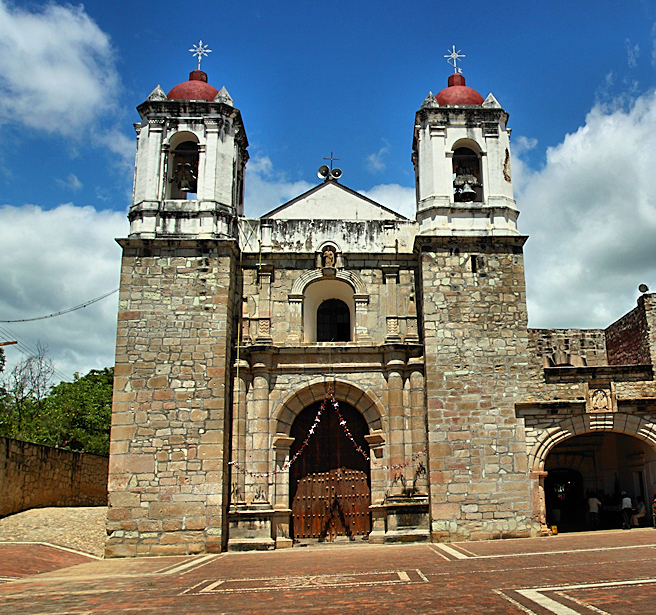
- The church of San Pablo in San Pablo Huitzo

- Location in Mexico
- Coordinates: 17°16′35″N 96°52′57″W
- Country: Mexico
- State: Oaxaca
- Settled: 1522

Area
  - Urban: 63.8 km^{2} (24.6 sq mi)
- Elevation: 1,700 m (5,600 ft)

Population (2005)
  - Municipality and town: 5,242
- Time zone: UTC-6 (Central Standard Time)
- Postal code: 68220
- Area code: 951

San Pablo Huitzo (commonly referred to as Huitzo) is a town and municipality in Oaxaca in south-western Mexico. The municipality covers an area of 63.80 km^{2}. It is part of the Etla District in the Valles Centrales region. As of 2005, the municipality had a total population of 5,242.

== History ==
The area comprising Huitzo was inhabited as early as 1200 BCE. By 1400 AD a Zapotec village existed that was known by the name of Huijazoo, a word that means Warrior Watchtower in the Zapotec language. In 1522 Spanish troops arrived and founded the current city, giving it the name Gueixolotitlan. However, by 1700 the name Huitzo had been adopted by the populace. When the first Roman Catholic monks arrived to evangelize the local population, they selected St. Paul the Apostle (San Pablo, in Spanish) as the patron saint of the village and erected a church by the same name. The church is notable for a large number of 16th-century and other colonial-era santos, statues of the saints. It was through the influence of the Catholic Church that the town arrived at its present name San Pablo Huitzo.

== Modern day ==
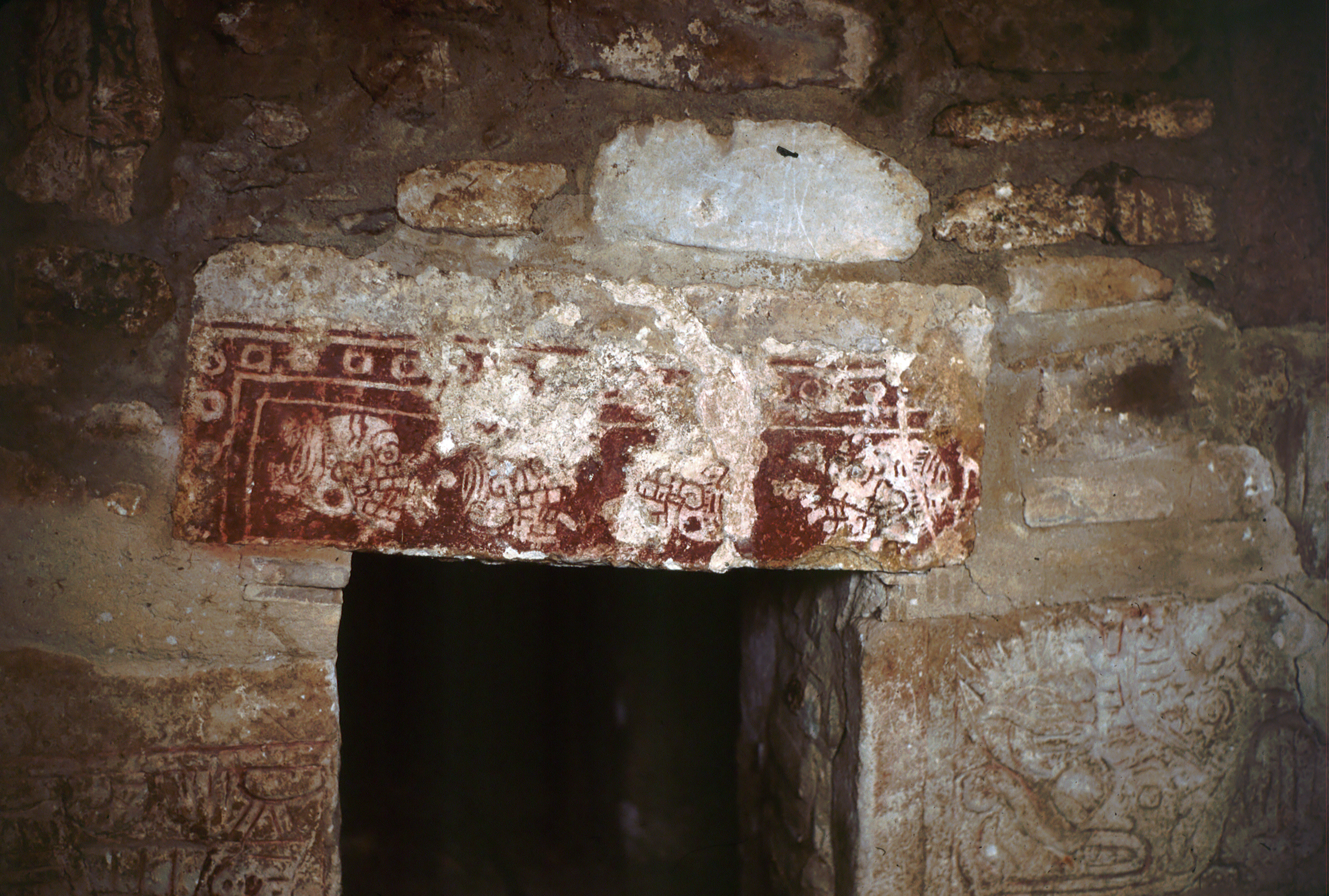
Post-classic era tomb in Huitzo

Today Huitzo is a farming community noted for growing vegetables and flowers, with almost half of its population employed by farms or other agriculture-related ventures. Archaeological sites in the area consist of several tombs, walls, and similar Zapotec structures. Most of the sites are overgrown with vegetation, however they do attract some tourists and archaeologists.
