= Guadalupe Etla =

- Municipality and town
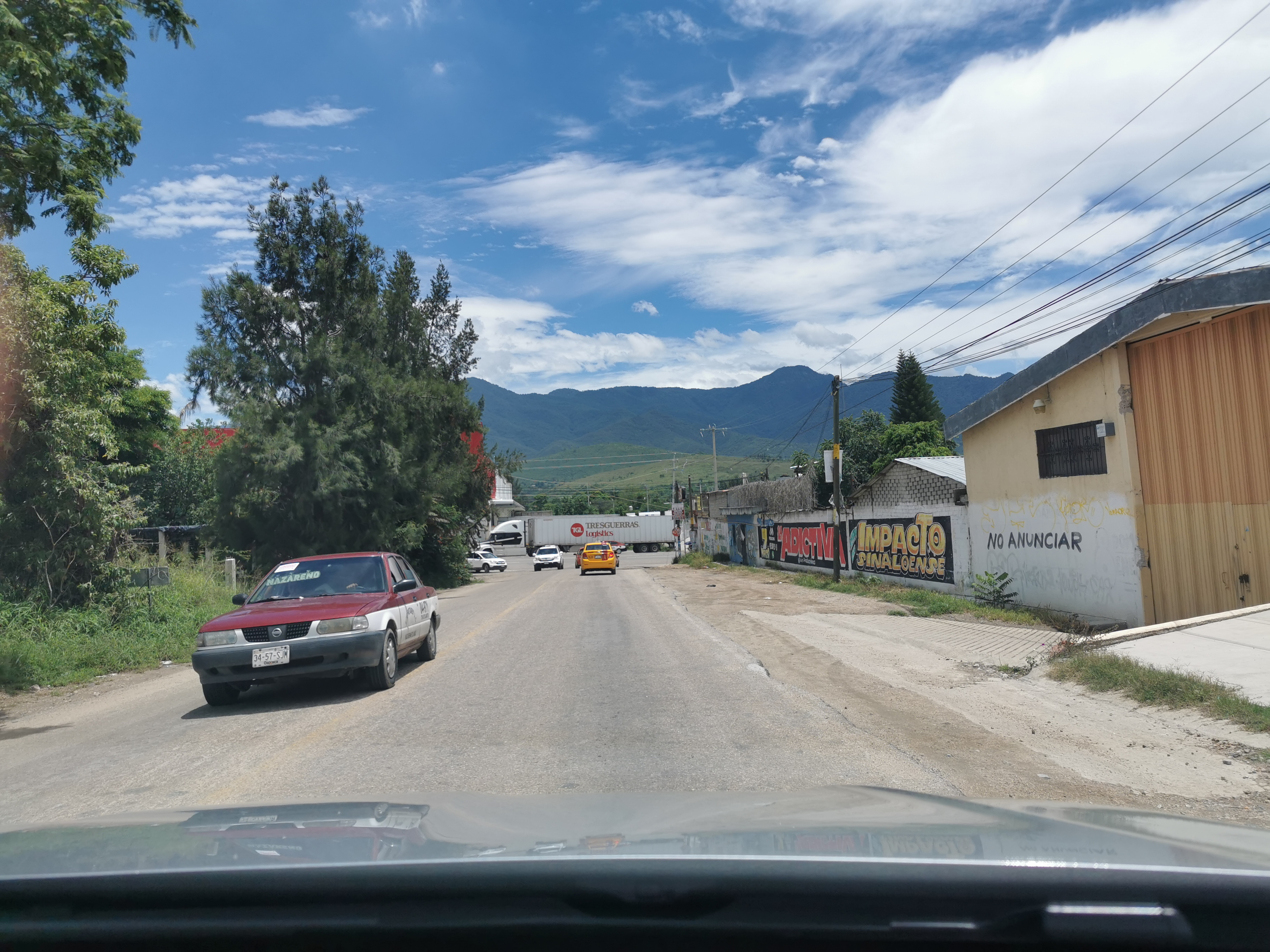

- Location in Mexico
- Coordinates: 17°10′N 96°49′W
- Country: Mexico
- State: Oaxaca

Area
  - Total: 17.86 km^{2} (6.90 sq mi)

Population (2010)
  - Total: 2,433
- Time zone: UTC-6 (Central Standard Time)

Guadalupe Etla is a village and municipality in the Mexican state of Oaxaca. The municipality has a total area of 17.86 km^{2}.

Guadalupe Etla is part of the region of the central valleys of Oaxaca.

Etla means "abounding beans" and comes from the Nahuatl words E ~ "bean" and Tia ~ "abundance"; and Guadalupe in honor of the Virgin of Guadalupe.

According to INEGI the total population of Guadalupe Etla in 2010 was 2,433.

== History ==
It is known that the chief Sebastián Ramírez de León together with other people donated the land where the municipality is located today, in addition to purchasing land from the town of Guelache.
