= Monte Albán =

Pre-Columbian archaeological site in Mexico

- Danipaguache
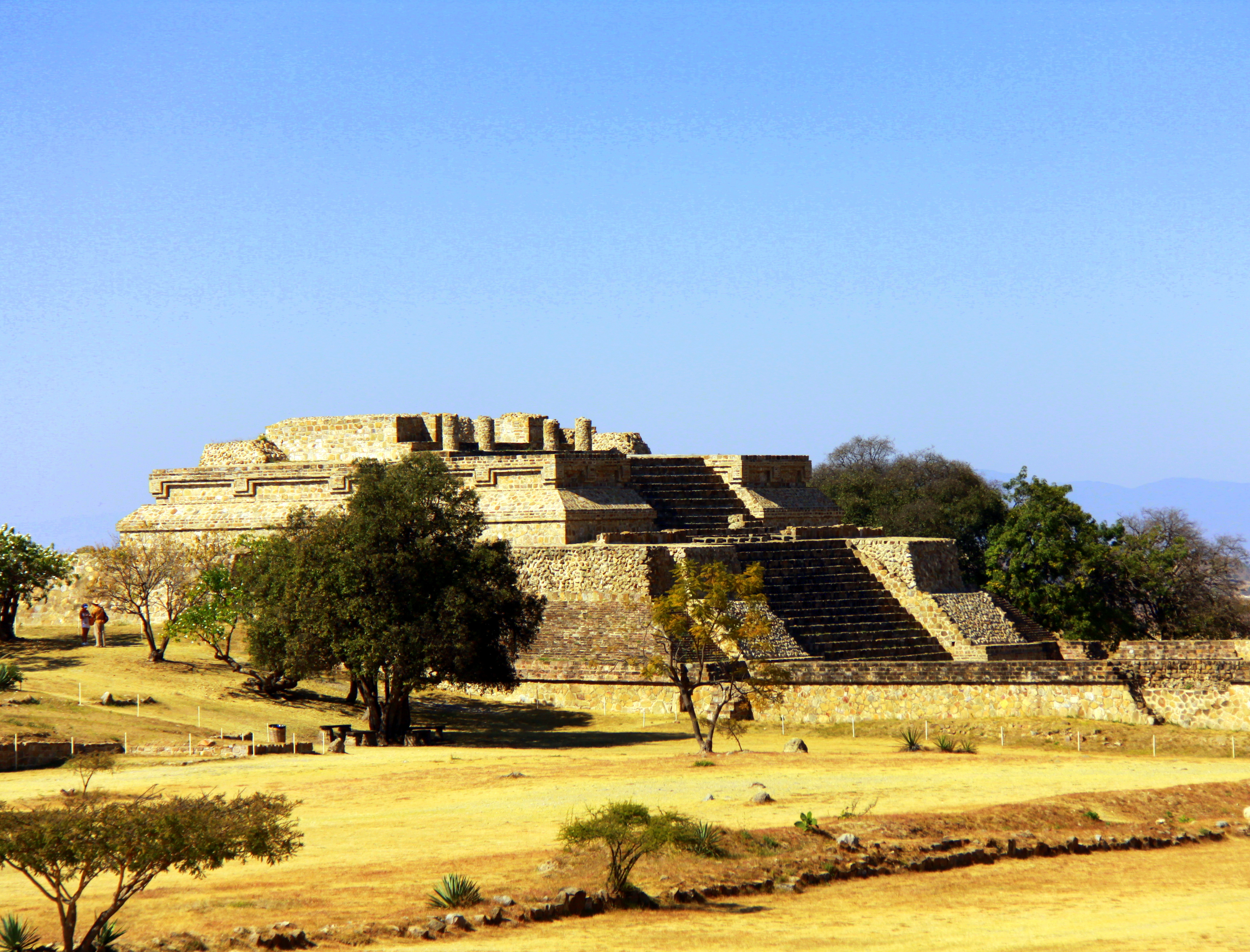
- The west side platform at the Monte Alban pyramid complex

- Location within Mesoamerica
- 17°2′38″N 96°46′4″W
- Periods: Middle Preclassic to Terminal Classic
- Location: Oaxaca, Mexico
- Region: Valley of Oaxaca

UNESCO World Heritage Site
- Official name: Historic Centre of Oaxaca and Archaeological Site of Monte Albán
- Type: Cultural
- Criteria: i, ii, iii, iv
- Designated: 1987 (11th session)
- Reference no.: 415
- Region: Latin America and the Caribbean

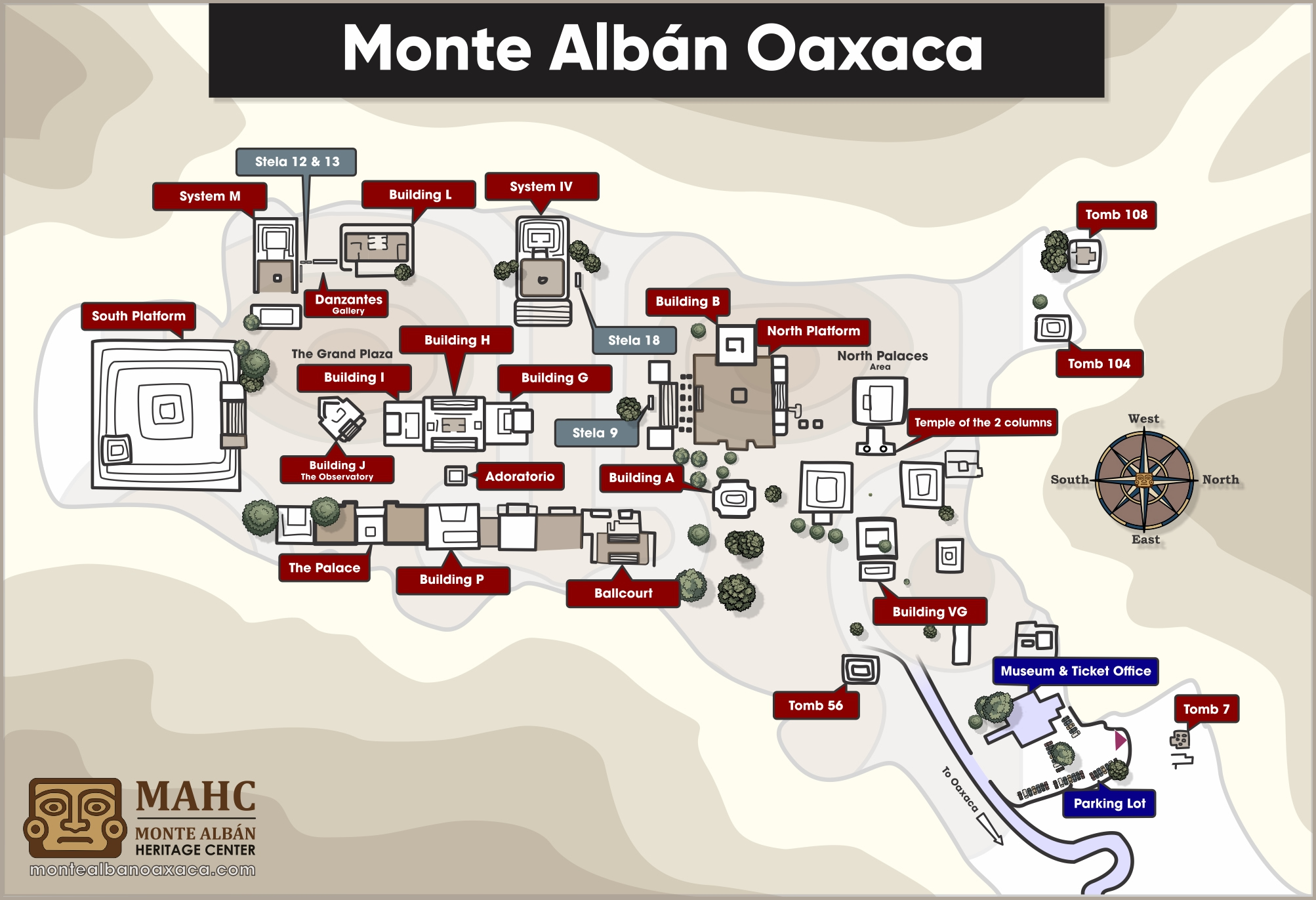
Handmade high-resolution map of Monte Albán, the ancient Zapotec archaeological site in Oaxaca, Mexico (2025).

Monte Albán is a large pre-Columbian archaeological site in the Santa Cruz Xoxocotlán Municipality in the southern Mexican state of Oaxaca (17.043° N, 96.767°W). The site is located on a low mountainous range rising above the plain in the central section of the Valley of Oaxaca, where the latter's northern Etla, eastern Tlacolula, and southern Zimatlán and Ocotlán (or Valle Grande) branches meet. The present-day state capital Oaxaca City is located approximately 9 km (6 mi) east of Monte Albán.

The partially excavated civic ceremonial center of the Monte Albán site is situated atop an artificially leveled ridge. It has an elevation of about 1,940 m (6,400 ft) above mean sea level and rises some 400 m (1,300 ft) from the valley floor, in an easily defensible location. In addition to the monumental core, the site is characterized by several hundred artificial terraces, and a dozen clusters of mounded architecture covering the entire ridgeline and surrounding flanks. The archaeological ruins on the nearby Atzompa and El Gallo hills to the north are traditionally considered to be an integral part of the ancient city as well.

Besides being one of the earliest cities of Mesoamerica, Monte Albán was important for nearly one thousand years as the pre-eminent Zapotec socio-political and economic center. Founded toward the end of the Middle Formative period at around 500 BC, by the Terminal Formative (c. 100 BC – AD 200) Monte Albán had become the capital of a large-scale expansionist polity that dominated much of the Oaxacan highlands and interacted with other Mesoamerican regional states, such as Teotihuacan to the north (Paddock 1983; Marcus 1983). The city lost its political pre-eminence by the end of the Late Classic (c. AD 500–750), and soon thereafter was largely abandoned. Small-scale reoccupation, opportunistic reuse of earlier structures and tombs, and ritual visitations marked the archaeological history of the site into the Colonial period.

The etymology of the site's present-day name is unclear. Tentative suggestions regarding its origin range from a presumed corruption of a native Zapotec name to a colonial-era reference to a Spanish soldier by the name Montalbán or to the Alban Hills of Italy. The ancient Zapotec name of the city is not known, as abandonment occurred centuries before the writing of the earliest available ethnohistorical sources.

== Research history ==
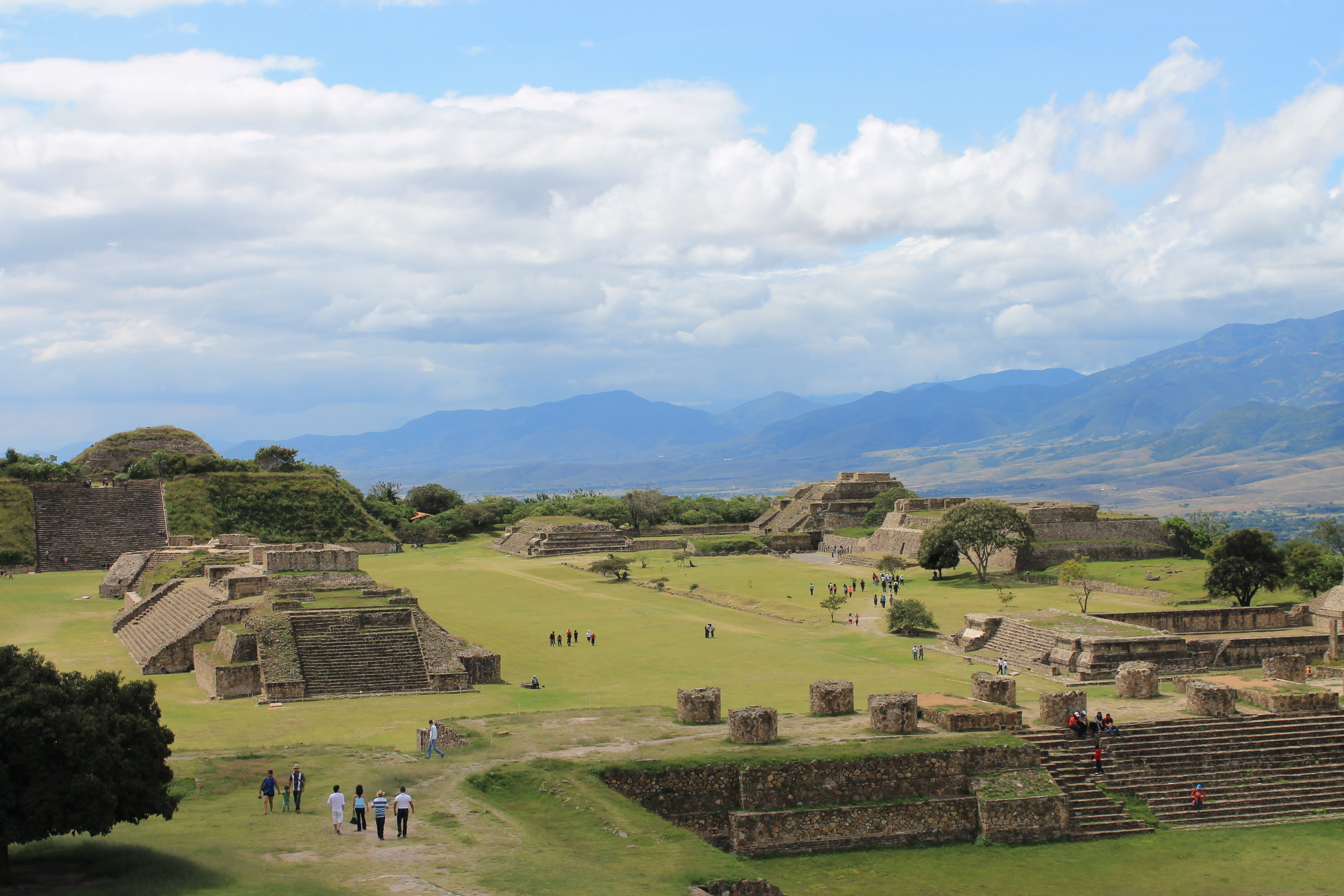
Panoramic showing a section of the North Platform in the foreground.

Being visible from anywhere in the central part of the Valley of Oaxaca, the impressive ruins of Monte Albán attracted visitors and explorers throughout the colonial and modern eras. Among others, Guillermo Dupaix investigated the site in the early 19th century CE, J. M. García published a description of the site in 1859, and A. F. Bandelier visited and published further descriptions in the 1890s. A first intensive archaeological exploration of the site was conducted in 1902 by Leopoldo Batres, then General Inspector of Monuments for the Mexican government under Porfirio Diaz.

It was not until 1931 that large-scale scientific excavations were undertaken, under the direction of Mexican archaeologist Alfonso Caso. In 1933, Eulalia Guzmán assisted with the excavation of Tomb 7. Over the following eighteen years, Caso and his colleagues Ignacio Bernal and Jorge Acosta excavated large sections within the monumental core of the site. Much of what is visible today in areas open to the public was reconstructed at that time. Besides resulting in the excavation of a large number of residential and civic-ceremonial structures and hundreds of tombs and burials, one lasting achievement of the project by Caso and his colleagues was the establishment of a ceramic chronology (phases Monte Albán I through V) for the period between the site's founding in c. 500 BCE to end of the Postclassic period in CE 1521.

The investigation of the periods preceding Monte Albán's founding was a major focus in the late 1960s of the Prehistory and Human Ecology Project started by Kent Flannery of the University of Michigan. Over the following two decades, this project documented the development of socio-political complexity in the valley from the earliest Archaic period (c. 8000–2000 BCE) to the Rosario phase (700–500 BCE) immediately preceding Monte Albán. It set the stage for an understanding of the latter's founding and developmental trajectory. In this context, among the major accomplishments of Flannery's work in Oaxaca are his extensive excavations at the important formative center of San José Mogote in the Etla branch of the valley, a project co-directed with Joyce Marcus of the University of Michigan.

A further important step in the understanding of the history of occupation of the Monte Albán site was reached with the Prehistoric Settlement Patterns in the Valley of Oaxaca Project begun by Richard Blanton and several colleagues from the University of Michigan in the early 1970s. Their intensive survey and mapping of the entire site demonstrated the full scale and size of Monte Albán, beyond the limited area which had been explored by Caso. Subsequent seasons of the same project under the direction of Blanton, Gary Feinman, Steve Kowalewski, Linda Nicholas, and others extended the survey coverage to practically the entire valley, producing an invaluable amount of data on the region's changing settlement patterns from the earliest times to the arrival of the Spanish in CE 1521.

== Site history ==
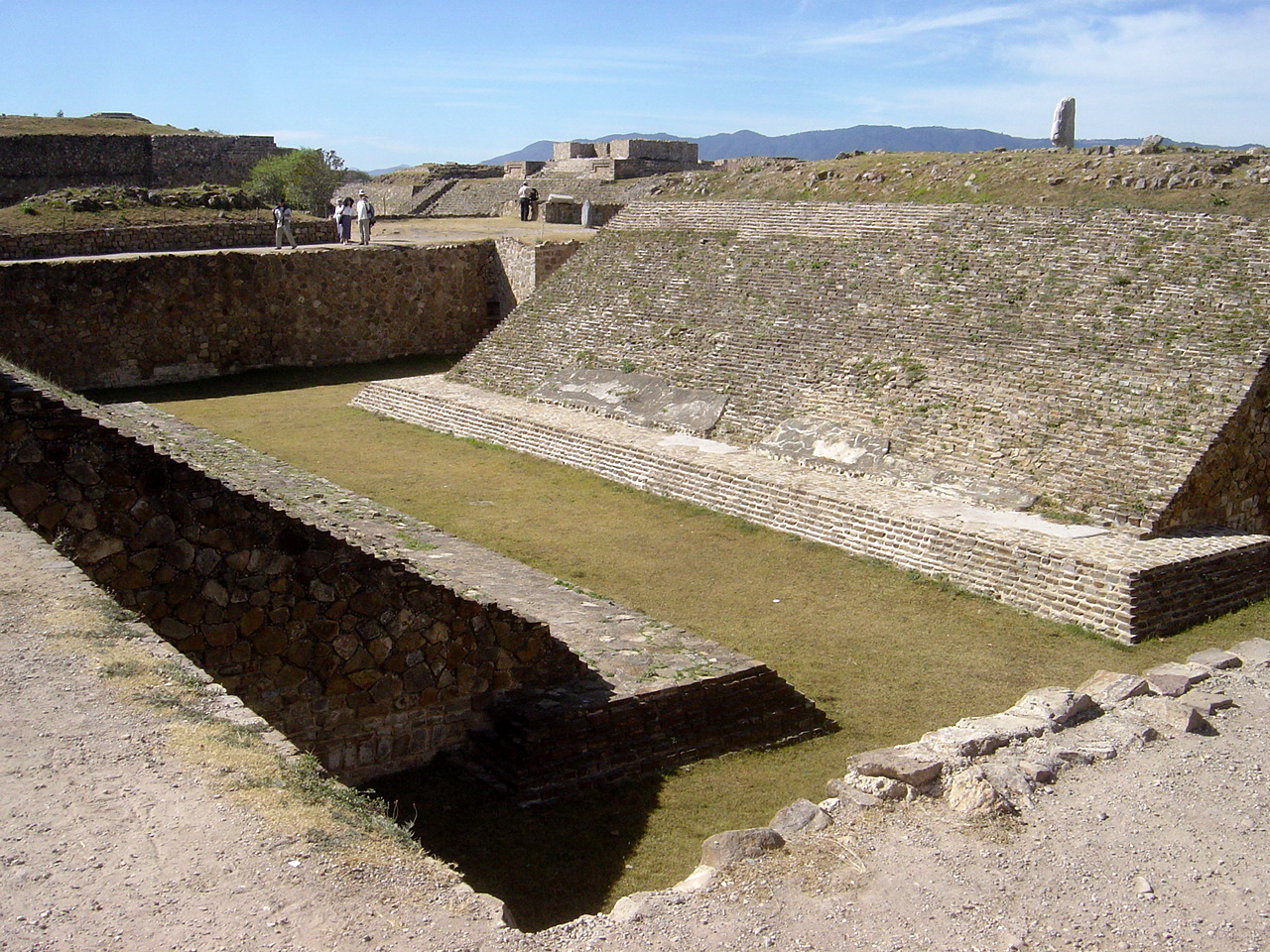
Ballgame court

As indicated by Blanton's survey of the site, the Monte Albán hills appear to have been uninhabited prior to 500 BCE (the end of the Rosario ceramic phase). At that time, San José Mogote was the major population center in the valley and base of a chiefdom that likely controlled much of the northern Etla branch. Perhaps as many as three or four other, smaller chiefly centers controlled other sub-regions of the valley, including Tilcajete in the southern Valle Grande branch and Yegüih in the Tlacolula arm to the east. Competition and warfare seem to have characterized the Rosario phase. The regional survey data suggests the existence of an unoccupied buffer zone between the San José Mogote chiefdom and those to the south and east.

It is within this no-man's land that Monte Albán was founded at the end of the Rosario period and it quickly reached a population estimate of around 5,200 by the end of the following Monte Albán Ia phase (c. 300 BCE). This remarkable population increase was accompanied by an equally rapid decline at San José Mogote and neighbouring satellite sites, making it likely that its chiefly elites were directly involved in the founding of the future Zapotec capital. This rapid shift in population and settlement, from dispersed localized settlements to a central urban site in a previously unsettled area, has been referred to as the “Monte Alban Synoikism” by Marcus and Flannery, in reference to similar recorded instances in the Mediterranean area in antiquity.

Although it was previously thought that a similar process of large-scale abandonment, and thus participation in the founding of Monte Albán, occurred at other major chiefly centers, such as Yegüih and Tilcajete, at least in the latter's case this now appears to be unlikely. A recent project directed by Charles Spencer and Elsa Redmond of the American Museum of Natural History in New York has shown that, rather than being abandoned, the site grew significantly in population during the periods Monte Albán Early I and Late I (c. 500–300 BCE and 300–100 BCE, respectively). Tilcajete might have actively opposed incorporation into the increasingly powerful Monte Albán state.

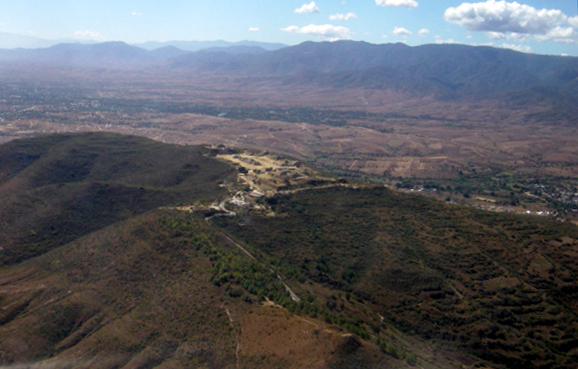
Aerial view of Monte Albán

By the beginning of the Terminal Formative (Monte Albán II phase, c. 100 BCE – CE 200), Monte Albán had an estimated population of 17,200, making it one of the largest Mesoamerican cities at the time. As its political power grew, Monte Albán expanded militarily, through cooption, and via outright colonization, into several areas outside the Valley of Oaxaca, including the Cañada de Cuicatlán to the north and the southern Ejutla and Sola de Vega valleys. (Feinman and Nicholas 1990) During this period and into the subsequent Early Classic (Monte Albán IIIA phase, c. CE 200–500), Monte Albán was the capital of a major regional polity that exerted a dominating influence over the Valley of Oaxaca and across much of the Oaxacan highlands. Evidence at Monte Albán is suggestive of high-level contacts between the site's elites and those at the powerful central Mexican city of Teotihuacan, where archaeologists have identified a neighbourhood inhabited by ethnic Zapotecs from the valley of Oaxaca (Paddock 1983). By the Late Classic (Monte Albán IIIB/IV, c. CE 500–1000), the site's influence outside and inside the valley declined. Elites at several other centers, once part of the Monte Albán state, began to assert their autonomy, including sites such as Cuilapan and Zaachila in the Valle Grande and Lambityeco, Mitla, and El Palmillo in the eastern Tlacolula arm. The latter is the focus of an ongoing project by Gary Feinman and Linda Nicholas of Chicago's Field Museum (Feinman and Nicholas 2002). By the end of the same period (c. AD 900–1000), the ancient capital was largely abandoned. The once powerful Monte Albán state was replaced by dozens of competing smaller polities, a situation that lasted up to the Spanish conquest.

The following table synthesizes the chronological phases, ceramic diagnostics, demographic estimates, and socio-political developments of Monte Albán established by regional surveys and stratigraphic excavations:

Chronological Sequence, Ceramic Phases, and Urban Development of Monte Albán
Phase	Approximate Dates	Period	Diagnostic Ceramic & Material Markers	Demographic & Architectural Milestones
Monte Albán Early I	500–300 BCE	Middle Formative	Gray ware pottery (*gris*) with incised rims; early Danzantes carved stones	Initial urban synoikism; population reaches ~5,200; artificial terracing of mountaintop begun.
Monte Albán Late I	300–100 BCE	Late Formative	Widespread paste gray ware, composite silhouette bowls, and cream-slipped ceramics	Expansion to ~17,000 inhabitants; fortification wall construction begins on northern/western slopes.
Monte Albán II	100 BCE – 200 CE	Terminal Formative	Fine paste yellow-red wares, basal-flanged bowls, and Building J "conquest slabs"	Imperial expansion into Cañada de Cuicatlán and Ejutla; formalization of two-room temple architecture.
Monte Albán IIIA	200–500 CE	Early Classic	Thin Orange ceramic imports, Teotihuacan-style cylindrical tripod vessels, and carved stelae	Apex of regional hegemony; diplomatic interaction with Teotihuacan; construction of monumental Main Plaza platforms.
Monte Albán IIIB–IV	500–850 / 1000 CE	Late Classic / Epiclassic	G-35 gray composite bowls, effigy urns dedicated to Cocijo, and stone lintel carvings	Gradual political fragmentation; population disperses to valley centers (Mitla, Zaachila, Lambityeco); site core largely abandoned.
Monte Albán V	1000–1521 CE	Postclassic	Polychrome ceramics, Mixtec-style gold metallurgy, and bone carvings	Opportunistic reuse of Classic tombs (notably Tomb 7); ritual pilgrimages without permanent urban civic occupation.

== Monuments ==
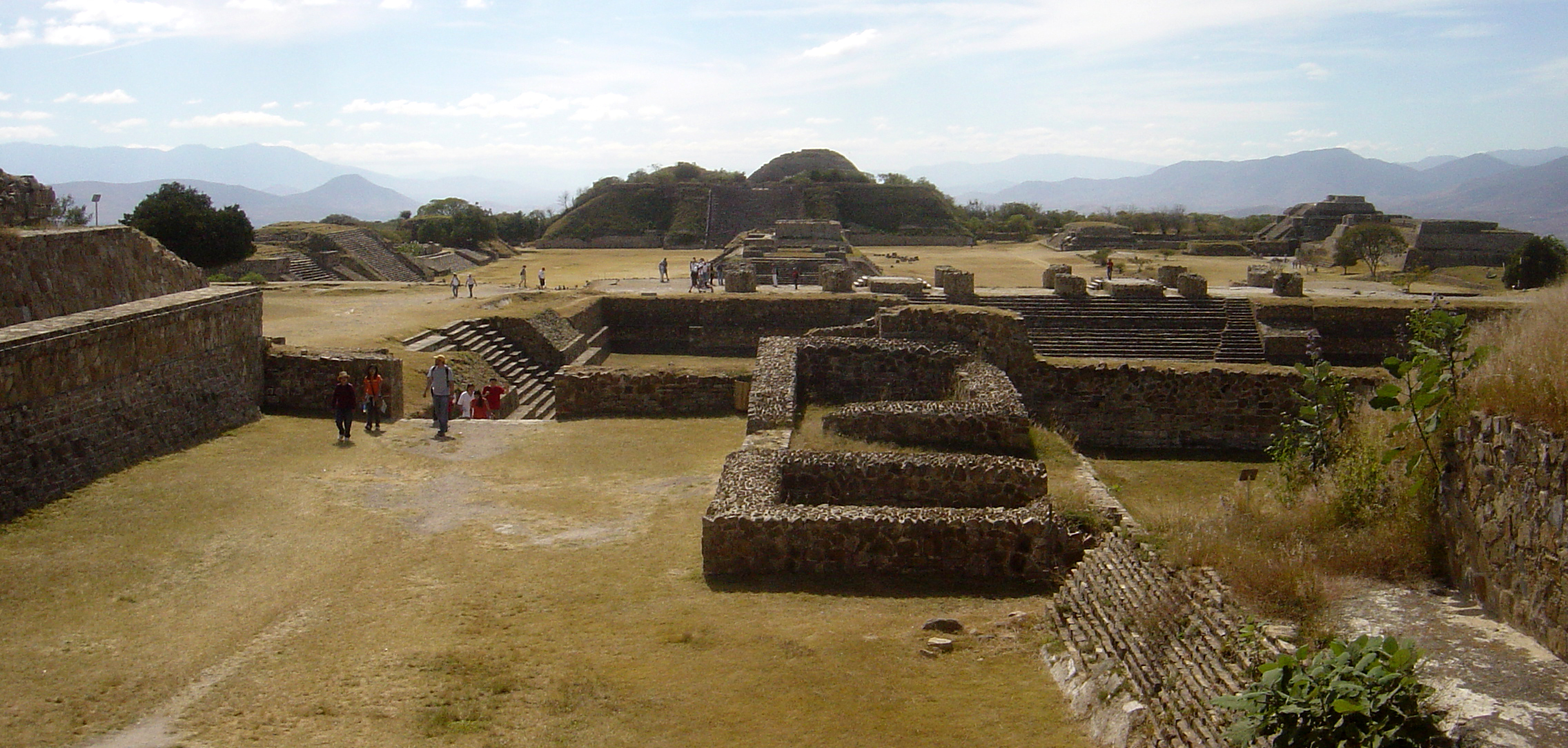
View of Main Plaza from the North Platform. The South Platform can be seen in the distance.

The monumental center of Monte Albán is the Main Plaza, which measures approximately 300 meters by 150 meters. The Main Plaza was created through artificial levelling of the mountaintop, being covered in white plaster afterwards. The plaza would have had the capacity to hold the entire population of the city for participation in state-sponsored rituals. The site's main civic-ceremonial and elite-residential structures are located around it or in its immediate vicinity. Most of these have been explored and restored by Alfonso Caso and his colleagues.

To the north and south the Main Plaza is delimited by large platforms accessible from the plaza via monumental staircases. On its eastern and western sides, the plaza is similarly bounded by a number of smaller platform mounds, on which stood temples and elite residences, as well as one of two ballcourts known to have existed at the site. A north-south spine of mounds occupies the center of the plaza and similarly served as platforms for ceremonial structures. The majority of the temples faced in the east or west directions, aligning with the sun's path. The temples were constructed with a characteristic two-room floor plan: a communal porch situated at the front, connected to a lesser revealed sanctuary at the backend. This collection of sacred venues may have been dedicated to royal ancestors, who acted as supplicants to Cocijo.

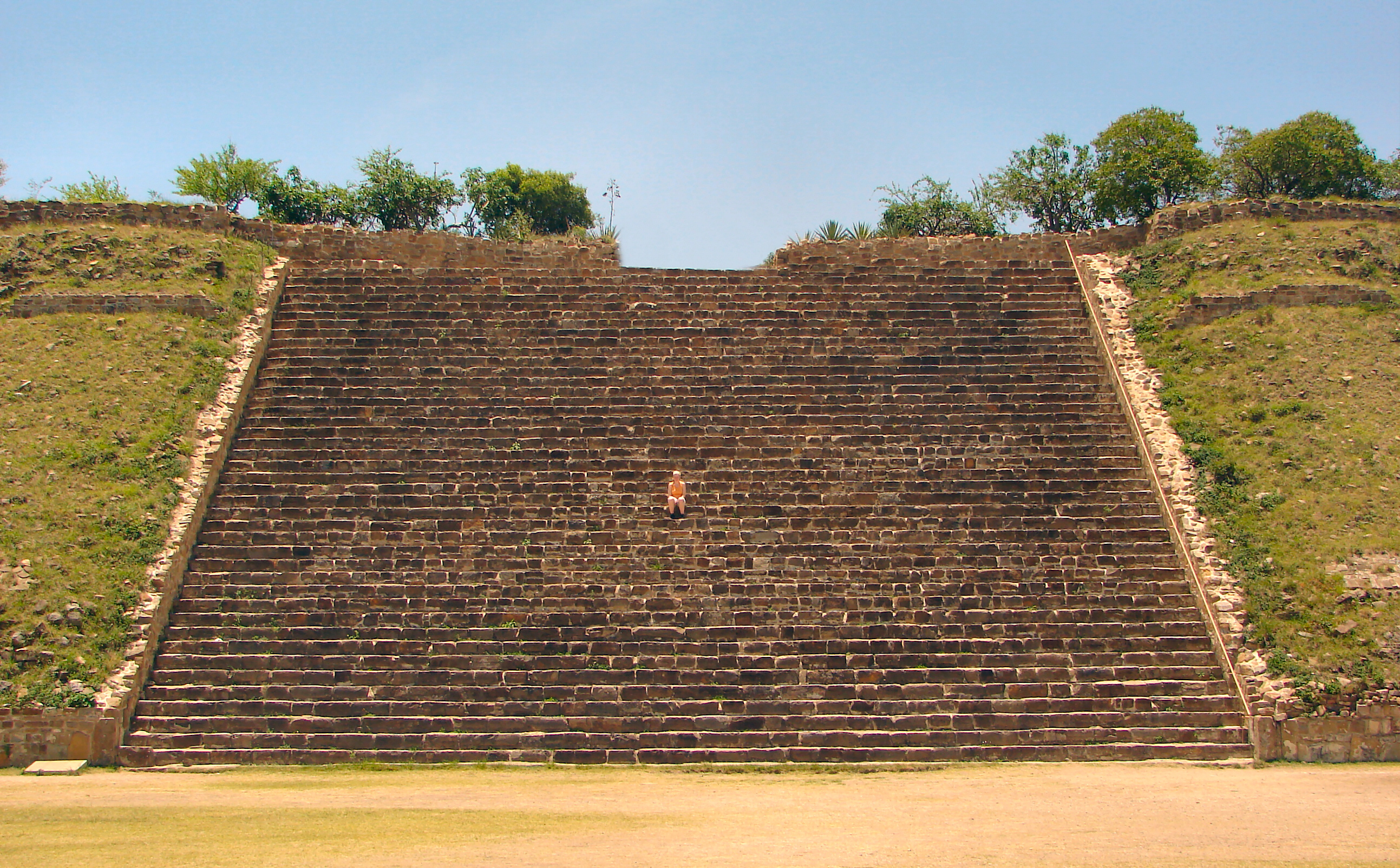
The impressive stairs leading up to the South Platform.

One characteristic of Monte Albán is the large number of carved stone monuments throughout the plaza. The earliest examples are the so-called "Danzantes" (literally, dancers), found mostly in the vicinity of Building L. These represent naked men in contorted and twisted poses, some of them genitally mutilated. The figures are said to represent sacrificial victims, which explains the morbid characteristics of the figures. The Danzantes feature physical traits characteristic of Olmec culture. The 19th-century notion that they depict dancers is now largely discredited. These monuments, dating to the earliest period of occupation at the site (Monte Albán I), are now interpreted as representing tortured, sacrificed war prisoners, some identified by name. They may depict leaders of competing centers and villages captured by Monte Albán.(Blanton et al. 1996) Over 300 “Danzantes” stones have been recorded to date, and some of the better preserved ones can be viewed at the site's museum. There is some indication that the Zapotecs had writing and calendrical notation.

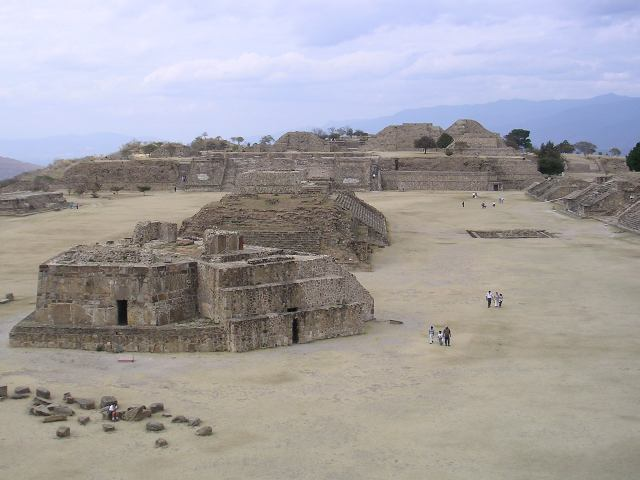
Building J, Monte Albán archeological site, Oaxaca.

A different type of carved stones is found on the nearby Building J in the center of the Main Plaza, a building also characterized by its unusual arrow-like shape and an orientation that differs from most other structures at the site. Inserted within the building walls are more than 40 large, carved slabs dating to Monte Albán II. They depict place-names, occasionally accompanied by additional writing and in many cases characterized by upside-down heads. Alfonso Caso was the first to identify these stones as "conquest slabs", likely listing places which the Monte Albán elites claimed to have conquered and/or controlled. Some of the places listed on Building J slabs have been tentatively identified. In one case (the Cañada de Cuicatlán region in northern Oaxaca), Zapotec conquest there has been confirmed through archaeological survey and excavations.

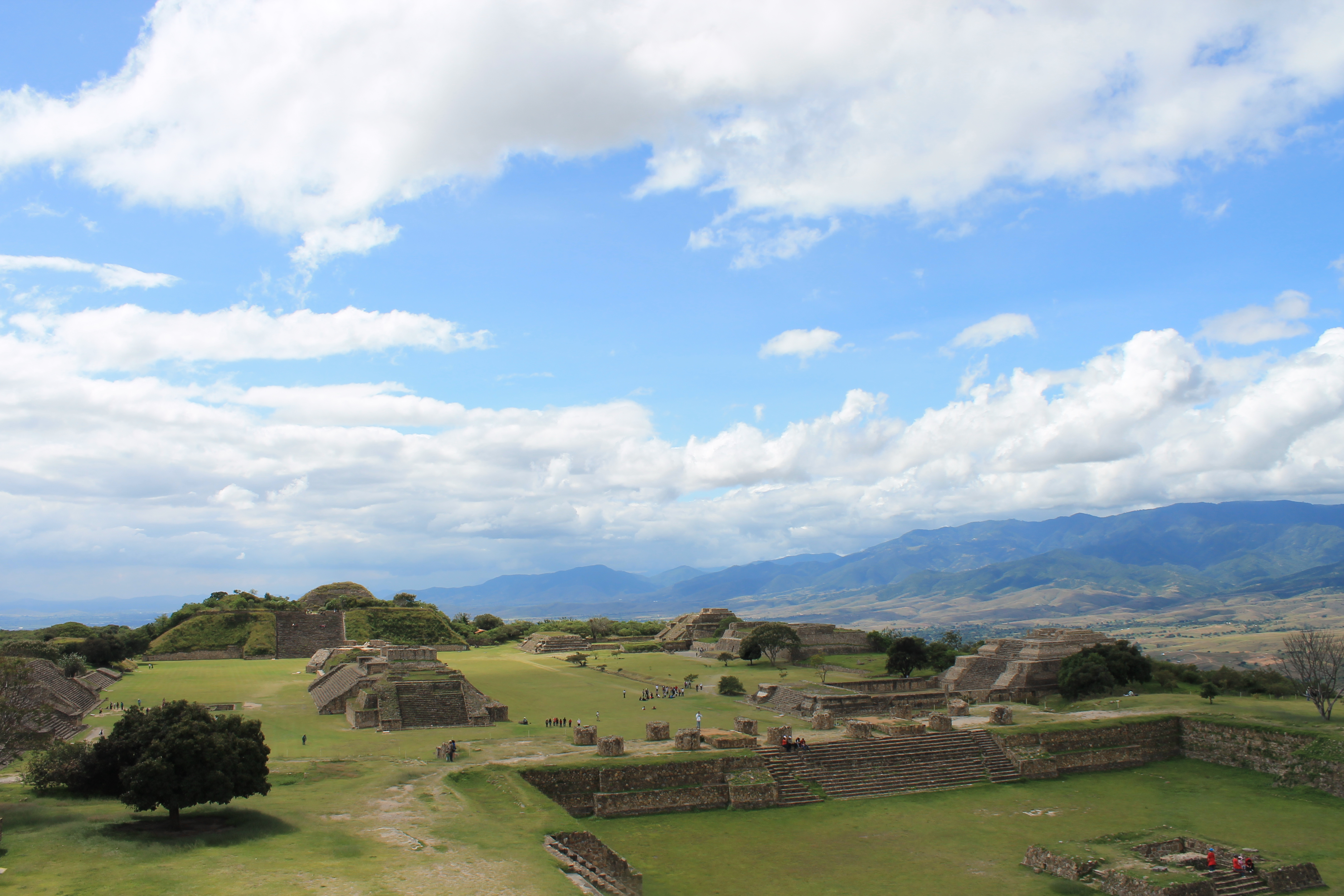
Monte Alban's panorama

The site of Monte Alban contains several pieces of evidence, through its architecture, to suggest that there was social stratification within the settlement. Walls ranging up to nine meters tall and twenty meters wide were built around the settlement; these would not only have created a boundary between Monte Alban and neighboring settlements, but also proved the power of the elites within the community. In Scott Hutson's analysis of the relationships between the commoners and the elites in Monte Alban, he notes that the monumental mounds found within the site seemed to be evenly spaced throughout the area. The mounds were thus close enough to each house to easily keep them under surveillance. Hutson also notes that, over time, the style of houses seemed to have changed, becoming more private to those living in the buildings and making it harder for outsiders to obtain information about the residents. These changes in the ability of the elites to gain information about the private lives of other citizens would have played a key role in the internal political structure of the settlement.

Many of the artifacts excavated at Monte Albán, in over a century of archaeological exploration, can be seen at the Museo Nacional de Antropologia in Mexico City and at the Museo Regional de Oaxaca, located in the Church of Santo Domingo de Guzmán in Oaxaca City. The latter museum houses many of the objects discovered in 1932 by Alfonso Caso in Monte Albán's Tomb 7, a Classic period Zapotec tomb that was opportunistically reused in Postclassic times for the burial of Mixtec elite individuals. Their burials were accompanied by some of the most spectacular burial offerings of any site in the Americas.

Monte Albán is a popular tourist destination for visitors to Oaxaca. Its small museum on site displays mostly original carved stones from the site. The site received 429,702 visitors in 2017.

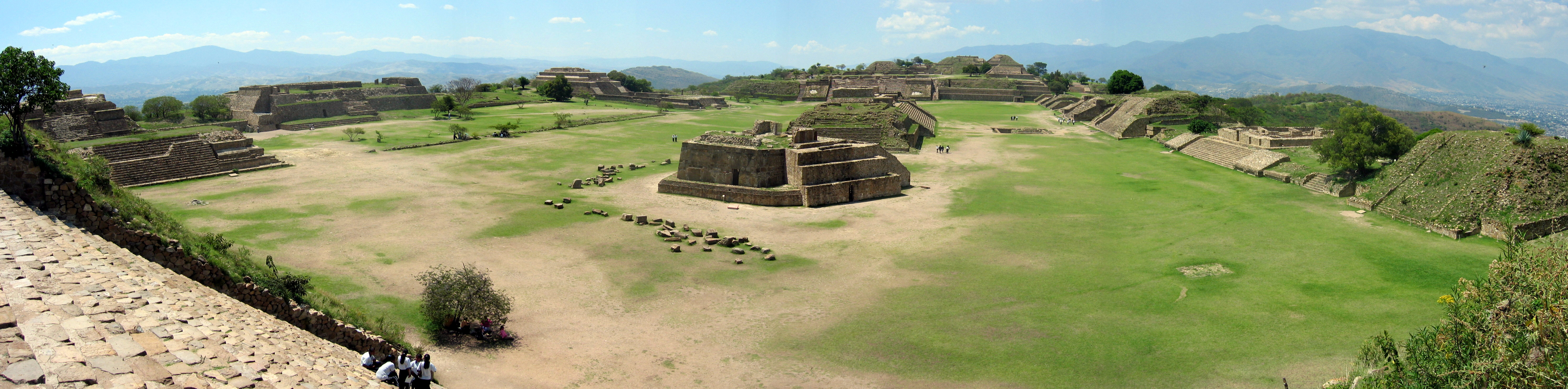
Panorama of Monte Albán from the South Platform.

== Threats ==
The primary threat to this archaeological site is urban growth, which is encroaching and "threatening to expand into territories that have potential archaeological value." To complicate matters, the administration of the site is divided among four different municipalities, making a unified effort to stop the urban encroachment challenging.

== Architecture ==
Symmetry was not a major concern for the layout of Monte Albán plaza. Although the angles within the plaza are not perfect 90-degree corners, the plaza appears to be a rectangle without actually being so. The structures are not laid out in a symmetrical fashion, as the distances between the structures vary greatly from building to building. Construction methods used for orientation changed as Monte Albán expanded. Early structures, on the western side of the plaza, are rotated south of east, while later structures align more with the cardinal directions.

The exception is the structure referred to as building “J.” This structure is located on the center line of the plaza but it is rotated and does not align with the other structures. It is believed that building “J” had an astronomical relation/ significance. Its steps are aligned perpendicular to the rising of the star of Capella at that time, so that a person looking out a doorway on the building would have faced it directly. Capella is significant as its heliacal rising took place within a day of the Sun passing directly overhead over Monte Albán. In design / construction of the structures, earthquakes were also taken into consideration. Thick walls were often used in construction, as well as sloped sides when constructing tall / larger structures.

Elite residencies were made up of three to four rooms, encompassing an inner patio and sub-patio tomb accessible via stairway. Classical tombs of the elite were walled with stone and often adorned in painted murals. Civilians lived on residential terraces that coated the slopes of the mountain below the Main Plaza. Such residencies were one or two room adobe brick houses with a central, partially enclosed patio.

== Agriculture ==
Monte Albán was not just a fortress or sacred place, but a fully functioning city. The inhabitants had come from the rich agricultural land below Monte Albán and depended greatly on agriculture. However, agriculture at Monte Albán was riskier than in the nearby valleys due to lack of permanent water sources and unreliable rainfall. Residents invested in terraces, irrigation, and adobe housing structures to help offset environmental risks and anchoring residents to the new center.

== Gallery ==
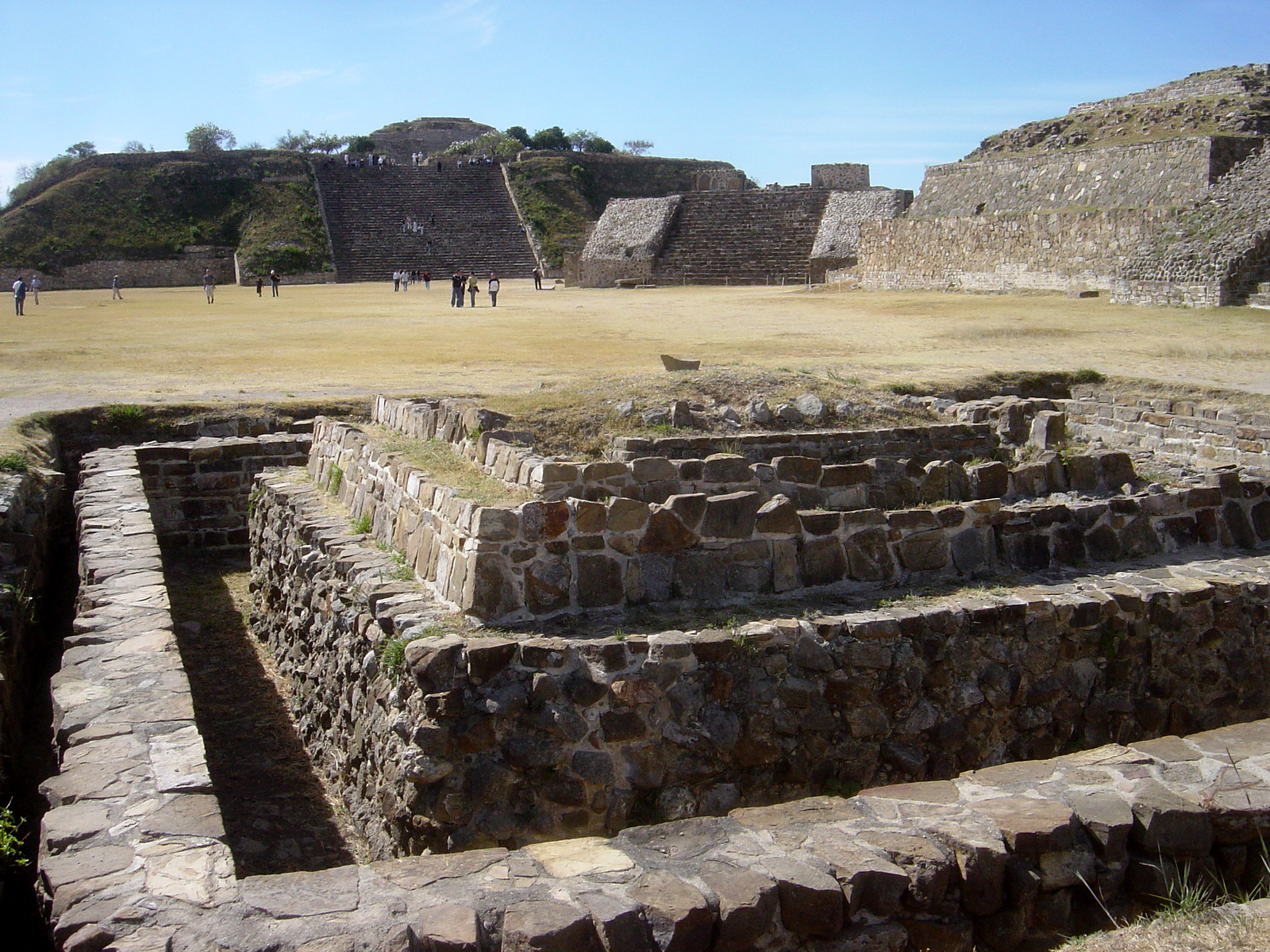
Altar

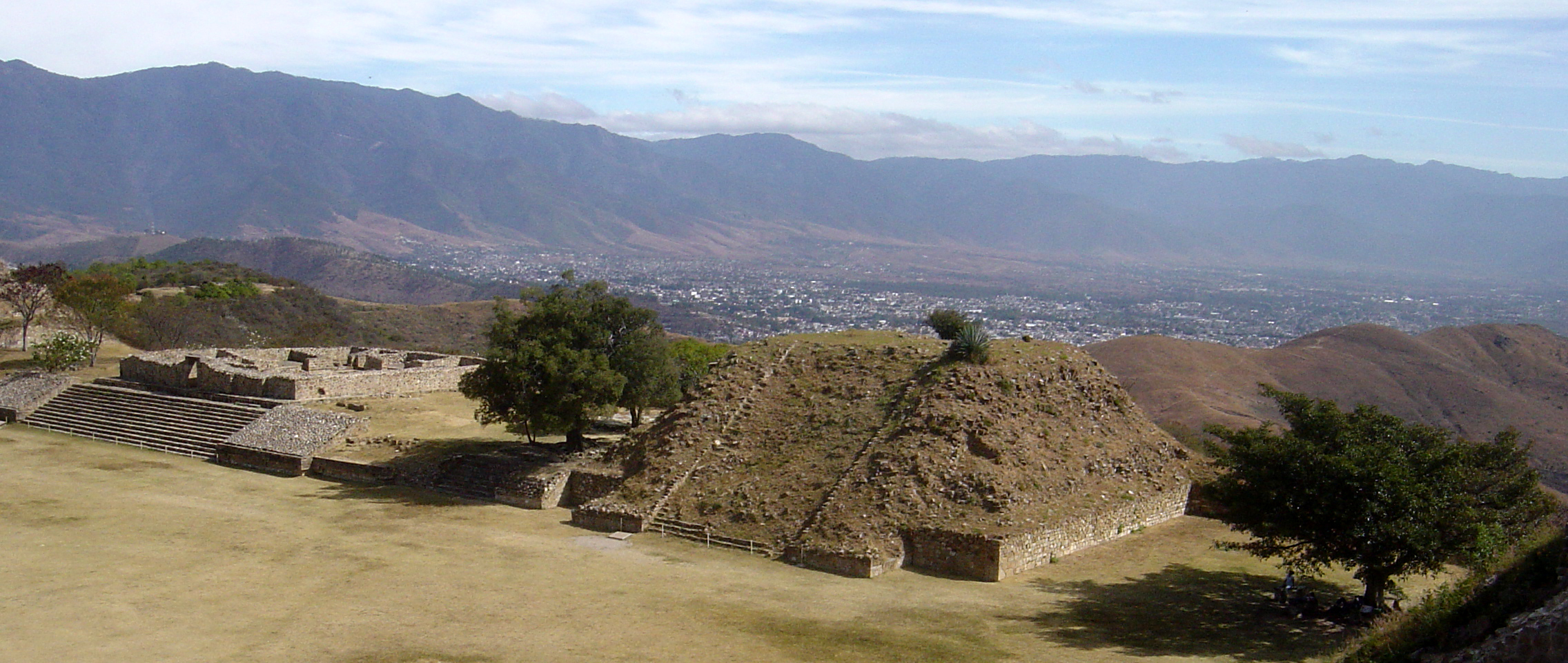
Unrestored section of Monte Albán with Oaxaca City in the background

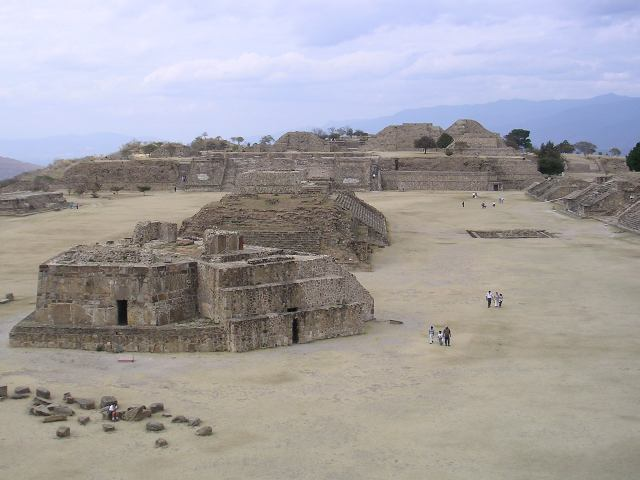
View of Main Plaza from the South Platform, with Building J in the foreground.

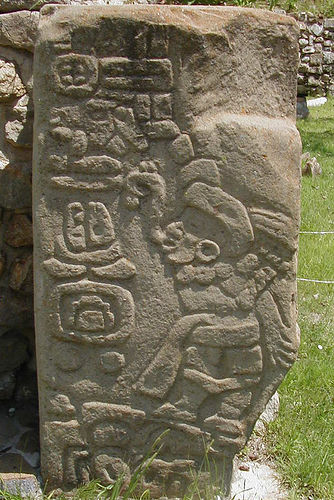

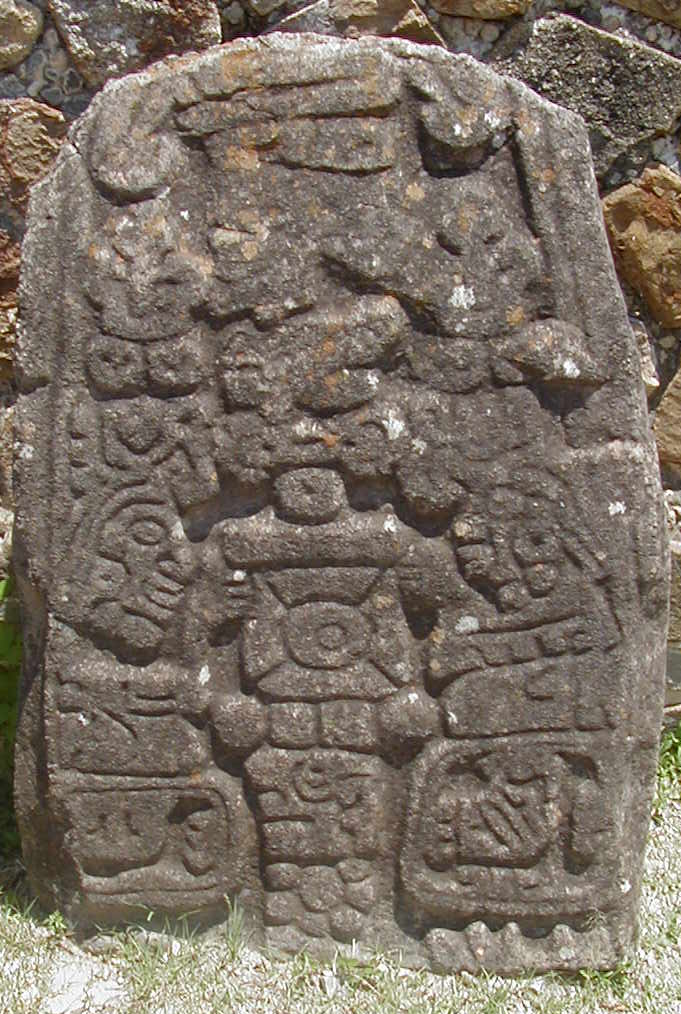

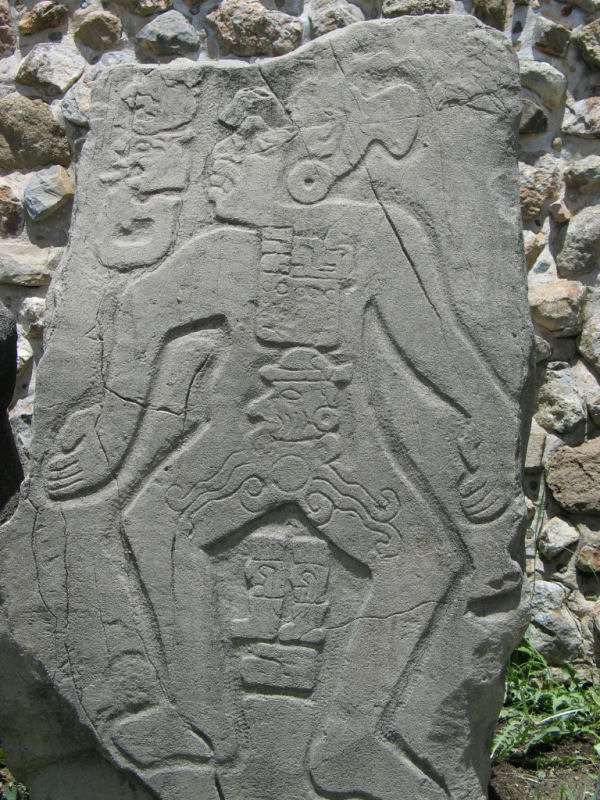
One of the stelae known as Dancing by unorthodox positions of the characters represented.

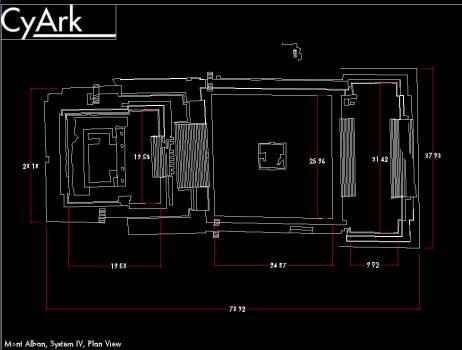
Plan of Monte Alban's System IV structure, cut from a 3D laser scan image.

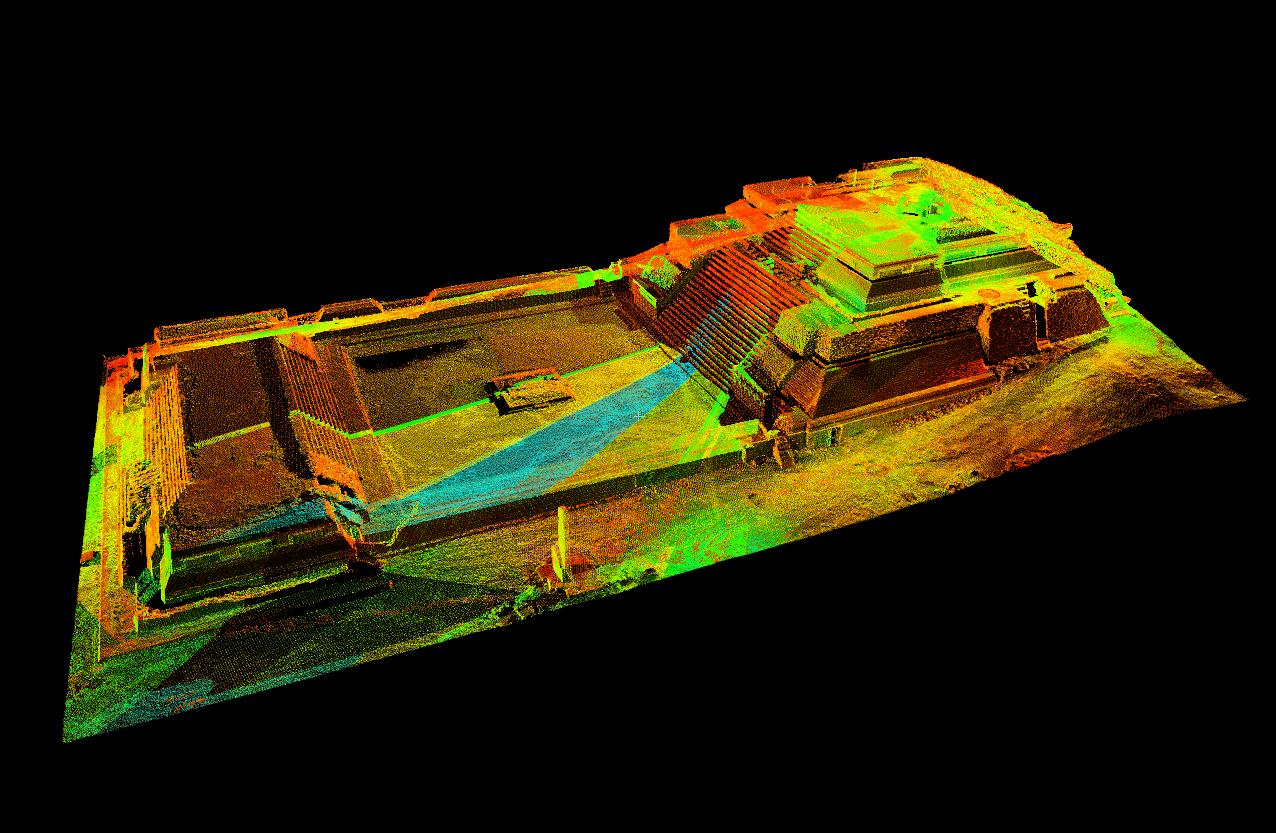
Image of Monte Alban's System IV structure, taken from a 3D laser scan image.

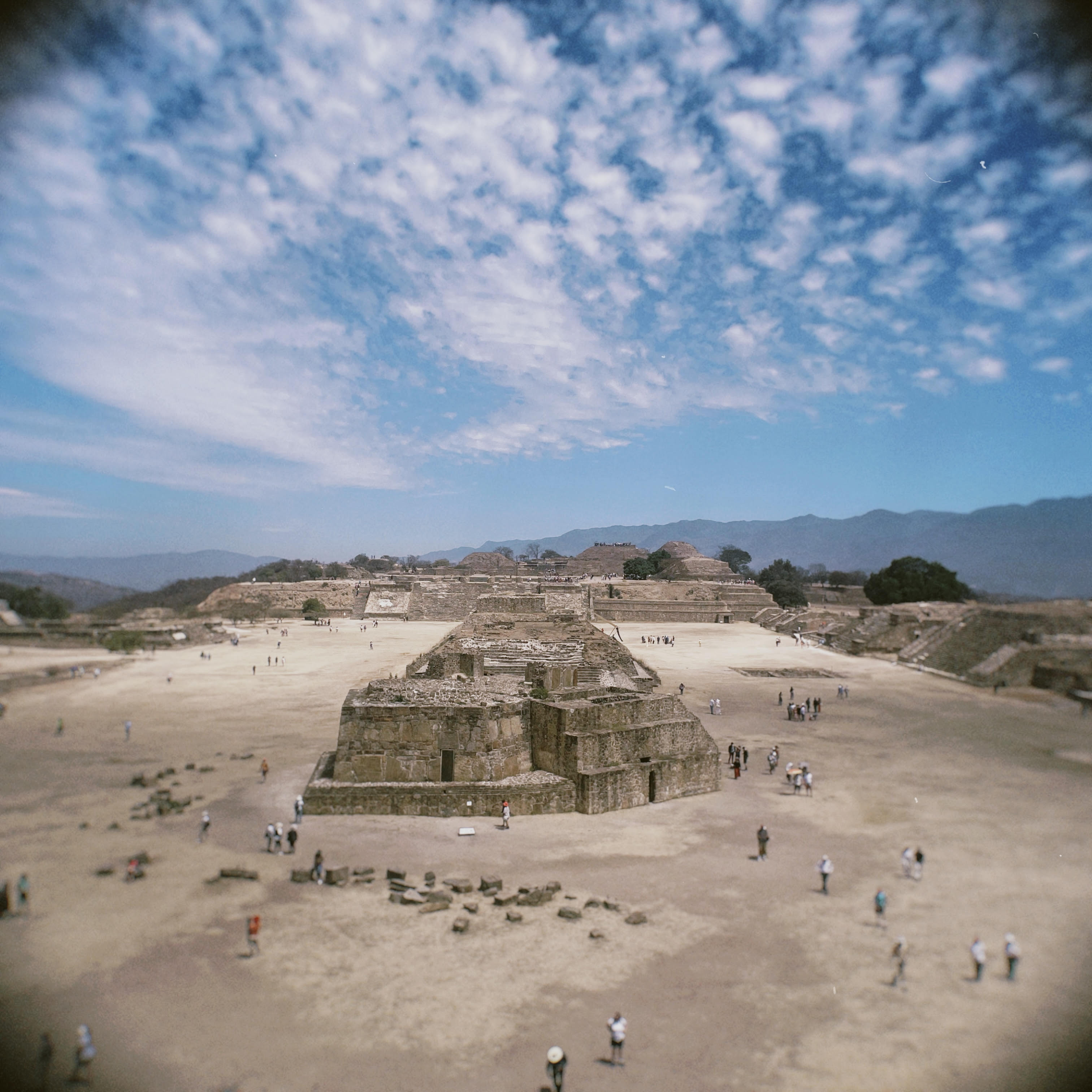
View across Main Plaza from the South Platform, with Building J in the foreground in 2024.

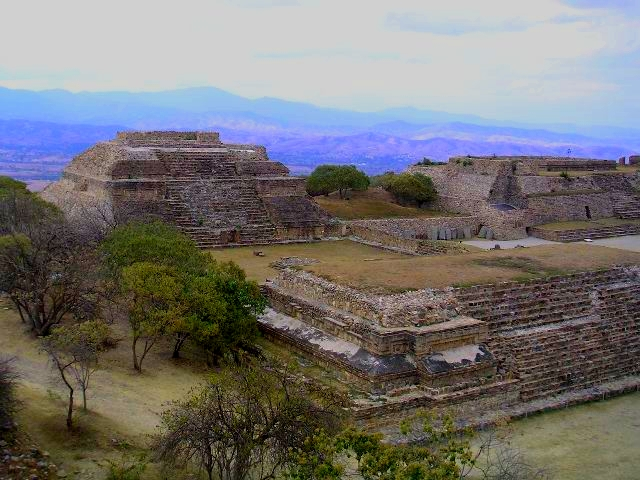
Building M as seen from the South Platform.

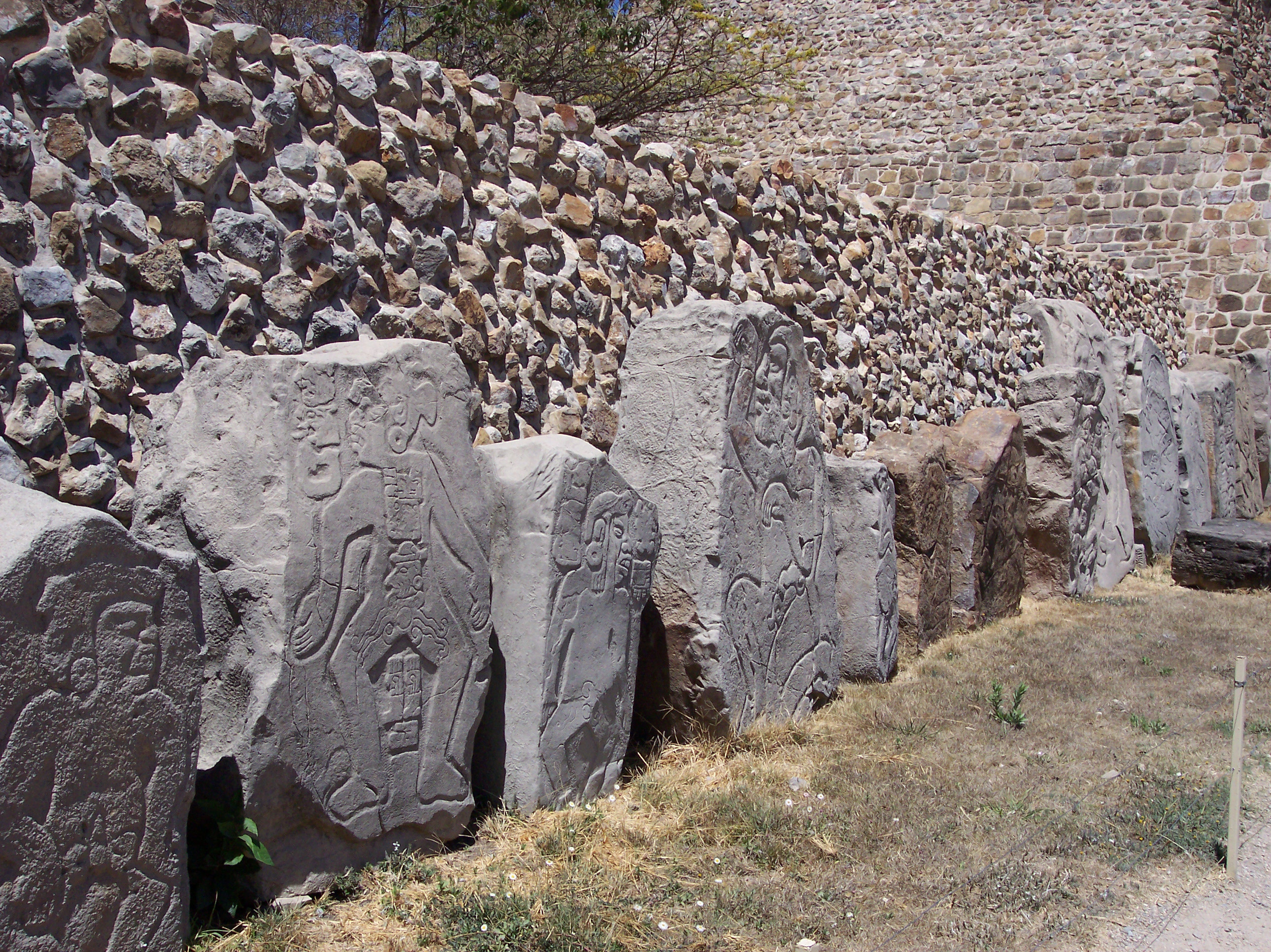
Stones of the Dancers, in the Plaza of the Dancers, next to Building L.

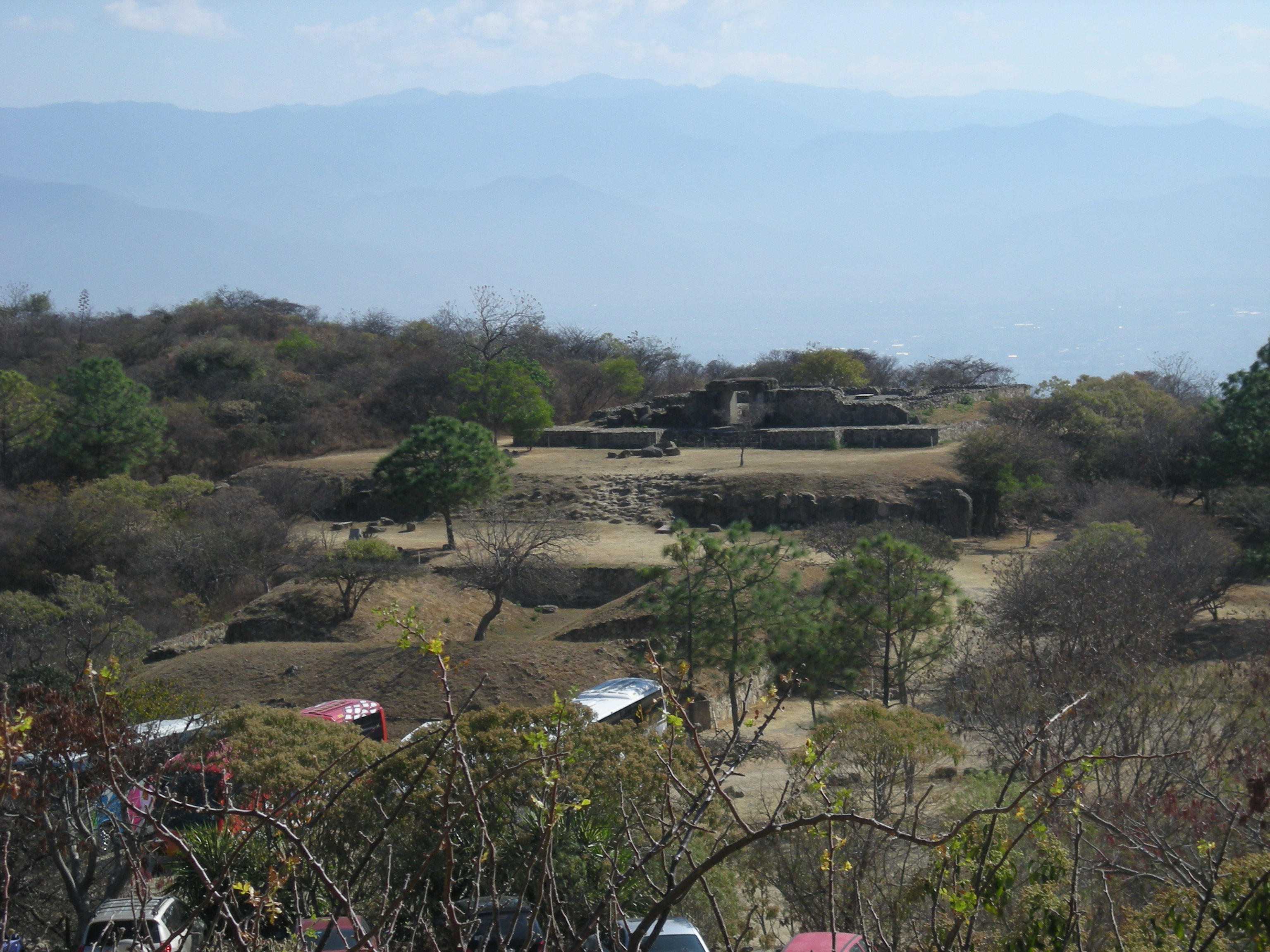
Tomb north of the North Platform

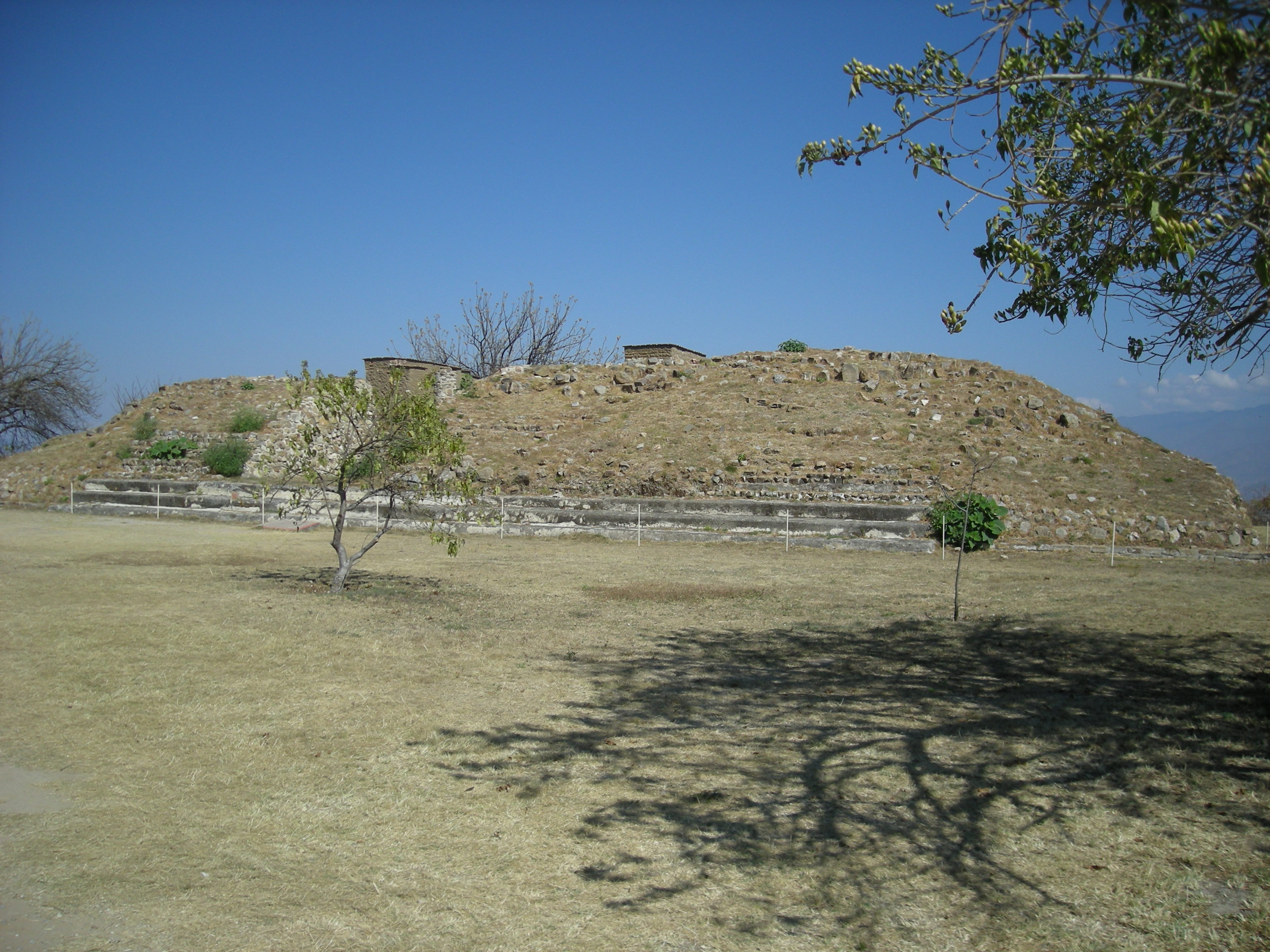
Building X on North Platform

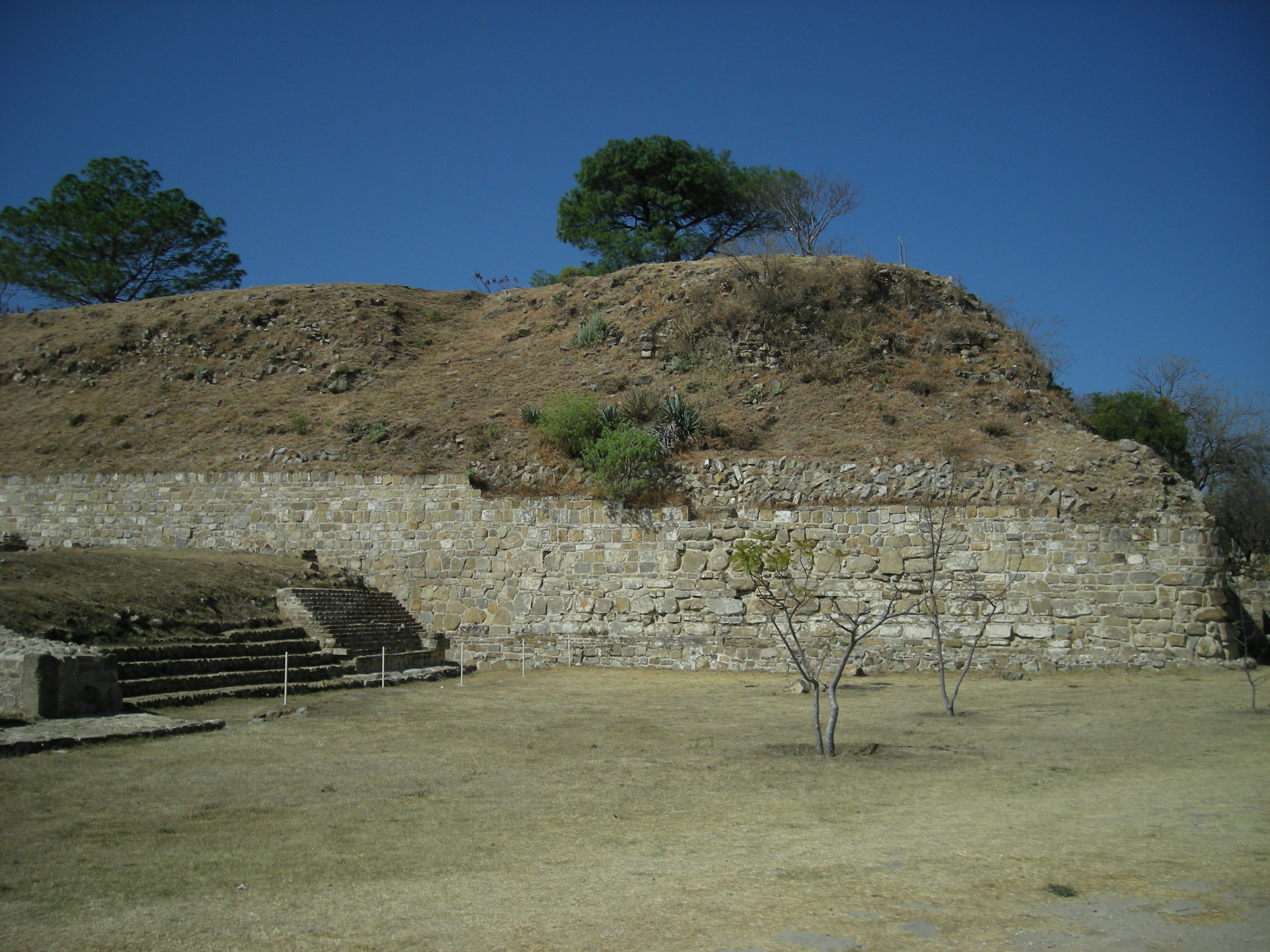
Unexcavated building on North Platform

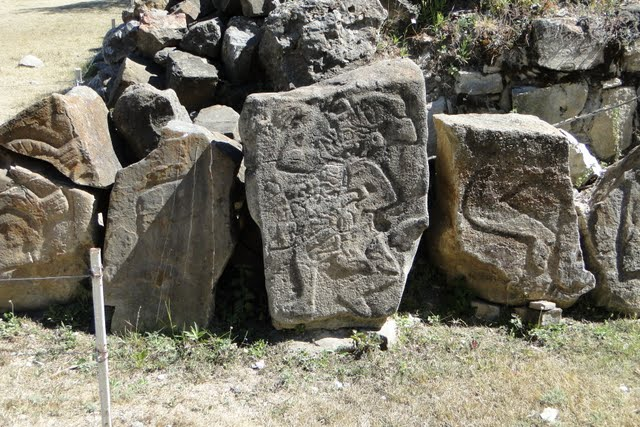
Stone carvings, L

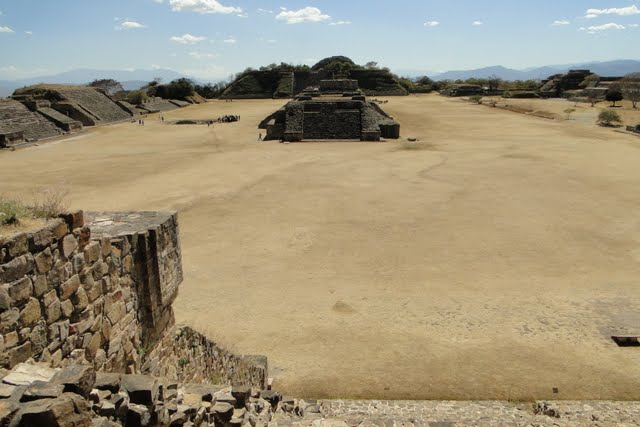
View of Main Plaza from the North Platform

== See also ==
- San José Mogote, an earlier site and predecessor of Monte Albán in the Valley of Oaxaca
- List of archaeoastronomical sites sorted by country
