= Kent Flannery =

North American archaeologist

Kent V. Flannery
- Born: 1934 (age 91–92)
- Occupation: Archaeologist
- Known for: Broad Spectrum Revolution
- Spouse: Joyce Marcus
- Parent: Vaughn Flannery

Academic background
- Education: University of Chicago
- Doctoral advisor: Robert John Braidwood

Academic work
- Discipline: Archaeologist and anthropologist
- Sub-discipline: Pre-Columbian era; Mesoamerica; origins of agriculture; sedentism; cultural evolution; zooarchaeology
- Institutions: University of Michigan
- Notable students: Susan H. Lees, Robert Drennan, Charles S. Spencer

Kent Vaughn Flannery (born 1934) is an American archaeologist who has conducted and published extensive research on the pre-Columbian cultures and civilizations of Mesoamerica, and in particular those of central and southern Mexico. He has also worked in Iran and Peru.

Flannery grew up in Maryland on a farm near the Susquehanna River, and attended the Gilman School in Baltimore. His father was artist Vaughn Flannery. He entered the University of Chicago after his sophomore year of high school, and gained his B.A. degree in zoology in 1954. He began studying for an M.A. in zoology, but shifted to Anthropology following fieldwork in Mexico; he then excavated in Iran with Robert Braidwood in 1960. His 1961 M.A. differentiated wild and domestic pigs in Near Eastern Neolithic sites. His 1964 Ph.D. examined the Tehuacán formative.

Flannery is known for proposing the Broad Spectrum Revolution in 1961. In the 1960s and 70s, Flannery was a leading proponent of Processual Archaeology and the use of Systems Theory in archaeology. He has published influential work on origins of agriculture and village life in the Near east, pastoralists in the Andes, and cultural evolution, and many critiques of modern trends in archaeological method, theory, and practice. From 1966 to 1980 he directed project "Prehistory and Human Ecology of the Valley of Oaxaca, Mexico," dealing with the origins of agriculture, village life, and social inequality in Mexico.

At the University of Michigan, Flannery is the James B. Griffin Professor in the Department of Anthropology and the Curator of Human Ecology and Archaeobiology at the Museum of Anthropological Archaeology. He has chaired thirteen doctoral dissertation committees. His students include Robert Drennan, Susan H. Lees, and Charles S. Spencer.

Flannery was elected to the National Academy of Sciences in 1978, the American Academy of Arts and Sciences in 1996, and the American Philosophical Society in 2005. He was awarded an honorary doctorate by the University of Pennsylvania in 1987, and in 1992 his scholarship was recognized by the American Anthropological Association with the Alfred Vincent Kidder Award for Eminence in the Field of American Archaeology.

In 1973 Flannery married fellow archaeologist and frequent collaborator Joyce Marcus.

== Major publications ==
- Flannery, Kent V. (1972) The Cultural Evolution of Civilizations. Annual Review of Ecology and Systematics 3:399-426.
- Flannery, Kent V. (editor) (1976) The Early Mesoamerican Village. Academic Press, New York.
- Flannery, Kent V. (1985) Guila Naquitz: Archaic Foraging and Early Agriculture in Oaxaca, Mexico. Academic Press, New York.
- Flannery, Kent V. (2006) On the Resilience of Anthropological Archaeology. Annual Review of Anthropology 35:1-13.
- Flannery, Kent V. and Joyce Marcus (editors) (1983) The Cloud People: Divergent Evolution of the Zapotec and Mixtec Civilizations. Academic Press, New York.
- Flannery, Kent V. and Joyce Marcus (1994) Early Formative Pottery in the Valley of Oaxaca. Memoirs vol. 27. Museum of Anthropology, University of Michigan, Ann Arbor.
- Flannery, Kent V. and Joyce Marcus (2005) Excavations at San José Mogote 1: The Household Archaeology. Memoirs vol. 40. Museum of Anthropology, University of Michigan, Ann Arbor.
- Hole, Frank/Flannery, Kent V./Neely, James A.(1969) Prehistory and human ecology of the Deh Luran plain. An early village sequence from Khuzistan, Iran. Memoirs of the Museum of Anthropology, University of Michigan 1. Ann Arbor.
- Marcus, Joyce and Kent V. Flannery (1996) Zapotec Civilization: How Urban Society Evolved in Mexico's Oaxaca Valley. Thames and Hudson, New York.
- Flannery, Kent V. and Joyce Marcus (2012) The Creation of Inequality: How Our Prehistoric Ancestors Set the Stage for Monarchy, Slavery, and Empire. Harvard University Press, Cambridge, MA.

== Fiction ==
- Flannery, Kent V. "The Golden Marshalltown: A Parable for the Archeology of the 1980s." American Anthropologist, New Series, Vol. 84, No. 2 (Jun., 1982)
