= Elsa Redmond =

American archaeologist

Elsa Marion Redmond
- Born: Caracas
- Education: Rice University (BS); Yale University (PhD)
- Scientific career
- Fields: Archaeology
- Workplaces: University of Connecticut; American Museum of Natural History
- Thesis: A fuego y sangre : early Zapotec imperialism in the Cuicatlán Cañada, Oaxaca (1983)

Elsa Marion Redmond is an American archaeologist at the American Museum of Natural History. She specializes in Latin American archaeology. She is an elected member of the National Academy of Sciences and the American Academy of Arts and Sciences.

== Early life and education ==
Redmond was born Caracas and grew up in Venezuela. She attended the Madeira School. Her father, W. Parker Redmond, had studied at Rice University. Redmond began her undergraduate studies at Vassar College, before transferring to Rice University, where she earned a bachelor's degree in 1973. During her undergraduate studies, Redmond completed a summer placement mapping Monte Albán with Richard Blanton. Redmond completed her graduate work at Yale University, where she earned an M.Phil and Ph.D. in 1981. Following her doctoral training, Redmond began researching the formation and evolution of societies in the Oaxaca Valley and Venezuela. Her doctorate considered the hypothesis proposed in inscriptions at Monte Albán, which indicate that the Zapotec people conquered the Cuicatlán Cañada.

== Research and career ==
Redmond was appointed to the University of Connecticut in 1981. Her area of research interest focuses on the role of warfare in the emergence of centralized, hierarchical societies in Mesoamerica, and in particular, the role of conquest warfare in the formation of the Zapotec civilization. She began to work on the Oaxaca Valley with Charles S. Spencer. Over the course of more than three decades of extensive fieldwork in Mexico and Venezuela, Redmond has encountered Africanized bees, venomous snakes and quicksand.

In 1991, Redmond joined the American Museum of Natural History. At the American Museum of Natural History, Redmond is Research Associate in the Division of Anthropology. She has investigated the town of San Martín Tilcajete, mapping the land and excavating mounds and public buildings. On El Palenque, an overgrown hillside site, Redmond excavated a complex of stone foundations with indications of houses. She directed a team of graduate students and local workers in excavating the site. In 2017, Redmond uncovered a palatial compound in El Palenque's plaza in Oaxaca Valley. Redmond used radiocarbon dating to identify the age of the palace complex. The palace, which is similar to others in the Mesoamerican states, is between 2,100 and 2,300 years old. Redmond argued that it may be evidence of one of the earliest governments in the Americas.

=== Awards and honors ===
Redmond's leadership in the field of Mesoamerican Archaeology has led to her election to the following scholarly academies:

- 2007 Elected to the American Academy of Arts and Sciences
- 2014 Elected to the National Academy of Sciences

=== Books ===
- Redmond, Elsa (1998). Chiefdoms and chieftaincy in the Americas. University Press of Florida. ISBN 9780813016207.
- Redmond, Elsa (1994). Tribal and Chiefly Warfare in South America. Ann Arbor: Museum of Anthropology. ISBN 978-0-915703-91-3.
- Redmond, Elsa (1993). A Fuego y Sangre: Early Zapotec Imperialism in the Cuicatlán Cañada, Oaxaca. Ann Arbor: Museum of Anthropology. ISBN 978-0-932206-97-8.

== Personal life ==
Redmond is married to Archaeologist Charles S. Spencer. They reside in the Connecticut suburbs of New York City.
