= Broad spectrum revolution =

Hypothesized increase in dietary range during the Neolithic Revolution

The broad spectrum revolution (BSR) hypothesis, proposed by Kent Flannery in a 1968 paper presented to a London University symposium, suggested that the emergence of the Neolithic in southwest Asia was prefaced by increases in dietary breadth among foraging societies. The broad spectrum revolution followed the last glacial period around 15,000 BP in the Middle East and 12,000 BP in Europe. During this time, there was a transition from focusing on a few main food sources to gathering/hunting a "broad spectrum" of plants and animals.

== Hypothesis details ==
Flannery's hypothesis was meant to help explain the adoption of agriculture in the Neolithic Revolution. Unpersuaded by "the facile explanation of prehistoric environmental change" Flannery suggested (following Lewis Binford's equilibrium model) that population growth in optimal habitats led to demographic pressure within nearby marginal habitats as daughter groups migrated. The search for more food within these marginal habitats forced foragers to diversify the types of food sources harvested, broadening the subsistence base outward to include more fish, small game, waterfowl, invertebrates (such as snails and shellfish), as well as previously ignored or marginal plant sources. Most importantly, Flannery argues that the need for more food in these marginal environments led to the deliberate cultivation of certain plant species, especially cereals. In optimal habitats, these plants naturally grew in relatively dense stands, but required human intervention in order to be efficiently harvested in marginal zones. Thus, the broad spectrum revolution set the stage for domestication and rise of permanent agricultural settlement.

=== Characteristics ===
A BSR is likely to manifest as both an increased spectrum of food resources and an evenness in the exploitation of high- and low-value prey. Under a broad spectrum economy a greater amount of low-value prey (i.e. high cost-to-benefit ratio) would be included because there are insufficient high-value prey to reliably satisfy a population's needs. In terms of plants, it would be expected that foodstuffs that had once been ignored because of difficulty of extraction were now included in a diet. In terms of fauna, animal prey which was previously considered an inefficient use of resources (particularly small, fast mammals or fish) could now also be worthwhile. In other words, increasing scarcity made the extra effort necessary for survival.

In the Middle East, the broad spectrum revolution led to an increase in the production of food. The growth and reproduction of certain plants and animals became vastly popular. Because large animals became quite scarce, people had to find new resources of food and tools elsewhere. Interests focused on smaller game like fish, rabbits, and shellfish because the reproduction rate of small animals is much greater than that of large animals.

=== Stimulation ===
The most commonly accepted stimulation for the BSR is demographic pressures on the landscape, under which over-exploitation of resources meant narrow diets restricted to high-value prey could no longer feed the expanding population.

The broad-spectrum revolution has also been linked to climatic changes, including sea level rises during which:

1. Conditions became more inviting to marine life offshore in shallow, warm waters.
2. Quantity and variety of marine life increased drastically as did the number of edible species.
3. Because the rivers' power weakened with rising waters, the currents flowing into the ocean were slow enough to allow salmon and other fish to ascend upstream to spawn.
4. Birds found refuge next to riverbeds in marsh grasses and then proceeded to migrate across Europe in the wintertime.

== Example ==
The Japanese site Nittano (inlet near Tokyo) was occupied several times between 6000 and 5000 BP. The Jōmon culture occupied Nittano at over 30,000 sites known in Japan. People hunted deer, pigs, bears, antelope, fish, shellfish, and gathered plants. Sites have yielded over 300 sample remains of shellfish and 180 sample remains of plants.

== Criticism ==
The broad spectrum revolution has been a subject of intense debate since it was first proposed, but its basic arguments are well-supported.
