= Cocijo =

Pre-Columbian Zapotec deity

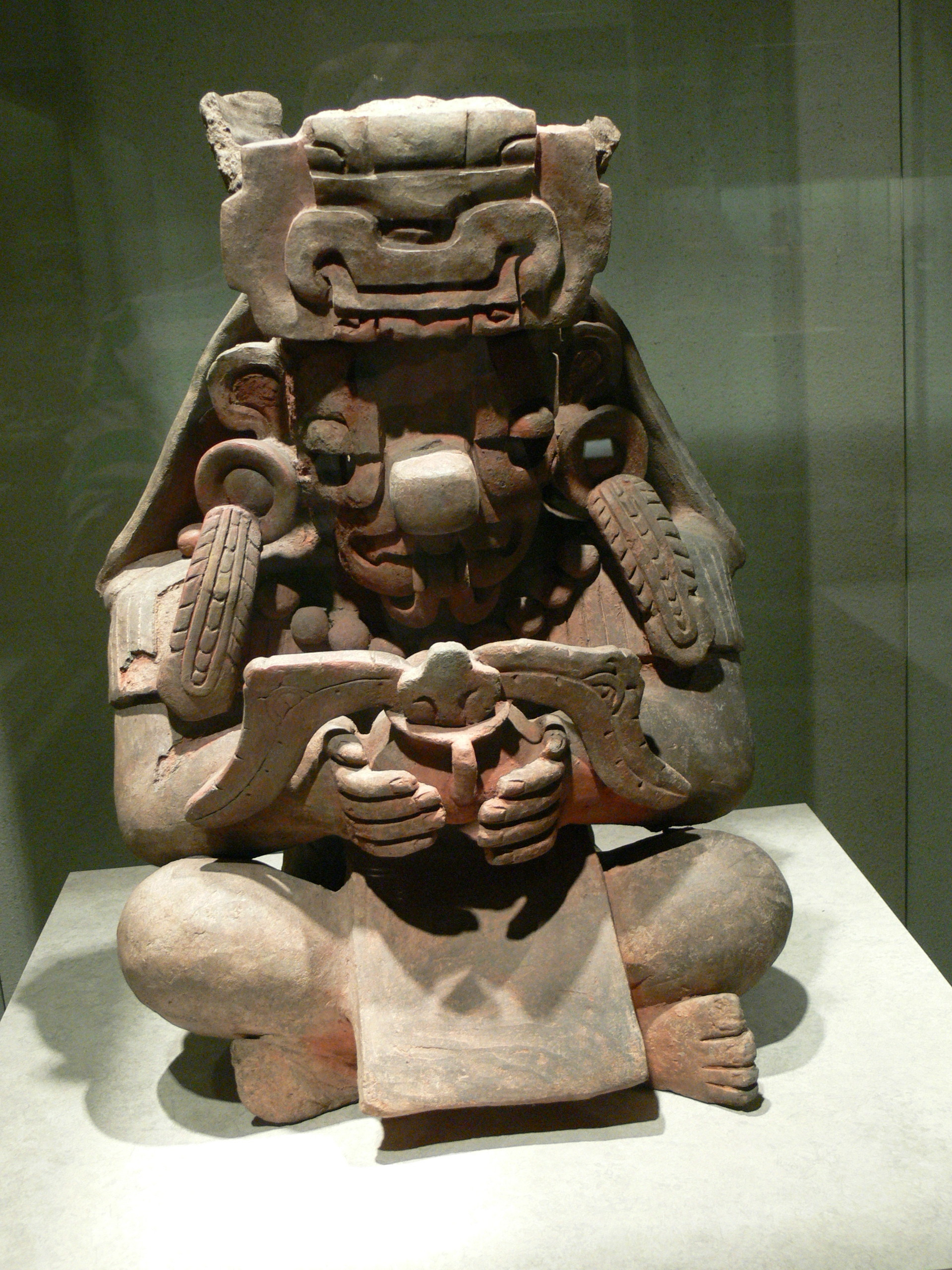
An Early Classic representation of Cocijo found at Monte Albán and now in the Museo Nacional de Antropología in Mexico City.

Cocijo (Zapotec: Cocijo [kosijo]; occasionally spelt Cociyo, otherwise known as Guziu in the Zapotec language) is a lightning deity of the pre-Columbian Zapotec civilization of southern Mexico. He has attributes characteristic of similar Mesoamerican deities associated with rain, thunder and lightning, such as Tlaloc of central Mexico, and Chaac (or Chaak) of the Maya civilization. In the Zapotec language, the word cocijo means "lightning", as well as referring to the deity.

Cocijo was the most important deity among the pre-Columbian Zapotecs because of his association with rainfall. He is commonly represented on ceramics from the Zapotec area, from the Middle Preclassic right through to the Terminal Classic. Cocijo was said to be the great lightning god and creator of the world. In Zapotec myth, he made the sun, moon, stars, seasons, land, mountains, rivers, plants and animals, and day and night by exhaling and creating everything from his breath.

== Appearance ==
In Zapotec art Cocijo is represented with a zoomorphic face with a wide, blunt snout and a long forked serpentine tongue. Cocijo often bears the Zapotec glyph C in his headdress. A similar glyph is used in Mixtec codices as the day sign Water and it is likely that its meaning in Zapotec is identical, therefore being the appropriate glyph for the rain and storm god.

Representations of Cocijo combine elements earth-jaguar and sky-serpent, which are associated with fertility. His eyebrows depict the heavens, his lower lids represent clouds, and his forked serpent's tongue represents a bolt of lightning.

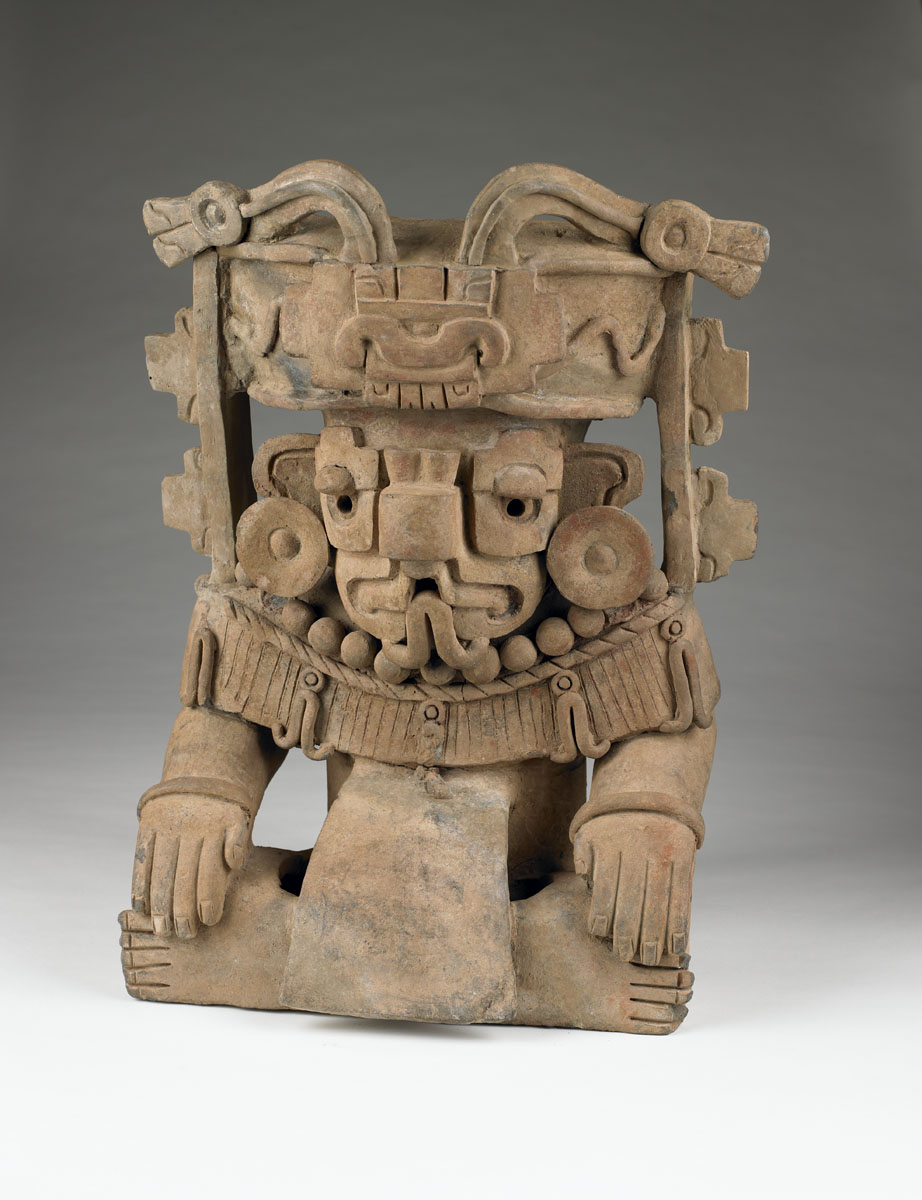
Urn representing Cocijo held at the Birmingham Museum of Art.

== Classic Period ==
At the Late Classic Zapotec archaeological site of Lambityeco in Oaxaca, the stucco busts of Cocijo are depicted holding a jar spilling water in one hand and bolts of lightning in the other. During the Classic Period the jaguar was associated, at least partly, with Cocijo.

== Postclassic Period ==
Among the Zapotecs of the Postclassic period, the four 65-day divisions of the 260-day calendar were named cocijos, which implies that there was a different Cocijo associated with each cardinal direction. Religious rites, including bloodletting, were performed to each of these four Cocijos. As payment for bringing rain Cocijo frequently received human sacrifice, mostly in the form of children but also, less frequently, adults.

== Colonial Period ==
The worship of Cocijo continued into early Colonial times. In the late 1540s, three community leaders of Yanhuitlán were accused of making sacrifices to the deity, including human sacrifices, by the inhabitants of hostile neighbouring villages and were tried by the inquisitor Francisco Tello de Sandoval.
