= Vaughn Flannery =

American painter

- Born: October 6, 1898; Louisville, Kentucky, United States
- Died: December 25, 1955 (aged 57); Philadelphia, Pennsylvania, United States
- Occupation: Painter

Vaughn Flannery (October 6, 1898 – December 25, 1955) was an American painter. His artwork was included in the painting event of the art competition at the 1932 Summer Olympics.
