= Charles S. Spencer =

American curator, researcher, and anthropologist (born 1950)

Charles Sidney Spencer
- Born: June 12, 1950; Panama Canal Zone
- Education: Rice University, University of Michigan
- Employer: American Museum of Natural History

Charles Sidney Spencer (born 12 June 1950) is an American curator, researcher, and anthropologist. He serves as the Curator of Mexican and Central American Archaeology in the Division of Anthropology at the American Museum of Natural History in New York City. He has over 110 publications to date, including books, chapters, and articles.

== Biography ==
Charles Sidney Spencer was born on 12 June 1950 in Ancon, Panama, which was then part of the Panama Canal Zone. He attended local U.S.-operated schools in the Canal Zone before leaving Panama to attend Rice University, where he received his BA degree in anthropology in 1972.

He completed his graduate training at the University of Michigan, where he received his Ph.D. in Anthropology in 1981. His dissertation, "The Cuicatlán Cañada and Monte Albán: Interregional Processes and Primary State Formation in Central Oaxaca," was published in 1982 by Academic Press.

Since the 1970s, Spencer has conducted extensive archaeological fieldwork in Mexico and Venezuela. He has trained a generation of graduate students in methodologies of field research, and he also has served on doctoral committees as primary advisor and as a reader. Prior to his appointment at the AMNH in 1991, Spencer was associate professor of anthropology at the University of Connecticut.

In 2007, Spencer was elected to membership in the National Academy of Sciences, one of the highest honors a scientist can receive from a U.S.-based organization. At his induction ceremony in April 2008, NAS President Ralph Cicerone lauded Spencer as "the leading evolutionary archaeologist of his generation." The citation continues: "His fieldwork has documented the rise of entrepreneurial rank societies, the origin of the stratified militaristic state, and the strategies of imperial colonization. His work combines empirical data with evolutionary concepts like tempo, mode, biased transmission, and adaptive peaks."

Spencer is also a Fellow of the American Academy of Arts and Sciences, along with his wife and research collaborator, Elsa M. Redmond. They reside in the Connecticut suburbs of New York City.
