= Joseph Whitecotton =

American academic (born 1937)

Joseph W. Whitecotton (born September 11, 1937) is an American academic anthropologist and ethnohistorian, a specialist in Latin American cultural anthropology and in particular of Mesoamerican cultures. His primary research focus has been on the Zapotec civilization of central Mexico and Oaxaca, and he is the author of half a dozen monographs on the subject. In addition to his research on the Zapotec, Whitecotton has made contributions in historical ethnography, the study of political economies and the effects of globalization trends on local cultures. He has also investigated evidence for pre-Columbian contacts and trade between Mesoamerica and cultures in the American Southwest, and conducted ethnographical research of the Hispanos in New Mexico. Whitecotton is also a performing jazz musician and has written on the influences of jazz in popular culture.

The majority of Whitecotton's academic career has been associated with the University of Oklahoma (OU), where he lectured in various positions from 1967 until his official retirement in 1999. Since then he has retained a position at OU as Professor Emeritus of Anthropology and Liberal Studies, and continued to be active in research publications and conferences.

== Studies and academic career ==
Joseph Whitecotton's undergraduate studies were undertaken at University of Miami, Florida, from where he obtained a B.A. in 1959. Whitecotton continued postgraduate studies at Mexico City College, Mexico City (1959–1960) and the University of Massachusetts Amherst (1961). He completed his doctorate studies in anthropology at University of Illinois at Urbana-Champaign (UIUC), and was awarded his PhD from that institution in 1968. While studying for his doctorate Whitecotton taught as a teaching assistant at UIUC, and as an instructor in anthropology at Lawrence University in Appleton, Wisconsin.

Whitecotton gained a position at the University of Oklahoma in 1967, initially as assistant professor in anthropology. He would remain associated with OU for the remainder of his academic career, in both teaching and administrative positions including as chair of the Anthropology Department (1969–1972), associate professor (1971–1980) and full professor (1980 until his retirement). Whitecotton also served as curator and consultant in ethnohistory at the Oklahoma Museum of Natural History and OU's Stovall Museum. After his formal retirement in 1999 Whitecotton spent two academic years (2003 and 2005) as a visiting professor in anthropology at North Carolina's Wake Forest University.
