= Robert Drennan =

American archaeologist

Robert D. Drennan (1948-2025) was an archaeologist who specialized in the development of sociopolitical complexity of prehistoric societies. He carried out fieldwork in Mexico, Colombia, and China.

He received his Ph.D. in 1975 from the University of Michigan, and became Assistant Professor at the Department of Anthropology of the University of Pittsburgh in 1977. In 2004 was admitted into the United States National Academy of Sciences. He retired as a Distinguished Professor in May 2022.
