= Robert N. Zeitlin =

Robert Norman Zeitlin (born 1935) is an American professor emeritus of anthropology at Brandeis University. He has a B.A. in psychology from Cornell University, a B.S. in aeronautical engineering from Boston University, an M.A. in anthropology from City University of New York, and a M.Phil. and Ph.D. in anthropology from Yale University.

Zeitlin is a specialist and well-regarded expert in the archaeology of Mexico and Central AmericaMesoamerica, in particular of the Zapotec and other cultures of pre-Columbian Oaxaca and the Isthmus of Tehuantepec, as well as on the political economies of ancient societies in general. Originally educated as an aeronautical engineer his interests turned to anthropology and archaeology after a stint as a naval officer and subsequent travel in Southeast Asia. He is married to Judith Francis Zeitlin, Professor Emeritus of Anthropology at the University of Massachusetts, Boston. They have two children, Andrew Forrest Zeitlin, an Assistant Professor of Economics at Georgetown University, and Jeremy Edward Zeitlin, a graduate student in Creative Writing at Emerson College.

== Publications ==
- 2015 "The Palatial Residence on Mound 9" In Prehistory and Human Ecology of the Valley of Oaxaca, Vol. 16, Excavations at San Jose Mogote 2: The Cognitive Archaeology, edited by Kent V. Flannery and Joyce Marcus (second author with J.F. Zeitlin). Memoirs of the Museum of Anthropology, University of Michigan, No. 58.
- 2007 "Early Cultures of Middle America." In Encyclopedia of Archaeology, edited by D. Pearsall. Elsevier, Ltd., Oxford, U.K., pp 162–82.
- 2007 Review of Intermediate Elites in Pre-Columbian States and Empires, edited by C.M. Elson and R. A. Covey. American Anthropologist. Vol 109(2):375-76.
- 2001 "Nécrologies: Richard Stockton MacNeish, April 29, 1918-January 16, 2001. Journal de la Société des Américanistes. Musée de L'Homme, Paris pp. 115-118.
- 2001 "The Isthmus of Tehuantepec" In The Oxford Encyclopedia of Mesoamerican Cultures, The Civilizations of Mexico and Central America, Vol. 3, pp. 190–93. Oxford University Press, New York.
- 2001 "Zapotec: Pre-Hispanic and Colonial Periods" In The Oxford Encyclopedia of Mesoamerican Cultures, The Civilizations of Mexico and Central America, Vol. 3 (first author, with J.F. Zeitlin), pp 371–75. Oxford University Press, New York.
- 2001 "Oaxaca and Tehuantepec Regions" In The Archaeology of Ancient Mexico and Central America: An Encyclopedia, edited by S.T. Evans and D.L. Webster. Garland Publishing, New York., pp. 537–46.
- 2001 "Laguna Zope" In The Archaeology of Ancient Mexico and Central America: An Encyclopedia, edited by S.T. Evans and D.L. Webster. Garland Publishing, New York, pp. 393–94.
- 2000 "On Oaxaca Coast Archaeology: Setting the Record Straight". Current Anthropology, Vol. 41(4):623-25 (second author, with Arthur A. Joyce, Judith Francis Zeitlin, and Javier Urcid).
- 2000 "The Paleoindian and Archaic Cultures of Mesoamerica" (first author, with J.F. Zeitlin). The Cambridge History of the Native Peoples of the Americas, Vol. II, Mesoamerica, Part 1, Ch. 2, edited by R.E.W. Adams and M.J. MacLeod. Cambridge University Press, Cambridge, England, pp. 45–121.
- 2000 "Two Perspectives on the Rise of Civilization in Mesoamerica's Oaxaca Valley." Book Review Essay. Latin American Antiquity 11(1): 87–89.
- 1999 "The Zapotec Imperialism Argument: Insights from the Oaxaca Coast" (first author, with A.A. Joyce) Current Anthropology, Vol. 40(3):383-92.
- 1996a "Explaining Civilization" Review of Zapotec Civilization. How Urban Society Evolved in Mexico's Oaxaca Valley, by J. Marcus and K.V. Flannery. Science, Vol. 273:1178-1179.
- 1996b "Comments on 'Agency, Ideology, and Power: Models in Archaeology'." Current Anthropology, Vol. 37(1):64-65.
- 1995 Reviews of Ancient Mesoamerica. A Comparison of Change in Three Regions, 2nd edition, by R.E. Blanton, S.A. Kowalewski, G.M. Feinman, and L.M. Finsten and The Aztecs, Maya, and their Predecessors. Archaeology of Mesoamerica, 3rd edition, by M.P. Weaver. American Antiquity 60(2):385-88.
- 1995 "El postclasico tardio en el Istmo de Tehuantepec" (second author with J.F. Zeitlin) Revista Dáani Béedxe, No. 16, pp. 7–8. Mexico.
- 1995 "Grupos etnicos y linguisticos del postclasico tardio en el sur del istmo" (second author, with J.F. Zeitlin). Revista Dáani Béedxe, No. 17, pp. 7–10. Mexico.
- 1994 "Accounting for the Prehistoric Long-Distance Movement of Goods with a Measure of Style." Special Issue on "Communication and Language." World Archaeology 26(2):208-34.
- 1993a "Pacific Coastal Laguna Zope: A Regional Center in the Terminal Formative Hinterlands of Monte Albán." Ancient Mesoamerica 4:85-101. Cambridge University Press, Cambridge, England.
- 1993b "Pottery Far From Home." Faces. Vol. IX. American Museum of Natural History, New York.
- 1991a "The Energetics of Trade and Market in the Early Empires of Mesoamerica." In Research in Economic Anthropology, Vol. 13, pp. 373–86, edited by B.L. Isaac. JAI Press, Greenwich, CT.
- 1991b "La arqueología de interacción de Monte Albán con el istmo meridional de Tehuantepec en el periodo formativo tardío." Boletín (1990), pp. 278–82. Consejo de Arqueología, Instituto Nacional de Antropología e Historia, Mexico.
- 1990a "The Isthmus and the Valley of Oaxaca. Questions about Zapotec Imperialism in the Pacific Lowlands of Mesoamerica." American Antiquity 55(2):250-61.
- 1990b "Documenting the Argument for a Scientific Approach to Archaeological Inference" Review article of Archaeology and the Methodology of Science by J. Kelley and M.P. Hanen. Current Anthropology 11:472-74.
- 1990c "Arqueología y época prehispanica en el sur del istmo de Tehuantepec (with J.F. Zeitlin). Lecturas históricas del estado de Oaxaca. Vol. 1, Epoca prehispánica, edited by M.C. Winter, pp. 393-454. Instituto Nacional de Antropología e Historia, Mexico.
- 1989 Review of "Preclassic Maya Pottery at Cuello, Belize," by Laura J. Kosakowsky. The Latin American Anthropology Review 1(1):17-18.
- 1988 "An Ancient Sacred Center" Review of Ancient Chalcatzingo, by David C. Grove. Science 241:103-104.
- 1987a "Comments" on Earle, T. and R.W. Preucel, 'Processual Archaeology and the Radical Critique.' Current Anthropology 28(4):524-25.
- 1987b "Bridges over Troubled Waters." Review of Ripples in the Chichimec Sea. New Considerations of Southwestern-Mesoamerican Interactions, edited by R.J. Mathien and R.H. McGuire. The Kiva. Quarterly Journal of the Arizona Archaeological and Historical Society. Vol. 53(1):59-65.
- 1986 "A Sociocultural Perspective on the Spatial Analysis of Commodity and Stylistic Distributions." In The Human Uses of Flint and Chert, edited by G. de G. Sieveking and M.H. Newcomer, Ch. 21, pp. 173–81. Cambridge University Press, Cambridge, England.
- 1985 Review of Mining and Mining Techniques in Ancient Mesoamerica, ed. by P. Weigand and G. Gwynne. American Antiquity 50(4):929-30.
- 1984a "A Summary Report on Three Seasons of Field Investigations into the Archaic Period Prehistory of Belize." American Antiquity 86:358-69.
- 1984b Review of Archaeology and Volcanism in Central America. The Zapotitán Valley of El Salvador, edited by P.D. Sheets. Science 226:163-64.
- 1983 Review of The Cuicatlán Cañada and Monte Albán. A Study of Primary State Formation, by C.S. Spencer. American Antiquity 48:646-47.
- 1982 "Toward a More Comprehensive Model of Interregional Commodity Distribution: Political Variables and Prehistoric Obsidian Procurement in Mesoamerica." American Antiquity 47:260-75.
- 1981a "Ben's Mill." In Odyssey Educator's Guide, p. 13. Public Broadcasting Associates, Boston.
- 1981b "Maya Lords of the Jungle" In Odyssey Educator's Guide, p. 16. Public Broadcasting Associates, Boston.
- 1980a "Sociocultural Evolution in Mesoamerica" (first author, with J.F. Zeitlin) Science 207:396-98.
- 1980b "Determinantes políticas y económicas de la variación en los patrones de intercambio de obsidiana en Mesoamérica precolombina." In Rutas de intercambio en Mesoamérica ye el norte de México. Memorias de la XVI Reunión de Mesa Redonda, Saltillo México, Vol. 1, pp. 363–69. Sociedad Mexicana de Antropología, Mexico.
- 1978a "Long-Distance Exchange and the Growth of a Regional Center: An Example from the Southern Isthmus of Tehuantepec, Mexico" In Prehistoric Coastal Adaptations: The Economy and Ecology of Maritime Middle America, edited by B.L. Stark and B. Voorhies, pp. 183–210. Academic Press, New York.
- 1978b "Trace Element Analysis and the Archaeological Study of Obsidian Procurement in Precolumbian Mesoamerica" (first author, with R.C. Heimbuch). In Lithics and Subsistence: The Analysis of Stone Tool Use in Prehistoric Economies, edited by D.D. Davis, pp. 117–59. Vanderbilt University Publications in Anthropology, No. 20.

== Bibliography ==
- (contributor) "The Cambridge History of the Native Peoples of the Americas Volume 2, Mesoamerica (Parts 1 and 2)" Cambridge University Press, 2000
