= Basilica of Nuestra Señora de Soledad =

Church building in Oaxaca de Juárez, Mexico

Basílica de Nuestra Señora de la Soledad
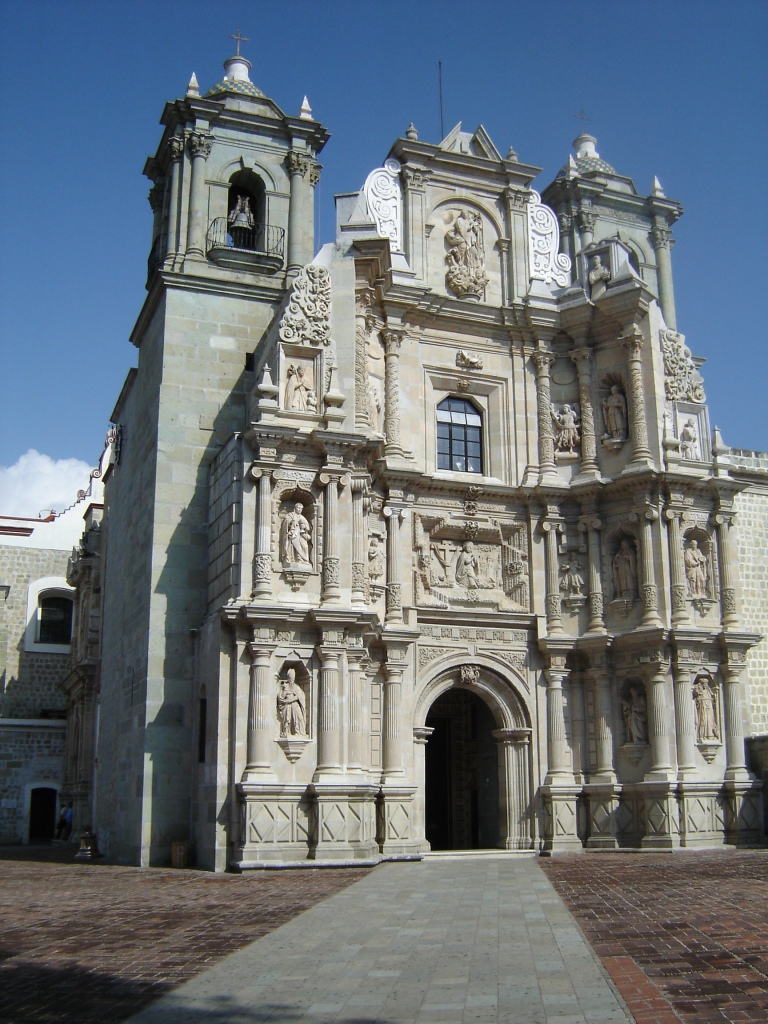
- Facade of the Basílica de Nuestra Señora de la Soledad

Religion
- Affiliation: Roman Catholic
- Province: Archdiocese of Antequera, Oaxaca
- Rite: Latin Rite
- Ecclesiastical or organisational status: Basilica
- Year consecrated: 1690

Location
- Location: (Mexico) Oaxaca de Juárez
- Interactive map of Basílica de Nuestra Señora de la Soledad
- Coordinates: 17°03′49″N 96°43′49″W

Architecture
- Architect: Fernando Méndez
- Type: Latin Cross
- Style: Baroque
- Groundbreaking: 1682
- Completed: 1718

Specifications
- Direction of façade: East-northeast
- Materials: cantera

The Basilica of Nuestra Señora de Soledad (Basilica of Our Lady of Solitude) is a Roman Catholic Basilica located in Oaxaca de Juárez, Oaxaca, Mexico. It was built between 1682 and 1690, and is a sanctuary dedicated to Our Lady of Solitude, patron saint of Oaxaca. The architecture style is Baroque, and was intentionally built with low spires and towers, as to better resist earthquakes. The Basilica de la Soledad is part of the Historic Center of Oaxaca City, which was declared World Heritage Site by UNESCO in 1987.

== History ==
The construction of the Basilica began in 1682 and in 1690 was consecrated by Bishop Sariñana y Cuenca. It was designed by Father Fernando Méndez and the current facade was built between 1717 and 1718, with the assistance of Bishop Angel Maldonado.

== Description ==
The Basilica of La Soledad is laid out in the shape of a Latin cross. The building was constructed from green cantera, a stone common in parts of Oaxaca.

The west gallery contains a baroque pipe organ dated 1686, restored to playing condition in 2000.

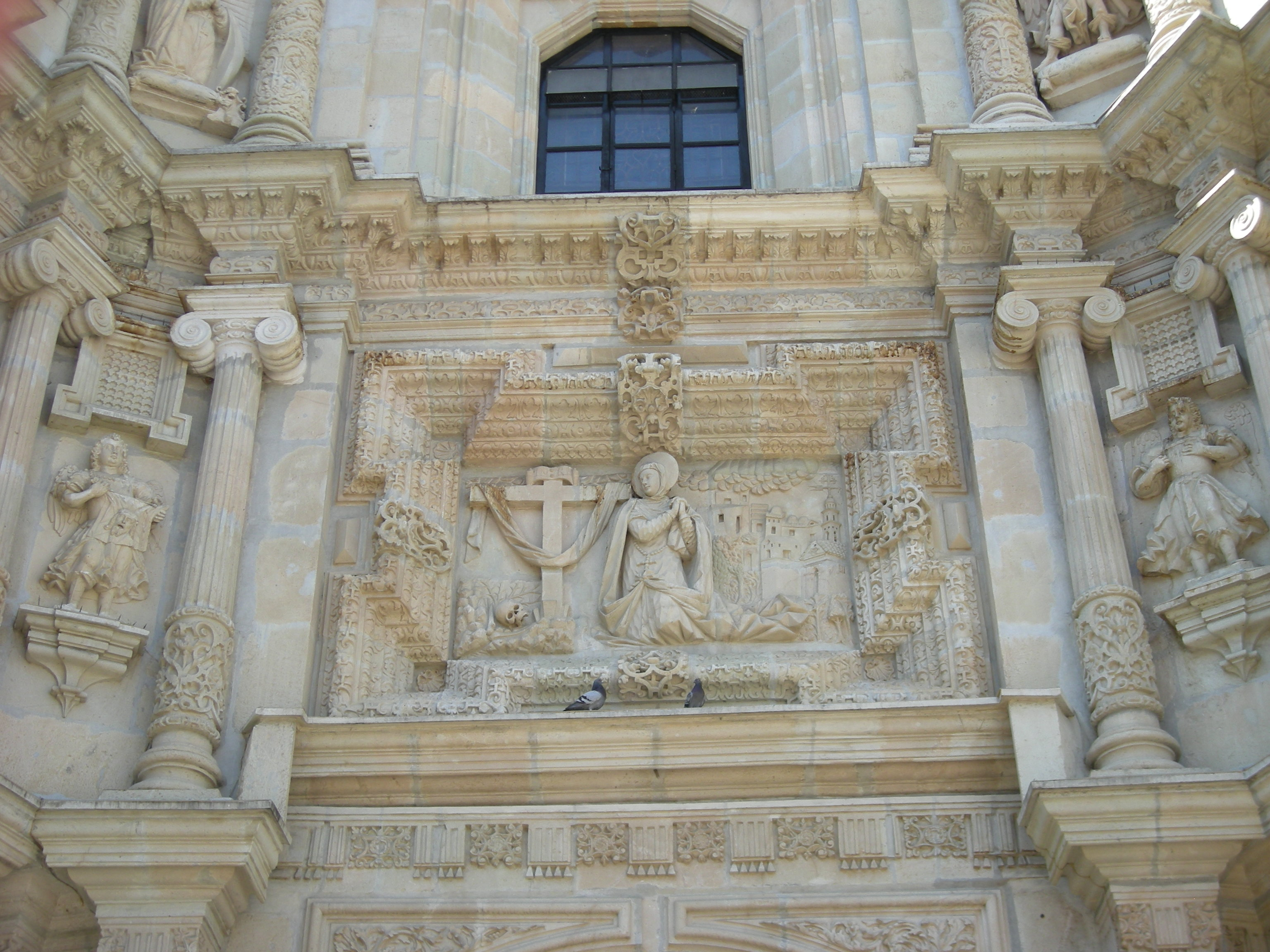
Virgin Mary, kneeling and weeping at the foot of the Cross.

== See also ==
- Templo de Santo Domingo de Guzmán
- Baroque architecture
- Oaxaca de Juárez
