= Oaxaca Cathedral =

Catholic Cathedral in Oaxaca, Mexico

Catedral Metropolitana de Nuestra Señora de la Asunción
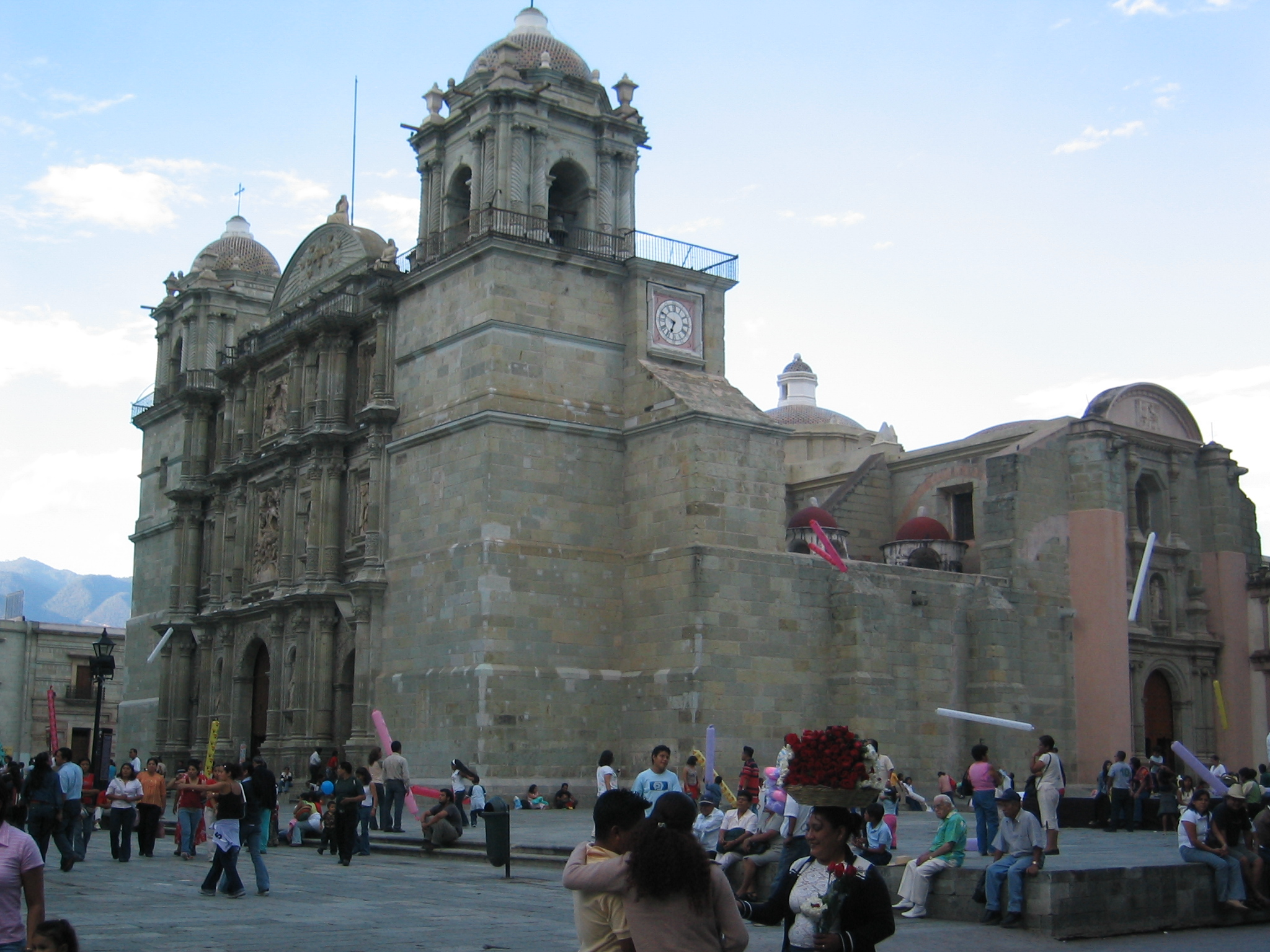
- The front of the Cathedral.

Religion
- Affiliation: Roman Catholic
- Province: Roman Catholic Archdiocese of Antequera, Oaxaca
- Leadership: Archbishop Pedro Vázquez Villalobos
- Year consecrated: 1733
- Status: Cathedral

Location
- Location: Oaxaca de Juarez, Oaxaca, Mexico.
- Interactive map of Catedral Metropolitana de Nuestra Señora de la Asunción
- Coordinates: 17°03′42″N 96°43′32″W

Architecture
- Type: Cathedral
- Style: Baroque
- Groundbreaking: 1573
- Completed: 1733

Specifications
- Direction of façade: South
- Materials: Cantera stone

Website
- web.archive.org/web/20240515001054/http://www.arquioax.org/misericordia/

The Cathedral of Our Lady of the Assumption (Spanish: Catedral Metropolitana de Nuestra Señora de la Asunción), located in the city of Oaxaca de Juarez, Oaxaca, Mexico, is the seat of the Roman Catholic Archdiocese of Antequera, Oaxaca. Its construction began circa 1535 and it was consecrated on 12 July 1733. It is dedicated to Our Lady of the Assumption.

== History ==
Construction began in 1535, during which the Temple of San Juan de Dios temporarily served as the cathedral church of the diocese. In 1640, the cathedral was installed and the seat of the diocese was transferred to Our Lady of the Assumption. Due to earthquakes in the 16th and 18th centuries, the cathedral had to be reconstructed several times, with the most recent reconstruction beginning in 1702 and finishing in 1733.

== Structure ==
Its facade is made of green cantera stone commonly found in Oaxaca's buildings, and the interior is in Neoclassical style. The altar features a statue of Our Lady of the Assumption (Nuestra Señora de la Asunción) which was made in Italy during the Porfirian era, who is represented by a bronze sculpture brought from Europe and made by Tadoini.

The towers of the cathedral are not the originals, as they were destroyed in the 1931 Oaxaca earthquake. In the south wing there is a clock donated to Oaxaca by King Fernando VII The Lord of Lightning is in the last chapel on the left, while the second on the right contains the remains of the Cross of Huatulco. Atop the west wall of the quire is a locally built baroque pipe organ, parts of which date to 1711–1712, restored in 1997.

== Footnotes ==
- Instituto Nacional de Geografía, Estadística e Informática (1993). INEGI (ed.). Estado de Oaxaca. México. Guía turística. ISBN 968-892-304-4.
