= Oaxaca Community Foundation =

Community organization

The Oaxaca Community Foundation (Fundación Comunitaria Oaxaca) is located in the city of Oaxaca de Juarez, in the state of Oaxaca, Mexico. The foundation aims to support marginalized communities in the state of Oaxaca. Through donations and investments totaling nearly US$20 million from 13 foundations, 167 companies, three levels of various government administrations, and more than 700 individuals, the Foundation currently supports 153 projects addressing issues of health, education, gender, cultural identity, income generation, and the environment. The Oaxaca Community Foundation survives solely on grants and donations, and does not operate under an endowment fund. The Foundation has been studied by Harvard University, is an International Youth Foundation partner, and its staff, including director Jaimie Bolaños, has participated in the Synergos Institute Senior Fellows Program, as well as executive committees of The World Bank Community Foundation Initiative, the WINGS Global Fund for Community Foundations, and Council on Foundations.

== Mission statement ==
“To drive social participation, within and beyond Oaxaca, in improving the well-being and quality of life in the most vulnerable and marginalized Oaxacan communities through initiatives that generate fundamental and lasting change.”

== History ==
The Oaxaca Community Foundation was the first community foundation in Latin America. It was established in 1996 as a result of collaboration between local and national business leaders, as well as support from U.S. foundations including: The International Youth Foundation, The W.K. Kellogg Foundation, The Rockefeller Foundation and The John D. and Catherine T. MacArthur Foundation. The founders first met after the 1994 Zapatista armed uprisings in Chiapas to discuss ways in which to address poverty and provide support in Oaxaca, as these uprisings highlighted the struggles of the marginalized communities throughout Mexico.

== Projects ==
=== Productive Projects ===
The Oaxaca Community Foundation's principal focus is the investment in Community Based Enterprises such as eco-tourism, micro-credit groups, coffee, chocolate, and honey producers, as well as in traditional arts and crafts, among others.

=== The Oaxaca Fund Initiative ===
The Oaxaca Fund Initiative is a two-year collaboration between the Oaxaca Community Foundation and International Community Foundation to support key programs in community development, education, nutrition and health. Every dollar raised is matched 1:1 by the Ford Foundation up to a maximum of US$300,000.

=== Youth Education and Employability ===
In collaboration with Microsoft Mexico, municipal governments, and the rural youth education system BIC (Bachillerato Inter Cultural), the Oaxaca Community Foundation has established 6 Community Learning Centers and satellite internet connections in rural areas of Oaxaca since 2005. Each center has 300 users and trains over 150 people per year.

=== Youth Leadership and Volunteerism ===
Through the Youth for Oaxaca Summer Volunteerism Camp, the Oaxaca Community Foundation in collaboration with the Oaxaca Fund for Nature Conservation, invites international, and local university students to spend three weeks in remote indigenous villages to participate in cultural exchanges and to work on community development projects.
