= Oaxaca City =

City in Oaxaca, Mexico

Oaxaca Ndua (Zapotec)
- City
- Oaxaca de Juárez
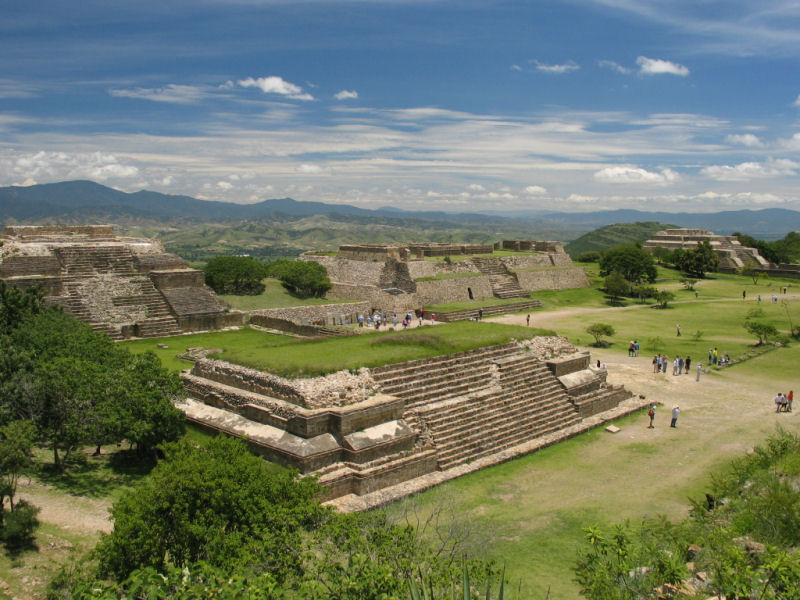
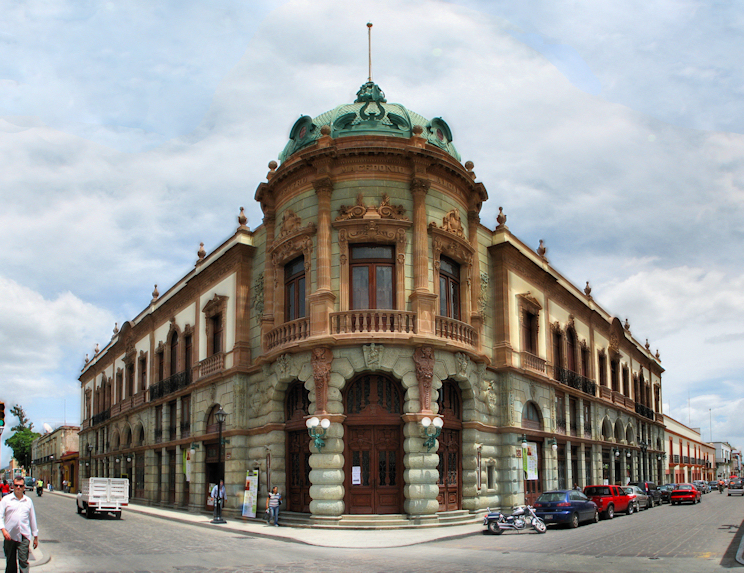
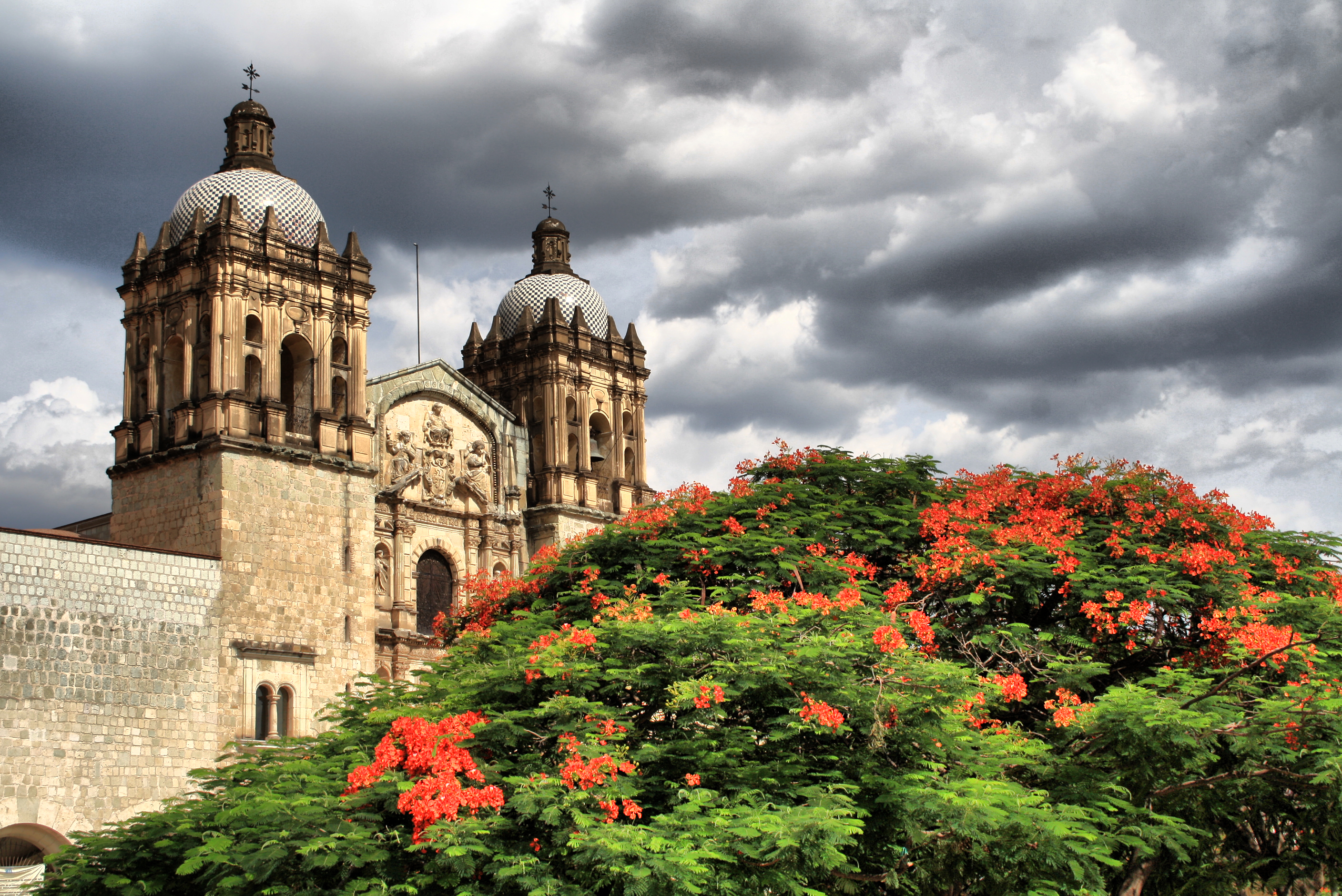
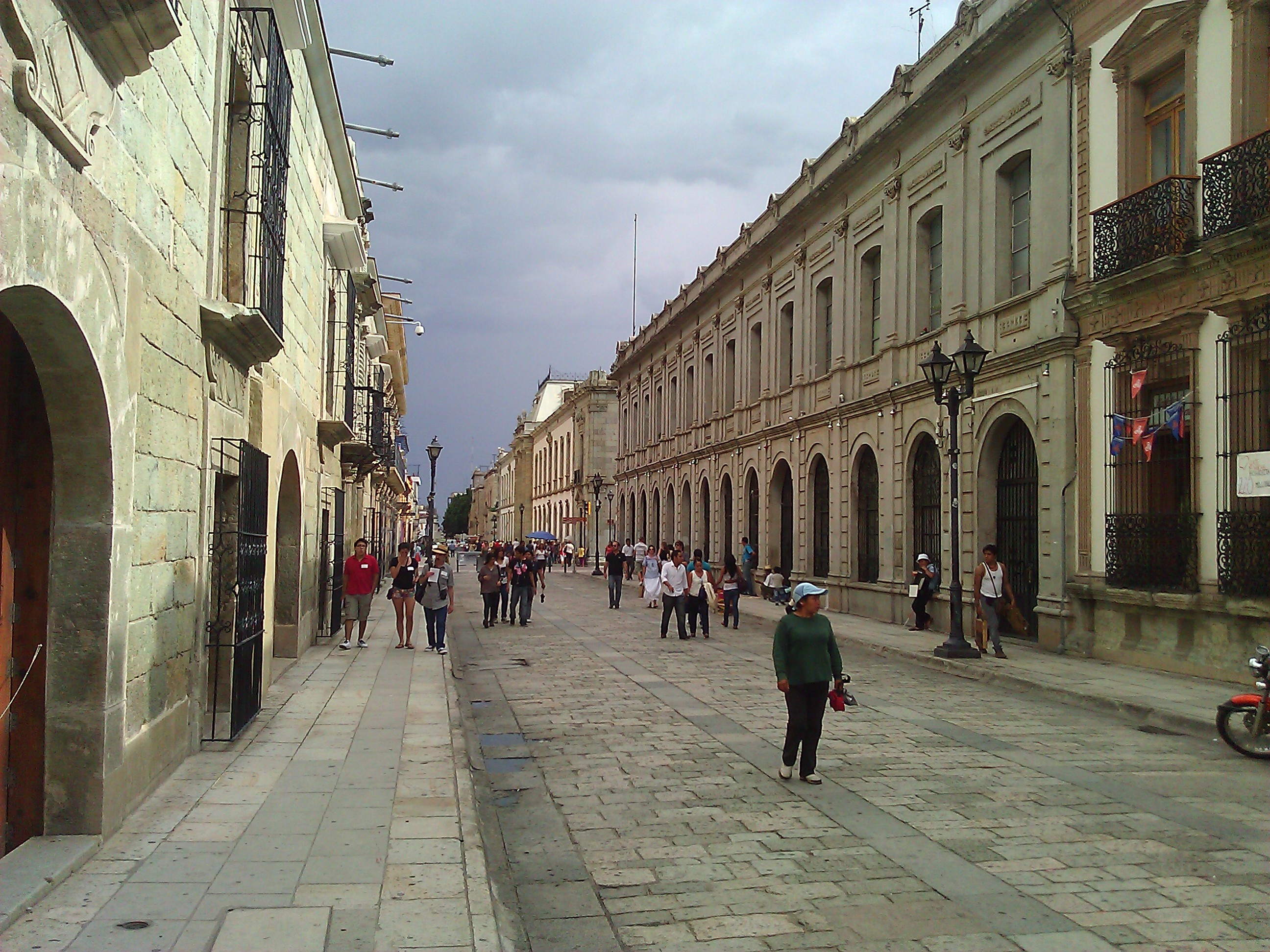
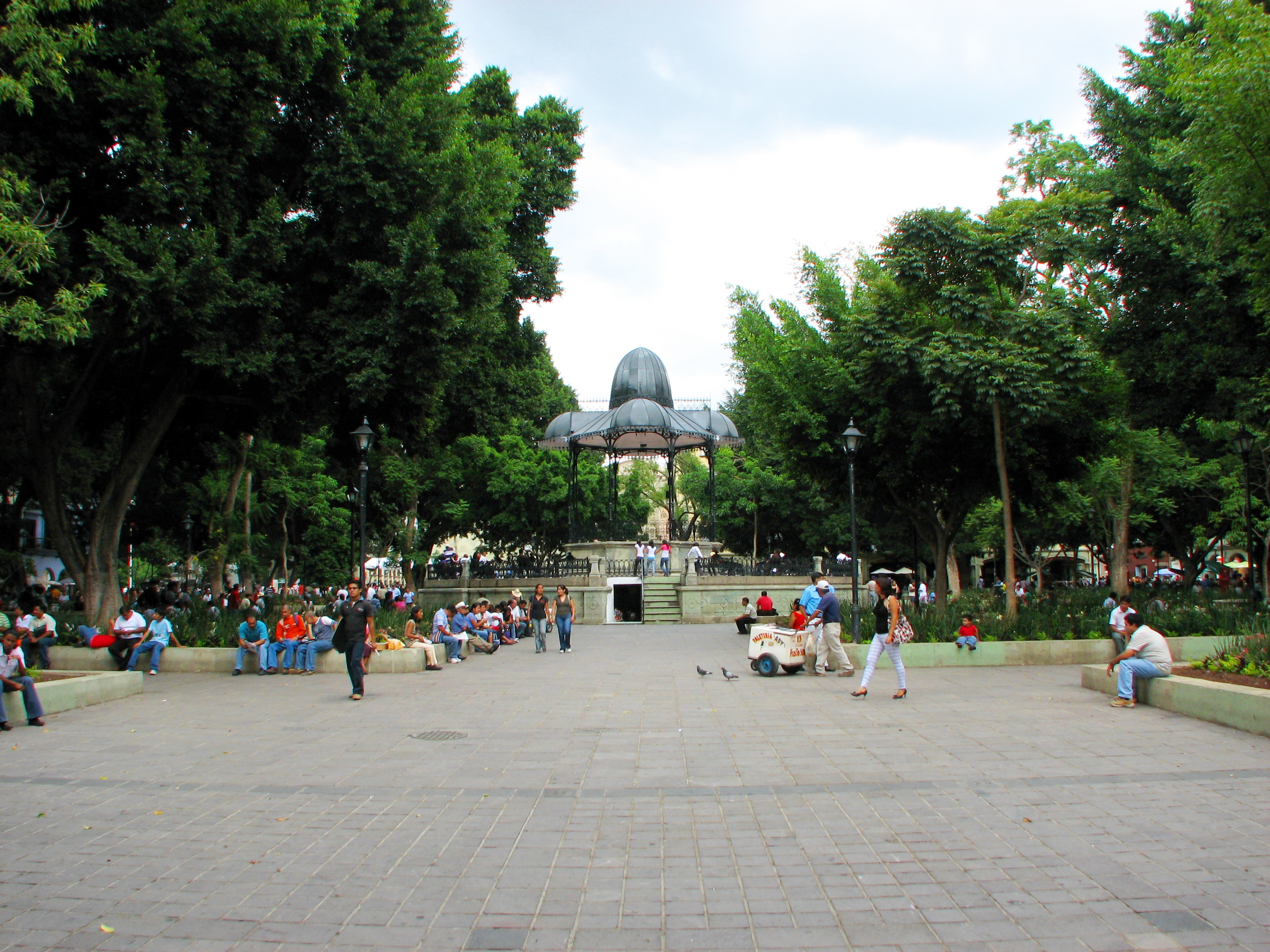
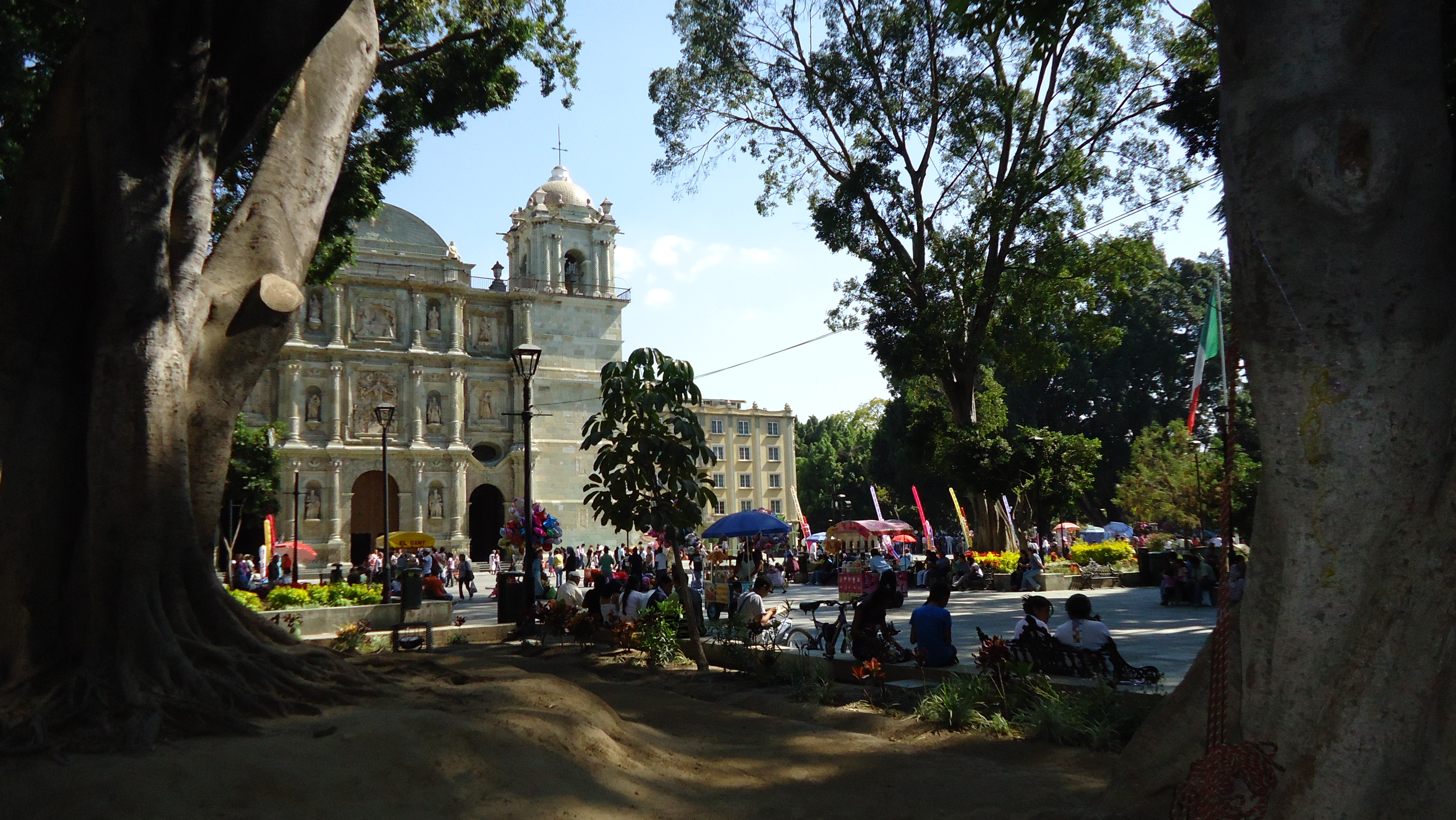
- View of Monte Albán, Macedonio Alcalá Theater, Temple of the Ex-Convent of Santo Domingo, Colonial Oaxaca, Zocalo in Oaxaca and view of the Zocalo.

- Coat of arms

- Location of the municipality within Oaxaca

- Location in Mexico
- Coordinates: 17°03′38″N 96°43′31″W
- Country: Mexico
- State: Oaxaca
- Founded: 1532
- Municipal status: 1879
- Named for: "Oaxaca" is a hispanicization of the Nahuatl place name "Huaxyacac". "de Juárez" was added in honor of Benito Juárez.

Government
  - Mayor: Raymundo Chagoya Villanueva

Area
  - City: 85.48 km^{2} (33.00 sq mi)
- Elevation of seat: 1,555 m (5,102 ft)

Population (2020)
  - City: 258,913
  - Density: 3,000/km^{2} (7,800/sq mi)
  - Metro: 713,925
  - Municipality: 270,955

Metro area GDP (PPP, constant 2015 values)
  - Year: 2023
  - Total: $11.7 billion
  - Per capita: $15,900
- Time zone: UTC−6 (CST)
- Postal code (of seat): 68000
- Area code: 951
- Website: municipiodeoaxaca.gob.mx (in Spanish)

UNESCO World Heritage Site
- Official name: Historic Centre of Oaxaca and Archaeological Site of Monte Albán
- Type: Cultural
- Criteria: i, ii, iii, iv
- Designated: 1987 (11th session)
- Reference no.: 415 o
- Region: Latin America and the Caribbean

Oaxaca de Juárez (Spanish pronunciation: [waˈxaka ðe ˈxwaɾes]), or simply Oaxaca (Valley Zapotec: Ndua), is the capital and largest city of the eponymous Mexican state of Oaxaca. It is the municipal seat for the surrounding municipality of Oaxaca, the most populous municipality in Oaxaca, and the fourth most densely populated municipality in Oaxaca, only being less densely populated than San Jacinto Amilpas, Santa Lucía del Camino, and Santa Cruz Amilpas. It is in the Centro District in the Central Valleys region of the state, in the foothills of the Sierra Madre at the base of the Cerro del Fortín, extending to the banks of the Atoyac River.

Heritage tourism is an important part of the city's economy, and it includes numerous colonial-era structures, significant archeological sites, and elements of the continuing native Zapotec and Mixtec cultures. The city, together with the nearby archeological site of Monte Albán, was designated in 1987 as a UNESCO World Heritage Site. It is the site of the month-long cultural festival called the "Guelaguetza", which features Oaxacan dance from the seven regions, music, and a beauty pageant for indigenous women.

The city is also known as la Verde Antequera (the green Antequera) due to its prior Spanish name (Nueva Antequera) and the variety of structures built from a native green stone. The name Oaxaca is derived from the Nahuatl name for the place, Huaxyacac, which was Hispanicized to Guajaca, later spelled Oaxaca. In 1872, "de Juárez" was added in honor of Benito Juárez, a native of this state who became president, serving from 1852 to 1872, and leading the country through challenges, including an invasion by France. The Zapotec name of the city, Ndua, is still used in the Zapotec language (Tlacolula Zapotec). The coat of arms for the municipality bears the image of Donají, a Zapotec woman hostage killed and beheaded by the Mixtec in conflict immediately after the Conquest.

== History ==
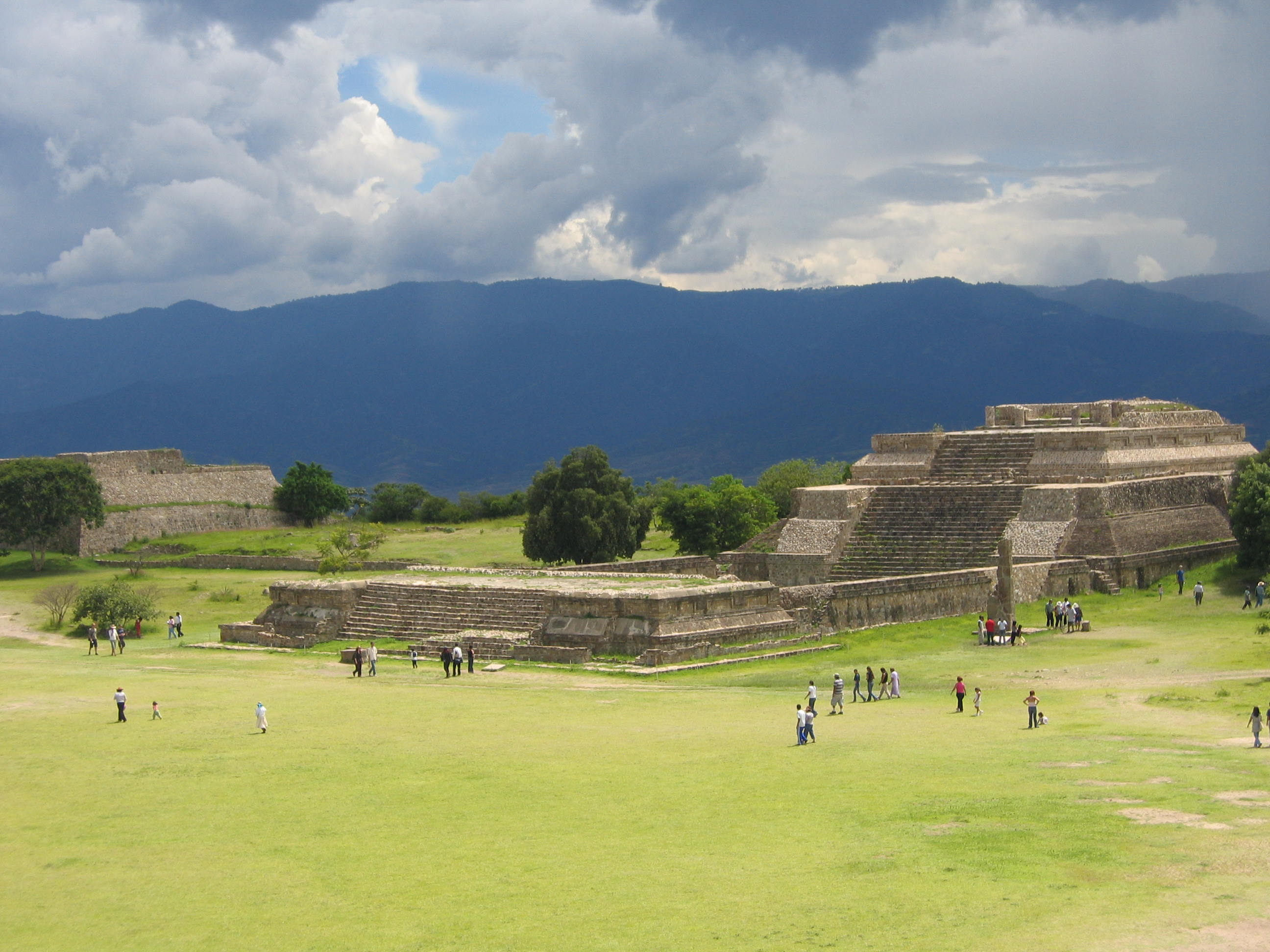
Monte Albán is regarded as the historical antecedent of the modern city of Oaxaca.

=== Early settlements ===
The Zapotec and Mixtec peoples had settlements in the valley of Oaxaca for thousands of years, especially in connection with the important ancient centers of Monte Albán and Mitla. The modern city of Oaxaca developed relatively near them. The Aztecs entered the valley in 1440 and named it "Huaxyacac", a Nahuatl phrase meaning "among the huaje" (Leucaena leucocephala) trees. They created a strategic military position at what is now called the Cerro (large hill) del Fortín to oversee the Zapotec capital of Zaachila and secure the trade route between the Valley of Mexico, Tehuantepec, and what is now Central America.

When the Spanish arrived in 1521, the Zapotec and the Mixtec were involved in one of their many wars. The Spanish conquest ended this fighting, imposing a kind of imperial peace on the area. At the same time, Spanish Catholic missionaries began evangelizing the indigenous peoples, urging them to convert.

=== Colonial period ===
The first Spanish expedition to Oaxaca arrived late in 1521, headed by Captain Francisco de Orozco, who was accompanied by 400 Aztec warriors. Hernán Cortés sent Francisco de Orozco to Oaxaca because Moctezuma II had said that the Aztecs' gold came from there. The Spanish expedition under Orozco set about building a Spanish city where the Aztec military post was at the base of the Cerro de Fortín.

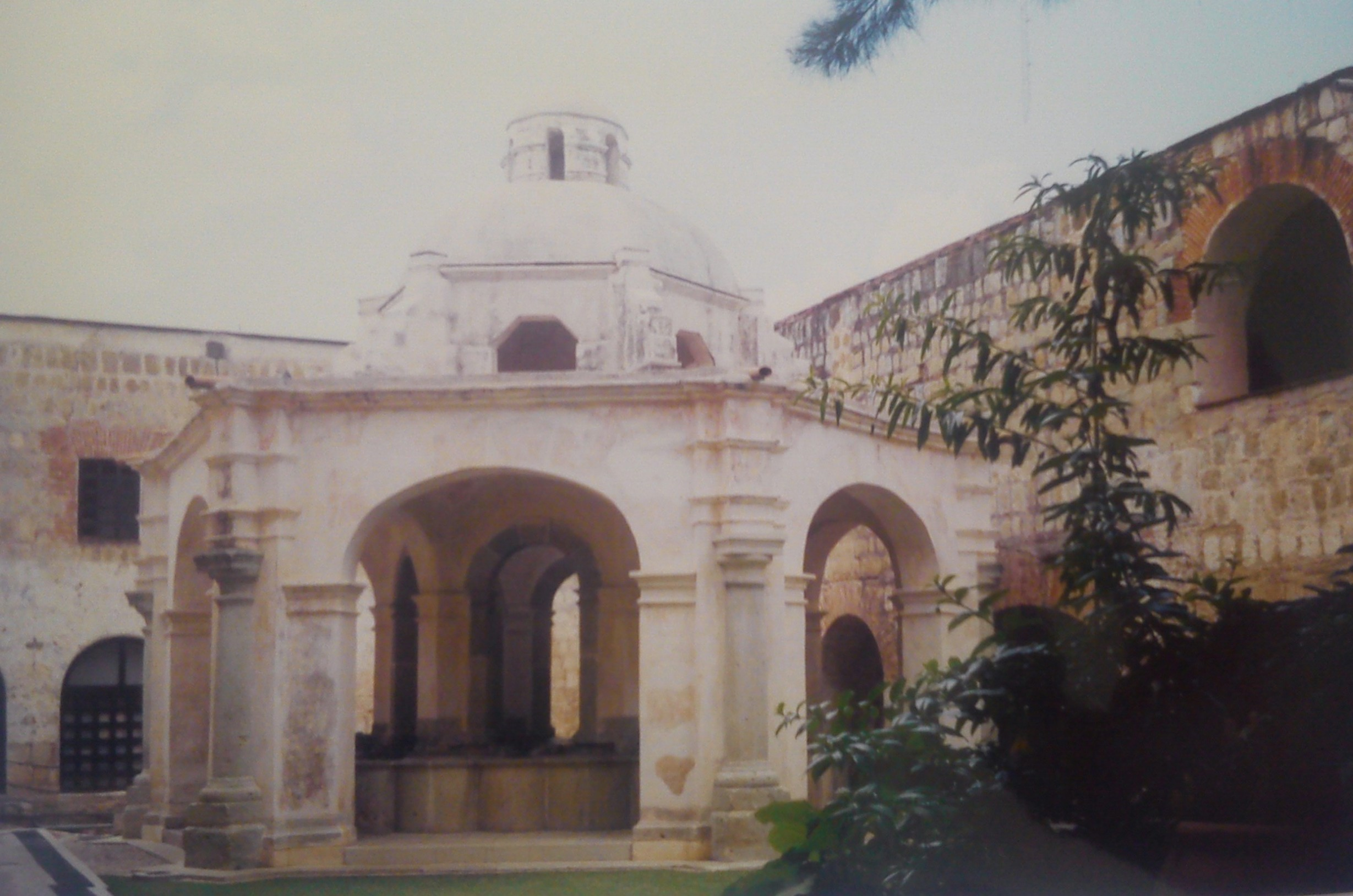
Los Lavaderos ("The Laundry", where the nuns used to hand wash clothing), in a former convent in the city of Oaxaca; today, a part of the Camino Real Hotel

Chaplain Juan Díaz gave the first mass in Oaxaca on the bank of the Atoyac River under a large huaje tree, where the Church of San Juan de Dios would be constructed later. This same chaplain added saints' names to the surrounding villages, in addition to keeping their Nahuatl names: Santa María Oaxaca, San Martín Mexicapan, San Juan Chapultepec, Santo Tomas Xochimilco, San Matías Jalatlaco, Santiago Tepeaca, etc. This group of Spaniards chose their first mayor, Gutierres de Badajoc, and their first town council, and began construction of the cathedral of Oaxaca in 1522. Their name for the settlement was Guajaca, a Hispanization of the Nahuatl name used by the Aztec (it was later spelled as Oaxaca).

The relatively independent village did not suit Hernán Cortés, who wanted to control power over the entire region. Cortés sent Pedro de Alvarado, who drove out most of the village's population. The original Spanish settlers appealed to the Spanish crown to recognize the village they founded, which it did in 1526, dividing the land among the Spaniards of Orozco's expedition. But three months later, Cortés forced the village's population out once again and replaced the town council with his own appointees. The founders appealed again to Spanish royal authority, this time to the viceroy in Mexico City, Nuño de Guzmán. He also sided with the founders; they reestablished the town in 1529, naming it Antequera, in honor of Nuño de Guzmán's hometown. Francisco de Herrera convened the new, Crown-approved town council. Juan Peláez de Berrio platted the new settlement.

Coat of Arms Antequera of Oaxaca

In the meantime, Cortés gained from the crown the title of the Marquis of the Valley of Oaxaca, which contains the disputed village. This enabled him to demand high taxes in the area and to control the territory that surrounded the village. The village had to survive while surrounded by other villages that answered to Cortés. These villages not only did not take orders from Antequera, they were hostile to it, most likely encouraged by Cortés.

To counter this, the village petitioned the Crown for elevation to city status, which would grant it certain rights, privileges, and exceptions. It would also ensure that the settlement remained under the king's direct control, rather than Cortés's. This petition was granted in 1532 by Charles V of Spain.

=== Early Mexico ===
After the Independence of Mexico in 1821, the city became the seat of a municipality. The city and municipality were renamed Oaxaca, formerly Antequera. In 1872, "de Juárez" was added to the city and municipality names to honor Benito Juárez, a native son who had begun his legal and political career here and who served as president of Mexico from 1858 until his death in 1872.

=== Modern history ===
The 2006 Oaxaca protests developed from state actions in 2005. Oaxaca's new state governor Ulises Ruiz Ortiz banned political demonstrations in the capital's main square and historic center, or zócalo. He acted to modernize the Zócalo as a tourist attraction, turning the state legislature building into a museum. In summer 2005, Oaxaca's urban middle classes joined in protests against these decisions.

In May 2006, the national teachers' union staged its annual occupation of the Zócalo, a union-negotiation tactic and local tradition held every summer since 1989. After a year of protests and growing resistance to the new governor, in 2006, the summer occupation of the square attracted more teachers than usual.

The government announced wage and employment benefit increases for teachers shortly thereafter. An internal conflict within the local teachers' union led to accusations that the bargaining had not been in the teachers' best interests. On the night of June 14, the state police attacked and tear-gassed the teachers still sleeping in the Zócalo, generating more public outrage against Governor Ruiz and the ruling Institutional Revolutionary Party.

Many radical groups merged with the teachers' union to form the Popular Assembly of the People of Oaxaca (APPO). This assembly defended the rights of several neighborhoods and organizations against government repression, in particular the "caravanas de la muerte" – death squads of government agents patrolling the city in police trucks. The assembly also closed government buildings and barricaded access roads to the city. It replaced the city's police force with the Honorable Cuerpo de Topiles, a civilian law force based on indigenous traditions of communal policing.

In October 2006, President Vicente Fox sent more than 10,000 paramilitaries to retake control of the city. Armed confrontations resulted in many deaths, including that of Indymedia journalists Bradley Roland Will, Roberto López Hernández, and Jorge Alberto Beltrán. In late December, teachers' union leaders announced an end to their strike. Several leaders of the APPO were arrested. These grassroots groups continued to clash with local and state government, but finally all the barricades were removed and they turned over control of the city.

== Geography ==
=== Climate ===
Oaxaca has a tropical savanna climate (Köppen climate classification Aw), due to its high altitude. During the dry season, temperatures during the day remain warm with an average high of 27.1 °C (80.8 °F) in the coolest month, December, and an average high of 33.3 °C (91.9 °F) in April, just before the beginning of the wet season. Although daytime temperatures are warm, nighttime temperatures are cool with an average low of 9 °C (48 °F) in January. Due to its altitude of 1,555 m (5,102 ft), the climate of Oaxaca is cooler than lowland areas at the same latitude. Precipitation is concentrated in the summer months with June being the wettest with an average precipitation of 171 mm (6.7 in).

Climate data for Oaxaca (1991–2020)
Month	Jan	Feb	Mar	Apr	May	Jun	Jul	Aug	Sep	Oct	Nov	Dec	Year
Record high °C (°F)	38.5 (101.3)	38.0 (100.4)	40.5 (104.9)	41.6 (106.9)	43.0 (109.4)	40.0 (104.0)	36.7 (98.1)	36.5 (97.7)	36.0 (96.8)	35.5 (95.9)	35.0 (95.0)	34.0 (93.2)	43.0 (109.4)
Mean daily maximum °C (°F)	28.9 (84.0)	31.1 (88.0)	33.3 (91.9)	34.9 (94.8)	33.8 (92.8)	30.9 (87.6)	30.1 (86.2)	30.0 (86.0)	29.1 (84.4)	29.3 (84.7)	29.0 (84.2)	28.9 (84.0)	30.8 (87.4)
Daily mean °C (°F)	19.6 (67.3)	21.4 (70.5)	23.5 (74.3)	25.4 (77.7)	25.3 (77.5)	23.7 (74.7)	23.0 (73.4)	23.0 (73.4)	22.6 (72.7)	21.9 (71.4)	20.6 (69.1)	20.0 (68.0)	22.5 (72.5)
Mean daily minimum °C (°F)	10.3 (50.5)	11.6 (52.9)	13.6 (56.5)	15.8 (60.4)	16.7 (62.1)	16.7 (62.1)	15.9 (60.6)	15.9 (60.6)	16.1 (61.0)	14.5 (58.1)	12.3 (54.1)	11.0 (51.8)	14.2 (57.6)
Record low °C (°F)	0.5 (32.9)	1.0 (33.8)	3.0 (37.4)	4.0 (39.2)	9.0 (48.2)	9.0 (48.2)	9.0 (48.2)	9.0 (48.2)	9.0 (48.2)	4.5 (40.1)	1.0 (33.8)	0.0 (32.0)	0.0 (32.0)
Average precipitation mm (inches)	2.4 (0.09)	4.6 (0.18)	17.6 (0.69)	47.3 (1.86)	97.9 (3.85)	188.3 (7.41)	118.6 (4.67)	131.8 (5.19)	163.6 (6.44)	63.1 (2.48)	9.1 (0.36)	9.0 (0.35)	853.3 (33.59)
Average precipitation days (≥ 0.1 mm)	1.0	1.3	2.3	5.7	10.5	17.2	16.9	16.5	17.2	7.6	2.3	0.9	99.4
Average relative humidity (%)	58	58	54	55	60	66	69	69	74	70	66	63	64
Mean monthly sunshine hours	282	260	295	285	264	184	202	178	162	245	267	267	2,891
Source 1: Servicio Meteorológico Nacional (precipitation days, humidity 1981–2000)
Source 2: Deutscher Wetterdienst (sun, 1961–1990) (Note: Station ID for Oaxaca. is 76775 Use this station ID to locate the sunshine duration)

== Economy and tourism ==
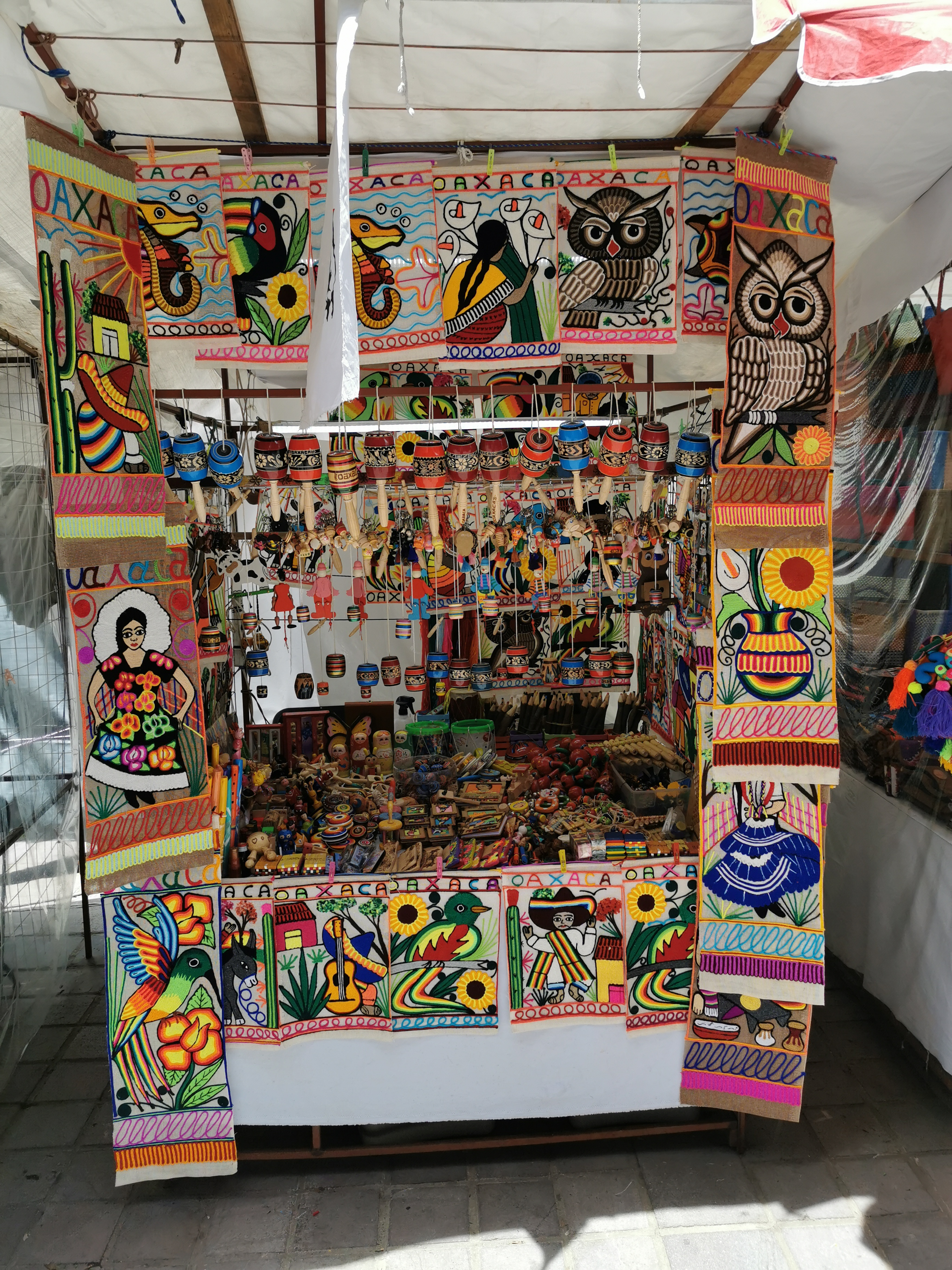
A street vendor at the Oaxaca zócalo

The city is the primary attraction of the state, which also relies economically on tourism. From 1984 to 2009, tourism became the dominant factor in Oaxaca's economy. The attractions are the verdant landscapes of the Oaxaca Valley and the architectural and cultural charms of the city itself. A massive 77% of the municipality of Oaxaca has employment that is related in some way to tourism. The 2006 Oaxaca protests had a severe negative impact on tourism revenue. The following largest economic sectors are mining and manufacturing, which employ 20% of the workforce.

The city centre was included in a World Heritage Site designated by UNESCO, in recognition of its treasure of historic buildings and monuments. Tourist activity peaks in three seasons: Holy Week, summer (especially during Guelaguetza) and New Year. Many of the tourists who come during Holy Week and for the New Year come from other parts of Mexico, including native Oaxacans returning to visit from their places of work. Most international visitors come during the summer.

== Landmarks ==
=== Plaza de la Constitución (Zócalo) ===
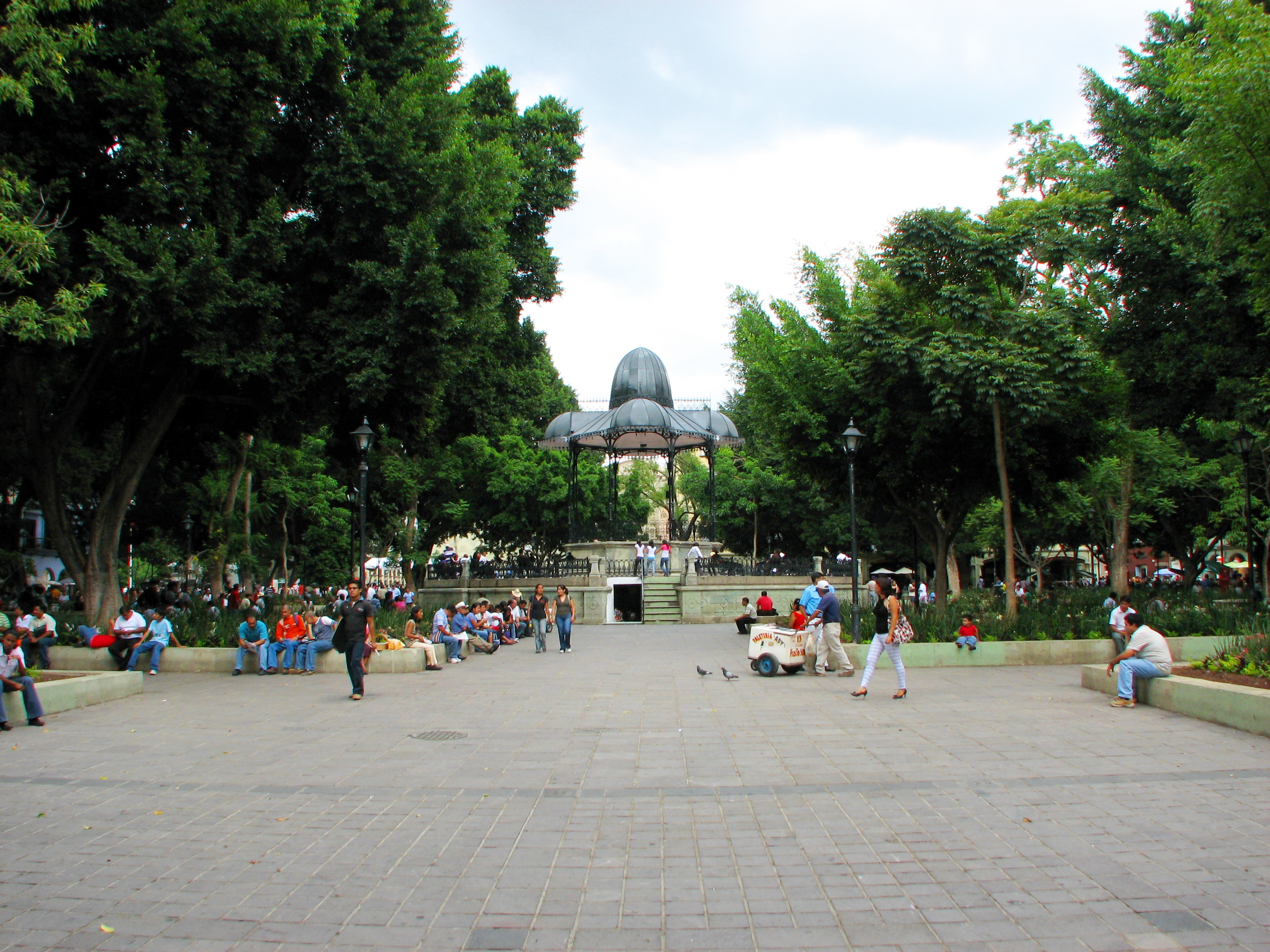
Bandstand and gardens located in the Zócalo

The Plaza de la Constitución, or Zócalo, was planned out in 1529 by Juan Peláez de Berrio. Throughout the colonial period, this plaza was never paved or had sidewalks; it had only a marble fountain installed here in 1739. This was removed in 1857 to make way for the bandstand, and trees were planted. In 1881, the vegetation here was rearranged, and in 1885, a statue of Benito Juárez was added. It was remodeled again in 1901, and a new Art Nouveau bandstand was installed. Fountains of green stone with capricious figures were installed in 1967. The bandstand in the center hosts the State Musical Band, La Marimba and other groups.

Various arcades surround the plaza. On the south side of the plaza are the Portales de Ex-Palacio de Gobierno, which was vacated by the government in 2005 and then reopened as a museum called "Museo del Palacio 'Espacio de Diversidad'" Other arcades include the "Portal de Mercadores" on the eastern side, "Portal de Claverias" on the north side and the "Portal del Señor" on the west side.

The State Government Palace is located on the main square. This site used to be the Portal de la Alhóndiga (warehouse), and in front of the palace is the Benito Juárez Market. The original palace was inaugurated in 1728, on the wedding day of the prince and princess of Spain and Portugal. The architectural style was Gothic. The building on this site was begun in 1832, inaugurated in 1870, and completed in 1887. The inside contains murals depicting Oaxaca's history from the pre-Hispanic era, the colonial era, and the post-Independence period. Most of these were painted by Arturo García Bustos in the 1980s.

The Federal Palace is located across from the cathedral and was the site of the old Archbishop's Palace until 1902. Its architecture is "neo-Mixtec," reflecting the nationalism of the early 20th century and the reverence for the Mixtec-Zapotec culture held in more recent times. The architectural elements copy a number of those from Mitla and Monte Albán.

Northwest of the Zócalo is the Alameda de León, a garden area that is essentially an annex of the main square. In 1576, viceroy Martín Enríquez de Almanza set aside two city blocks on which to build the city government offices, but they were never built here. One of the blocks was sold, and the other became a market. Antonio de León, governor of the state of Oaxaca, lived in front of this market and decided to turn it into a park in the 1840s, making it a small replica of the Alameda Central in Mexico City. In 1885, a statue of León was added.

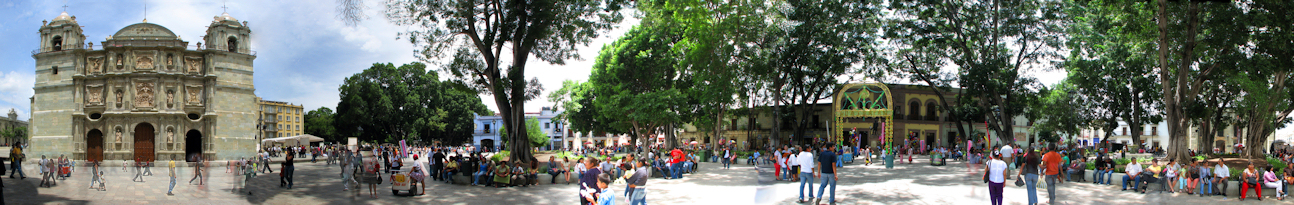
Alameda de León plaza

=== Andador Macedonio Alcalá ===
The Macedonio Alcalá Tourist Corridor is a street paved with green cantera. It was closed to traffic in 1985 and is now only open to pedestrian traffic. Along the street are notable places, such as the original building that housed the Universidad Autónoma Benito Juárez. The Museo de Arte Contemporáneo (Museum of Contemporary Art) or MACO is located here as is the Plazuela (small plaza) Labastida and the Parroquia de la Preciosa Sangre de Cristo (Parish of the Precious Blood of Christ).

=== Churches and religious buildings ===
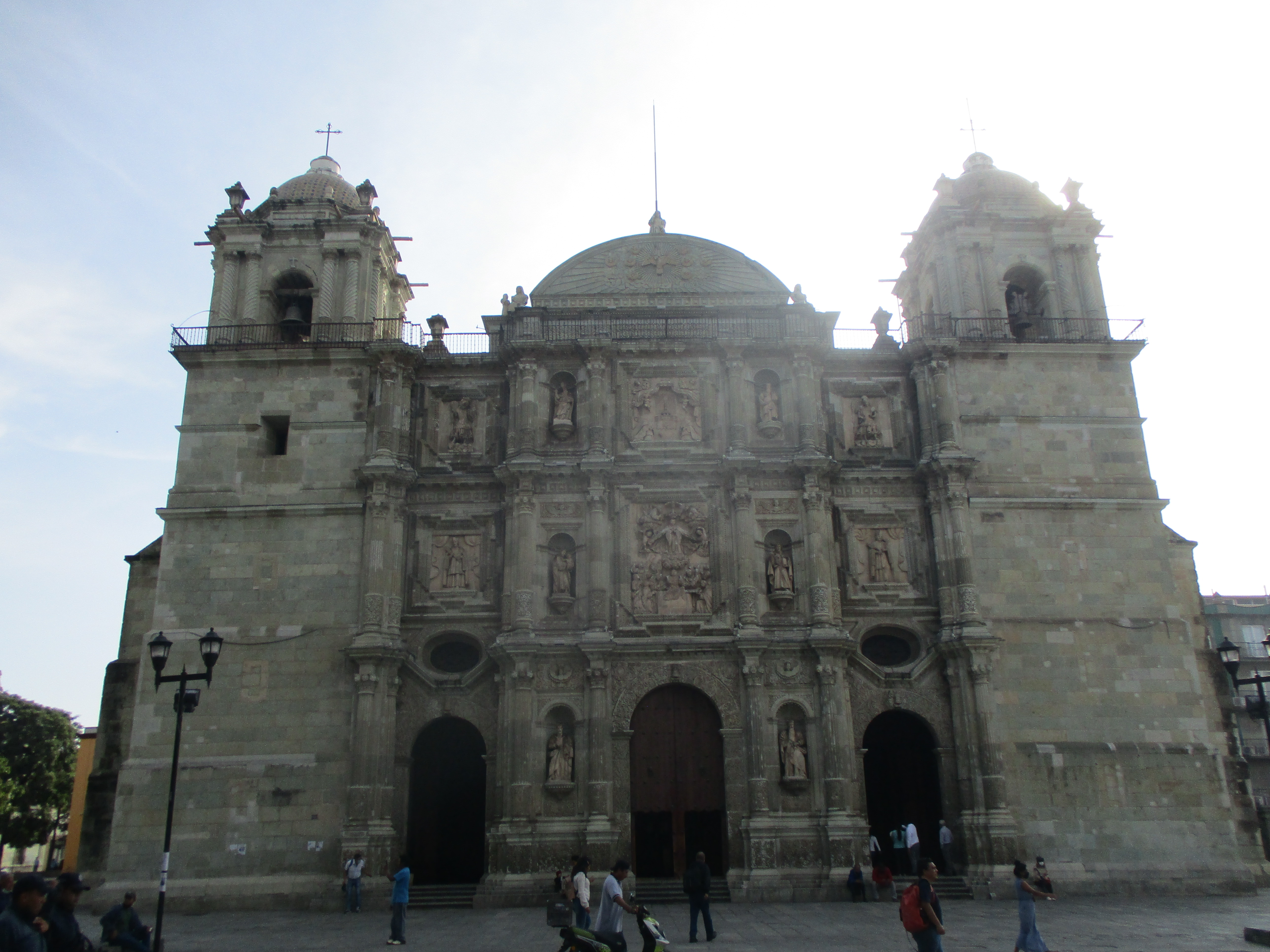
Oaxaca Cathedral

Oaxaca Cathedral, also referred to as Cathedral of Our Lady of the Assumption, is the third to be built as the first two were destroyed by large earthquakes in the 16th and 18th centuries. Construction of this third church began in 1702, and it was consecrated in 1733. Its facade is made of green cantera stone, a material commonly used in Oaxaca's buildings, and the interior is in Neoclassical style. The altar features a bronze statue of Our Lady of the Assumption (Nuestra Señora de al Asunción) sculpted by Tadoini and cast in Italy during the presidency of Porfirio Díaz.

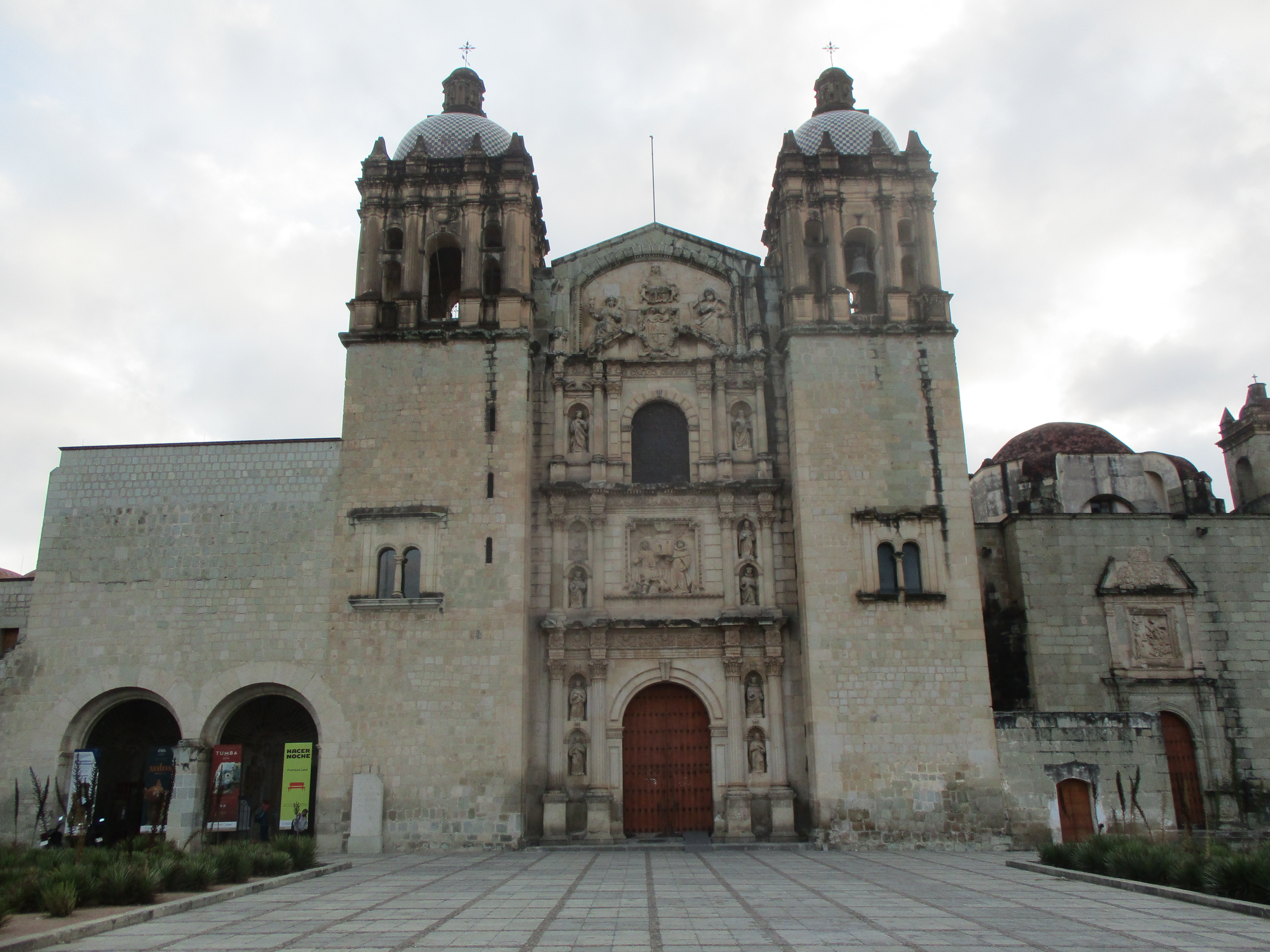
Santo Domingo de Guzmán Church

The church and former monastery of Santo Domingo de Guzmán is located 4 blocks north of the cathedral. It was constructed between 1555 and 1666. It is divided into two parts: the church and the former living/working areas of the monks. The front of the church is Renaissance-style, in the central relief, Saint Dominic and Hippolytus of Rome are holding up the church. After La Reforma around 1860, the church was converted into a stable, which caused severe deterioration of the building. It was returned to devotional use at the end of the 19th century. The living and working areas were converted into barracks and officers' quarters. In 1994, work began to convert this area into the Centro Cultural Santo Domingo.

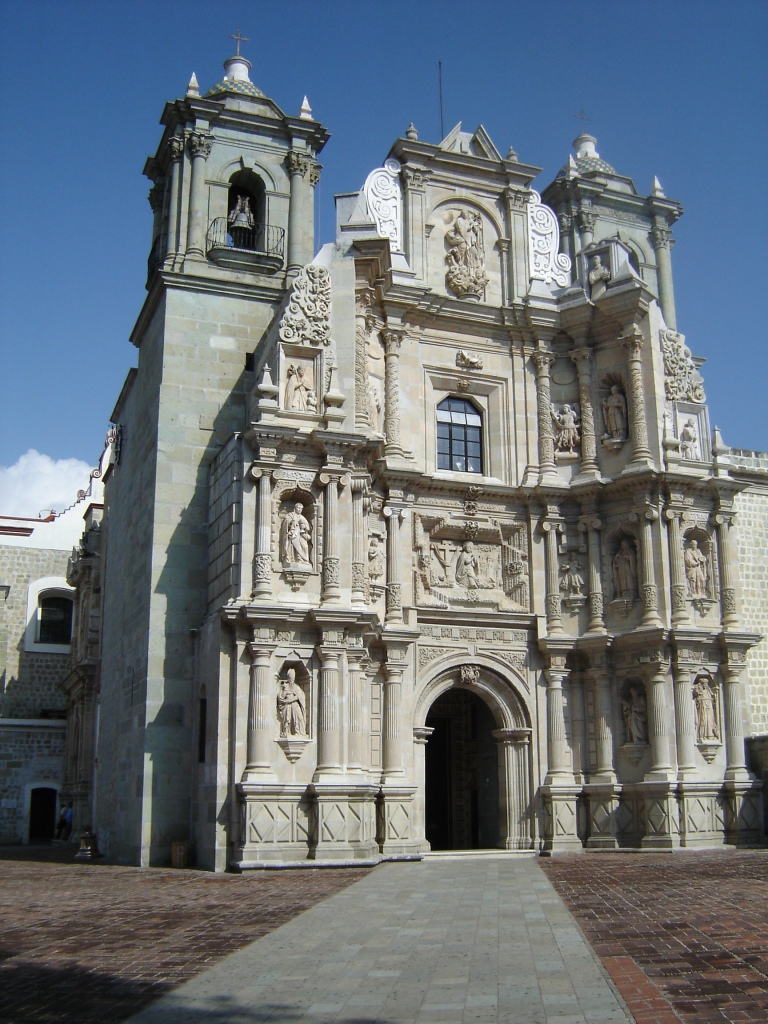
Basílica de Nuestra Señora de la Soledad

The Basílica de Nuestra Señora de la Soledad is located four blocks west of the cathedral on Avenida Independencia. It was built between 1682 and 1697 by Father Fernando Méndez on a site where, supposedly, an image of the Virgin Mary appeared in a box. It is of Baroque style, finished in 1690. Its front is carved from a reddish stone, sculpted to resemble a folding screen. In the back of the church is the Museo de la Basilica de Nuestra Señora de La Soledad, which exhibits the Virgin's dresses, offerings, and miniature paintings in her honor. The statue of the Virgin of Solitude, crowned with a 2 kg solid gold crown studded with diamonds, was recently the subject of a theft. Over the years, the cloister has been converted into a correctional facility, a teacher's college, and a district attorney's office. Now it serves as the Municipal Palace. The building conserves several valuable items such as paintings, sculptures and religious vestments and a pipe organ dated 1686.

The Church and ex-monastery of Del Carmen Alto belonged to the Carmelites, who established themselves here in 1696. The complex began as a hermitage built over the teocalli of Huaxyacac. Manuel Fernandez Fiallo financed the project. In the late 17th century, much of this space was occupied by a jail and barracks.

Church and former monastery of St John of God (Templo y Exconvento de San Juan de Dios), Oaxaca's oldest church still standing, completed in 1703. This is where the first mass in Oaxaca was held in 1521.

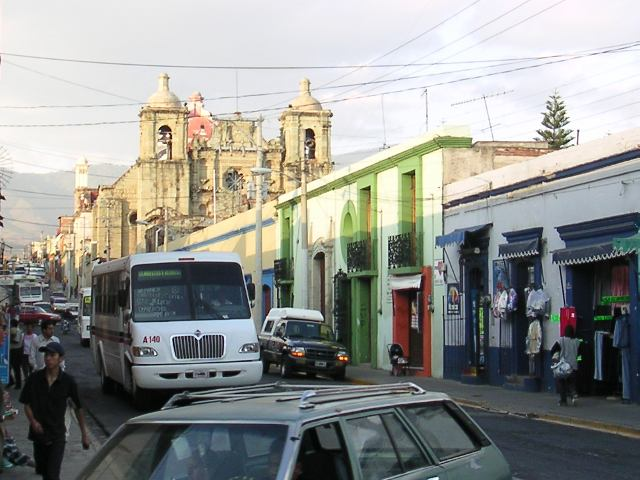
Calle Tinoco y Palacios, with the church of San Felipe Neri

Church of San Felipe Neri The Church of San Felipe Neri is considered a classic example of Baroque with estipite (inverted truncated pyramid) columns from the end of the 18th century, and has a large gilded main altarpiece. While the church overall is Baroque, the portal features additional decorative elements. Benito Juárez married Margarita Maza here in 1841.

Ex monastery of San Catalina was built in the second half of the 16th century by Dominican friar Hernando de Carvarcos, who was also responsible for the Santo Domingo de Guzmán monastery. In 1862, the monastery became a jail, and at the end of the 19th century, the southern part became the Municipal Palace. Since 1976, it has been a hotel, called Hotel Camino Real.

The Church of the Company of Jesus (Iglesia de la Compañia de Jesús), located to the southwest of the Zócalo, was built by the Jesuits in 1579 and consecrated to Francis Xavier and the Immaculate Conception. The towers were destroyed by a series of earthquakes and never rebuilt. Inside the chapel is a statue of the Virgin of Guadalupe with a prayer written in Spanish, English, Náhuatl as well as 12 other languages native to the state of Oaxaca, including four dialects of Zapotec.

=== Monte Albán ===
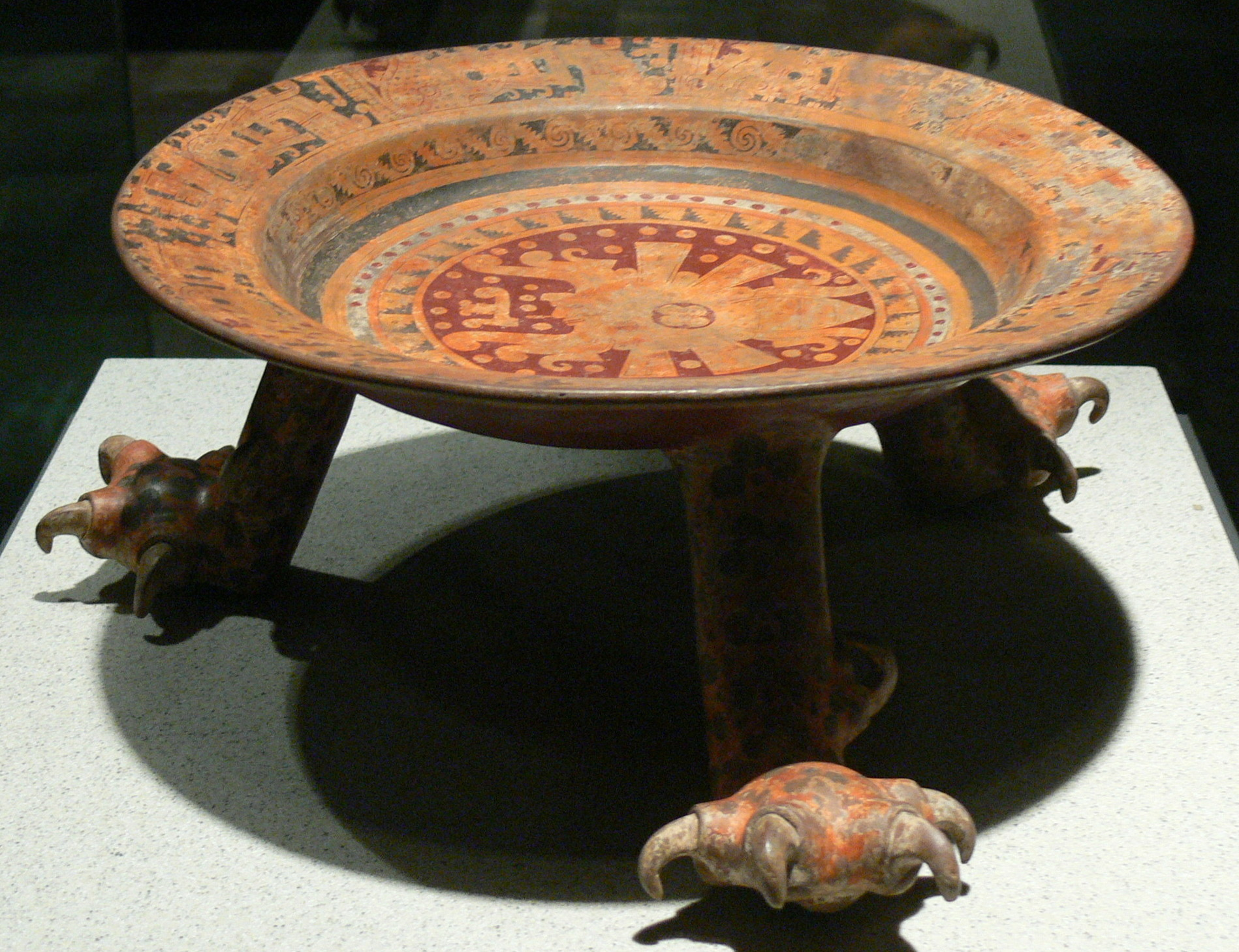
Ceramic plate from Monte Albán

Monte Albán is a pre-Hispanic city that was an ancient capital of the Zapotecs. It reached its peak between 500 BCE and 800 CE with about 35,000 inhabitants. Monte Albán is known for its architecture, its carved stones, and its ceramic urns. In 1987, it was declared a World Heritage Site, along with the city of Oaxaca itself.

=== Markets ===
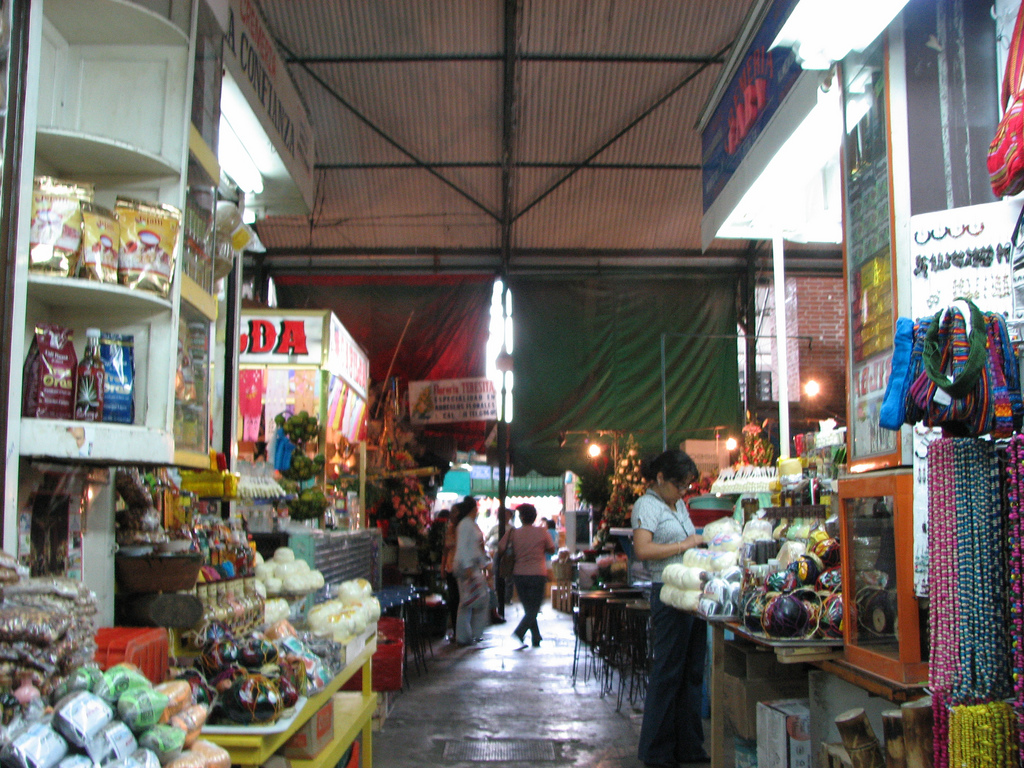
Vendor stalls at the Mercado Benito Juárez

The Benito Juárez Market is located one block south of the Zócalo on Flores Magón and Las Casas, but it takes up the entire block to 20 de Noviembre and Aldama streets. It offers flowers, fruit, ices, fruit drinks, handcrafts, leather goods, hats and knives, among other things. The block to the south houses the Mercado (Market) 20 de Noviembre which is the official name, but this market is commonly known as the "Mercado de la Comida (food)" because of the food stands that dominate the place. It is recommended by México Desconocido magazine for Oaxacan regional dishes such as moles, tasajo, tlayudas, pan de yema (a type of egg bread), chapulines (fried grasshoppers in chili), Oaxaca cheese (known locally as "quesillo"), queso fresco (lit. "fresh cheese"), as well as very large cups of hot chocolate made locally that is often spiced with cinnamon and almonds.

=== Parks and gardens ===
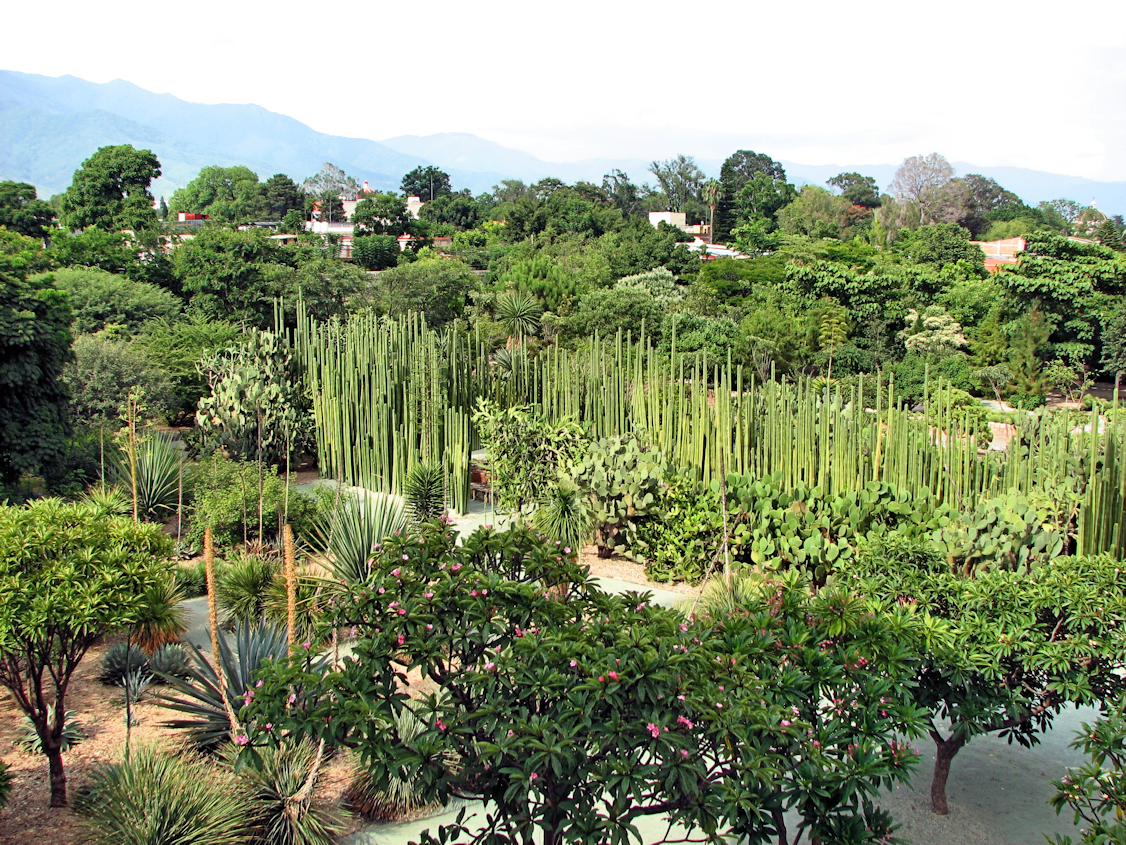
Jardín Etnobotánico de Oaxaca at the Temple of Santo Domingo

The city contains many parks, gardens and plazas, many of which were former monastery lands, for example, the Jardín Etnobotánico de Oaxaca, surrounding the former monastery of Santo Domingo. Even better known is the Plaza de la Danza y Jardín Sócrates complex on Morelos Street at the foot of the Cerro del Fortín. It is part of the area bounded by the Basilica de la Soledad and the Church of San José. The Plaza de la Danza was constructed in 1959 by Eduardo Vasconcelos to host the annual Bani-Stui-Gulal (representation of antiquity) dance, held the day before the Guelaguetza festival. The Plaza also hosts other cultural events, including art shows, concerts, and political rallies. The Socrates Garden is the old atrium of the Basilica de la Soledad, converted into a public park in 1881. It features a bronze chalice cast in that year. In 1981, the Garden was remodeled, adding a new layer of stone to the floor. The Cerro de Fortín next to it bears in stone letters Benito Juárez's slogan, "El respeto al derecho ajeno es la paz" (Respect for others' rights is peace). The Antonia Labastida Garden is named after a woman who fought with Porfirio Díaz during the French Intervention. This park has become a place for artists and artisans to display their wares.

== Culture ==
=== Museums ===
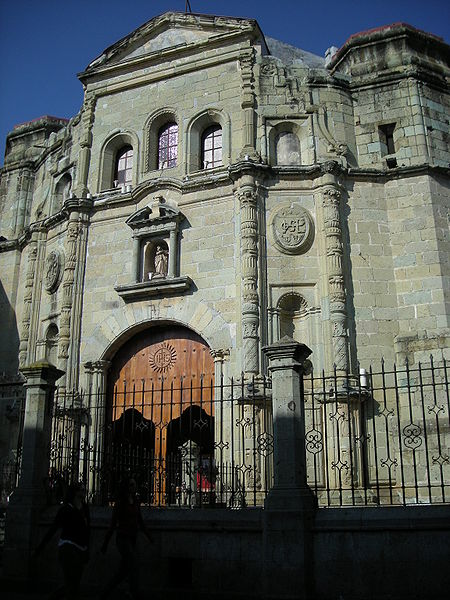
Church of the Company of Jesus

The Centro Cultural de Santo Domingo occupies the former monastery buildings attached to Santo Domingo church, and were restored in 1996 and considered to be one of the best restoration works in Latin America. Some important artifacts from Monte Albán are displayed here. In the center of the Centro Cultural, there is a courtyard with a fountain and a very large staircase. The passages along the courtyard have vaulted ceilings, cupolas, and intricate corridors. Much of the Centro Cultural is occupied by the Museo de las Culturas de Oaxaca (Museum of Oaxacan Cultures), whose entrance is the one pilgrims used to use to enter the church area of the complex. This museum was placed in the Centro Cultural in 1964, after initially being in the Instituto de Ciencias y Artes, among other places. The museum specializes in Zapotec and Mixtec cultures, covering ten halls and one auditorium. In Sala III is displayed the "Tesoro Mixteco" (Mixtec Treasure), which is a collection of offerings that were discovered by archeologist Alfonso Caso in Tomb 7 of Monte Álban. These offerings include hundreds of pieces of jewelry made of gold and silver. They make up the richest collection of gold and silver smithing of ancient Mexico. Another important exhibit is the objects from Tomb 5 of Lambitieco, which dates back to 700 C.E. and from Monte Albán. The museum has rooms dedicated to everyday items from the colonial period as well. The center also contains the Biblioteca Fray Francisco de Burgoa (Fray Francisco de Burgoa Library) which holds over 25,000 degrees that were conferred from the 15th to the 20th century from the Universidad Autónoma Benito Juárez in Oaxaca.

The Museum of Contemporary Art (Museo de Arte Contemporáneo de Oaxaca, MACO) is housed in the so-called Casa de Cortés. It is one of the oldest buildings in the city and one of the most representative of non-religious buildings. It dates from after the death of Hernán Cortés and could never have served as his house. Although it has been modified somewhat over the years, it still conserves its basic layout with rooms surrounding three courtyards. The architectural style is basically Andalucian modified by Oaxaca traditions. The facade has two levels, and the doors and windows have lintels and are protected by wrought iron railings. To the far left of the facade, two arched entrances permit the entrance of carriages to the third courtyard. The leading portal, which is Spanish Baroque, has three levels. In the first, there are two "tritóstila" columns supporting the balcony, which has wrought-iron railings. On the second level, two Solomonic columns flank a window. The jambs of the window are decorated with circles, and the lintel with inverted curves. At the top of the window is the Jesuit seal. The third level contains a central niche with a sculpture of an archangel as well as the coats of arms of the Laso de la Vega and the Pinelo families. Solomonic columns flank this group. The state of Oaxaca acquired the house and, in 1986, initially housed the Museo Historico Urbano de Oaxaca. The museum was created with help from the state government, the José F. Gómez Foundation, painter Francisco Toledo, and the Instituto Nacional de Bellas Artes. Its permanent collection contains works by Rufino Tamayo, Toledo, Nieto, Aquinos, and others.

The Museo de los Pintores Oaxaqueños (Museum of Oaxacan Painters) is located north of the Alameda de León on Avenida Independencia in a former 18th-century mansion. It is dedicated to local artists such as Rodolfo Morales whose work is on permanent display. The museum has also featured exhibitions by Felipe Morales, Rodolfo Nieto, Alejandro Santiago and Francisco Toledo.

The Casa de Culturas Oaxaqueñas used to be the Church and ex-monastery Los Siete Príncipes, dating from the 18th century. The only part still used for religious purposes is the small chapel. The complex was restored in the 1960s, and in 1970, the Casa opened. It houses the Instituto Oaxaqueño de la Cultura, a state government entity that promotes culture and the arts.

The Rufino Tamayo Museum (Museo Arte Prehispánico de Rufino Tamayo) or Museo Rufino Tamayo, has an important collection of pre-Hispanic art that the painter himself collected. He donated the collection, as well as the house that is now the museum, to his home state (Oaxaca) in 1974. This house, which was known as the Casa de Villanaza, was built in the 18th century. It first housed the State Museum Archives, before becoming what it is today. The museum exhibits over 1150 pieces from different Mesoamerican periods, including Mayan steles, ceramic dogs from Colima and stone faces from the Gulf of Mexico coast. The purpose of the museum is to showcase the aesthetic and cultural value of these works.

The Religious Museum of the Ex monastery of La Soledad is located next to the Basilica of La Soledad. It contains objects such as paintings, sculptures, and vestments. It is located in the southwest portion of the old monastery.

The Instituto de Artes Gráficos de Oaxaca (Graphic Arts Institute of Oaxaca) contains an extensive collection of graphic designs, both present and past.

The Casa de Juárez is a museum devoted to the life of Benito Juárez. It belonged to someone named Antonio Salanueva, but Juárez lived here from 1818 to 1828 after arriving from his hometown of Guelatao. It contains documents related to his presidency as well as furnishings designed to recreate the environment of that period. Its architecture is typical of homes built in this city in the 18th century and located on Garcia Vigil 609. It also contains ordinary artifacts from that time period, some of which belonged to Juárez.

Hemeroteca Publica de Oaxaca "Nestor Sánchez" (Nestor Sanchez Public Newspaper Library of Oaxaca) is located behind the ex-convent of Santo Domingo, along with the Jardin Ethobotánico (Ethnobotanic Garden) at the corner of Reforma and Constitución. These two occupy more than 2 hectares, which used to be the gardens of the convent of Santa Domingo.

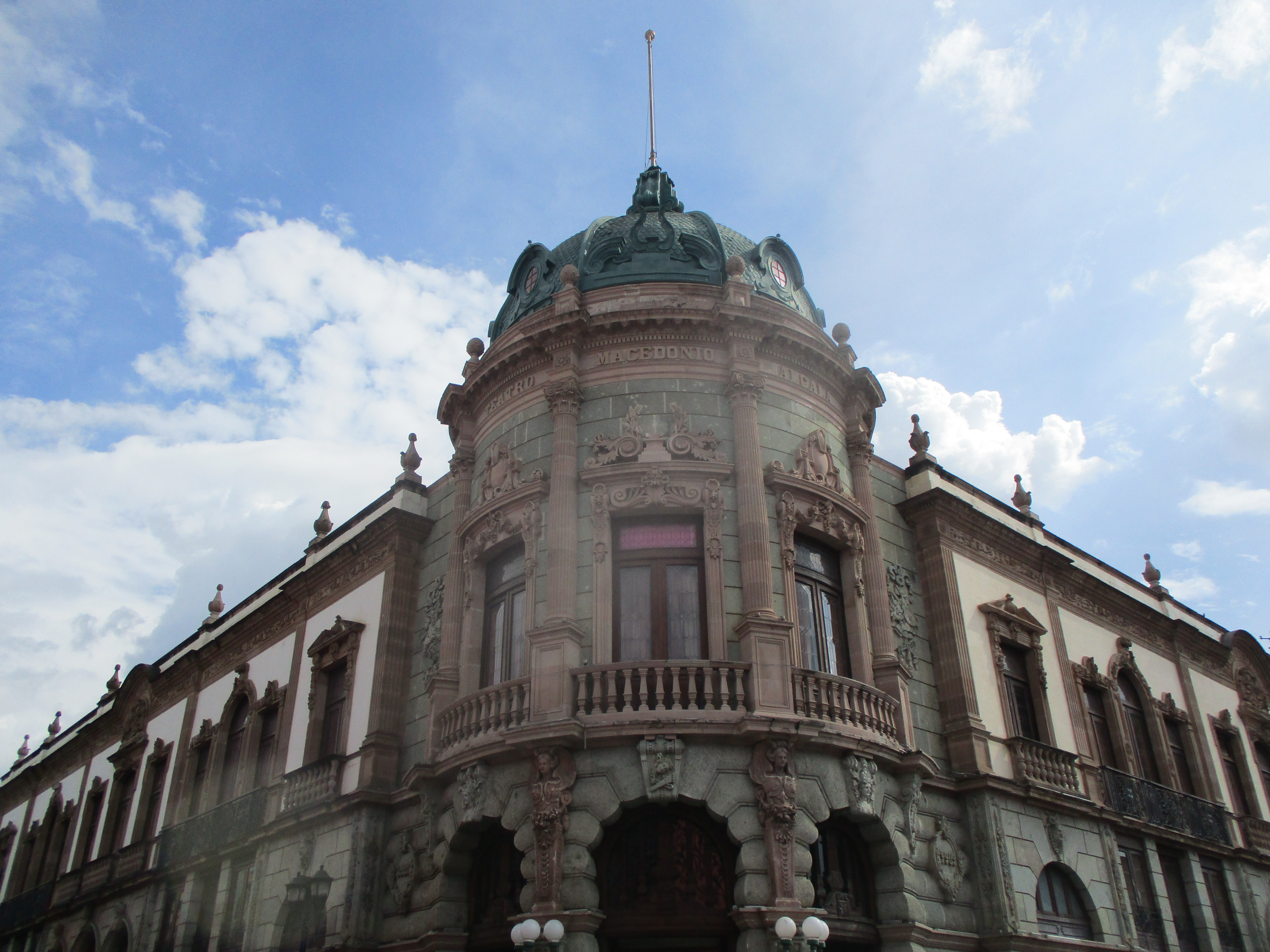
El Teatro Macedonio Alcalá

Teatro Macedonio Alcalá is a working theatre and also houses a collection of romantic art. Built between 1903 and 1909, it was initially named the Luis Mier y Terán Theater. The design is typical of the Porfirio Díaz period, which ended the 19th century and began the 20th. It was later renamed the Jesús Carranza Theater. The current name dates back to 1932, honoring the composer of the state anthem "Dios Nunca Muere" (God Never Dies). The theatre has three parts: the vestibule, the main hall, and the stage. The main entrance is on the corner. On the Armenta and López Street sides, the lower level is occupied by shops and by the Miguel Cabrera Salon, which hosts art exhibits. The vestibule is Louis XV style with a white marble staircase, and the main hall is in "Imperial" style, in which the anthropomorphic columns stand out.

Other cultural places of interest include the Alvarez Bravo Photography Center, the Oaxaca Stamp Museum, the Railway Museum of Southern Mexico (in the old train station), and the Planetarium located on the Cerro del Fortín.

=== Street art and printmaking ===
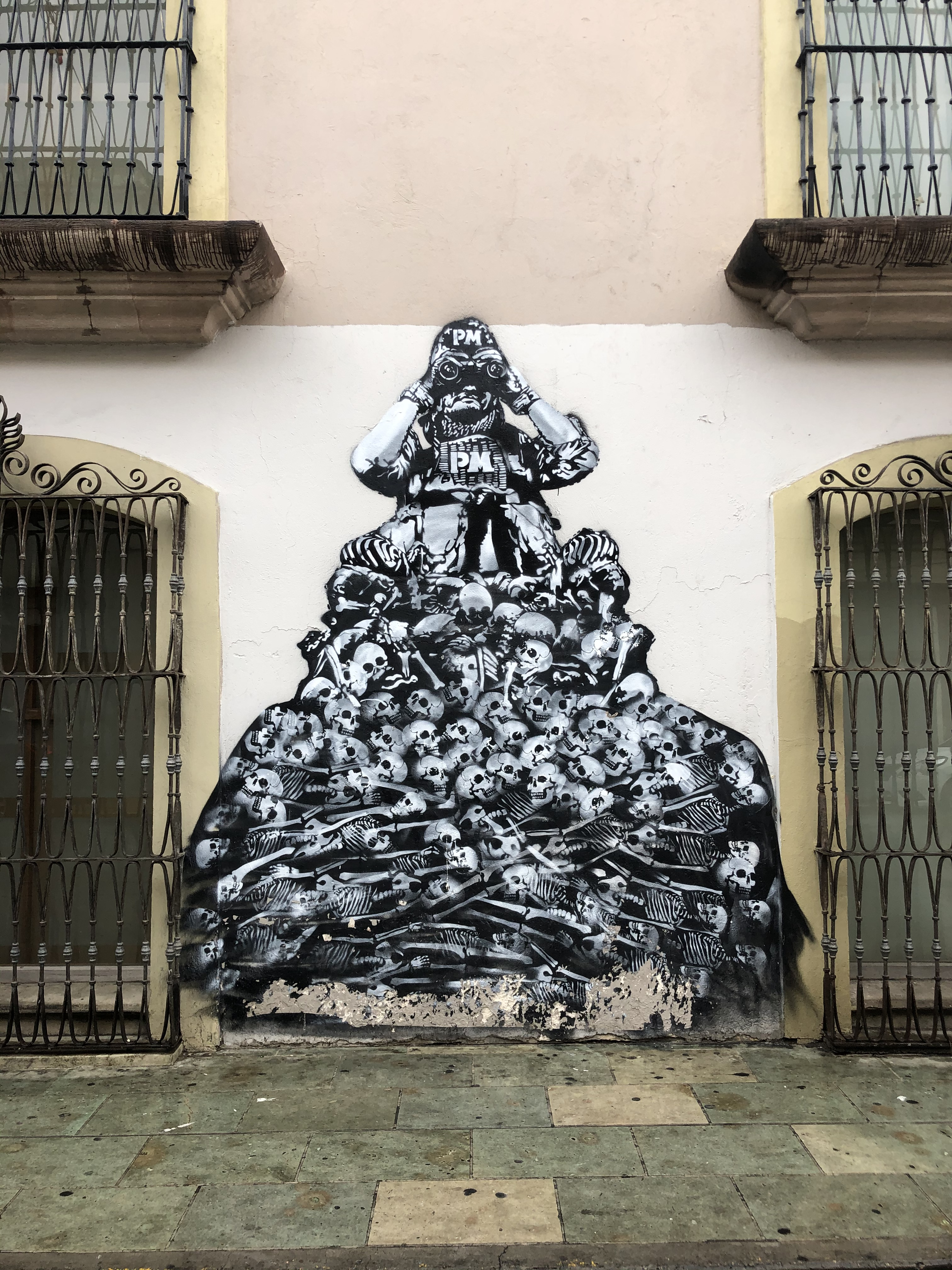
2019 political mural depicting authority figure labeled "PM" atop skeletal remains

Following the violent suppression of the 2006 Oaxaca protests, the city went from having a shortage of printing presses in the 1980s to becoming the "capital of Mexican printmaking" in 2017. Several art collectives making political work in printmaking, muralism, and street art formed after the 2006 crisis.

Several printmaking collectives emerged, including Asamblea de Artistas Revolucionarios de Oaxaca (ASARO), Colectivo Subterráneos, Lapiztola, Taller Artístico Comunitario, Burro Press, and Cooperativa Gráfica Oaxaca. By the late 2010s, at least 10 to 20 active printmaking workshops operated throughout the city. Collectives operate through a democratic assembly format, with most works unsigned or attributed collectively to avoid persecution and emphasize collective causes over individual identity.

Oaxacan printmaking has been exhibited at the Erie Art Museum, UCLA's Fowler Museum, Princeton University, the Library of Congress, the Chrysler Museum of Art, and the Maxwell Museum of Anthropology. The collectives continue to address political issues such as gentrification and violence against women.

=== Festivals and traditions ===
==== Guelaguetza ====
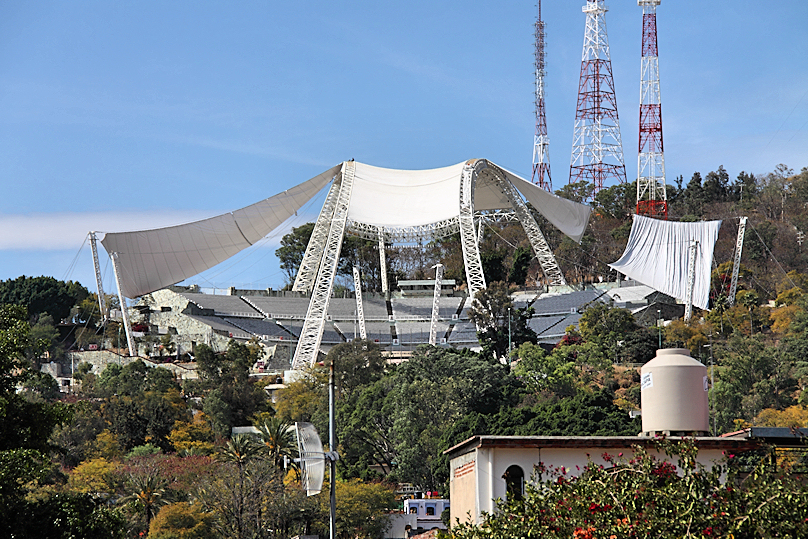
The Guelaguetza Auditorium, completed in 2010

The Guelaguetza, also known as the Fiestas de los Lunes del Cerro (Festivals of Mondays at the Hill), is a significant cultural event in the city with origins in pre-Hispanic times. The "Hill" is the Cerro del Fortín, which was the scene of the annual rites to the goddess Centeótl, or goddess of the corn. The hill had a teocalli, or sacred plaza, built by the Aztecs. The ritual would end with the sacrifice of a young maiden chosen to represent the goddess.

This rite was prohibited by the Spanish after the Conquest, who also destroyed the teocalli. In its place, they constructed the Church of Our Lady of Mount Carmen, now known as Carmen Alto. The recently baptized Mixtecs and Zapotecs then replaced ceremonies to Centeótl with those to this manifestation of the Virgin Mary, at the same place, the Cerro del Fortín.

This revised festival grew over time into the largest and most anticipated in the town. In 1932, the city of Oaxaca celebrated its 400th anniversary and decided to combine these festivities with those of the Cerro del Fortín, adding traditional dances, music, regional cuisine, and Margarita Santaella as the first Miss Oaxaca, along with the religious rites. The word "guelaguetza" is from Zapotec and means offering, sympathy, caring, and cooperation. This first Guelaguetza was such a hit that organizers decided to repeat it every year at the Cerro del Fortin, on all the Mondays of July starting in 1953, becoming an amalgam of Oaxacan festivals from many parts of the state.

Initially, the festival took place at the foot of the Cerro del Fortín, where the land's curve makes for a natural theatre. Since 1974, many of the events, which have grown in number, have been moved to various venues, including the then-inaugurated Guelaguetza Auditorium. This is a Greek-style venue that seats 11,400 people.

One venue is the Church of Santo Domingo de Guzmán, where regional bands perform, dressed in colorful costumes as part of the opening ceremonies. They march from here to Oaxaca Cathedral, where they are joined by folk dance groups such as the China Oaxaqueñas, the Chilenas de Pinotepa Nacional, and the Jarabes Serranos. Another major event, held at the Jardin Socrates, is a beauty pageant for indigenous women from different regions of Oaxaca state. The winner represents the goddess Centeótl and presides over the festivities along with public officials. The Bamo-Stui-Gulal takes place at the Plaza de la Danza and represents the history of Oaxaca and the Guelaguetza itself. The Plaza is divided into four quadrants, each representing a different period in Oaxaca's history. Another event, hosted in the Auditorium, is a reenactment of the Legend of Donají, set during the Conquest. On the streets of the city, there are parades with children and giant papier-mâché puppets.

==== Noche de Rábanos ====
The "Noche de Rábano" or Night of the Radishes is a tradition of the city of Oaxaca. Artisans show off designs created from large radishes, often decorated with other plant materials. The event lasts only a few hours but draws most of the city's population to the main square to view the creations. It occurs each year on 23 December.

The event developed from a Dominican Christmas tradition, when they would have a large dinner on the night of 23 December. To decorate the tables, indigenous servants of the monks would carve radishes and adorn them with flowers and other plants. This led to 23 December, which is known as the Night of the Radishes. This led to a special market on this day, selling radishes along with two other popular Christmas plants, the Flor Inmortal (immortal flower) and corn husks. This market has grown into a significant cultural event and is now sponsored by the city, which fills the main square on that day. The day also includes a competition in which radish creations are judged on originality, technical skill, and beauty.

==== Donají ====
Donají was a high-ranking Zapotec woman in pre-Hispanic Mitla. When she was born, a seer predicted that she would die for her country. When she grew up, the Zapotec were involved in one of their many wars with the Mixtec, who generally dominated the area. One day, Zapotec warriors brought a prisoner, a Mixtec prince named Nucano, to Mitla. Taking pity on him, Donají took care of his wounds. When he healed, he asked her to free him, which she did. The war continued, and the Zapotec king and Donaji were forced to abandon their capital of Zaachila. Peace negotiations were attempted, but the Mixtec did not trust the Zapotec king, taking Donají captive as insurance.

This occurred during the Conquest, when the Spanish Christian evangelization of the country had begun. Donají asked for baptism and was renamed Doña Juana de Cortés.

As the Mixtec feared, the Zapotec broke the peace treaty, attacking Monte Albán while the Mixtec slept. The survivors killed their hostage. Later, the body of Donají, decapitated, was found in the Atoyac River. Time passed. One day, a shepherd came to the place where the river buried Donaji. A fragrant lily flower grew there. Fifteen days later, he returned to find the same flower, still fresh and fragrant in the same place, as if a mysterious force was preserving it. She is honored by having her severed head as part of the coat of arms of the city of Oaxaca. In addition, her story is reenacted every year at the Guelaguetza festival.

==== Film festival ====
Until 2022, its final year, Oaxaca hosted the Oaxaca FilmFest every fall.

=== Food and drink ===
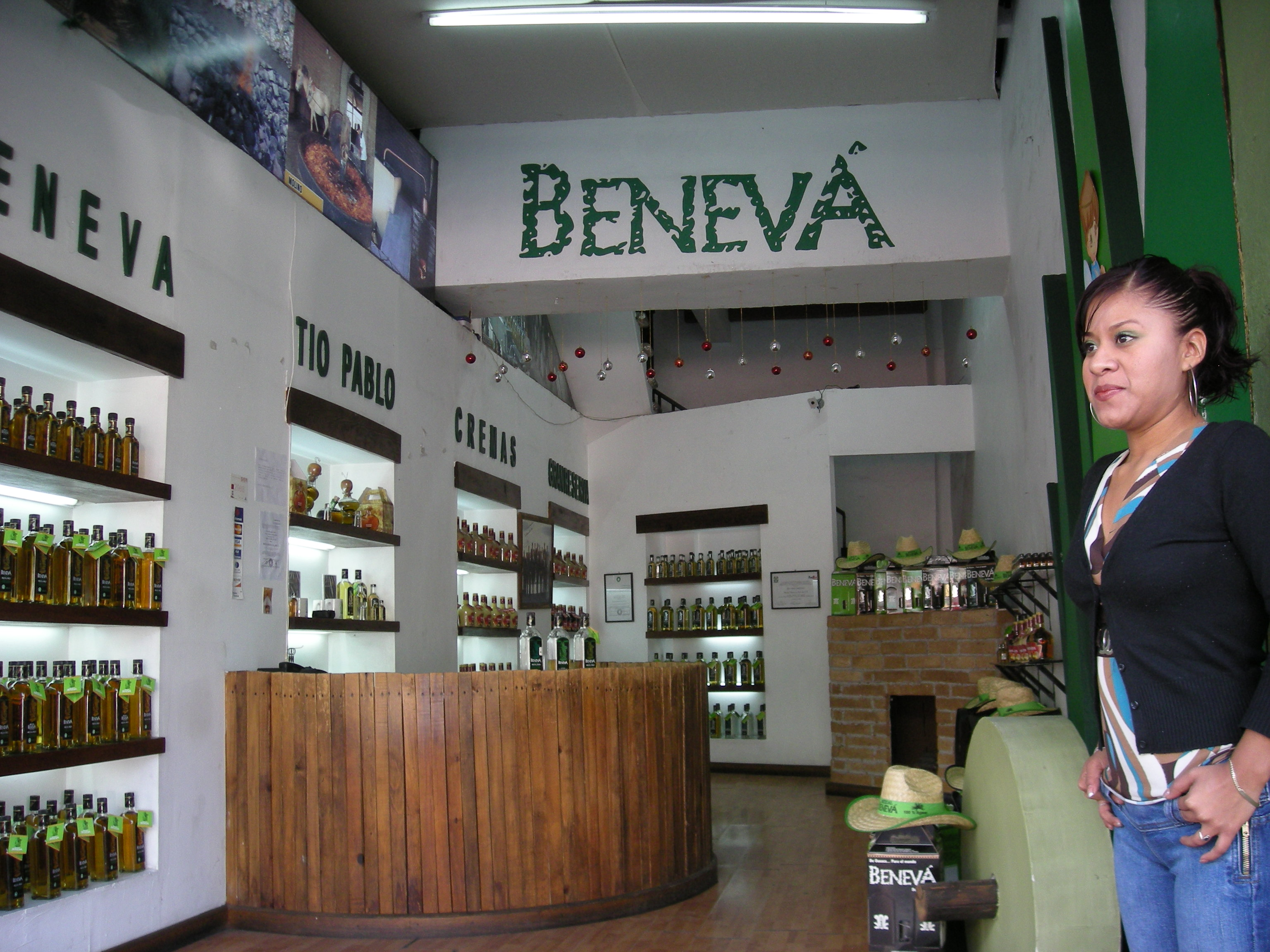
A Benevá mezcal dealer in the city of Oaxaca

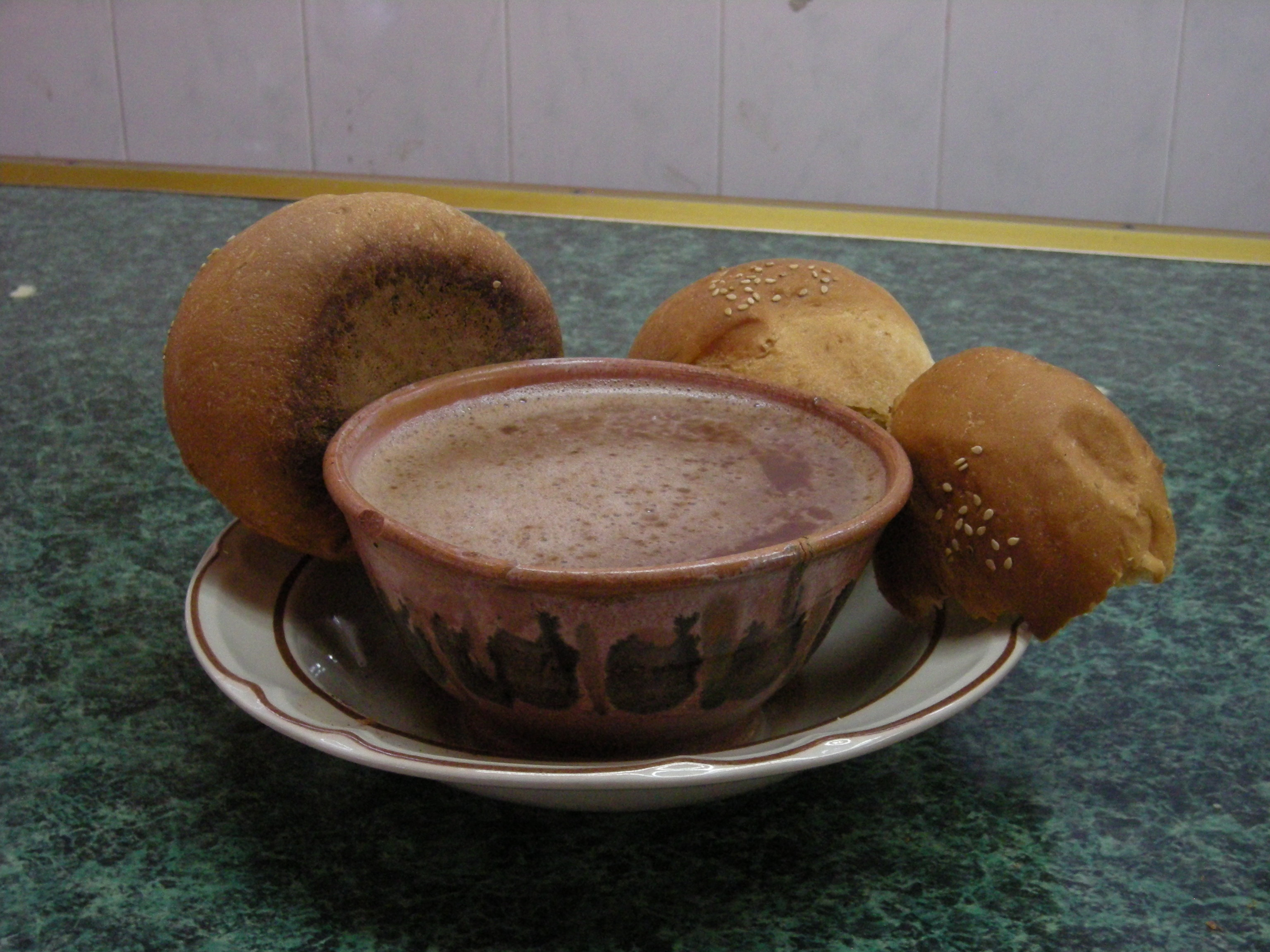
A cup of Oaxacan-style hot chocolate served in a traditional clay mug (with no handle) and pan de yema ('egg-yolk bread')

The city of Oaxaca has long been considered "Mexico's culinary capital." The most notable aspect of Oaxacan cuisine is its variety of moles, which are a type of complex sauce. Their origins go back to the melding of Spanish and Arabic food in Spain. After the Conquest, New World ingredients such as chile mulato, miltomate (a small whitish wild tomato), tomatoes, peanuts, avocado leaves, and chocolate were incorporated. While moles can be found in many parts of Mexico, Oaxaca has the greatest variety, including negro (black), colorado (red), coloradito (faint red), chichilo, verde (green), amarillo (yellow), and manchamanteles (lit. 'stainer of tablecloths'). They are sold in markets all over the city as a paste that is combined with water and simmered with a variety of meats.

Other notable foods sold in markets include bars of chocolate (primarily used for making hot chocolate), traditional breads, and chapulines (fried grasshoppers with chile). Street foods include tlayudas, which are large, slightly crispy corn tortillas piled high with ingredients such as grilled beef (called tasajo), cheese, tomatoes, avocados, onions, etc. Local drinks include those made with water, sugar, and a flavoring such as aguamiel (honey water), trocitos de melón (melon), horchata (rice), tuna batida (cactus fruit shake), and nuez (nuts), as well as local fruits such as chilacayota and guanábana. In nearby Tlacolula and Ejutla, an indigenous drink called tejate is still prepared and sold in the local market. Known here as the drink of the gods, it is prepared with corn, cacao, cacao flower, and the seed of the mamey fruit. As for alcoholic beverages, this area prefers mezcal, which like tequila is made from agave, but unlike tequila can be made from a variety of different species of the plant.

As in other areas in Mexico, chocolate has had special importance here since long before the Conquest. Aside from being a foodstuff, it was also used as medicine, and cacao seeds were used as money. The chocolate prepared in this city is well known within Mexico, as it is distinguished by being flavored with cinnamon, almonds, and sugar, and is usually prepared with hot water or milk, served in large coffee cups with a local sweet roll.

== Notable people ==
- Macedonio Alcalá, composer
- Carlos María de Bustamante, statesman
- Vinny Castilla, Major League Baseball player
- Porfirio Díaz
- Lila Downs, singer
- Ricardo Flores Magón
- Gerónimo Gil, Major League Baseball player
- Susana Harp, singer
- Benito Juárez, 26th and first Indigenous president of Mexico, 1858
- Nadia Yvonne López Ayuso, singer
- Rodolfo Morales, artist
- Alejandra Robles, singer & dancer
- María Sabina, shaman
- Rufino Tamayo, artist
- Francisco Toledo, artist
- José Vasconcelos

== Education ==
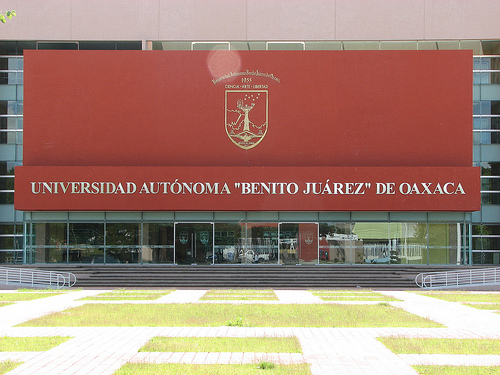
One of the main buildings on the campus of the Universidad Autónoma Benito Juárez de Oaxaca

The city of Oaxaca is home to several universities. It is the site of the Universidad Autónoma Benito Juárez de Oaxaca, which has buildings in various parts of the city. The most visible building is the Edificio Central de la Universidad (Central Building of the University), which is located in the historic downtown. It is in a building that originally housed the Sciences Institute. It was constructed between 1899 and 1901 in the European Romantic style, popular for academic institutions at the time. However, indigenous touches, such as the cresting over the portal, can be seen as well. This building houses the Department of Law and Social Studies and the gymnasium. Additionally, the Universidad de Mesoamérica has locations in the city. The Universidad Anáhuac Oaxaca was opened in 2000.

== Transportation ==
Oaxaca-Xoxocotlan Airport (IATA code OAX) is approximately 7 km south of the city centre. Most flights are to Mexico City for onward connection, but there are also flights to Huatulco, Cancún, Tuxtla Gutiérrez, and Tijuana. In addition, both American Airlines and United Airlines have nonstop flights between Oaxaca and their respective U.S. hubs in Dallas and Houston.

The city has separate first class and second class bus stations, offering services to most places within the state of Oaxaca, including the coastal resorts of Huatulco, Puerto Escondido, Puerto Ángel and Pinotepa Nacional, and also long-distance services to Puebla and Mexico City and other Mexican locations such as Veracruz. Several bus lines run in Oaxaca. The largest is TUSUG, a type of cooperative company. All of the drivers own their own buses and are aided by other drivers in purchasing new buses.

The major highways serving Oaxaca are Federal Highways 175 and 131, southwards to the Oaxacan coastal resorts; National Highways 190 and 125, southwest to Pinotepa Nacional; National Highways 190 and 130, to Mexico City; the autopista 150D/131D, offering a quicker route to Mexico City; and National Highway 175 north to the city of Veracruz.

== Surrounding towns ==
Several small towns surround the main city and are closely linked to it economically and culturally. Some of these towns are known for producing crafts associated with the three central valleys of Oaxaca. In these towns, one can see workshops producing traditional crafts, although most of their products are sold in the main city. Santa María Atzompa produces glazed, glass-inlaid pottery of green, while San Antonio Arrazola and San Martín Tilcajete make alebrijes, small painted wooden figures. San Bartolo Coyotepec is known for its barro negro pottery, and Teotitlán del Valle works with wool to make tapestry and rugs. These rugs are known for their colors and geometric designs, made traditionally with natural dyes; a wild marigold, pericon, that grows in the nearby mountains gives a gold yellow, cochineal, a native insect, gives reds and indigo, raised in the hotter regions of the state gives blues.

In addition, Oaxaca city and surrounding towns have market days, where one can visit the tianguis (open-air markets) set up for that day. There are markets on each day of the week. Monday in Miahuatlán is for buying daily staples, and Tuesday, in Ayoquezco is noted for wood furniture. On Wednesday, people head to Etla and Zimatlán for dairy products, especially cheese. Thursday is reserved for the two largest tianguis in Ejutla and Villa de Zaachila. On Friday, in Coyotepec, Jalietza and Ocotlán cotton textiles, embroidered blouses, corn-husk flowers, and glazed pottery from Atzompa are sold. Saturday is reserved for the main city of Oaxaca, and to finish, on Sunday, mezcal is sold in Tlacolula.

== Municipality of Oaxaca ==
As the municipal seat, the city of Oaxaca has governmental jurisdiction over the following communities: Arbolada Ilusión, Camino a San Luis Beltrán, Camino Ancho, Casas del Sol, Colonia Buena Vista, El Bajío (Rancho Guadalupe Victoria), El Silencio, Entrada de el Silencio, Gloria Antonio Cruz, Guadalupe Victoria, Guadalupe Victoria Segunda Sección (La Mina), Lachigulera, Las Salinas (El Arco Grande), Loma Bonita, Lomas Panorámicas, Los Ángeles, Los Ángeles Uno, Miravalle, Paraje Caballetiyo, Paraje el Cerrito, Paraje el Pando, Paraje la Canoa, Paraje la Loma, Paraje la Mina, Paraje la Rabonera, Paraje Pio V (Ojito de Agua), Paraje Tierra Colorada, Pueblo Nuevo Parte Alta, Rancho el Chilar, Rancho los Girasoles, San Bernardo, Solidaridad, and Viguera The municipality has a total area of 85.48 km^{2} and as of 2021 has a population of roughly 715,000 people who live in or around the Oaxaca city limits. While much of the indigenous population was either massacred or died from European diseases during the colonial era, sixteen different ethnic groups continue to inhabit the municipality. Spanish is the most commonly spoken language, but according to the 2005 census, there were 20,109 people who spoke an indigenous language, representing between seven and eight percent of the population.

The municipality is bordered by San Pablo Etla, San Antonio de la Cal, Santa Cruz Xoxocotlán, San Andrés Huayapam, San Agustín Yatareni, Santa Lucía del Camino, Santa María Atzompa and San Jacinto Amilpas. It is located in the Valley of Oaxaca in the Sierra Madre del Sur mountains, at 17°03′38″N 96°43′31″W near the geographic center of the state, and at an altitude of about 1550 m (5000 ft). The area is known as the three "Valles Centrales" (Central Valleys) region and is surrounded by thick forests of pine and holm oak.

== Twin towns – sister cities ==
Town	State/Region	Country
Antequera	Andalusia	Spain
Palo Alto	California	United States

== See also ==
- Árbol del Tule
- Oaxaca Community Foundation
