= Cantera (stone) =

Volcanic rock

Cantera stone is a quarried, volcanic rock that's mined in various regions of Mexico and Central America. Its name derives from the Spanish word for quarry. Its properties allow for detailed carving and cutting. It is used in hotels, shopping malls, office buildings, and custom homes throughout the world, and has stood for centuries in many cathedrals, haciendas and other buildings throughout Latin America. The stone can absorb air and humidity as well without expansion, so it can be used in wet areas. It is often used to create tables, fireplaces, wall tiles, pool areas, and columns.

The stone's color may vary depending on the impurities present in the stone of a particular region. The Cantera notably used in many of the buildings, walls, and roads of Oaxaca, Mexico is a distinct green color. This rock is formed by volcanic ash and dust. The ash is washed into a silt bed and combined with the lava, dirt, and stone already on the ground. This combination makes Cantera a porous and lightweight stone.
