= Sistema de Radiodifusoras Culturales Indígenas =

System of indigenous radio stations in Mexico

The Sistema de Radiodifusoras Culturales Indígenas (SRCI; English: Indigenous Cultural Broadcasting System) is a state-owned network of radio stations in Mexico. The radio stations it operates are community radio stations that aim to serve different sectors of the country's indigenous peoples. Pursuant to Article 4 of the Constitution, their mission is to strengthen the multicultural nature of the nation by promoting the use of 31 indigenous languages.

As the stations are owned by the federal government, they hold public concessions.

== History ==
The SRCI began operations in 1979 with the launch of XEZV-AM, "La Voz de la Montaña", in Tlapa de Comonfort, Guerrero. The network was initially managed by the National Indigenist Institute (INI), an agency of the federal government In 2003, the INI was dissolved and replaced by the National Commission for the Development of Indigenous Peoples (CDI), which consequently assumed control over the network. The CDI was in turn replaced by the National Institute of Indigenous Peoples (INPI) in late 2018.

Until 2019, the station was known as the Sistema de Radiodifusoras Culturales Indigenistas (Indigenist Cultural Broadcasting System).

== Stations ==
Locator map of SRCI stations

The SRCI operates 22 primary radio stations, most of which transmit on AM and eight of which are high-power FM stations. It also previously operated four 10-watt FM stations in Yucatán.

The 22 main stations transmit for an average of 12 hours a day, during daylight hours, covering 928 municipalities with high levels of indigenous inhabitants. The stations' potential audience comprises 5 million speakers of indigenous languages and more than 22 million Spanish speakers. They all broadcast an array of programming in both Spanish and the particular native languages spoken in the coverage area.

Four stations are AM-FM migrants: XHCARH, XHPET, XHTUMI, XHNKA. XHCARH and XHPET are required to maintain their AM frequencies because they are the only radio service for certain communities in its AM coverage area. The second and third stations reacquired their AM frequencies under new callsigns.

In 2016 and 2017, the CDI applied for and received FM radio stations that provide simulcast service for XETLA (XHPBSD-FM 95.9), XEGLO (XHGJO-FM 88.3), and XEQIN (XHSQB-FM 95.1).

On February 28, 2020, the INPI relaunched La Voz de los Chontales, which had been shuttered as XENAC in 1989 for political reasons, as XHCPBS-FM.

Call sign	Launched	Transmitting from	Coverage	Languages	Frequency
XEZV	10 May 1979	Guerrero (Tlapa de Comonfort)	Guerrero; Oaxaca; Puebla	Nahuatl; Mixtec; Tlapanec	800 AM
XETLA; XHPBSD	15 September 1982	Oaxaca (Tlaxiaco)	Oaxaca; Guerrero; Puebla	Mixtec; Triqui	930 AM; 95.9 FM
XEPUR	2 October 1982	Michoacán (Cherán)	Michoacán	Purepecha	830 AM
XETAR	11 November 1982	Chihuahua (Guachochi)	Chihuahua; Sinaloa; Durango	Tarahumara; Tepehuano	870 AM
XHPET; XEPET	29 November 1982	Yucatán (Peto)	Yucatán; Quintana Roo; Campeche	Yucatec Maya	105.5 FM; 730 AM
XEVFS	27 April 1987	Chiapas (Las Margaritas)	Chiapas; Guatemala	Tojolabal; Mam; Tseltal; Tsotsil; Popti	1030 AM
XEANT	28 September 1990	San Luis Potosí (Tancanhuitz de Santos)	San Luis Potosí; Hidalgo; Querétaro; Veracruz	Nahuatl; Pame; Wastek	770 AM
XEGLO; XHGJO	18 November 1990	Oaxaca (Guelatao de Juárez)	Oaxaca; Veracruz	Zapotec; Mixe; Chinantec	780 AM; 88.3 FM
XEZON	20 November 1991	Veracruz (Zongolica)	Veracruz; Oaxaca; Puebla; Tlaxcala	Nahuatl	1360 AM
XEOJN	14 December 1991	Oaxaca (San Lucas Ojitlán)	Oaxaca; Puebla; Veracruz	Mazatec; Cuicatec; Chinantec	950 AM
XEJMN	3 April 1992	Nayarit (Jesús María)	Nayarit; Jalisco; Durango; Zacatecas	Cora; Huichol; Tepehuano; Nahuatl	750 AM
XEJAM	5 May 1994	Oaxaca (Santiago Jamiltepec)	Oaxaca; Guerrero	Mixtec; Amuzgo; Chatino	1260 AM
XEQIN; XHSQB	15 June 1994	Baja California (San Quintín)	Baja California	Mixtec; Zapotec; Triqui	1160 AM; 95.1 FM
XECTZ	21 August 1994	Puebla (Cuetzalan)	Puebla; Hidalgo; Veracruz	Nahuatl; Totonac	1260 AM
XEXPUJ	22 January 1996	Campeche (Xpujil)	Campeche; Quintana Roo	Yucatec Maya; Ch'ol	700 AM
XEETCH	19 February 1996	Sonora (Etchojoa)	Sonora; Sinaloa; Chihuahua	Mayo; Yaqui; Guarijio	700 AM
XECOPA	17 July 1997	Chiapas (Copainalá)	Chiapas; Tabasco	Zoque; Tzotzil	1210 AM
XHTUMI; XETUX	12 May 1998	Michoacán (Tuxpan)	Michoacán; Edo. de México; Querétaro	Mazahua; Otomi	107.9 FM; 1010 AM
XHCARH; XECARH	1 August 1998	Hidalgo (Cardonal)	Hidalgo; Querétaro; Veracruz; San Luis Potosí	Ñha-ñhu; Nahuatl	89.1 FM; 1480 AM
XHNKA; XEFEL	15 June 1999	Quintana Roo (Felipe Carrillo Puerto)	Quintana Roo	Yucatec Maya	104.5 FM; 1030 AM
XETPH	8 November 2012	Durango (Santa María de Ocotán)	Durango, Nayarit	O'dam, Wixarika	960 AM
XHCPBS	28 February 2020	Tabasco (Nacajuca)	Tabasco	Yokot'an, Ch'ol, Ayapa Zoque	98.7 FM
XHCPCT	28 September 2021	Sonora (Vícam)	Sonora	Yaqui	89.3 FM

=== Defunct stations ===
Between 1982 and 1989, the SRCI system included a station at Nacajuca, Tabasco, XENAC-AM 1440. That station was shut down in 1989; the station was revived more than 30 years later as XHCPBS-FM.

The CDI also formerly held a trio of permits for low-power FM stations at three communities in Michoacán; these were not renewed.

== Programming ==
The stations' programming is eminently community-focused. Bilingual presenters attend inquiries from listeners, convey community and personal announcements, and promote various government assistance programs in the areas of health, education, human rights, etc. Traditional music is also a key component of the stations' broadcasts, and their recording collections, frequently gathered in the field, constitute an important cultural resource.
