= 700 AM =

AM radio frequency

The following radio stations broadcast on AM frequency 700 kHz: 700 AM is a United States clear channel frequency. WLW Cincinnati and KBYR Anchorage share Class A status of 700 kHz.

== In Argentina ==
- LV3 in Córdoba, Córdoba.

== In Canada ==
- CJLI in Calgary, Alberta - 50 kW daytime, 20 kW nighttime, transmitter located at 50.7047°N 114.241°W

== In Guatemala (Channel 17) ==
- TGVB in Guatemala City

== In Mexico ==
- XEDKR-AM in Guadalajara, Jalisco
- XEETCH-AM in Etchojoa, Sonora
- XEXPUJ-AM in Xpujil, Campeche

== In the United States ==
Stations in bold are clear-channel stations.

Call sign	City of license	Facility ID	Class	Daytime power (kW)	Nighttime power (kW)	Critical hours power (kW)	Unlimited power (kW)	Transmitter coordinates
KALL	North Salt Lake City, Utah	23480	B	50	10			40.891389°N 111.941389°W
**KBYR**	Anchorage, Alaska	49612	A				10	61.206944°N 149.922222°W
KDAZ	Albuquerque, New Mexico	51424	D	0.45	0.055			35.008611°N 106.714444°W
KGRV	Winston, Oregon	51181	B	23	0.47			43.144444°N 123.459167°W
KHSE	Wylie, Texas	133464	B	1.5	0.92			33.033611°N 96.298611°W
KMBX	Soledad, California	64041	B	2.5	0.7			36.464167°N 121.297778°W
KSEV	Tomball, Texas	9645	B	15	1			30.192778°N 95.594444°W
KXLX	Airway Heights, Washington	30036	B	10	0.34			47.608611°N 117.373611°W
WARB	Dothan, Alabama	23614	D	1.6				31.438611°N 85.289444°W
WDMV	Walkersville, Maryland	19235	D	5				39.4575°N 77.324167°W
**WLW**	Cincinnati, Ohio	29733	A				50	39.353056°N 84.325°W
WQVD	Orange-Athol, Massachusetts	51118	D	2.5				42.584722°N 72.281111°W
WZOO	Asheboro, North Carolina	20558	B	1		1		35.763889°N 79.834444°W
