= XEOJN-AM =

SRCI radio station in San Lucas Ojitlán, Oaxaca, Mexico

San Lucas Ojitlán, Oaxaca, Mexico; Mexico
- Broadcast area: Oaxaca, Puebla & Veracruz
- Frequency: 950 kHz
- Branding: La Voz de la Chinantla

Programming
- Format: Indigenous community radio

Ownership
- Owner: CDI – SRCI

History
- First air date: 14 December 1991
- Call sign meaning: San Lucas OJitláN

Technical information
- Class: B
- Power: 10,000 W
- Transmitter coordinates: 18°03′59.4″N 96°23′18.6″W

Links
- Webcast: XEOJN-AM
- Website: XEOJN-AM

XEOJN-AM (La Voz de la Chinantla – "The Voice of la Chinantla") is an indigenous community radio station that broadcasts in Spanish, Mazatec, Cuicatec and Chinantec from San Lucas Ojitlán, in the Mexican state of Oaxaca. It is run by the Cultural Indigenist Broadcasting System (SRCI) of the National Commission for the Development of Indigenous Peoples (CDI). The frequency is 950 kHz.
