= XHCPBS-FM =

Indigenous radio station in Nacajuca, Tabasco, Mexico

- Nacajuca, Tabasco, Mexico; Mexico
- Frequency: 98.7 MHz
- Branding: La Voz de los Chontales

Programming
- Format: Indigenous community radio

Ownership
- Owner: National Institute of Indigenous Peoples

History
- First air date: February 28, 2020
- Former call signs: XENAC-AM (1440 kHz, 1982–1989)
- Call sign meaning: (templated call sign)

Technical information
- Class: A
- ERP: 3 kW
- HAAT: 56.1 m (184 ft)
- Transmitter coordinates: 18°10′47.8″N 93°00′52.8″W

Links
- Webcast: XHCPBS-FM
- Website: XHCPBS-FM

XHCPBS-FM, known as La Voz de los Chontales, is an indigenous community radio station on 98.7 FM broadcasting in Spanish, Chontal Maya (yokot'an), Ch'ol and Ayapa Zoque from Nacajuca in the Mexican state of Tabasco. The station will form part of the Indigenous Cultural Broadcasting System (SRCI), part of the National Institute of Indigenous Peoples (INPI).

La Voz de los Chontales resumed broadcasting on February 28, 2020, after an earlier incarnation was shuttered in September 1989 for political reasons.

== History ==
=== XENAC ===
In 1982, XENAC-AM 1440 began broadcasting under the auspices of the National Indigenist Institute (INI). The station was part of a flurry of new indigenous radio openings in the early 1980s after the foundation of XEZV-AM in Tlapa de Comonfort, Guerrero, in 1979; XENAC was the second station established. At the time, XENAC broadcast with 500 watts and covered 47,000 listeners in seven municipalities.

In the late 1980s, XENAC fell victim to a concerted campaign by Tabasco governor Salvador Neme Castillo against a group influential in XENAC's operation, the Indigenous and Peasant Theatre Laboratory of Tabasco (Laboratorio de Teatro Campesino e Indígena de Tabasco). The governor was upset that the laboratory was not involved in Institutional Revolutionary Party political activities.

Beginning January 1, 1989, his first day in office, Governor Neme Castillo refused to fund the station, claiming that the station was broadcasting supposed "subversive proclamations against his government". He then proceeded to name Andrés Madrigal, a PRI politician not liked locally, as the Tabasco delegate to the INI. That September, a group of Chontal activists stormed the INI offices, demanding his removal. In response, Governor Neme Castillo ordered XENAC closed on September 29. Attempts to defray the situation failed, and the station's equipment, not protected by air conditioning, decayed in the tropical Tabasco climate. On September 18, 1990, the station was declared formally closed. Researcher José Manuel Ramos, who had been involved in the early days of the INI radio system, looked back on XENAC as the "ugly daughter" and "black sheep" of the indigenous radio network.

=== 30 years of silence ===
Political disagreements impeded any action to reopen XENAC throughout the 1990s. When Neme Castillo left office in 1992, his replacement, Manuel Gurría Ordóñez, attempted to begin dialogue with Nacajuca residents to turn over the station to them, but no action was taken. This was in large part because state officials wanted the station relocated to the state capital of Villahermosa, an idea resisted by the Chontal people. The 1994 election of Roberto Madrazo Pintado further put distance between the locals and the state government in Villahermosa, given that the residents in the area, primarily affiliated with the Party of the Democratic Revolution (PRD), felt Madrazo's election was fraudulent. Arturo Núñez Jiménez, running in the 2000 internal race to seek the PRI nomination for governor, promised that he would begin the necessary applications to reopen XENAC. Officials from the National Commission for the Development of Indigenous Peoples (CDI), the successor to the INI, visited Nacajuca in 2005 and found the former XENAC facilities completely unusable; the head of the SRCI at the time quoted the cost to reopen La Voz de los Chontales at US$400,000. In the late 2000s, efforts to get a new station up and running, this time on the FM band, shifted to the municipal government. In 2007, Nacajuca municipal president Avenamar Leyva Gómez announced plans to reopen XENAC as an FM radio station, to be known as "XHNAC-FM", on 99.9 MHz. However, none of the equipment acquired for the new station was put to use, in large part because the station's application for a permit languished at the various responsible authorities. In March 2014, new municipal president Pedro Landero López told a newspaper that the primary obstacle was its still-pending permit application at the Federal Telecommunications Institute (IFT). In the meantime, equipment was stolen from the abandoned facility, further hindering the municipality's efforts.

=== Return to the air ===
In 2018, however, an event occurred that would catalyze the process and bring the station back; the election of López Obrador as president. In August 2019, the National Institute of Indigenous Peoples, which had replaced the CDI in December 2018, announced that a new radio station would open in Nacajuca in February 2020; the station would broadcast in Chontal Maya as well as in Ch'ol and Ayapa Zoque, which has just five known living speakers.

On February 8, 2020, at an INPI event attended by President López Obrador, agency head Adelfo Regino Montes announced that the IFT had awarded the agency a concession to operate the station as XHCPBS-FM, its 22nd outlet. The award had been approved three days prior, just 23 days after the initial application was filed with the agency. The station's reconstruction is being facilitated by a donation of 1.5 million pesos from Pemex along with contributions from the municipality of Nacajuca. The station was originally to be reopened on February 21, coinciding with International Mother Language Day, and organizers announced their plans to have López Obrador officially reopen La Voz de los Chontales. However, the event was rescheduled for February 28 as part of a tour of the region by the president.
