= XETPH-AM =

SRCI radio station in Santa María de Ocotán, Durango

- Santa María de Ocotán, Durango, Mexico; Mexico
- Frequency: 960 AM
- Branding: Las Tres Voces de Durango

Programming
- Format: Indigenous community radio

Ownership
- Owner: INPI – SRCI

History
- First air date: 8 November 2012
- Call sign meaning: TePeHuán

Technical information
- Licensing authority: CRT
- Class: B
- Power: 5,000 W
- Transmitter coordinates: 22°57′13.2″N 104°35′59.0″W

Links
- Webcast: Listen live
- Website: ecos.inpi.gob.mx/xetph

XETPH-AM is a radio station located in Santa María de Ocotán, Durango. Broadcasting on 960 AM, XETPH is operated by the Sistema de Radiodifusoras Culturales Indígenas (SRCI) of the National Institute of Indigenous Peoples (INPI) and is known as Las Tres Voces de Durango (The Three Voices of Durango). It is the 21st station in the SRCI system of indigenous radio stations, coming to air on November 8, 2012 with programming in O´dam-audam, Nahuatl and Wixarika. It was the first new SRCI AM radio station since XENKA-AM signed on in 1995.
