= XECTZ-AM =

SRCI radio station in Cuetzalan, Puebla

Cuetzalan, Puebla, Mexico; Mexico
- Broadcast area: Puebla, Hidalgo & Veracruz
- Frequency: 1350 kHz
- Branding: La Voz de la Sierra Norte

Programming
- Format: Indigenous community radio

Ownership
- Owner: CDI – SRCI

History
- First air date: 21 August 1994
- Call sign meaning: CueTZalan

Technical information
- Class: B
- Power: 10,000 W (daytimer)
- Transmitter coordinates: 20°01′07″N 97°31′16″W

Links
- Webcast: XECTZ-AM
- Website: XECTZ-AM

XECTZ-AM (La Voz de la Sierra Norte – "The Voice of the Sierra Norte") is an indigenous community radio station that broadcasts in Spanish, Nahuatl and Totonac from Cuetzalan, in the Sierra Norte region of the Mexican state of Puebla. It is run by the Cultural Indigenist Broadcasting System (SRCI) of the National Commission for the Development of Indigenous Peoples (CDI).
