= XECOPA-AM =

SRCI radio station in Copainalá, Chiapas

- Copainalá, Chiapas, Mexico; Mexico
- Broadcast area: Chiapas & Tabasco
- Frequency: 1210 kHz
- Branding: La Voz de los Vientos

Programming
- Format: Indigenous community radio

Ownership
- Owner: CDI – SRCI

History
- First air date: 17 July 1997
- Call sign meaning: COPAinalá

Technical information
- Class: B
- Power: 5,000 watts (daytime only)
- Transmitter coordinates: 17°04′40.7″N 93°13′01.6″W

Links
- Webcast: XECOPA-AM
- Website: XECOPA-AM

XECOPA-AM (La Voz de los Vientos – "The Voice of the Winds") is an indigenous community radio station that broadcasts in Spanish, Zoque and Tzotzil from Copainalá, in the Mexican state of Chiapas. It is run by the Cultural Indigenist Broadcasting System (SRCI) of the National Commission for the Development of Indigenous Peoples (CDI). The station first came on the air on 17 July 1997.
