= XEQIN-AM =

SRCI radio station in San Quintín, Baja California

XEQIN-AM/XHSQB-FM
- San Quintín, Baja California; Mexico
- Broadcast area: Baja California
- Frequencies: 1160 kHz; 95.1 MHz
- Branding: La Voz del Valle

Programming
- Format: Indigenous community radio

Ownership
- Owner: CDI – SRCI

History
- First air date: 15 June 1994
- Call sign meaning: QuINtín; San Quintín Baja California

Technical information
- Licensing authority: CRT
- Class: B (AM); AA (FM)
- Power: 10,000 watts (AM, daytime only)
- ERP: 6,000 watts (FM)
- HAAT: 47 m (154 ft)
- Transmitter coordinates: 30°33′37″N 115°56′33″W

Links
- Webcast: XEQIN-AM
- Website: XEQIN-AM

XEQIN-AM/XHSQB-FM (La Voz del Valle – "The Voice of the Valley") is an indigenous community radio station that broadcasts in Spanish, Mixtec, Zapotec and Triqui from San Quintín in the Mexican state of Baja California.

It is run by the Cultural Indigenist Broadcasting System (SRCI) of the National Commission for the Development of Indigenous Peoples (CDI).

== History ==
XEQIN began broadcasting on 15 June 1994 on 1290 kHz with a power of 2,500 watts. In the first quarter of 2006, its transmission facility was upgraded to 10,000 watts and it relocated to 1160 kHz. It transmits daily from 05:00 to 19:00 hours, with a potential audience of 260,000 people. The indigenous-language speakers it targets are mostly migrant workers from the southern states of Oaxaca, Guerrero and Puebla. XEQIN-AM is a daytime-only station because it broadcasts on the United States clear-channel frequency of 1160 kHz, on which KSL is the dominant station.

In 2016, the CDI obtained an FM frequency to simulcast XEQIN, XHSQB-FM 95.1, which began test transmissions in January 2018.
