= Yucatec Maya language =

Mayan language spoken in Mexico and Belize

Yucatec Maya
- mayaʼ tʼaan maayaʼ tʼaan
- Pronunciation: [màːjaʔˈtʼàːn]
- Native to: Mexico, Belize
- Region: Yucatán, Quintana Roo, Campeche
- Ethnicity: Yucatec Mayas
- Native speakers: 800,000 including 775,000 in Mexico (2020 census)
- Language family: Mayan: Core Mayan; Yucatecan; Yucatec–Lacandon; Yucatec Maya

Official status
- Official language in: Mexico
- Regulated by: INALI

Language codes
- ISO 639-3: yua
- Glottolog: yuca1254
- ELP: Yucatec
- Location of Yucatec Mayan speaking areas on the Yucatán Peninsula

A Yucatec Maya speaker singing with a guitar.

Yucatec Maya (/ˈjuːkətɛk ˈmaɪə/ YOO-kə-tek MY-ə; Spanish: yucateco [ʝukaˈteko]), referred to by its speakers as mayaʼ or maayaʼ t’aan (pronounced [màːjaʔˈtʼàːn]), is a Mayan language spoken in the Yucatán Peninsula, including part of northern Belize. There is also a significant diasporic community of Yucatec Maya speakers in San Francisco, though most Maya Americans are speakers of other Mayan languages from Guatemala and Chiapas.

== Etymology ==
According to the Hocabá dictionary, compiled by American anthropologist Victoria Bricker, there is a variant name mayab tʼàan [majabˈtʼàːn], literally 'flat speech'). A popular, yet false, alternative etymology of Mayab is ma ya'ab or 'not many, the few', which derives from New Age spiritualist interpretations of the Maya. The use of "Mayab" as the name of the language seems to be unique to the town of Hocabá, as indicated by the Hocabá dictionary and is not employed elsewhere in the region or in Mexico, by either Spanish or Maya speakers. As used in Hocabá, "Mayab" is not the recognized name of the language, but instead a "nickname" derived from a common nickname for the region, the Mayab ("Mayab, the land of pheasant and deer"), the use of which emerged in the colonial period. This use may also derive from the title of a self-published book by a Yucatec scholar, Santiago Pacheco Cruz (1969). The meaning and origins of "Maya" as the name of the language (versus Mayab) and as the ethnic identity (ethnonym) are complex questions — see etymology and social history of the word as ethnic identity and name of the language in Restall (2004) and Restall and Gabbert (2017).

Linguists have added Yucatec to the name in order to clearly distinguish it from all other Mayan languages (such as Kʼicheʼ and Itzaʼ). Thus, the use of the term Yucatec Maya to refer to the language is scholarly or scientific nomenclature. Native speakers do not qualify the language as Yucatec, calling it "Maaya", "maayaʼ tʼàan", or "maasewal t'aan" (literally 'commoner language') in their language and simply (el) maya when speaking Spanish.

In the Mexican states of Yucatán, some parts of Campeche, Tabasco, Chiapas, and Quintana Roo, Yucatec Maya is still the mother tongue of a large segment of the population in the early 21st century. It has approximately 800,000 speakers in this region. There were an additional 2,518 speakers of Yucatec Maya in Belize as of the 2010 national census.

== History ==
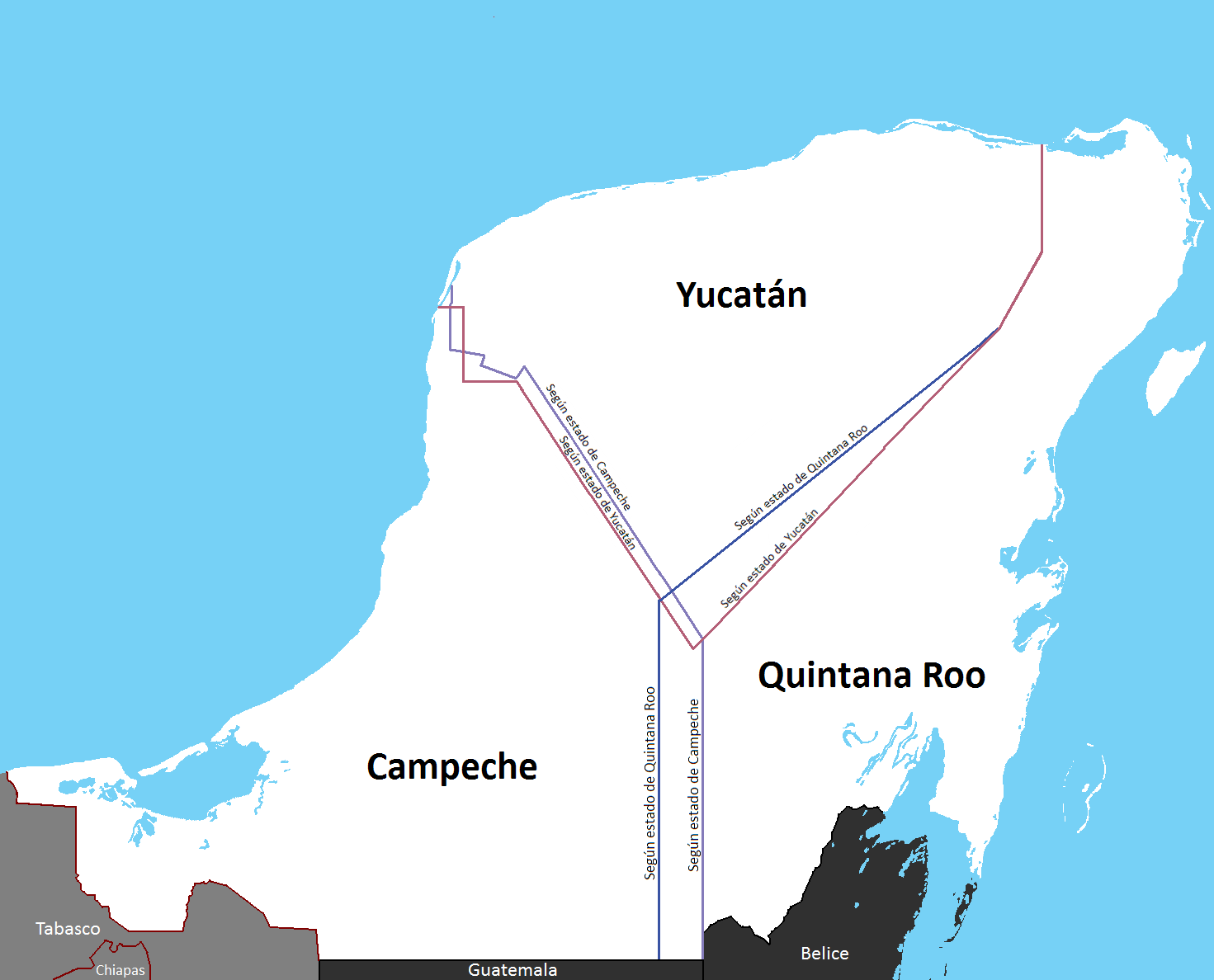
Yucatán Peninsula

Yucatec Maya forms part of the Yucatecan branch of the Mayan language family. The Yucatecan branch is divided by linguists into the subgroups Mopan-itza and Yucatec-Lacandon. These are made up by four languages:

- Itza
- Mopan
- Yucatec Maya
- Lacandon

All the languages in the Mayan language family are thought to originate from an ancestral language that was spoken some 5,000 years ago, known as Proto-Mayan.

The Maya had been in a stable decline when Spanish conquistadors arrived in 1517 AD. From 200 to 800 AD the Maya were thriving and making great technological advances. They created a system for recording numerals and hieroglyphs that was more complex and efficient than what had come before. They migrated northward and eastward to the Yucatán peninsula from Palenque, Jaina, and Bonampak. In the 12th and 13th centuries, a coalition emerged in the Yucatán peninsula among three important centers, Uxmal, Chichen Itza, and Mayapan. The society grew and the people were able to practice intellectual and artistic achievement during a period of peace. When war broke out, such progress was stalled. By the 15th century, the city of Tula had collapsed and was abandoned.

The Genoese explorer Christopher Columbus traded with Maya merchants off the coast of Yucatán during his expedition for the Spanish Crown in 1502, but he never made landfall. During the decade following Columbus's first contact with the Maya, the first Spaniards to set foot on Yucatán soil did so by chance, as survivors of a shipwreck in the Caribbean. The Maya ritually sacrificed most of these men, leaving just two survivors, Gerónimo de Aguilar and Gonzalo Guerrero, who somehow rejoined other Spaniards.

In 1519, Aguilar accompanied Hernán Cortés to the Yucatán island of Cozumel, and also took part in the conquest of central Mexico. Guerrero became a Mexican legend as father of the first Mestizo: by Aguilar's account, Guerrero "went native". He married native women, wore traditional native apparel, and fought against the Spanish.

Francisco de Montejo's military incursion of Yucatán took three generations and three wars with extended fighting, which lasted a total of 24 years.

As the Spanish colonists settled more areas, in the 18th century they developed the lands for large maize plantations and cattle farms. The elite lived in haciendas and exported natural resources as commodities. The Maya were subjects of the Spanish Empire from 1542 to 1821.

Language tree

During the colonization of the Yucatán peninsula, the Spanish believed that in order to evangelize and govern the Maya, they needed to reform Yucatec Maya. They wanted to shape it to serve their ends of religious conversion and social control.

=== Maya reducido ===
In the early colonial missionary period in Yucatán (ca. 1540–1700), Spanish missionaries undertook a project of societal transformation known as reducción (from Spanish reducir, meaning in this context to "put in order" or "civilize"). Missionaries translated Catholic texts from Spanish into Yucatec Maya and created neologisms to express Catholic religious concepts. The result of this process of reducción was Maya reducido, a semantically transformed version of Yucatec Maya. Missionaries attempted to end Maya religious practices and destroy associated written works. By their translations, they also shaped a language that was used to convert, subjugate, and govern the Maya population of the Yucatán peninsula. But Maya speakers appropriated Maya reducido for their own purposes, resisting colonial domination. The oldest written records in Maya reducido (which used the Roman alphabet) were written by Maya notaries between 1557 and 1851. These works can now be found in libraries and archives in the United States, Mexico, and Spain.

== Phonology ==
A characteristic feature of Yucatec Maya, like other Mayan languages, is the use of ejective consonants: /pʼ/, /tʼ/, /kʼ/. Often referred to as glottalized consonants, they are produced at the same place of oral articulation as their non-ejective stop counterparts: /p/, /t/, /k/. However, the release of the lingual closure is preceded by a raising of the closed glottis to increase the air pressure in the space between the glottis and the point of closure, resulting in a release with a characteristic popping sound. The sounds are written using an apostrophe after the letter to distinguish them from the plain consonants (tʼàan "speech" vs. táan "forehead"). The apostrophes indicating the sounds were not common in written Maya until the 20th century but are now becoming more common. The Mayan b is also glottalized, an implosive /ɓ/, and is sometimes written bʼ, but that is becoming less common.

Yucatec Maya is one of only three Mayan languages to have developed tone, the others being Uspantek and one dialect of Tzotzil. Yucatec distinguishes short vowels and long vowels, indicated by single versus double letters (ii ee aa oo uu), and between high- and low-tone long vowels. High-tone vowels begin on a high pitch and fall in phrase-final position but rise elsewhere, sometimes without much vowel length. It is indicated in writing by an acute accent (íi ée áa óo úu). Low-tone vowels begin on a low pitch and are sustained in length; they are sometimes indicated in writing by a grave accent (ìi èe àa òo ùu), though the 2014 INALI orthography uses no accent.

Also, Yucatec has contrastive laryngealization (creaky voice) on long vowels, sometimes realized by means of a full intervocalic glottal stop and written as a long vowel with an apostrophe in the middle, as in the plural suffix -oʼob.

=== Consonants ===
		Labial	Alveolar	Palatal	Velar	Glottal
Nasal		m ⟨m⟩	n ⟨n⟩			
Plosive	plain	p ⟨p⟩	t ⟨t⟩		k ⟨k⟩	ʔ ⟨ʼ⟩
Plosive	ejective	pʼ ⟨pʼ⟩	tʼ ⟨tʼ⟩		kʼ ⟨kʼ⟩	
Implosive		ɓ ⟨b⟩				
Affricate	plain		ts ⟨ts⟩	tʃ ⟨ch⟩		
Affricate	ejective		tsʼ ⟨tsʼ⟩	tʃʼ ⟨chʼ⟩		
Fricative			s ⟨s⟩	ʃ ⟨x⟩		h ⟨j⟩
Approximant		w ~ v ⟨w⟩ (Note: the letter ⟨w⟩ may represent the sounds [w] or [v]. The sounds are interchangeable in Yucatec Mayan although /w/ is considered the proper sound.)	l ⟨l⟩	j ⟨y⟩		
Flap			ɾ ⟨r⟩			

Some sources describe the plain consonants as aspirated, but Victoria Bricker states "[s]tops that are not glottalized are articulated with lung air without aspiration as in English spill, skill, still."

=== Vowels ===
In terms of vowel quality, Yucatec Maya has a straightforward five vowel system:

	Front	Back
Close	i	u
Mid	e	o
Open	a	

For each of these five vowel qualities, the language contrasts four distinct vowel "shapes", i.e. combinations of vowel length, tone, and phonation. In the standard orthography first adopted in 1984, vowel length is indicated by digraphs (e.g. "aa" for IPA [aː]).

Short, neutral tone	Long, low tone	Long, high tone	Creaky voiced ('glottalized, rearticulated'), long, high tone
pik 'eight thousand' [pik]	miis 'cat' [mìːs]	míis [míːs] 'broom; to sweep'	niʼichʼ [nḭ́ːtʃʼ] 'to get bitten'

In fast-paced speech, the glottalized long vowels may be pronounced the same as the plain long high vowels, so in such contexts ka’an [ká̰ːn] 'sky' sounds the same as káan [káːn] 'when?'.

=== Stress ===
Mayan words are typically stressed on the earliest syllable with a long vowel. If there is no long vowel, then the last syllable is stressed. Borrowings from other languages such as Spanish or Nahuatl are often stressed as in the original languages.

=== Debuccalization ===
An important morphophonological process in Yucatec Maya is the dissimilation of identical consonants next to each other by debuccalizing to avoid geminate consonants. If a word ends in one of the glottalized plosives /pʼ tʼ kʼ ɓ/ and is followed by an identical consonant, the final consonant may dispose of its point of articulation and become the glottal stop /ʔ/. This may also happen before another plosive inside a common idiomatic phrase or compound word. Examples: [majaɓˈtʼàːn] ~ [majaʔˈtʼàːn] 'Yucatec Maya' (literally, "flat speech"), and náak’- [náːkʼ-] (a prefix meaning 'nearby') + káan [ká̰ːn] 'sky' gives [ˈnáːʔká̰ːn] 'palate, roof the mouth' (so literally "nearby-sky").

Meanwhile, if the final consonant is one of the other consonants, it debuccalizes to /h/: nak [nak] 'to stop sth' + -kúuns [-kúːns] (a causative suffix) gives nahkúuns [nahˈkúːns] 'to support sb/sth' (cf. the homophones nah, possessed form nahil, 'house'; and nah, possessed form nah, 'obligation'), náach’ [náːtʃ] 'far' + -chah [-tʃah] (an inchoative suffix) gives náahchah [ˈnáːhtʃah] 'to become distant'.

This change in the final consonant is often reflected in orthographies, so [majaʔˈtʼàːn] can appear as maya’ t’àan, maya t'aan, etc.

=== Acquisition ===
Phonology acquisition is received idiosyncratically. If a child seems to have severe difficulties with affricates and sibilants, another might have no difficulties with them while having significant problems with sensitivity to semantic content, unlike the former child.

There seems to be no incremental development in phonology patterns. Monolingual children learning the language have shown acquisition of aspiration and deobstruentization but difficulty with sibilants and affricates, and other children show the reverse. Also, some children have been observed fronting palatoalveolars, others retract lamino-alveolars, and still others retract both.

Glottalization was not found to be any more difficult than aspiration. That is significant with the Yucatec Mayan use of ejectives. Glottal constriction is high in the developmental hierarchy, and features like [fricative], [apical], or [fortis] are found to be later acquired.

== Grammar ==
Like almost all Mayan languages, Yucatec Maya is verb-initial. Word order varies between VOS and VSO, with VOS being the most common. Many sentences may appear to be SVO, but this order is due to a topic–comment system similar to that of Japanese. One of the most widely studied areas of Yucatec is the semantics of time in the language. Yucatec, like many other languages of the world (Chinese, Kalaallisut, arguably Guaraní and others) does not have the grammatical category of tense. Temporal information is encoded by a combination of aspect, inherent lexical aspect (aktionsart), and pragmatically governed conversational inferences. Yucatec is unusual in lacking temporal connectives such as 'before' and 'after'. Another aspect of the language is the core-argument marking strategy, which is a 'fluid S system' in the typology of Dixon (1994) where intransitive subjects are encoded like agents or patients based upon a number of semantic properties as well as the perfectivity of the event.

== Orthography ==
The Maya were literate in pre-Columbian times, when the language was written using Maya script. The language itself can be traced back to proto-Yucatecan, the ancestor of modern Yucatec Maya, Itza, Lacandon and Mopan. Even further back, the language is ultimately related to all other Maya languages through proto-Mayan itself.

Yucatec Maya is now written in the Latin script. This was introduced during the Spanish Conquest of Yucatán which began in the early 16th century, and the now-antiquated conventions of Spanish orthography of that period ("Colonial orthography") were adapted to transcribe Yucatec Maya. This included the use of ⟨x⟩ for the postalveolar fricative sound (which is often written in English as ⟨sh⟩).

In colonial times a "reversed c" ⟨ɔ⟩ was often used to represent /t͡sʼ/ (the alveolar ejective affricate). This sound is now represented by ⟨tzʼ⟩ in the revised ALMG orthography and ⟨tsʼ⟩ in the INALI orthography.

== Examples ==
Yucatec Maya		English	
Standard pronunciation	Pronunciation of western Yucatán, northern Campeche and Central Quintana Roo	Normal translation	Literal translation
Bix a beel?	Bix a beej?	How are you?	How is your road?
Maʼalob, kux teech?		Good, and you?	Not bad, as for you?
Bey xan teen.		Same with me.	Thus also to me.
Tuʼux ka bin?		Where are you going?	Where do you go?
T(áan) in bin xíimbal.		I am going for a walk.	
Bix a kʼaabaʼ?		What is your name?	How are you named?
In kʼaabaʼeʼ Jorge.		My name is Jorge.	My name, Jorge.
Jach kiʼimak in wóol in wilikech.		Pleased to meet you.	Very happy my heart to see you.
Baʼax ka waʼalik?		What's up?	What (are) you saying? What do you say?
Mix baʼal.	Mix baʼaj.	Nothing. Don't mention it.	No thing.
Bix a wilik?		How does it look?	How you see (it)?
Jach maʼalob.		Very good.	Very not-bad
Koʼox!		Let's go! (For two people – you and I)	
Koʼoneʼex!		Let's go! (For a group of people)	
Baʼax a kʼáat?		What do you want?	
(Tak) sáamal.	Aasta sáamaj.	See you tomorrow.	Until tomorrow.
Jach Dios boʼotik.		Thank you. God bless you very much.	Very much God pays (it).
Wakax		Cow	Cow

== Use in modern media and popular culture ==
Yucatec-language programming is carried by the CDI's radio stations XEXPUJ-AM (Xpujil, Campeche), XENKA-AM (Felipe Carrillo Puerto, Quintana Roo) and XEPET-AM (Peto, Yucatán).

The 2006 film Apocalypto, directed by Mel Gibson, was filmed entirely in Yucatec Maya. The script was translated into Maya by Hilario Chi Canul of the Maya community of Felipe Carrillo Puerto, who also worked as a language coach on the production.

In the video game Civilization V: Gods & Kings, Pacal, leader of the Maya, speaks in Yucatec Maya.

In August 2012, the Mozilla Translathon 2012 event brought over 20 Yucatec Mayan speakers together in a localization effort for the Google Endangered Languages Project, the Mozilla browser, and the MediaWiki software used by Wikipedia and other Wikimedia projects.

Baktun, the "first ever Mayan telenovela," premiered in August 2013.

Jesús Pat Chablé is often credited with being one of the first Maya-language rappers and producers.

In the 2018 video game Shadow of the Tomb Raider, the inhabitants of the game's Paititi region speak in Yucatec Maya (while immersion mode is on).

The modern bible edition, the New World Translation of the Holy Scriptures was released in the Maya language in 2019. It's distributed without charge, both printed and online editions.

On December 4, 2019, the Congress of Yucatán unanimously approved a measure requiring the teaching of the Maya language in schools in the state.

Yucatec Maya is spoken by the fictional underwater kingdom of Talokan and its king Kukulkan in the 2022 film Black Panther: Wakanda Forever.

== See also ==
- Yucatec Maya Sign Language
