= XEPUR-AM =

SRCI radio station in Cherán, Michoacán

Cherán, Michoacán, Mexico; Mexico
- Broadcast area: Michoacán
- Frequency: 830 kHz
- Branding: La Voz de los Purépechas

Programming
- Format: Indigenous community radio

Ownership
- Owner: CDI – SRCI

History
- First air date: 2 October 1982
- Call sign meaning: PURépecha

Technical information
- Class: B
- Power: 8000 W
- Transmitter coordinates: 19°40′51.5″N 101°57′28.7″W

Links
- Webcast: XEPUR-AM
- Website: XEPUR-AM

XEPUR-AM (La Voz de los Purépechas; English: The Voice of the Purepechas) is an indigenous community radio station that broadcasts in Spanish and Purepecha from Cherán in the Mexican state of Michoacán. It is run by the Cultural Indigenist Broadcasting System (SRCI) of the National Commission for the Development of Indigenous Peoples (CDI).
