= XEVFS-AM =

Indigenous radio station in Las Margaritas, Chiapas

- San Sebastián/Las Margaritas, Chiapas, Mexico; Mexico
- Broadcast area: Chiapas; part of Guatemala
- Frequency: 1030 kHz
- Branding: La Voz de la Frontera Sur

Programming
- Format: Indigenous community radio

Ownership
- Owner: INPI – SRCI

History
- First air date: 27 April 1987
- Call sign meaning: Voz de la Frontera Sur

Technical information
- Class: B (AM)
- Power: 10,000 watts (AM, daytime only)
- Transmitter coordinates: 16°18′04.3″N 91°58′44.5″W

Links
- Webcast: XEVFS-AM
- Website: XEVFS-AM

XEVFS-AM (La Voz de la Frontera Sur – "The Voice of the Southern Border") is an indigenous community radio station that broadcasts in Spanish, Tojolabal, Mam, Tseltal, Tsotsil and Popti (otherwise known as Jakaltek) from Las Margaritas in the Mexican state of Chiapas. It is run by the Cultural Indigenist Broadcasting System (SRCI) of the National Institute of Indigenous Peoples (INPI).

== History ==
XEVFS signed on April 27, 1987.

The broadcast facilities of XEVFS were seized by the Zapatista National Liberation Army (EZLN) in their January 1994 uprising and used to transmit rebel messages.

In December 2016, the National Commission for the Development of Indigenous Peoples (CDI) obtained an FM frequency, XHSEB-FM 91.7, to convert XEVFS into an AM-FM combo. However, the station's technical proposals ran into problems precipitated by the primary locality designation of San Sebastián. The proposed coordinates to operate XHSEB-FM were 45 km from the locality of San Sebastián, far beyond the reference distance of 28 km for a Class AA radio station. As such, the INPI surrendered the concession in a letter dated March 19, 2019.
