= XEGLO-AM =

SRCI radio station in Guelatao de Juárez, Oaxaca, Mexico

XEGLO-AM XHGJO-FM

Guelatao de Juárez, Oaxaca, Mexico; Mexico
- Broadcast area: Oaxaca & Veracruz
- Frequencies: 780 AM; 88.3 FM
- Branding: La Voz de la Sierra Juárez

Programming
- Format: Indigenous community radio

Ownership
- Owner: CDI – SRCI

History
- First air date: 17 November 1990
- Call sign meaning: GueLataO; Guelatao de Juárez Oaxaca

Technical information
- Class: B (AM); AA (FM)
- Power: 10,000 W
- ERP: 6 kW
- Transmitter coordinates: 17°18′47.91″N 96°28′56.89″W

Links
- Webcast: Listen live
- Website: ecos.inpi.gob.mx/xeglo

XEGLO-AM/XHGJO-FM (La Voz de la Sierra Juárez – "The Voice of the Sierra Juárez") is an indigenous community radio station that broadcasts in Zapotec, Mixe and Chinantec from Guelatao de Juárez in the Mexican state of Oaxaca. It is run by the Cultural Indigenist Broadcasting System (SRCI) of the National Commission for the Development of Indigenous Peoples (CDI).

== History ==
On 21 March 1990, test transmissions began for XEGLO, at half power and only operating during the late morning and early afternoon. The station began full service on 17 November.

XHGJO-FM was awarded to the CDI in 2017.
