= XHTUMI-FM =

SRCI radio station in El Malacate, Tuxpan, Michoacán, Mexico

XHTUMI-FM XETUX-AM
- El Malacate, Tuxpan, Michoacán, Mexico; Mexico
- Broadcast area: Michoacán, Edo. de México, Querétaro
- Frequencies: 107.9 MHz; 1010 kHz
- Branding: La Voz de la Sierra Oriente

Programming
- Format: Indigenous community radio

Ownership
- Owner: CDI – SRCI

History
- First air date: 12 March 1998
- Call sign meaning: TUxpan MIchoacán

Technical information
- Power: (AM) 5,000 watts (day)
- ERP: (FM) 5,850 watts
- Transmitter coordinates: 19°31′56.7″N 100°28′36.4″W

Links
- Webcast: XHTUMI-FM
- Website: XHTUMI-FM

XHTUMI-FM/XETUX-AM (La Voz de la Sierra Oriente – "The Voice of the Eastern Mountains") is an indigenous community radio station that broadcasts in Spanish, Mazahua and Otomi from El Malacate, municipality of Tuxpan, in the Mexican state of Michoacán. It is run by the Cultural Indigenist Broadcasting System (SRCI) of the National Commission for the Development of Indigenous Peoples (CDI).

== History ==
XETUMI-AM 1010 came to air on March 12, 1998.

XETUMI was authorized in June 2012 move to FM as XHTUMI-FM 107.9. The AM station was reauthorized under a separate concession as XETUX-AM 1010.
