= XHPET-FM =

SRCI radio station in Peto, Yucatán

XEPET-AM / XHPET-FM

Peto, Yucatán; Mexico
- Broadcast area: Yucatán, Quintana Roo & Campeche
- Frequency: 730 kHz; 105.5 MHz
- Branding: La Voz de los Mayas

Programming
- Format: Indigenous community radio

Ownership
- Owner: INPI – SRCI

History
- First air date: 29 November 1982
- Call sign meaning: Peto

Technical information
- Class: B (AM); AA (FM)
- Power: 10,000 W (AM)
- ERP: 6,000 watts (FM)
- Transmitter coordinates: 20°07′32.5″N 88°56′11.5″W

Links
- Webcast: XEPET-AM
- Website: XEPET-AM

XEPET-AM/XHPET-FM (La Voz de los Mayas – "The Voice of the Mayas") is an indigenous community radio station that broadcasts in Spanish and Yucatec Maya from Peto (130 km south of the state capital Mérida) in the Mexican state of Yucatán.

It is run by the Cultural Indigenist Broadcasting System (SRCI) of the National Institute of Indigenous Peoples (INPI).

It originally started broadcasting on 29 November 1982 on 740 kHz, but relocated to 730 kHz in January 2001. The FM station was authorized on June 4, 2010.
