= XEJAM-AM =

SRCI radio station in Santiago Jamiltepec, Oaxaca, Mexico

Santiago Jamiltepec, Oaxaca, Mexico; Mexico
- Broadcast area: Oaxaca & Guerrero
- Frequency: 1260 kHz
- Branding: La Voz de la Costa Chica

Programming
- Format: Indigenous community radio

Ownership
- Owner: CDI – SRCI

History
- First air date: 5 May 1994
- Call sign meaning: Santiago JAMiltepec

Technical information
- Power: 10,000 W
- Transmitter coordinates: 16°16′42″N 97°49′12″W

Links
- Webcast: XEJAM-AM
- Website: XEJAM-AM

XEJAM-AM (La Voz de la Costa Chica – "The Voice of the Costa Chica") is an indigenous community radio station that broadcasts in Spanish, Mixtec, Amuzgo and Chatino from Santiago Jamiltepec in the Mexican state of Oaxaca. It is run by the Cultural Indigenist Broadcasting System (SRCI) of the National Commission for the Development of Indigenous Peoples (CDI).
