= XETLA-AM =

Indigenous radio station in Tlaxiaco, Oaxaca, Mexico

XETLA-AM/XHPBSD-FM

Tlaxiaco, Oaxaca, Mexico; Mexico
- Broadcast area: Oaxaca, Guerrero & Puebla
- Frequencies: 930 kHz; 95.9 MHz
- Branding: La Voz de la Mixteca

Programming
- Format: Indigenous community radio

Ownership
- Owner: CDI – SRCI

History
- First air date: 15 September 1982; 2018 (FM)
- Call sign meaning: TLAxiaco; PúBlico Barrio San Diego

Technical information
- Class: B (AM), AA (FM)
- Power: 5,000 Watts day 1,000 Watts night
- ERP: 6 kW (FM)
- HAAT: -120.1 m (FM)
- Transmitter coordinates: 17°14′50.7″N 97°41′52.9″W

Links
- Webcast: XETLA-AM
- Website: XETLA-AM

XETLA-AM/XHPBSD-FM (La Voz de la Mixteca – "The Voice of La Mixteca") is an indigenous community radio station that broadcasts in Spanish, Mixtec and Triqui from Tlaxiaco in the Mexican state of Oaxaca. It is run by the Cultural Indigenist Broadcasting System (SRCI) of the National Commission for the Development of Indigenous Peoples (CDI) and broadcasts from studios in the Barrio San Diego neighborhood of Tlaxiaco.
