= XEZON-AM =

SRCI radio station in Zongolica, Veracruz

- Zongolica, Veracruz; Mexico
- Frequency: 1360 AM
- Branding: La Voz de la Sierra de Zongolica

Programming
- Format: Indigenous community radio

Ownership
- Owner: National Institute of Indigenous Peoples
- Operator: Sistema de Radiodifusoras Culturales Indígenas

History
- First air date: 20 November 1991
- Call sign meaning: ZONgolica

Technical information
- Class: B
- Power: 10,000 W (daytimer)
- Transmitter coordinates: 18°38′42.3″N 97°00′41.5″W

Links
- Webcast: Listen live
- Website: ecos.impi.gob.mx

XEZON-AM (La Voz de la Sierra de Zongolica – "The Voice of the Sierra de Zongolica") is an indigenous community radio station that broadcasts in Spanish and Nahuatl from Zongolica, Veracruz, Mexico. It is run by the Sistema de Radiodifusoras Culturales Indígenas (SRCI) of the National Institute of Indigenous Peoples (INPI).

The station had planned to move to FM in 2018, but the migration to this band has not been made as of 2022, nor has a new concession been applied for or issued.
