= XHCPCT-FM =

La Voz del Río Yaqui (XHCPCT-FM)
- Vícam, Guaymas Municipality, Sonora; Mexico

Programming
- Format: Indigenous

Ownership
- Owner: National Institute of Indigenous Peoples

History
- First air date: September 28, 2021
- Call sign meaning: Templated call sign

Technical information
- Licensing authority: CRT
- Class: B
- ERP: 50 kW
- HAAT: 157.3 m (516 ft)
- Transmitter coordinates: 27°36′12″N 110°17′22″W

XHCPCT-FM, known as La Voz del Río Yaqui ("Voice of the Yaqui River"), is a public indigenous radio station on 89.3 FM located at Vícam in Guaymas Municipality, Sonora, Mexico. Owned by the National Institute of Indigenous Peoples (INPI) and part of its Sistema de Radiodifusoras Culturales Indígenas, the station serves Yaqui communities in central and southern Sonora, with the primary service area consisting of Vícam Pueblo, Pótam, Tórim, Huiribis, Rahum, and Belem in the municipality of Guaymas; Loma de Bácum in Bácum, and Loma de Guamúchil in Cajeme. These communities are northwest of Ciudad Obregón. The transmitter is in Vícam Pueblo, atop Cerro Onteme, and the studios are in Tórim.

== History ==
The Federal Telecommunications Institute (IFT) approved an application from the INPI to build the station on July 7, 2021, nearly five months after the INPI filed for the station on February 22. The IFT approved the technical parameters on September 24, days before the station went on air on September 28. The launch is correlated with a "Justice Plan for the Yaqui People" between the federal government and tribal communities as reparation for past disinvestment and injustices over Mexico's history. The location of the station's facilities was determined by consultation with seven of the eight localities served (Loma de Bácum has not cooperated with the government plan).
