= XEANT-AM =

SRCI radio station in Tancanhuitz de Santos, San Luis Potosí

- Tancanhuitz de Santos, San Luis Potosí, Mexico; Mexico
- Broadcast area: San Luis Potosí, Hidalgo, Querétaro & Veracruz
- Frequency: 770 kHz
- Branding: La Voz de las Huastecas

Programming
- Format: Indigenous community radio

Ownership
- Owner: CDI – SRCI

History
- First air date: 28 September 1990
- Former frequencies: 1070 kHz (1990–2005)
- Call sign meaning: Pedro ANTonio Santos, San Luis Potosí

Technical information
- Licensing authority: CRT
- Class: B
- Power: 10,000 W
- Transmitter coordinates: 21°38′02.2″N 98°57′15.0″W

Links
- Webcast: XEANT-AM
- Website: XEANT-AM

XEANT-AM (La Voz de las Huastecas – "The Voice of the Huastecas") is an indigenous community radio station that broadcasts in Spanish, Nahuatl, Pame and Huastec (Tének) from Tancanhuitz de Santos in the Mexican state of San Luis Potosí. It is run by the Cultural Indigenist Broadcasting System (SRCI) of the National Commission for the Development of Indigenous Peoples (CDI).

XEANT's radio programming has been studied as an example of decolonization and the promotion of traditional knowledge and values.

XEANT transmitter is located in San José Pequetzén.

== Programming ==
A 2017 annual work report for XEANT highlighted the Plaza Pública (Public Plaza) radio show, which is produced in Tének or Nahuatl each weekend in a different community and includes music by traditional Huapango trios. According to the report, Plaza Pública has been so popular that many local community assemblies have submitted petitions to have the show produced in their communities.

In 2020 the station broadcast information about COVID-19 prevention in Nahuatl and Tének.
