= Cuetzalan del Progreso (municipality) =

Coordinates: 20°02′N 97°31′W

- Municipality
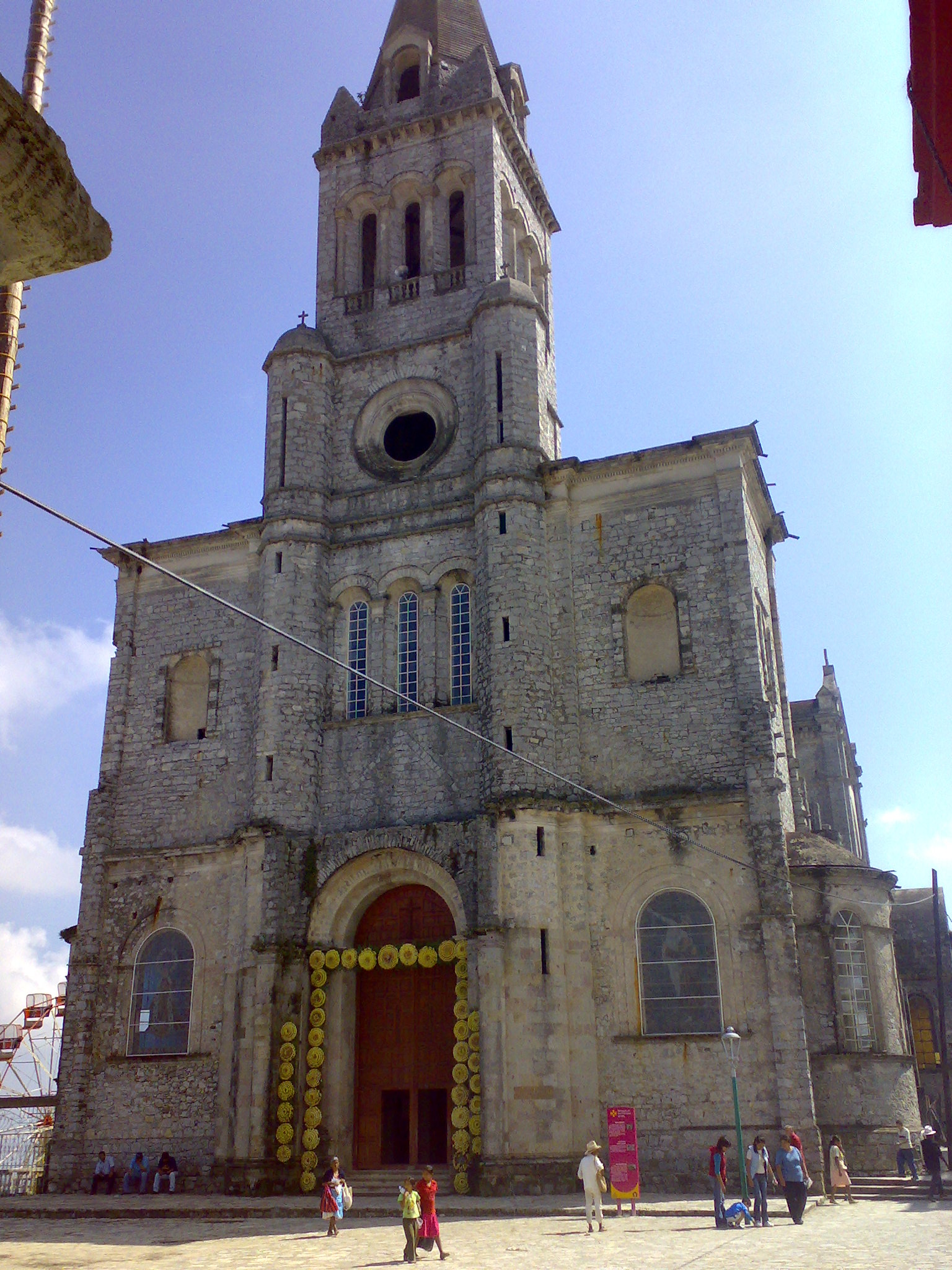

- Seal

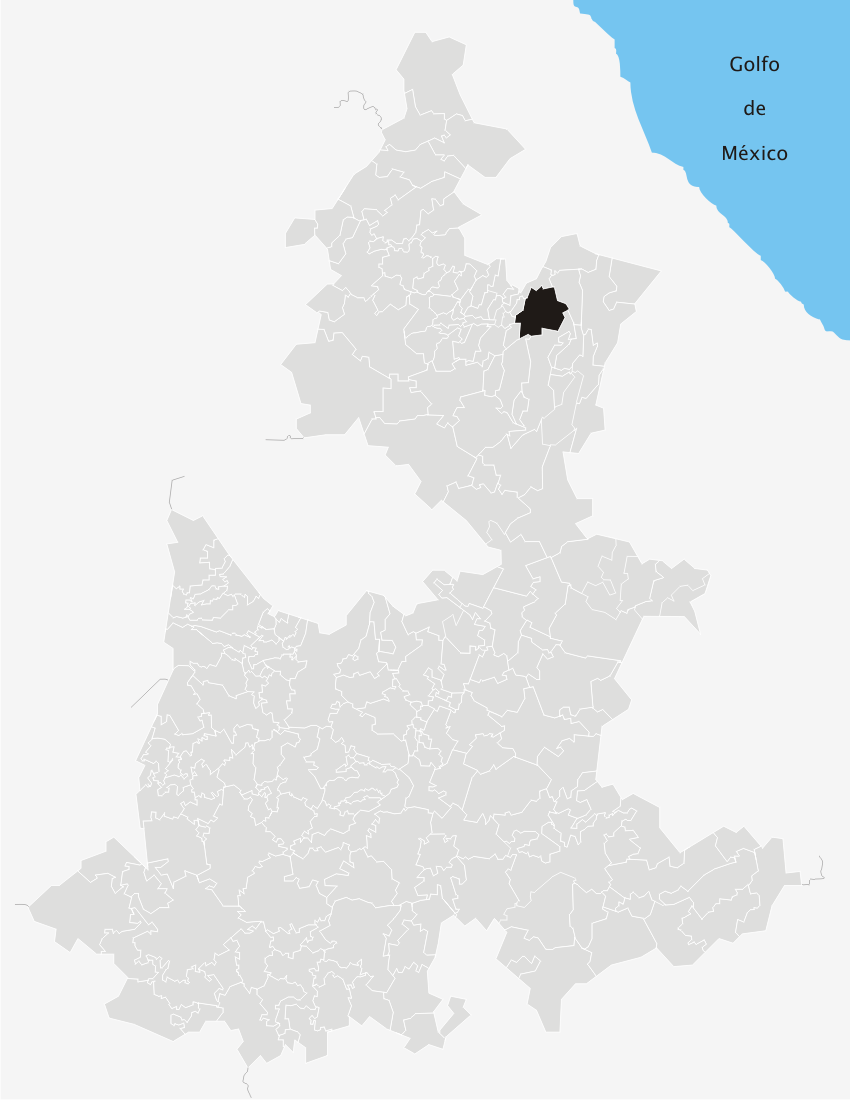
- Location of the municipality in Puebla
- Country: Mexico
- State: Puebla
- Seat: Cuetzalan

Population (2020)
  - Total: 49,864
- Time zone: UTC-6 (Zona Centro)

Cuetzalan del Progreso is a municipality in the Mexican state of Puebla.
