= Purépecha language =

Indigenous language spoken in parts of Mexico

Purépecha
- Tarascan
- Pʼurhépecha
- Pronunciation: [pʰuˈɽepet͡ʃa]
- Native to: Mexico
- Region: Michoacán
- Ethnicity: Purépecha
- Native speakers: 142,469 (2020 census)
- Language family: Language isolate

Language codes
- ISO 639-3: Either: tsz – Eastern pua – Western
- Glottolog: tara1323
- ELP: Purepecha
- Distribution of Purépecha in Mexico. Green indicates historical language homeland and red is modern-day speakers.

Purépecha (autonym: Pʼurhépecha [pʰuˈɽepet͡ʃa] or Phorhé(pecha)), often called Tarascan (Spanish: Tarasco), a term coined by Spanish settlers that can be seen as pejorative to some, is a language isolate or small language family that is spoken by some 140,000 Purépecha in the highlands of Michoacán, Mexico.

Purépecha was the main language of the pre-Columbian Purépecha Empire and became widespread in the region during its heyday in the late post-Classic period. The small town of Purepero got its name from the indigenous people who lived there.

Even though it is spoken within the boundaries of Mesoamerica, Purépecha does not share many of the traits defining the Mesoamerican language area, suggesting that the language is a remnant of an indigenous substrate that existed several thousands of years ago before the migration of speakers that contributed to the formation of the sprachbund, or alternatively is a relatively new arrival to the area.

== Classification ==
Purépecha has long been classified as a language isolate unrelated to any other known language. That judgement is repeated in Lyle Campbell's authoritative classification. Joseph Greenberg assigned it to the Chibchan language family, but like the rest of his American classification, that proposal is rejected by specialists.

There are a number of dialects, which SIL International divides into two languages, but Campbell (1997) considers Purépecha to be a single language. The government of Mexico recognizes three dialectal variants: Lacustrine (spoken in areas close to Lake Pátzcuaro), Sierran or Meseta (spoken in the Highlands of northwestern Michoacán) and Cañada (spoken in the Cañada de los Once Pueblos region).

== Demography ==
The language is spoken mostly in rural communities in the highlands of Michoacán. The former center of the Tarascan State was around Lake Pátzcuaro and remains an important center of the Purépecha community.

Ethnologue counts Purépecha as two languages: a central language, spoken by approximately 40,000 people (2005) around Pátzcuaro, and a western highland language, spoken by 135,000 speakers (2005) around Zamora, Los Reyes de Salgado, Paracho de Verduzco, and Pamatácuaro, all of which are in the vicinity of the volcano Parícutin. Recent migration has formed communities of speakers in the cities of Guadalajara, Tijuana and Mexico City and in the United States. The total population of speakers is rising (from 58,000 in 1960 to 96,000 in 1990 and 120,000 in 2000), but the percentage of speakers relative to non-speakers is falling, and the degree of bilingualism is rising, which makes it an endangered language. Fewer than 10% of speakers are now monolingual.

== History ==
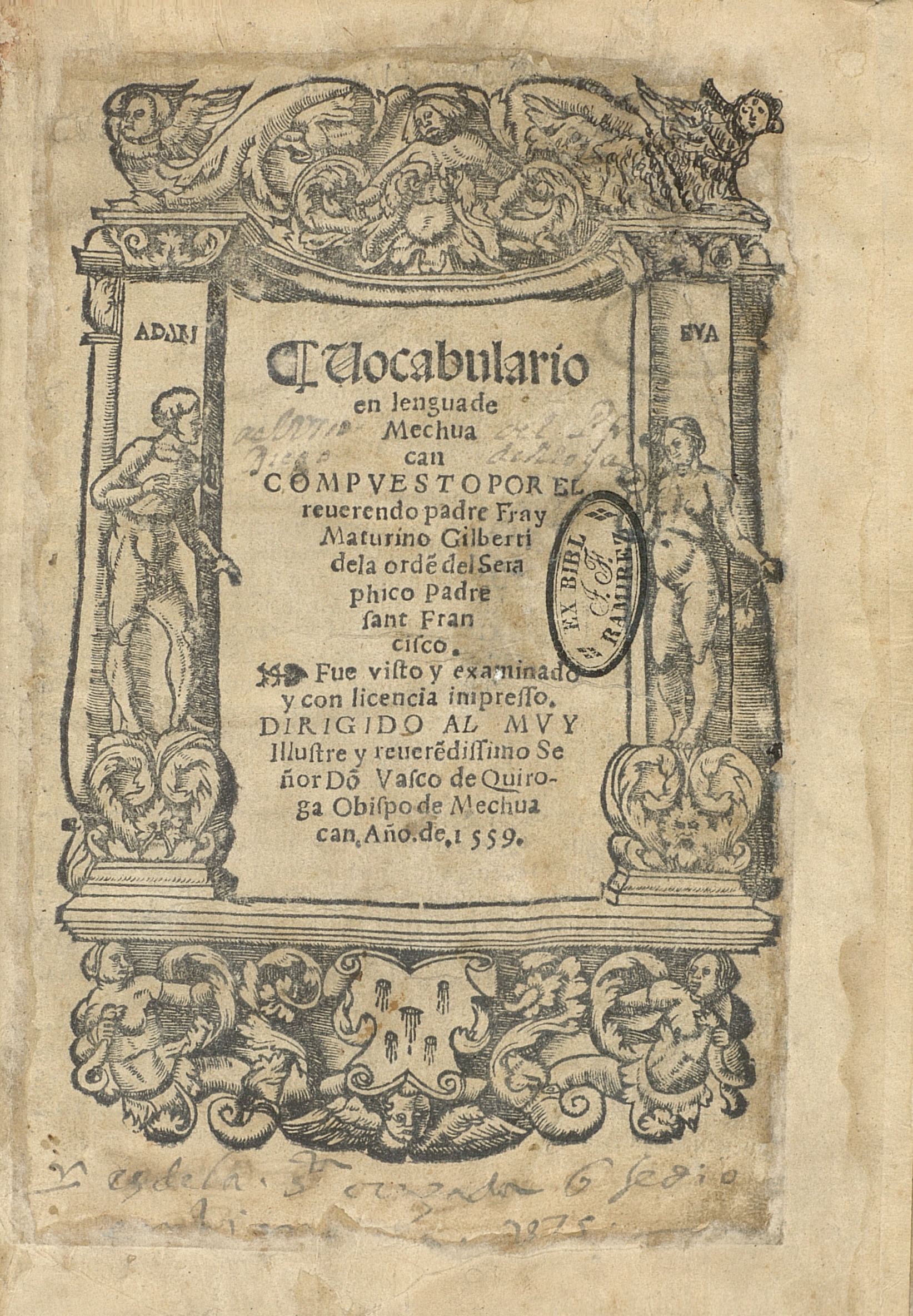
Dictionary of the Mechuacan (Michoacán, Tarascan) language, Fray Maturino Gilberti, 1559

The Purépecha are known to have migrated from elsewhere to their current location, as their tradition includes stories of having traveled from the Pacific Ocean to their current locations. Ethnohistorical accounts mention them as a people dwelling in the same region of Michoacán they live in now as early as the 13th century. According to the Relación de Michoacán, the communities around Lake Pátzcuaro were gathered into the strong Purépecha State by the leader of the Uacúsecha group of Purépecha speakers, Tariácuri. Around 1300, he undertook the first conquests of other areas and installed his nephews Hiripan and Tangáxoan as lords of Ihuatzio and Tzintzuntzan respectively while he himself ruled from the city of Pátzcuaro. By the time of the death of Tariácuri, in around 1350, his lineage was in control of all the major centers around Lake Pátzcuaro.

His nephew Hiripan continued the expansion into the area surrounding Lake Cuitzeo. In 1460 the Purépecha State reached the Pacific Coast at Zacatula, advanced into the Toluca Valley, and also, on the northern rim, reached into the present-day state of Guanajuato. In the 15th century, the Purépecha state was at war with the Aztecs. Many Nahua peoples who had lived side by side with Purépecha-speakers were relocated outside of the Tarascan frontiers, and Otomi-speakers fleeing the Aztec expansion resettled on the border between the two polities. That created a fairly homogeneous area of Purépecha speakers, with no other languages spoken in the core area around Lake Pátzcuaro.

Prayer book in the language by J. J. Apolonio Maya dated 1849 (click to browse)

During the Spanish conquest of the Aztec Empire, the Purépecha State was at first peacefully incorporated into the realm of New Spain, but with the killing of Cazonci Tangaxuan II by Nuño de Guzmán, the relation became one of Spanish dominance by force. Exceptions were the hospital communities of Vasco de Quiroga, such as Santa Fé de la Laguna, where Purépecha could live with a degree of protection from Spanish domination. Through Spanish friars, the Purépecha learned to write in the Latin script, and Purépecha became a literary language in the early colonial period. There is a body of written sources in Purépecha from the period, including several dictionaries, confessionaries, and land titles. Among the most important colonial works are the grammar (1558) and dictionary (1559) of Fray Maturino Gilberti, and the grammar and dictionary (1574) by Juan Baptista de Lagunas

From ca. 1700, the status of Purépecha changed, and throughout the 20th century, the Mexican government pursued a policy of Hispanicization. Speakers of indigenous languages were actively encouraged to abandon their languages in favor of Spanish. However, in accord with international changes in favor of recognizing the linguistic rights of indigenous peoples and promoting multiculturalism in colonial states, the Congress of the Union of Mexico approved the General Law of Linguistic Rights of the Indigenous Peoples in 2003, giving Purépecha and Mexico's other indigenous languages official status as "national languages."

== Orthography ==
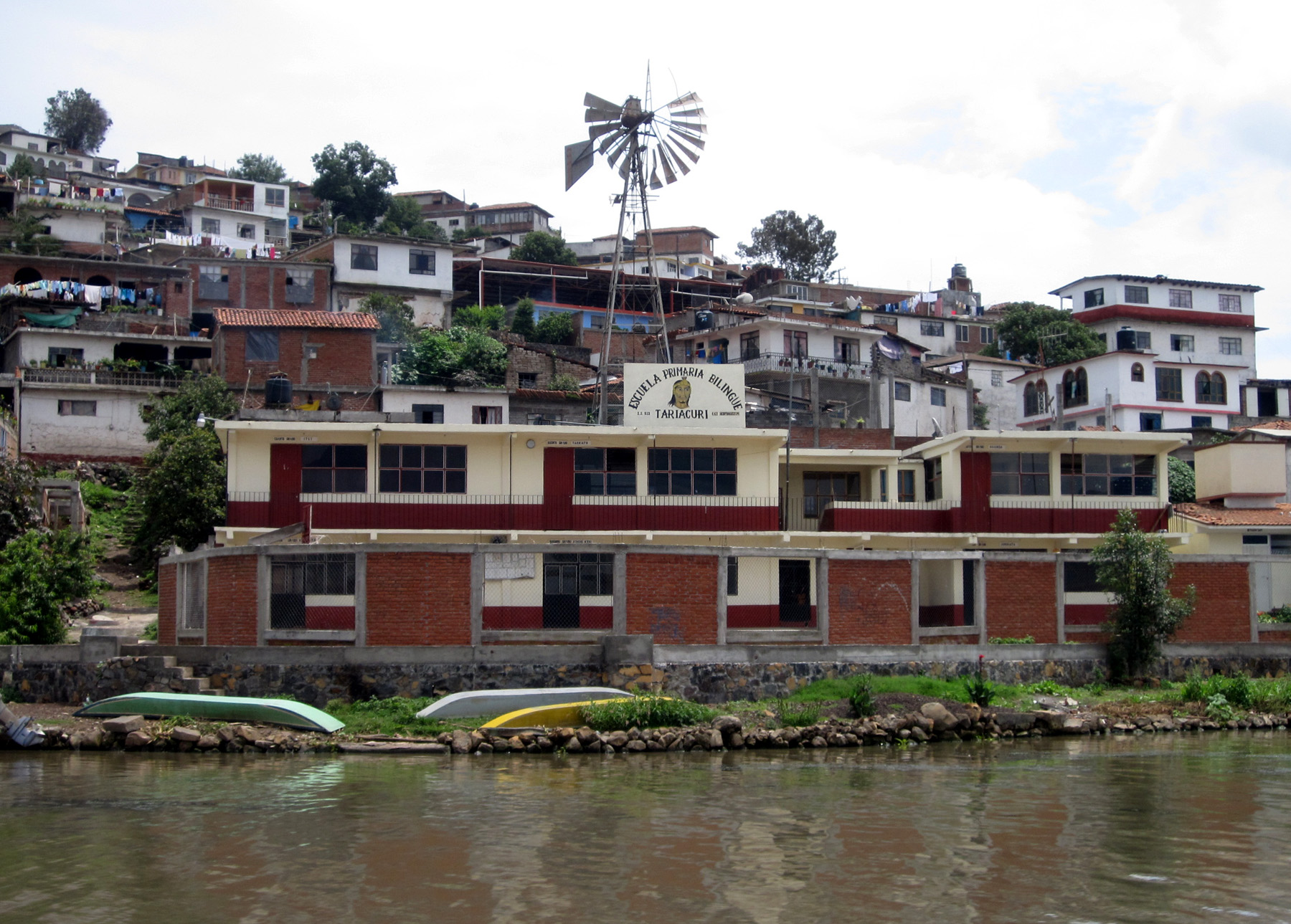
A bilingual Purépecha/Spanish school in the Purépecha community of Janitzio, Michoacán. Since Mexico's 2000 indigenous language law, indigenous languages like Purépecha share the same status as Spanish in the areas in which they are spoken, and many schools offer the curriculum in indigenous languages.

The official alphabet is the PʼURHEPECHA JIMBO KARARAKUECHA (Purépecha Alphabet):

- a b ch chʼ d e g i ï j k kʼ m n nh o p pʼ r rh s t tʼ ts tsʼ u x.

The letters b, d, g occur in spelling only after m, n: mb, nd, ng, which reflects the pronunciation of p, t, k after nasal consonants.

== Phonology ==
In all dialects of Purépecha, the stress accent is phonemic. As in Spanish orthography, a stressed syllable is indicated by the acute accent. Minimal pairs are formed:

- karáni 'write' — kárani 'fly'
- p'amáni 'wrap it' — p'ámani 'touch a liquid'

Usually, the second syllable of the word is stressed, but occasionally, it is the first.

The phonemic inventory of the Tarécuato dialect is presented below. It differs from other dialects in having a velar nasal phoneme. The table of phonemes uses the International Phonetic Alphabet (IPA) and also gives the alphabet equivalents, enclosed in angle brackets, if it is not obvious.

=== Vowels ===
	Front	Central	Back
Close	i	ɨ ⟨ï⟩	u
Mid	e		o
Open		ɑ ⟨a⟩	

The two mid vowels /e, o/ are uncommon, especially the latter.

The high central vowel is almost always after /s/ or /ts/ and is then almost an allophone of /i/.

The final vowel of a word is usually voiceless (whispered) or deleted except before a pause.

Vowel clusters are very rare except for sequences that are generated by adding grammatical suffixes like the plural -echa or -icha, the copula -i, or the genitive -iri. Vowel clusters are usually not the first two sounds of a word.

=== Consonants ===
Purépecha is one of the few languages in the Mesoamerica without a phonemic glottal stop (a distinction shared by the Huave language and by some Nahuan languages). It lacks any laterals ('l'-sounds). However, in the speech of many young Spanish-Purépecha bilinguals, the retroflex rhotic has been replaced by [l] under the influence of Spanish.

There are distinct series of non-aspirated and aspirated consonants and affricate consonants; in the spelling aspiration is noted by an apostrophe. There are two rhotics ('r'-sounds, one of them being retroflex).

		Bilabial	Alveolar	Postalveolar or palatal	Velar	
		Bilabial	Alveolar	Postalveolar or palatal	plain	labialised
Nasal		m	n		ŋ ⟨nh⟩	
Plosive	plain	p	t		k	kʷ ⟨ku⟩
Plosive	aspirated	pʰ ⟨p'⟩	tʰ ⟨t'⟩		kʰ ⟨k'⟩	kʷʰ ⟨k'u⟩
Affricate	plain		ts	tʃ ⟨ch⟩		
Affricate	aspirated		tsʰ ⟨ts'⟩	tʃʰ ⟨ch'⟩		
Fricative			s	ʃ ⟨x⟩	x ⟨j⟩	
Rhotic			r	ɽ ⟨rh⟩		
Approximant				j ⟨i⟩		w ⟨u⟩

The official orthography does not have distinct representations for the four phonemes /kʷ/, /kʷʰ/, /w/, /j/. It uses the letter ⟨i⟩ for both /i, j/ and the letter ⟨u⟩ for both /u, w/, but both semivowels are fairly rare. When ⟨k⟩ or ⟨k'⟩ is followed by ⟨u⟩ and another vowel letter, the sequence virtually always represents the labio-velar phonemes.

Intervocally, aspirated consonants become pre-aspirated. After nasals, aspirated consonants lose their aspiration and unaspirated consonants become voiced.

== Grammar ==
=== Typology ===
Purépecha is an agglutinative language, but sound change has led to a certain degree of fusion. It is sometimes considered a polysynthetic language because of its complex morphology and frequent long words. Unlike most other languages that are considered polysynthetic, it has no noun compounding or incorporation. The language is exclusively suffixing and has a large number of suffixes (as many as 160) and clitics. The verb distinguishes 13 aspects and 6 modes. The language is double-marking in the typology of Johanna Nichols, as it marks grammatical relations on both the dependent phrases and phrasal heads.

The language has both grammatical case and postpositions. The case system distinguishes nominative, accusative, genitive, comitative, instrumental, and locative cases, but there are also many nominal derivational affixes. Word order is flexible, and the basic word order has been described as either SVO or SOV. However, most authors note that other word orders are frequently used for pragmatic purposes such as focus or topic tracking.

=== Nouns ===
Nouns are inflected by the basic formula Noun + Number + Case.

The language distinguishes between plural and unspecified numbers, with no dedicated singular form.

Plurals formed by the suffix -echa/-icha or -cha.

- kúmi-wátsï 'fox' – kúmi-wátsïcha 'foxes'
- iréta 'town' – irétaacha 'towns'

warhíticha tepharicha maru
women-PL fat-PL some
'some fat women'

The nominative case is unmarked. The accusative case (also called the objective case) is used to mark direct and sometimes indirect objects and is marked by the suffix -ni:

Pedrú pyásti tsúntsuni
Pedrú pyá-s-ti tsúntsu-ni
Pedro buy-PFV-3P pot-ACC
'Pedro bought the pot'

The genitive case is marked by -ri -eri:

imá wárhitiri wíchu
imá wárhiti-ri wíchu
that woman-GEN dog
'that woman's dog'

The locative case is marked by -rhu, -o

kúntaati Maríao
ku-nta-a-ti María-o
meet-ITER-FUT-3IND Maria-LOC
'He'll meet him at María's place'

The instrumental case is marked by the particle jimpó or the suffix -mpu

jiríkurhniniksï tsakápu k'éri má jimpó
jiríkurhi-ni=ksï tsakápu k'éri má jimpó
hide-INF-3PL rock big one INS
'They hid behind some big rocks'

ampémpori ánchikuarhiwa
ampé-mpu=ri anchikuarhi-wa-∅
what-INS work-FUT-3SG
'What will he/she work with?'

The comitative case is marked by the particle jinkóni or the suffix -nkuni

apóntini warhíti má jinkóni
apónti-ni wárhiti má jinkóni
sleep-INF woman one COM
'to sleep with a woman'

xi niwákani imánkuni
xi ni-wa-ka-=ni imá-nkuni
I go-FUT-1st/2nd-1P DEM-COM
'I'll go with him/her'

Discourse-pragmatic focus on a noun or noun phrase is indicated by the clitic -sï.

Ampésï arhá Pedrú?
ampé-sï arh-∅-∅-á Pedrú
what-FOC eat-PFV-INTERR Pedro
'What did Pedro eat?'

kurúchasï atí.
Kurúcha-sï a-∅-tí
fish-FOC eat-PFV-3P
'he ate fish' (i.e., 'fish is what he ate')

=== Verbs ===
Verbs inflect for aspects and moods as well as for person and number of the subject and the object. There are also a number of suffixes expressing shape, position, or body parts that affect or are affected by the verbal action.

Transitivity is manipulated by suffixes forming transitive verbs with applicative or causative meaning or intransitives with passive or inchoative meanings.

== Media ==
Purépecha-language programming is broadcast by the radio station XEPUR-AM, located in Cherán, Michoacán. It is a project of the National Commission for the Development of Indigenous Peoples.

== Toponyms ==
- Acuitzio – "Place of the snakes"
- Cuerámaro – "Coat of the swamps"
- Cóporo – "Over the big road"
- Cupareo – "Crossroads"
- Tzintzuntzan – "Place of hummingbirds"
- Zurumuato – "Place in straw hill"

== Bibliography ==
- Campbell, Lyle (1997). American Indian Languages: The Historical Linguistics of Native America. Oxford Studies in Anthropological Linguistics, no. 4. William Bright (series general ed.) (OUP paperback ed.). New York: Oxford University Press. ISBN 978-0-19-509427-5. OCLC 32923907.
- Capistrán, Alejandra (2002). "Variaciones de orden de constituyentes en p'orhépecha". In Levy, Paulette (ed.). Del cora al maya yucateco: estudios lingüísticos sobre algunas lenguas indígenas mexicanas (in Spanish). Mexico City: UNAM.
- Chamoreau, Claudine (2003b). "Purépecha de Jarácuaro, Michoacán". Archivo de Lenguas Indígenas de México (in Spanish). 25. Mexico City: El Colegio de México.
- Chamoreau, Claudine (2003). Parlons Purépecha (in French). Paris: L'Harmattan. ISBN 978-2-7475-4357-6.
- Chamoreau, Claudine (2009). Hablemos Purépecha (in Spanish). Morelia, Mexico: Universidad Intercultural Indígena de Michoacán. ISBN 978-607-424-042-9.
- De Wolf, Paul (1989). Estudios Lingüísticos sobre la lengua P'orhé (in Spanish). Mexico City: Colegio de Michoacán.
- De Wolf, Paul (1991). Curso básico del tarasco hablado (in Spanish). Zamora: Colegio de Michoacán. ISBN 978-968-7230-61-0.
- Foster, Mary LeCron (1969). The Tarascan Language (PhD thesis). Berkeley: University of California.
- Foster, Mary LeCron (1971). "Tarascan". In Jesse Sawyer (ed.). Studies in American Indian Languages. Berkeley: University of California Press.
- Friedrich, Paul (1984). "Tarascan: From Meaning to Sound.". In Munro Edmonson (ed.). Supplement to the Handbook of Middle American Indians. Vol. 2. Austin: University of Texas Press.
- Friedrich, Paul (1969). "On the meaning of the Tarascan suffixes of Space". International Journal of American Linguistics. Memoir 23. Indian University Press. Archived from the original on February 17, 2022.
- Friedrich, Paul (1970). "Shape in Grammar". Language. 46 (2, Part 1): 379–407. doi:10.2307/412285. JSTOR 412285.
- Friedrich, Paul (1971a). "Dialectal Variation in Tarascan Phonology". International Journal of American Linguistics. 37 (3): 164–187. doi:10.1086/465157. JSTOR 1264603. S2CID 144551580.
- Friedrich, Paul (1971b). The Tarascan suffixes of locative space: meaning and morphotactics. Bloomington: Indiana University. ISBN 978-0-87750-159-6.
- Friedrich, Paul (1975). A phonology of Tarascan. Chicago: University of Chicago, Department of Anthropology. ISBN 978-0-916256-03-6.
- Friedrich, Paul (1971c). "Distinctive Features and Functional Groups in Tarascan Phonology". Language. 47 (4): 849–865. doi:10.2307/412160. JSTOR 412160.
- Greenberg, Joseph (1987). Language in the Americas. Stanford: Stanford University Press.
- Hernández Dimas, Ma. Guadalupe; et al. (1999). Curso de lengua p'urhépecha (in Spanish). Mexico City: UNAM.
- Monzón, Cristina (1997). Introducción a la lengua y cultura tarascas (in Spanish). Valencia, Spain: Universidad de Valencia. ISBN 978-84-370-3307-5.
- Pahuamba, Juan Velázquez; et al. (1997). Vocabulario práctico bilingüe p'urhépecha-español. Dirección General de Culturas Populares, PACMyC.
- Pollard, Helen Perlstein (1993). Taríacuri's Legacy: The Prehispanic Tarascan State. The Civilization of the American Indian series. Vol. 209. Norman: University of Oklahoma Press. ISBN 978-0-8061-2497-1. OCLC 26801144.
- Villavicencio Zarza, Frida (2006). P'orhépecha kaso sïrátahenkwa: Desarrollo del sistema de casos del purépecha (in Spanish). Mexico, DF: Colegio de México, Centro de Investigaciones Superiores en Antropología Social. ISBN 978-968-496-592-8.
