= Pame languages =

Oto-Pamean language group of Mexico

Pame
- Native to: Mexico
- Region: San Luis Potosí, Puebla
- Ethnicity: Pame people
- Native speakers: 12,000 (2020 census)
- Language family: Oto-Manguean: Oto-Pame; Pame

Language codes
- ISO 639-3: Variously: pbs – Central Pame pmq – Northern Pame pmz – Southern Pame
- Glottolog: pame1260
- ELP: Northern Pame
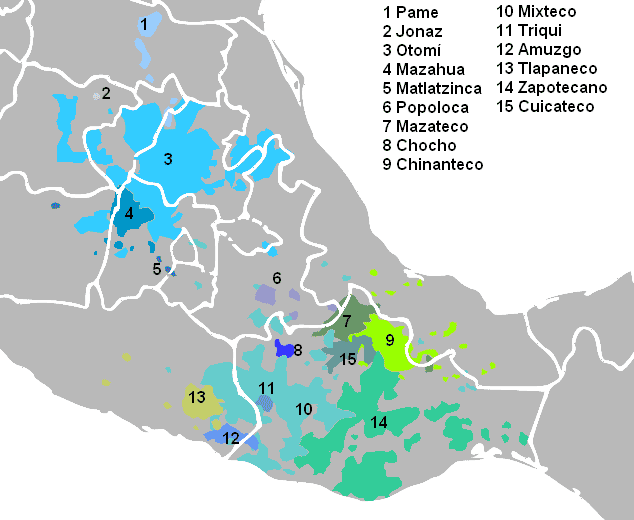
- The Pame language, number 1 (azure), north

The Pame languages are a group of languages in Mexico that is spoken by around 12,000 Pame people in the state of San Luis Potosí. It belongs to the Oto-Pamean branch of the Oto-Manguean language family.

== Distribution and languages ==
Ethnologue notes two living varieties of Pame both spoken in the state of San Luis Potosí: Central Pame, in the town of Santa María Acapulco, and Northern Pame, in communities from the north of Río Verde to the border with Tamaulipas.

The third variety, Southern Pame, was last described in the mid 20th century, is assumed to be extinct, and is very sparsely documented. It was spoken in Jiliapan, Hidalgo, and Pacula, Querétaro.

- Northern Pame (Ñãʔũ) (~6,000)
- Central Pame (Šiʔúi) (~6,000)
- Southern Pame (Šiyúi) (†)

== Classification ==
The Pame languages are part of the Oto-Pamean branch of the Oto-Manguean language family. They are most closely related to the Chichimeca Jonaz language, spoken in Guanajuato, and together, they form the Pamean language groups. During the colonial period, two grammatical descriptions were written.

== Phonology ==
=== Consonants ===
Berthiaume (2004) report a complex phonology for Northern Pame with contrasts between plain, voiced, aspirated, and glottalized consonants both for the stops, nasals, affricates and approximants.

		Bilabial	Alveolar		Palatal	Velar	Glottal
		Bilabial	plain	pal.	Palatal	Velar	Glottal
Nasal	voiced	m	n		ɲ		
Nasal	aspirated	mʱ	nʱ		ɲʱ		
Nasal	glottalized	mˀ	nˀ		ɲˀ		
Stop	voiceless	p	t			k	ʔ
Stop	aspirated	pʰ	tʰ			kʰ	
Stop	ejective		tʼ			kʼ	
Stop	voiced	b	d			g	
Fricative	voiceless		s		ʃ		h
Fricative	voiced		z				
Affricate	voiceless		t͡s		t͡ʃ		
Affricate	aspirated		t͡sʰ		t͡ʃʰ		
Affricate	ejective		t͡sʼ		t͡ʃʼ		
Affricate	voiced				d͡ʒ		
Flap			ɾ	ɾʲ			
Lateral	voiced		l		ʎ		
Lateral	aspirated		lʱ		ʎʱ		
Lateral	glottalized		lˀ		ʎˀ		
Semivowel					j	w	

Pame languages are tonal but the exact number of tonal contrasts is a matter of debate. Avelino, Gibson and Manrique have analyzed the language as having three tones: high and low level tones and a falling contour tone (Suárez 1983, pg. 51). However, Berthiaume (2004) argues that only a high and a rising tone exist, no low, level tone.

=== Vowels ===
	Front	Central	Back
Close	i		u
Mid	e	ə	
Open	æ		ɑ

== Grammar ==
Pame grammar is characterized by complex morphophonemics and suppletion. Many grammatical categories are marked by exchanging consonants in patterns that are not fully predictable. The morphology is head-marking, marking agreement with possessors on nouns and with the participants in actions on verbs. Its personal system distinguishes between singular, dual and plural number in all persons, and there is also an exclusive first-person category ("we but not you").

Pame has an octal (base-8) counting system, as the Pame keep counting their knuckles, rather than the fingers.

== Examples ==
The following table shows the numbers and some basic words in different varieties of Pame:

GLOSS	Southern Pame		Central Pame	Northern Pame	PROTO- PAME
GLOSS	(Jiliapan)	(Tilaco)	(Santa María)	(Alaquines)	PROTO- PAME
1	nna	nna	ndɑ	sɑnte	*^{n}da
2	ti	ti-y~~i~~i	nui	nuyi	*nui
3	niyũ	ti-ñũn	rɑnhũʔ	rnuʔ	*-nũʔ
4	tipiyã	tyipya	ki-ñui	giriui	*ki-nui
5	šp~~i~~tũnt	šputun	kik^{ʔ}ɑi	gič^{ʔ}ɑi	*kik^{ʔ}ɑi
6	tikiyen	taken	tiliyɑ	teriɑ	*te-
7	tekiti	ki-y~~i~~i	tiliñũhũñ	teriuhiñ	*te-?i+2
8	teiniyun	ky~~i~~dinũn	ndɑ ntsɑwʔ	tenhiuñ	*te-?-nũʔ
9	nahwẽn	nawẽ	nda ntsawʔ nda	kɑrɑ tenhiuñ santa	?
10	stut^{ʔ}u	štusu	seskɑʔɑi	kɑrɑ tenhiuñ nuji	?
'head'	kiñãu	keyãw	ganãw	ganãu	*kənaw
'eye'	nta	ndao	gotao	ntao	*^{n}ta
'nose'	šiñũ	šiyõa	ʦiñowa	šiñõã	*šiñũ(?)
'mouth'	k~~i~~ne	kane	kona	kteye	*
'pie'	nogua	nigowa	mok^{w}a	mok^{w}a	*mok^{w}a
'corn'	ʦ^{ʔ}iũ	t^{y}õã	gu-d^{h}wã	t^{ʔ}wã	*t^{ʔ}wã
'metate'	mbot	nab^{ʔ}ot^{ʔ}	k^{ʔ}yi	k^{ʔ}~~i~~yn	?
'chile'	b~~i~~hi	mahi	mahi	l^{ʔ}u	*-hi
'tomato'	mpia	rumbay	lapay	db~~i~~pay	*-pay
'bean'	tio	t^{ʔ}awuʔ	gu-k^{ʔ}we	k^{ʔ}w~~i~~	*k^{ʔ}w~~i~~(?)
'meat'	m~~i~~gu	mag~~i~~ybi	pakas	pakas	*^{m}pak-(?)
'eat'	dii, nii	nii	s~~i~~hin	sey	*s~~i~~-
'maguey'	š~~i~~-nʤ~~i~~a	p^{ʔ}i-doa	go-doa	^{n}dwa	*^{n}doa
'alcohol'	pink^{ʔ}i	pingi	ke-pi	k~~i~~-pint	?
'forest'	m~~i~~pwi	set^{ʔ}a	mabwo	kwãn	*m~~i~~kwV (?)
'flower'	ntu	nd^{ʔ}ow	go-tun	nkyun	*^{n}do-ni
'dog'	nn^{ʔ}ow	nn^{ʔ}ow	nadu	dyo	*^{n}d^{ʔ}o-
'horse'	pahan	bhãn	wah~~i~~l	pahal	*pahal-(?)
'stone'	k~~i~~do	kudo	kotu	g~~i~~tu	*k~~i~~-^{n}to
'sun'	mpãẽ	n~~i~~mbay	kunhu	mpa	*^{m}pay
'moon'	m^{ʔ}õ	m^{ʔ}ãũ	m^{ʔ}au	m^{ʔ}ãũ	*m^{ʔ}au
'water'	b~~i~~sa	masa	kwote	kãnte	*^{n}te
'mountain'	t^{ʔ}oe	t^{ʔ}~~i~~	go-loe	toe	*t^{ʔ}oe
'salt'	t^{ʔ}iũs	t^{ʔ}ũs	l^{ʔ}ũs	t^{ʔ}ũs	*t^{ʔ}ũs
'market'	tityawt	tetãwn	kekywãw	kik^{ʔ}y~~i~~č	*teta-
'year'	špo	šop^{ʔ}aw	ningyihin	čy~~ii~~	?
'week'	nimpya	nembẽ	nembẽyn	pyẽy	*^{m}pyẽ(y)
'night'	sãu	nasaw	gu-sãw	d~~i~~gun	*sãw
'cold'	ʦe	ʦe	ʦee	ʦee	*ʦe(e)
'hot'	pa	mapa	mapa	mpa	*(ma)pa

== Media ==
Pame-language programming is carried by the CDI's radio station XEANT-AM, based in Tancanhuitz de Santos, San Luis Potosí.

== Bibliography ==
- Suaréz, Jorge A. 1983. The Mesoamerican Indian Languages. Cambridge: CUP
- Berthiaume, S. C. (2004). A phonological grammar of Northern Pame (Doctoral dissertation, PhD thesis, University of Texas at Arlington).
- Avelino, H. (2006). The typology of Pame number systems and the limits of Mesoamerica as a linguistic area. Linguistic Typology, 9, 493–513.
- Gibson, L. F. (1956). Pame (Otomi) phonemics and morphophonemics. International Journal of American Linguistics, 22(4), 242–265.
- Gibson, Lorna, and Doris Bartholomew. "Pame noun inflection." International Journal of American Linguistics 45, no. 4 (1979): 309–322.
- Manrique Castañeda, Leonardo. "Análisis preliminar del vocabulario pame de Fray Juan Guadalupe Soriano." In Anales de Antropología, vol. 12, no. 1. 2009.
- Castañeda, L. M. (1960). Dos gramáticas pames del siglo XVIII. Anales del Instituto Nacional de Antropología e Historia, sexta época (1945–1967), 11, 283–287.
- Lastra, Y. (2015). Tratado del arte y unión de los idiomas otomí y pame; Vocabularios de los idiomas pame, otomi, mexicano y jonaz de Fray Juan Guadalupe Soriano.
- Manrique Castañeda, Leonardo. 1967. Jiliapan Pame. The Handbook of Middle American Indians, ed. by Robert Wauchope, general editor, Norman McQuown, volume editor, vol. 5, 331–48. Austin: University of Texas Press.
- Soustelle, Jacques [1937] (1992): La familia Otomí-Pame de México Central, Fondo de Cultura Económica, México DF, ISBN 968-16-4116-7.
