= Experimental SRCI radio stations in Yucatán =

School radio stations in Yucatán, Mexico

The Sistema de Radiodifusoras Culturales Indigenistas (SRCI or System of Indigenous Cultural Broadcasters), operated four experimental 10-watt FM radio stations located at Mayan boarding schools in the state of Yucatán. Each station was operated by children at the boarding schools. The stations existed from 1995 to 2019; the concessions were surrendered in June 2020.

The 10 watts allotted for the stations made them the lowest-powered permitted radio stations in Mexico; the IFT awarded a social use concession to XHPEM-FM 100.7, with 5 watts ERP, in May 2015, stripping these stations of this distinction.

== Stations ==
Four FM radio stations were part of this program:

Callsign	Frequency	Location	School	Coordinates
XHCHX-FM	90.5	Chemax	Dr. Alfonso Caso	20°39′18″N 87°56′14″W
XHSMH-FM	95.9	Samahil	José Martí	20°53′09″N 89°53′22″W
XHSAZ-FM	91.5	San Antonio Sodzil, Sacalum Municipality	Justo Sierra Méndez	20°32′16″N 89°36′20″W
XHYAX-FM	96.5	Yaxcopoil	Cecilio Chí	20°44′43″N 89°43′20″W
