= XEXPUJ-AM =

SRCI radio station in Xpujil, Campeche

- San Antonio, Campeche, Mexico; Mexico
- Broadcast area: Campeche & Quintana Roo
- Frequency: 700 kHz
- Branding: La Voz del Corazón de la Selva

Programming
- Format: Indigenous community radio

Ownership
- Owner: INPI – SRCI

History
- First air date: 19 December 1995
- Call sign meaning: X'pujil

Technical information
- Class: B
- Power: 5,000 watts (daytimer)
- Transmitter coordinates: 18°29′33.6″N 89°17′48.7″W

Links
- Website: ecos.inpi.gob.mx/xexpuj/

XEXPUJ-AM (La Voz del Corazón de la Selva – "The Voice of the Heart of the Rain Forest") is an indigenous community radio station broadcasting in Spanish, Yucatec Maya and Ch'ol from Xpujil, Calakmul Municipality, in the Mexican state of Campeche.

It is run by the Cultural Indigenist Broadcasting System (SRCI) of the National Institute of Indigenous Peoples (INPI).
