= KDAZ =

Coordinates: 35°0′31.2″N 106°42′54.1″W

- Albuquerque, New Mexico; United States
- Broadcast area: Albuquerque metropolitan area
- Frequency: 700 kHz
- Branding: Conservative Talk ABQ

Programming
- Format: Conservative talk radio (weekdays); Christian radio (late nights, weekends)
- Affiliations: Compass Media Networks; Genesis Communications Network; Salem Radio Network; Townhall

Ownership
- Owner: Pan American Broadcasting Co., Inc.

History
- First air date: 1959
- Former call signs: KMGM (1959–1962); KVOD (1962–1969)
- Former frequencies: 730 kHz (1960–2021)

Technical information
- Licensing authority: FCC
- Facility ID: 51424
- Class: D
- Power: 450 watts day; 55 watts night
- Translator: 96.9 K245CD (Albuquerque)

Links
- Public license information: Public file; LMS
- Webcast: Listen live
- Website: conservativetalkabq.com

KDAZ (700 AM) is a commercial radio station in Albuquerque, New Mexico. It airs a combination of syndicated talk radio shows and Christian radio programming. It is owned by Pan American Broadcasting Co., Inc.

Weekdays, most of the shows heard on KDAZ are conservative talk programs: Markley, Van Camp and Robbins, The Joe Pags Show, The Lars Larson Show and Jay Sekulow. Hourly newscasts are from Salem Radio Network's Townhall. Christian programming is heard late nights and weekends, along with syndicated shows from Howie Carr and Todd Starnes.

KDAZ is a Class D radio station. By day, it broadcasts at 450 watts. AM 700 is a clear-channel frequency in the United States, reserved for Class A station WLW in Cincinnati. So at night, KDAZ reduces power to 55 watts to avoid interference. Programming is also heard on FM translator K245CD at 96.9 MHz in Albuquerque.

== History ==
=== Early years ===
The station first signed on as KMGM in 1959. It changed its call sign to KVOD in 1962 and to KDAZ in 1969. The station originally broadcast on 730 AM, with 1,000 watts by day and 79 watts at night. It needed a complicated directional antenna to prevent it from interfering with other stations on 730 AM.

For most of its history, KDAZ broadcast Christian radio shows day and night. KDAZ was acquired by its current owner, Pan American Broadcasting, on November 17, 2003.

In 2021, KDAZ moved down the AM dial to 700 AM. The new frequency allowed it to operate with a non-directional antenna using a single tower.

=== FM and TV simulcast ===
In February 2016, a construction permit was granted by the Federal Communications Commission to move FM translator station K230BB from Fowler, Colorado, into the Albuquerque radio market on 96.9 MHz. It would simulcast KDAZ on the FM band at 70 watts from atop Sandia Crest. The translator was licensed on October 13, 2016 as K245CD. However it had not begun broadcasting until early 2017. In December 2016, Pan American Broadcasting purchased the translator from Mountain Community Translators for $30,000. The power was upgraded from 70 watts to 160 watts in early March 2017.

KDAZ can also be heard on the Sky Angel television programming service, located on channel 9773 over satellite and channel 229 over IPTV. Audio can also be heard on television stations KCHF channel 11.5 in Santa Fe and KNMQ-LD channel 43.6 in Albuquerque.

Broadcast translator for KDAZ
Call sign	Frequency	City of license	FID	ERP (W)	Class	FCC info
K245CD	96.9 FM	Albuquerque, New Mexico	140729	250	D	LMS
