= XHNKA-FM =

SRCI radio station in Felipe Carrillo Puerto, Quintana Roo

- Felipe Carrillo Puerto, Quintana Roo; Mexico
- Broadcast area: Quintana Roo
- Frequency: 104.5 MHz
- Branding: La Voz del Gran Pueblo

Programming
- Format: Indigenous community radio

Ownership
- Owner: CDI – SRCI

History
- First air date: 15 June 1999
- Former call signs: XEFCPQ-AM (March–October 1998, never used on air)
- Call sign meaning: Noj KAaj ("gran pueblo")

Technical information
- Licensing authority: CRT
- Class: AA
- ERP: 6,000 watts (FM)
- HAAT: 63.70 m
- Transmitter coordinates: 19°35′07.3″N 88°02′12″W

Links
- Webcast: XHNKA-FM
- Website: XHNKA-FM

XHNKA-FM (La Voz del Gran Pueblo – "The Voice of the Great People") is an indigenous community radio station that broadcasts in Spanish and Yucatec Maya from Felipe Carrillo Puerto, in the Mexican state of Quintana Roo. It is run by the Cultural Indigenist Broadcasting System (SRCI) of the National Commission for the Development of Indigenous Peoples (CDI).

It began broadcasting on June 15, 1999, as XENKA-AM 1030.

In 2012, XENKA was authorized to move to FM as XHNKA-FM 104.5.
