= XEETCH-AM =

SRCI radio station in Etchojoa, Sonora

- Etchojoa, Sonora; Mexico
- Broadcast area: Sonora, Sinaloa and Chihuahua
- Frequency: 700 kHz
- Branding: La Voz de los Tres Ríos

Programming
- Format: Indigenous community radio

Ownership
- Owner: CDI – SRCI

History
- First air date: 19 February 1996
- Call sign meaning: ETCHojoa

Technical information
- Licensing authority: CRT
- Class: B
- Power: 5,000 watts daytime only
- Transmitter coordinates: 26°55′20.1″N 109°37′37.3″W

Links
- Webcast: XEETCH-AM
- Website: XEETCH-AM

XEETCH-AM (La Voz de los Tres Ríos – "The Voice of the Three Rivers") is an Indigenous community radio station that broadcasts in Spanish, Mayo, Yaqui and Guarijio from Etchojoa in the Mexican state of Sonora. It is run by the Cultural Indigenist Broadcasting System (SRCI) of the National Commission for the Development of Indigenous Peoples (CDI).

== History ==
XEETCH was permitted in 1996. It originally broadcast on 1130 kHz.
