= Cuetzalan =

- City
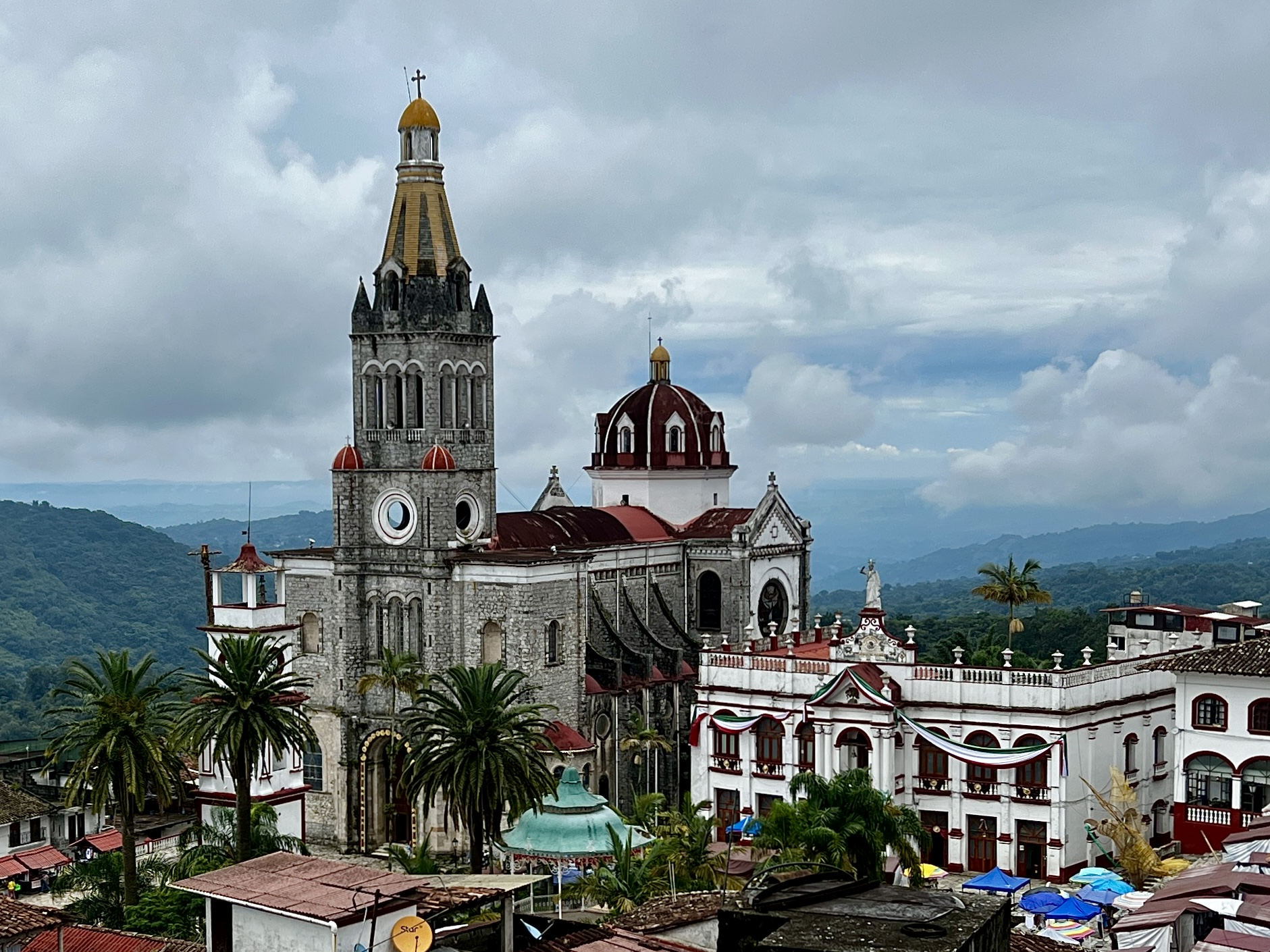
- The Church of San Francisco de Asís and the Municipal Palace in Cuetzalan’s historic center.

- Location within Puebla (state) Location within Mexico
- Coordinates: 20.0186°N 97.5211°W
- Country: Mexico
- State: Puebla
- Municipality: Cuetzalan del Progreso
- Founded: 1547

Population (2020)
  - Total: 6,402
- Time zone: UTC-6 (CST)

Cuetzalan (Spanish: [kwe'tsalan]) is a small town set high in the hills in the north of the Mexican state of Puebla, 183 kilometres (114 mi) from Puebla, the state capital.

Franciscan friars founded the town in 1547.

== Overview ==
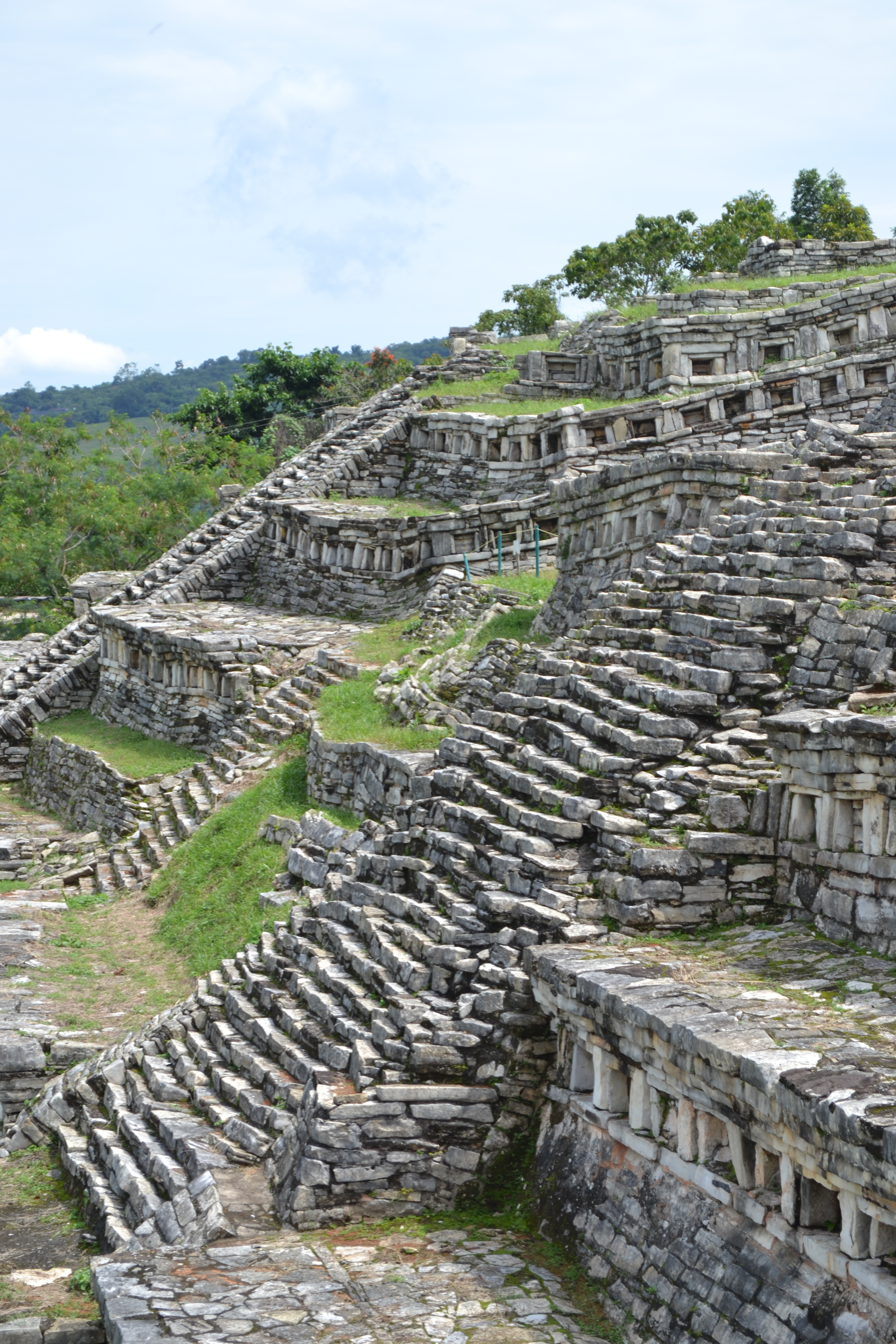
View from the steps of the pyramids of Yohualichan.

Cuetzalan is located in the Sierra Norte region. The climate is warm and humid due to the elevation of 900–1000 meters and proximity to the Gulf of Mexico. The town itself is characterized by sloping cobbled streets and numerous rustic buildings. It serves as the municipal seat for the surrounding municipality of Cuetzalan del Progreso.

Cuetzalan was named a "Pueblo Mágico" in 2002.

The town center is composed largely of handicraft markets as well as numerous stalls selling every-day necessities. As a tourist attraction, the town also has a few bars, restaurants and nightclubs. Getting to Cuetzalán from Puebla takes around four hours. The best route is by getting a coach from central bus depot in Puebla.

The BUAP has a Regional Section here.

== Waterfalls ==
One of the main attractions of the town is La Cascada de las Brisas, a waterfall located within the jungle surrounding the town. There are some open back jeeps that can be taken to the end of the road, where a trail begins through the jungle to the pool at the bottom of the waterfall.

There are countless other waterfalls in the jungle and coffee plantations surrounding the town. Many can be seen by taking the walking paths east, all the way to Papantla, in the State of Veracruz, (a long two- to three-day hike). Upon crossing the river which marks the state boundary of Veracruz and Puebla, the culture and language changes to Totonac.

== Caves ==
The town also features a large network of caves. In 2004 a group of British cavers became trapped in the caves and were stuck for several days. Upon being rescued it transpired that some of them were military personnel. Since the Mexican government had not been informed of the presence of foreign military personnel (although the Mexican military had), they were expelled, causing brief diplomatic friction between the two countries. These caves are potentially very dangerous, and the only reason the 2004 expedition did not suffer the loss of six lives during the flood is that the team was composed of experienced cavers who were well prepared and knew the cave systems intimately, some of them having been involved in exploration in Cuetzalan for 15 years.

== Media ==
XECTZ-AM, a government-run indigenous community radio station that broadcasts in Nahuatl and Totonac, is based in Cuetzalan.
