= XEZV-AM =

SRCI radio station in Tlapa de Comonfort, Guerrero

Tlapa de Comonfort, Guerrero, Mexico; Mexico
- Broadcast area: Guerrero, Oaxaca & Puebla
- Frequency: 800 kHz
- Branding: La Voz de la Montaña

Programming
- Format: Indigenous community radio

Ownership
- Owner: CDI – SRCI

History
- First air date: 10 May 1979

Technical information
- Class: B
- Power: 5000 W (daytime only)
- Transmitter coordinates: 17°33′15.5″N 98°33′02″W

Links
- Webcast: XEZV-AM
- Website: XEZV-AM

XEZV-AM (La Voz de la Montaña – "The Voice of the Mountain") is an indigenous community radio station that broadcasts in Spanish, Nahuatl, Mixtec and Tlapanec from Tlapa de Comonfort in the Mexican state of Guerrero. It is run by the Cultural Indigenist Broadcasting System (SRCI) of the National Commission for the Development of Indigenous Peoples (CDI). Launched on 10 May 1979, it was the first of the SRCI's radio stations in operation.
