= Tzotzil language =

Mayan language spoken in Mexico

Tzotzil
- Batsʼi kʼop
- Pronunciation: [ɓatsʼi kʼopʰ]
- Native to: Mexico
- Region: Chiapas, Oaxaca, Veracruz
- Ethnicity: Tzotzil
- Native speakers: 550,000 (2020 census)
- Language family: Mayan: Cholan–Tzeltalan; Tzeltalan; Tzotzil
- Dialects: Chamula; Zinacantán; San Andrés Larráinzar; Huixtán; Chenalhó; Venustiano Carranza

Language codes
- ISO 639-3: tzo
- Glottolog: tzot1259
- ELP: Tzotzil

Tzotzil (/ˈ(t)soʊtsɪl/; Batsʼi kʼop [ɓatsʼi kʼopʰ]) is a Maya language spoken by the Indigenous Tzotzil Maya people in the Mexican state of Chiapas. Some speakers may be somewhat bilingual in Spanish, but many are monolingual Tzotzil speakers. In Central Chiapas, some primary schools and a secondary school are taught in Tzotzil. Tzeltal is the most closely related language to Tzotzil and together they form a Tzeltalan sub-branch of the Mayan language family. Tzeltal, Tzotzil and Chʼol are the most widely spoken languages in Chiapas besides Spanish.

There are six dialects of Tzotzil with varying degrees of mutual intelligibility, named after the different regions of Chiapas where they are spoken: Chamula, Zinacantán, San Andrés Larráinzar, Huixtán, Chenalhó, and Venustiano Carranza.

== Phonology ==
=== Vowels ===
Tzotzil has five vowels.

	Front	Central	Back
Close	i ⟨i⟩		u ⟨u⟩
Mid	e ⟨e⟩		o ⟨o⟩
Open		a ⟨a⟩	

Before a glottalized consonant, a vowel appears to lengthen and tense, such as a in takʼin "money".

=== Consonants ===
		Labial	Alveolar		Palatal	Velar	Glottal
Nasal		m ⟨m⟩	n ⟨n⟩				
Plosive Affricate	aspirated	pʰ ⟨p⟩	tʰ ⟨t⟩	tsʰ ⟨tz⟩	tʃʰ ⟨ch⟩	kʰ ⟨k⟩	ʔ ⟨ʼ⟩
Plosive Affricate	ejective	pʼ ⟨pʼ⟩	tʼ ⟨tʼ⟩	tsʼ ⟨tzʼ⟩	tʃʼ ⟨chʼ⟩	kʼ ⟨kʼ⟩	ʔ ⟨ʼ⟩
Plosive Affricate	implosive	ɓ ⟨b⟩					ʔ ⟨ʼ⟩
Fricative		w ~ v ~ β ⟨v⟩	s ⟨s⟩		ʃ ⟨x⟩		h ⟨j⟩
Approximant			l ⟨l⟩		j ⟨y⟩		
Flap			ɾ ⟨r⟩				

/b/ is frequently implosive [ɓ], especially in intervocalic or in initial position. It is also weakly glottalized in initial position.

/kʰ pʰ tʰ/ are more strongly aspirated in final position.

/w d f ɡ/ occur but only in loanwords.

Aspirated and ejective consonants form phonemic contrasts: kok, kokʼ and kʼokʼ all have different meanings: ('my leg', 'my tongue' and 'fire', respectively).

=== Syllable structure ===
All words in Tzotzil begin with a consonant, which may be a glottal stop. Consonant clusters are almost always at the beginning of a word, with a prefix and a root. Roots in Tzotzil occur in the forms CVC (tʼul "rabbit"), CV (to "still"), CVCVC (bikʼit "small"), CV(C)VC (xu(v)it "worm", the second consonant disappears in some dialects), CVC-CVC (ʼajnil "wife"), CVCV (ʼama "flute") or CVC-CV (voʼne "long ago"). The most common root is CVC.

Almost all Tzotzil words can be analyzed as a CVC root together with certain affixes.

=== Stress and intonation ===
In normal speech, stress falls on the first syllable of the root in each word, and the last word in a phrase is heavily stressed. For words in isolation, primary stress falls on the final syllable except in affective verbs with -luh, first person plural exclusive suffixes, and reduplicated stems of two syllables. Then, the stress is unpredictable and so is indicated with an acute accent. The Tzotzil variant of San Bartolomé de Los Llanos, in the Venustiano Carranza region, was analyzed as having two phonemic tones by Sarles 1966. Research by Heriberto Avelino in 2009 was not able to confirm more than an unstable and incipient tone contrast.

=== Phonological processes ===
- When intervocalic, /b/ is pre-glottalized and when it is followed by a consonant, b becomes a voiced m preceded by a glottal stop. In final position, b becomes a voiceless m preceded by a glottal stop so tzeb "girl" is pronounced [tseʔm̥].
- When adding an affix results in double fricative consonants, only one is pronounced so xx, ss, nn, or jj should be pronounced as x [ʃ], s.[s], n [n], or j [h]. For example, ta ssut "He is returning" is pronounced [ta sut] . Other double consonants are pronounced twice, like tztz or chch, in verbal construction or in words with the same two consonants appearing in conjoining syllables: chchan "He learns it" is pronounced [tʃ-tʃan].
- s changes to x when prefixed to a stem beginning with ch, chʼ, or x.
- x changes to s when prefixed to a stem with an initial or final tz or s.

== Morphology ==
In Tzotzil, only nouns, verbs, and attributives can be inflected.

=== Nouns ===
Nouns can take affixes of possession, reflexive relation, independent state (absolutive suffix), number, and exclusion, as well as agentives and nominalizing formatives. Compounds can be formed in three ways:

- nominal root+nominal root jol-vitz "summit" (head-hill)
- verbal root+nominal root kʼat-in-bak "inferno" (to burn-bone)
- attributive root/particle+nominal root unen-vinik "dwarf" (small-man)

An example of a prefix for nouns is x-, an indicator of a non-domesticated animal: x-tʼel "large lizard"

The plural suffixes for a noun change based on whether or not the noun is possessed:

- -t-ik, -ik. Plural suffix for possessed nouns, linked with possessive prefixes: s-chikin-ik "his/her/their ears", k-ichʼak-t-ik "our fingernails"
- -et-ik. Plural suffix for non-possessed nouns: vitz-et-ik "hills", mut-et-ik "birds"
- -t-ak. Plural suffix for objects that come in pairs, or when it is necessary to indicate the plural of both the noun and the possessor: j-chikin-t-ak "my (two) ears", s-bi-t-ak "their names"

Some nouns, such as words for body parts and kinship terms, must always be possessed. They cannot be used without a possessive prefix, or otherwise must be used with an absolute suffix to express an indefinite possessor. The possessive prefixes are:

Singular	Plural
k- / j-	k- / j-...-t-ik
av- / a-	av- / a-...-ik
y- / s-	y- / s-...-ik

The prefix listed first is the one used before a root starting with a vowel, the prefix listed second is the one used before a root starting with a consonant. For example, k+ok kok "my foot", j+ba jba "my face"

The absolute suffix is usually il but can also have the form el, al, or ol: kʼob-ol "hand (of some unspecified person)"

=== Verbs ===
Verbs receive affixes of aspect, tense, pronominal subject and object and formatives of state, voice, mood and number. They can also form compounds in three ways:

- verb+noun tzob-takʼin "to raise money"
- verb+verb mukul-milvan "to murder"
- attributive+verb chʼul-totin "to become a godfather"

=== Attributives ===
Attributives are words that can function as predicates, but are neither verbs nor nouns. Often they can be translated into English as adjectives. Unlike verbs, they do not inflect for aspect, and unlike nouns, they cannot head a noun phrase or combine with possessive affixes. The composition of attributives occurs in three ways:

- verbal root+noun maʼ-sat "blind" (negative-eye)

For colors:

- attributive of color+verbal root+formative -an "shadow, shade (of color)" kʼan-setʼ-an "shade of yellow"
- attributive of color reduplicated+t-ik "type of plural" tzoj-tzoj-t-ik < tzoj "red" This construction implies intensity in the color.

== Syntax ==
The basic word order of Tzotzil is VOS (verb-object-subject). Subjects and direct objects are not marked for case. The predicate agrees in person, and sometimes in number, with its subject and direct object. Non-emphatic personal pronouns are always left out.

=== Verb agreement ===
Since the agreement system in Tzotzil is ergative-absolutive, the subject of an intransitive verb and the direct object of a transitive verb are marked by the same set of affixes, while the subject of a transitive is marked with a different set of affixes. For example, compare the affixes in the following sentences:

- l- i- tal -otik "We (inclusive) came."
- ʼi j- pet -tik lokʼel ti vinik -e "We (inclusive) carried away the man."

In the first sentence, the intransitive verb tal ("come") is affixed by -i-...-otik to show that the subject is the 1st person plural inclusive "we," but in the second sentence, since the verb pet ("carry") is transitive, it is affixed by j-...-tik to mark the subject as the 1st person plural inclusive "we."

- l- i- s- pet -otik "He carried us (inclusive)"

From this sentence we can see that the 1st person plural inclusive object "us" is being marked the same as the 1st person plural inclusive intransitive subject "we" using -i-...-otik. Thus, -i-...-otik is the absolutive marker for 1st person plural inclusive and j-...-tik is the ergative marker for 1st person plural inclusive.

Also from the sentence l- i- s- pet -otik "He carried us (inclusive)" it is possible to see the 3rd person ergative marking s-, which contrasts with the 3rd person absolutive marking Ø in the sentence ʼi- tal "He/she/it/they came."

=== Enumeration ===
With many nouns, numbers must be compounded to numeral classifiers that correspond to the physical nature of the object being counted. This precedes the noun being counted. For example, in vak-pʼej na "six houses" the classifier -pʼej "round things, houses, flowers, etc." is compounded to the number vak "six" and precedes the noun na "house(s)."

== Sample lexicon ==
English	Tzotzil
one	jun
two	chib
three	ʼoxib
money	takʼin
tortilla	vaj
face	satil
house	na
water	voʼ
tree	teʼ
river	ʼukʼum

There are also many Spanish loanwords in Tzotzil, such as:

- rominko < domingo "Sunday"
- pero < pero "but"
- preserente < presidente "president"
- bino < vino "wine"

== Dictionaries and grammars ==
In 1975, the Smithsonian Institution produced a dictionary of Tzotzil, containing some 30,000 Tzotzil-English entries, and half that number of English-Tzotzil entries, the most comprehensive resource on Tzotzil vocabulary to that date. Tzotzil word-lists and grammars date back to the late 19th century, most notably in Otto Stoll's Zur Ethnographie der Republik Guatemala (1884).

== Liturgical use ==
In 2013, Pope Francis approved translations of the prayers for Mass and the celebration of sacraments into Tzotzil and Tzeltal. The translations include "the prayers used for Mass, marriage, baptisms, confirmations, confessions, ordinations and the anointing of the sick ... Bishop Arizmendi said Oct. 6 that the texts, which took approximately eight years to translate, would be used in his diocese and the neighboring Archdiocese of Tuxtla Gutiérrez. Mass has been celebrated in the diocese in recent years with the assistance of translators — except during homilies — Bishop Arizmendi said in an article in the newspaper La Jornada.

== Media ==
Tzotzil-language programming is carried by the CDI's radio stations XEVFS, broadcasting from Las Margaritas, Chiapas, and XECOPA, based in Copainalá, Chiapas.

Document established a brotherhood in the language, dated sometime during the colonial period.
