= Cherán =

Coordinates: 19°41′N 101°57′W

- Municipality
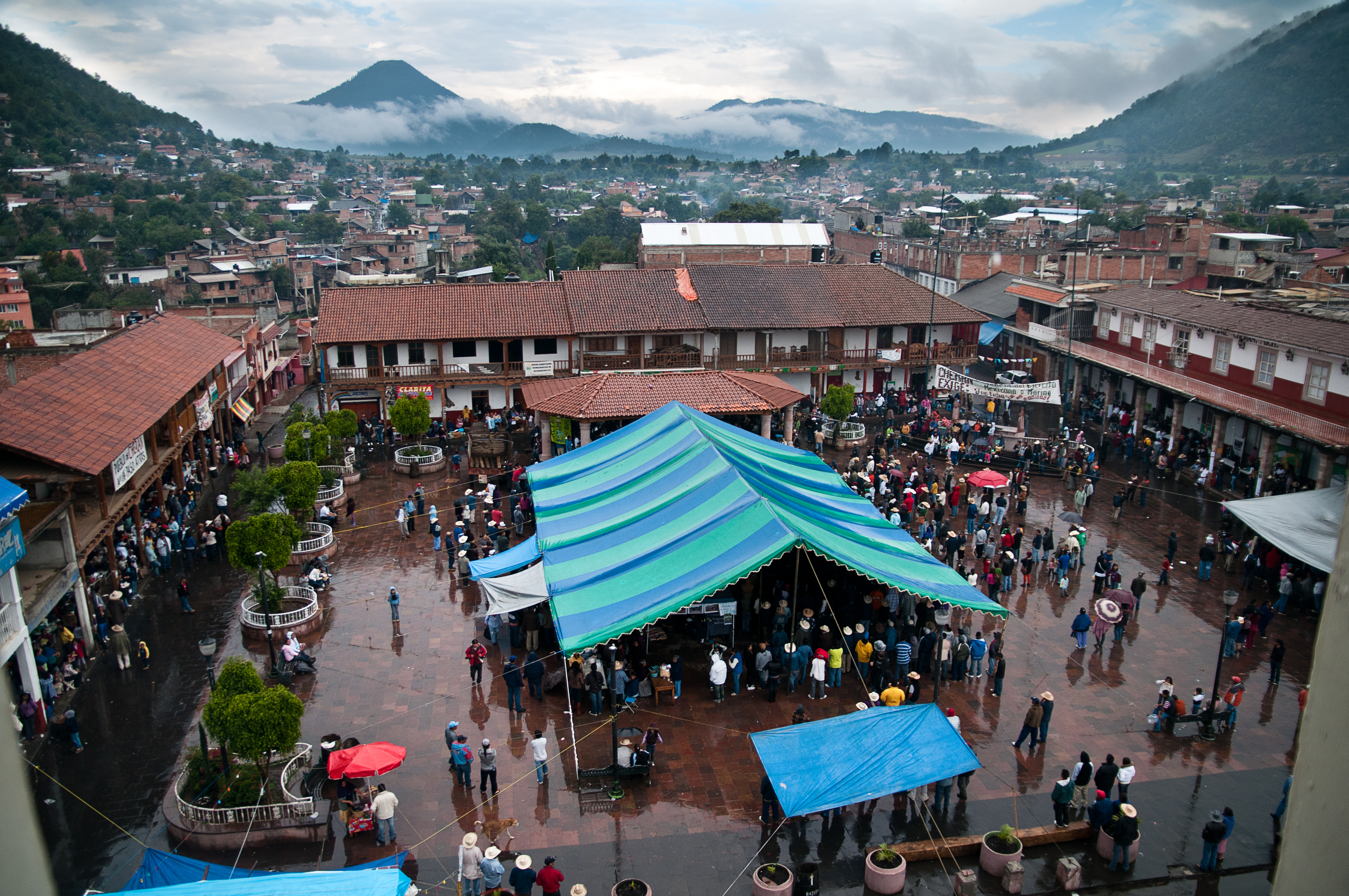
- Central plaza of Cherán

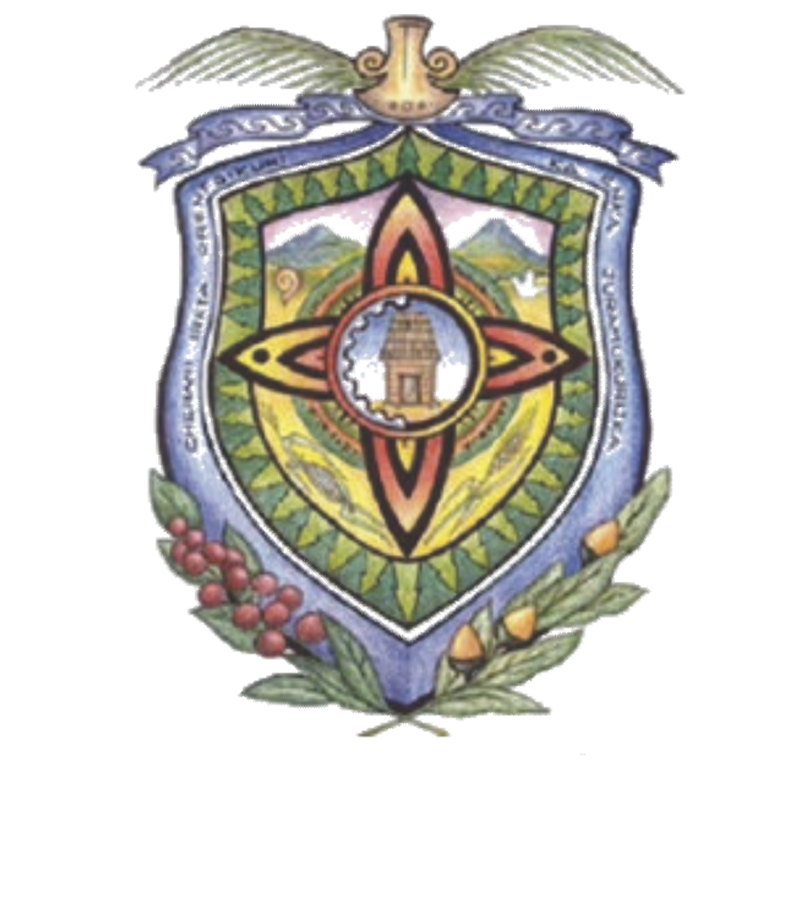
- Coat of arms

- Municipality of Cherán within Michoacán
- Country: Mexico
- State: Michoacán

Area
  - Total: 223.02 km^{2} (86.11 sq mi)
- Elevation: 2,251 m (7,385 ft)

Population
  - Total: 16,243
- Time zone: UTC−6 (CST)

Cherán (Spanish pronunciation: [tʃe'ɾan]) is a municipality located in the Mexican state of Michoacán, which is situated in the central western portion of Mexico, extending west to the Pacific Shore. Cherán itself lies in the northwestern portion of Michoacán, about 360 km (220 mi) west of Mexico City and approximately 123 km (76 mi) west of the state capital of Morelia; its average elevation is 2,251 metres (7,385 ft) above sea level. The Municipio (municipality) of Cherán is reported to have a population of 16,243, while the Localidad (town) of Cherán is officially accounted to have a population of 12,616, including 5,827 men and 6,787 women.

Cherán is one of a contiguous group of eleven Municipios that are demographically denoted as Purépecha. Inhabitants speak the Purépecha language, as well as the local variety of Spanish. Cherán is noted for its unique style of government that followed a 2011 civil uprising over local concerns about corruption and crime. The area is now treated as a self-ruling indigenous community, largely free of federal intervention.

== Etymology ==
In his book Crossing Over, Rubén Martínez explains that Cherán means "a place of fear" in the Purépecha language, alluding to its unfriendly landscape of "abrupt, irregular peaks and chasms" which bodes disaster to anyone taking a careless step.

== 2011 uprising and the transition away from government control ==
Like many other Michoacán communities, Cherán suffered from organized crime, bribed politicians and corrupt police. Kidnappings, extortion, murders, and illegal logging of the local forest—the lifeblood of the community—were part of daily life. The Los Angeles Times provides the background of the 2011 uprising:

That was the year that residents, most of them indigenous and poor, waged an insurrection and declared self-rule in hopes of ridding themselves of the ills that plague so much of Mexico: raging violence, corrupt politicians, a toothless justice system and gangs that have expanded from drug smuggling to extortion, kidnapping and illegal logging.

In the three years leading up to the uprising, cartels had clear cut about half of the community's almost 60,000 acres; afterwards the community banned logging healthy wood and began a project to regrow native trees.

"To defend ourselves," explained a community leader, "we had to change the whole system — out with the political parties, out with City Hall, out with the police and everything. We had to organize our own way of living to survive". Thus, on April 15, 2011 a group of women and men using rocks and fireworks attacked a busload of illegal loggers who were armed with machine guns and associated with the Mexican drug cartel La Familia Michoacana. The vigilantes assumed control over the town, expelled the police force and politicians and blocked roads leading to the forest that had been subject to illegal logging by armed gangs supported by corrupt officials.

Community policing has been extended to twenty-thousand inhabitants, and over 27,000 hectares of communal land. Neighborhood watch members patrol both the town and the surrounding forests.

The Constitution of Mexico permits self government and self-policing by indigenous communities. Following lengthy legal battles, the Mexican government is treating autonomous Cherán as a legal self-governing indigenous community.

"In Cherán’s unique form of government, the real power lies wholly with the people. There is not a single decision taken without consensus, from who will get a local job in construction, to the allocation of public services and overseeing the spending of the budget. The authority of the community’s assembly is above any other local governmental body."

The community elects a 12-person council, "K'eri Jánaskakua," and has about 180 fogatas (campfires / community fires) in its four neighborhoods.

The Third Council (Council of Elders, High Council, Consejo Mayor, Consejo de Keris) was named in 2018. Other representative bodies include a youth council, a women's council, neighborhood councils, and a communal territory council focused on business development.

The town has prohibited political parties and political campaigns.

According to The Guardian, Cherán's version of direct democracy provided "a simple solution to the vote-buying and patronage which plague Mexican democracy." Direct democracy, according to one community activist, not only saved the forest, but brought peace: In 2017, Cherán had the lowest homicide rate in the entire state of Michoacán and perhaps even in the entire country of Mexico.

== Geography ==
Rubén Martínez describes the length of Cherán from north to south as about three-quarters of a mile.

=== Climate ===
Cherán is in a tropical area but, because of its altitude, is cooler than the lower lying jungles and coastlands. Instituto Nacional de Estadística Geografía e Informática (INEGI) indicates that the average temperatures for nearby Zamora, 48 kilometers away, between the years of 1971 and 1999 ranged between 17 °C and 24 °C. INEGI also reported average annual precipitation in Zamora over the same period of time as being 820.3 mm (32.30 in).

== Business and government statistics ==
The three prominent buildings in Cherán include the church, the presidencia municipal, and the casa de cambio, or currency exchange center. In 2000, the government website reported the town was home to 2,589 dwellings.

== Infrastructure ==
In 2000, the municipal website of Cherán reported that 80% of water is potable, 60% of the roads are paved, 90% of the streets have public lighting, and 35% of garbage is collected. The municipality also reported having pre-school, primary, and secondary educational facilities. Adults have access to the services of the Instituto Nacional de Educación.

A rainwater capture system located at the extinct volcano Cerro de Kukundikata covers 1.5 hectares. It is capable of providing 20,000 liters of drinking water, sufficient for two months of drought.

== Economy ==
The average annual wage is estimated at about US$3,000.

In 2007, agriculture and raising livestock accounted for 49% of Cherán's economic activity: corn, wheat, potatoes, beans and oats make up the bulk of the community's harvest while its local farmers raise cows, horses, pigs, sheep and goats. Wooden products, including furniture and furniture repair, and cork account for less than 19% of the economy. Commercial production of apples, peaches, apricots, pears and plums comprised 10% of Cherán's economic resources. There were essentially no services besides fondas, or small restaurants, that serve local fare.

In 2015, the town created its own collectively owned sawmill, greenhouse and concrete factory. The town engages in the production of resin and concrete blocks for construction.

=== Forestry ===
One estimate states that about half of the area's 17,000 hectares of forest have been lost to illegal logging. According to other sources, "about fifty thousand acres of forest were illegally cut between 2008 and 2011," and 200–250 logging trucks a day passed through the town.

During the initial confrontation that provoked the 2011 uprising, women were concerned that logging threatened a spring important for local water supply.

In the five years since the uprising, the town's tree nursery provided seedlings to replant 3,000 hectares of trees.

In 2022, AP News published an update about the community which patrols the forest looking for illegal logging and avocado planting.

== Culture ==
The town's social cohesion stems in part from its many large extended families. Most residents are native to the area, and it is customary to marry within the town.

== Media ==
XEPUR-AM, a government-run indigenous community radio station that broadcasts in Purépecha, is based in Cherán. The community also has a YouTube channel and blog. Community television station TV Cherán was launched in Nov 29, 2014.

== See also ==
- Anarchism in Mexico
- Popular Indigenous Council of Oaxaca "Ricardo Flores Magón"
- Rebel Zapatista Autonomous Municipalities
