= San Lucas Ojitlán =

- Municipality and town
- Location in Mexico
- Coordinates: 18°03′N 96°24′W
- Country: Mexico
- State: Oaxaca

Area
  - Total: 595.81 km^{2} (230.04 sq mi)

Population (2005)
  - Total: 19,871
- Time zone: UTC-6 (Central Standard Time)

San Lucas Ojitlán is a town and municipality in Oaxaca in south-western Mexico. The municipality covers an area of 595.81 km^{2}. It is part of the Tuxtepec District of the Papaloapan Region.

As of 2005, the municipality had a total population of 19,871.
