= Las Margaritas, Chiapas =

Las Margaritas

- Location within Chiapas Location within Mexico
- Coordinates: 16°18′55″N 91°58′54″W
- Country: Mexico
- State: Chiapas
- Municipality: Las Margaritas
- Village status: 9 December 1871
- City status: 24 March 1981

Area
  - Municipality: 3,015 km^{2} (1,164 sq mi)
  - City: 10.08 km^{2} (3.89 sq mi)
- Elevation: 1,521 m (4,990 ft)

Population (2020 census)
  - Municipality: 141,027
  - Density: 46.78/km^{2} (121.1/sq mi)
  - City: 24,326
  - City density: 2,413/km^{2} (6,250/sq mi)
- Time zone: UTC-6 (CST)
- Postal code: 30187
- Area code: 963

Las Margaritas is a city, and the surrounding municipality of the same name, in the Mexican state of Chiapas. The municipal seat is located some 25 km to the northeast of Comitán de Domínguez, while the municipality extends to the east as far as the border with Guatemala. Part of the Lagunas de Montebello National Park is in the municipality's territory.

== Demographics ==
As of 2010, the municipality had a total population of 111,484,

As of 2010, the city of Las Margaritas had a population of 20,786. Other than the city of Las Margaritas, the municipality had 486 localities, the largest of which (with 2010 populations in parentheses) were: Plan de Ayala (3,164), classified as urban, and Veinte de Noviembre (2,207), Jalisco (1,915), Yasha (1,862), Chiapas (1,808), Nuevo San Juan Chamula (El Pacayal) (1,684), Bajucú (1,665), Francisco I. Madero (1,626), Justo Sierra (San Francisco) (1,386), El Edén (1,283), Saltillo (1,222), El Vergel (1,177), Rafael Ramírez (1,075), Veracruz (1,062), Lomantán (1,034), and El Progreso (1,007), classified as rural.

== History ==
The municipality was created and the settlement given the status of a pueblo (village) on 9 December 1871, by Governor José Pantaleón Domínguez. On 24 March 1981, under Governor Juan Sabines Gutiérrez, the municipal seat was given city (ciudad) status.

In January 1994 it was one of the cities seized by the Zapatista National Liberation Army (EZLN) during their uprising. The village of La Realidad, headquarters of the EZLN military command, is located in the municipality.

== Geography ==
- 16°18′55″N 91°58′54″W
- 1,521 metres above sea level
- Postal code: 30187
- LADA area code: 963

== Climate ==
Climate data for Las Margaritas (1991–2020)
| Month | Jan | Feb | Mar | Apr | May | Jun | Jul | Aug | Sep | Oct | Nov | Dec | Year |
|---|---|---|---|---|---|---|---|---|---|---|---|---|---|
| Record high °C (°F) | 46.0 (114.8) | 48.0 (118.4) | 46.0 (114.8) | 46.0 (114.8) | 41.0 (105.8) | 38.0 (100.4) | 38.0 (100.4) | 38.0 (100.4) | 38.0 (100.4) | 39.0 (102.2) | 38.0 (100.4) | 36.0 (96.8) | 48.0 (118.4) |
| Mean daily maximum °C (°F) | 24.2 (75.6) | 25.7 (78.3) | 27.3 (81.1) | 29.0 (84.2) | 28.5 (83.3) | 27.2 (81.0) | 26.3 (79.3) | 26.7 (80.1) | 26.7 (80.1) | 26.3 (79.3) | 25.2 (77.4) | 24.6 (76.3) | 26.5 (79.7) |
| Daily mean °C (°F) | 16.8 (62.2) | 17.8 (64.0) | 19.1 (66.4) | 20.6 (69.1) | 21.0 (69.8) | 20.8 (69.4) | 20.1 (68.2) | 20.2 (68.4) | 20.3 (68.5) | 19.8 (67.6) | 18.3 (64.9) | 17.4 (63.3) | 19.4 (66.9) |
| Mean daily minimum °C (°F) | 9.4 (48.9) | 9.9 (49.8) | 11.0 (51.8) | 12.2 (54.0) | 13.6 (56.5) | 14.4 (57.9) | 13.8 (56.8) | 13.8 (56.8) | 14.0 (57.2) | 13.2 (55.8) | 11.5 (52.7) | 10.2 (50.4) | 12.2 (54.0) |
| Record low °C (°F) | −2.0 (28.4) | 0.1 (32.2) | 1.0 (33.8) | 3.0 (37.4) | 6.0 (42.8) | 5.0 (41.0) | 7.0 (44.6) | 7.0 (44.6) | 5.0 (41.0) | 2.0 (35.6) | 0.0 (32.0) | −2.0 (28.4) | −2.0 (28.4) |
| Average precipitation mm (inches) | 23.7 (0.93) | 20.2 (0.80) | 27.0 (1.06) | 31.6 (1.24) | 99.1 (3.90) | 197.2 (7.76) | 152.4 (6.00) | 145.6 (5.73) | 200.8 (7.91) | 116.3 (4.58) | 40.1 (1.58) | 17.2 (0.68) | 1,071.2 (42.17) |
| Average precipitation days (≥ 0.1 mm) | 4.1 | 3.2 | 3.2 | 4.1 | 8.9 | 15.7 | 14.9 | 15.2 | 16.6 | 10.9 | 6.0 | 4.1 | 106.9 |
Source: Servicio Meteorologico Nacional

== Media ==
- XEVFS, a government-run indigenous community radio station.
