= Etchojoa =

Town in Sonora, Mexico

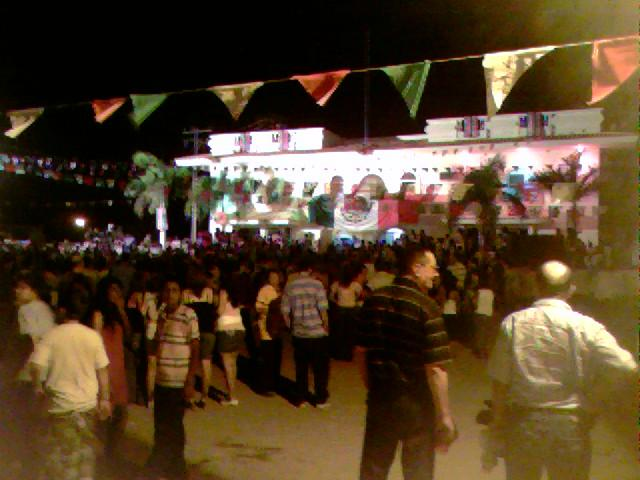
Plaza and Palacio Municipal (Municipal Palace), decorated for Mexican Independence Day (16 September) festivities, in Etchojoa. The crowd is awaiting the traditional Grito de Dolores. (2007).

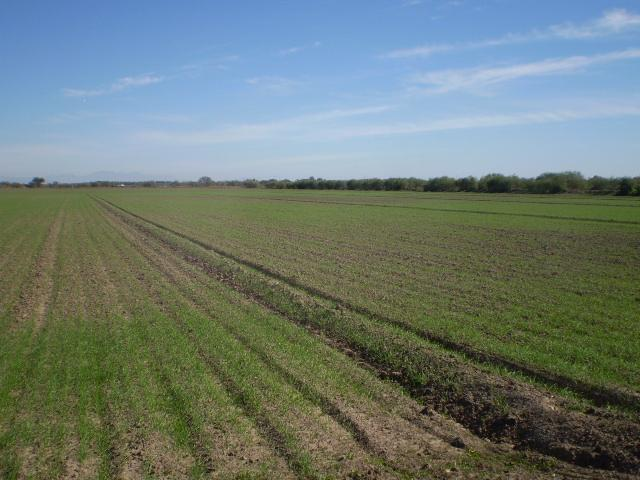
Fields in Etchojoa (2007).

Etchojoa is the seat of Etchojoa Municipality. Founded in 1613, Etchojoa is located in the southwest of the Mexican state of Sonora. It is situated at 26°52′N 109°39′W. The total municipal area is 1,220.23 km².

== History ==
Etchojoa was founded about 1614 as a Jesuit mission by the name of Espíritu Santo Etchojoa.

== Population ==
Etchojoa had a population of 56,129 in 2000, according to the official census. Neighboring municipalities are Navojoa, Huatabampo and Cajeme.

Etchojoa has a large indigenous population made up of the Mayo Indians, almost 20% of the population in 2000. The municipality sits in the Valle Mayo (Mayo Valley), named for the Río Mayo, a vital source for irrigation.

== Economy ==
The economy is based primarily on agriculture, with over 800 km² irrigated throughout the municipality in 2000. Fifty percent of the land is part of the ejido system. Wheat, soy, corn, and citrus fruit are the most important crops.

== Media ==
XEETCH-AM, a government-run indigenous community radio station that broadcasts in Mayo, Yaqui and Guarijio, is based in Etchojoa.
