= National Institute of Indigenous Peoples =

Mexican government agency

- Tzotzil: Instituto Ta Sjunul Jlumaltik Sventa Batsi Jnaklometik; Q’eqchi’: Molam Tk’anjelaq Chi Rixeb’ Laj Ralch’och’ Chocholtec: Ncha ndíe kie tía ndie xadë Ndaxingu; Awakatek: Ama’l Iloltetz e’ Kmon Qatanum; Ixil: Jejleb’al Unq’a Tenam Kumool

Agency overview
- Formed: 4 December 2018
- Preceding agency: CDI
- Headquarters: Mexico City
- Agency executive: Adelfo Regino Montes

The National Institute of Indigenous Peoples (Spanish: Instituto Nacional de los Pueblos Indígenas, INPI, Tzotzil: Instituto Ta Sjunul Jlumaltik Sventa Batsi Jnaklometik, Q'eqchi': Molam Tk’anjelaq Chi Rixeb’ Laj Ralch’och’, Ixil: Jejleb’al Unq’a Tenam Kumool, Chocholtec: Ncha ndíe kie tía ndie xadë Ndaxingu, Awakatek: Ama’l Iloltetz e’ Kmon Qatanum) is a decentralized agency of the Mexican Federal Public Administration. It was established on December 4, 2018, though the earliest Mexican government agency for indigenous matters was created in 1948. It is headquartered in Mexico City and headed by Adelfo Regino Montes.

== History ==
=== National Indigenist Institute ===
The National Indigenist Institute (Spanish: Instituto Nacional Indigenista) was established in 1948, with the initial goal of integrating indigenous people into the national culture. The agency carried out health and education campaigns, and it also relocated more than 22,000 people displaced by the construction of the Miguel Alemán Dam in Oaxaca. Three years later, it established the first Indigenous Coordination Center, at San Cristóbal de las Casas, Chiapas. In the 1970s, the focus of the agency shifted to "elevating" the life of indigenous people to help them participate in the national life, and later to assisting them while protecting their right to preserve their ethnic identity.

=== National Commission for the Development of Indigenous Peoples ===
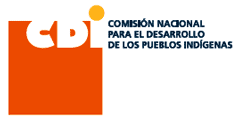
National Commission for the Development of Indigenous Peoples logo used during the government of Felipe Calderón

On May 21, 2003, the Act on the National Commission for the Development of Indigenous Peoples (Spanish: Ley de la Comisión Nacional para el Desarrollo de los Pueblos Indígenas) created a new agency, the National Commission for the Development of Indigenous Peoples (Spanish: Comisión Nacional para el Desarrollo de los Pueblos Indígenas), which took on all of the CDI's functions and responsibilities.

=== National Institute of Indigenous Peoples ===
Incoming president Andrés Manuel López Obrador announced on August 14, 2018, that the CDI would be replaced with a new National Institute of Indigenous Peoples, announcing Adelfo Regino Montes, the former secretary of indigenous matters in the state government of Oaxaca.

On December 4, 2018, the National Institute of Indigenous Peoples Law (Spanish: Ley del Instituto Nacional de los Pueblos Indígenas) was promulgated.

== Mission ==
The National Institute of Indigenous Peoples is recognized as "the authority of the Federal Executive in matters related to indigenous and Afro-Mexican peoples", creating, defining, executing and coordinating policies and programs to guarantee their rights, as well as their integral and sustainable development and the strengthening of their cultures and identities, in accordance with Article 2 of the Political Constitution of the United Mexican States.

Logo of the National Institute of Indigenous Peoples

== Operations ==
The INPI operates in 24 states through 10 Coordinating Centres for Indigenous Development; a Research, Information, and Documentation Centre; and 28 Regional Indigenous Development Centres. It maintains a network of 1085 school hostels (albergues escolares), used to provide mid-week accommodation for pupils for whom it is too far to travel to school every day.

=== Broadcasting ===
The National Institute of Indigenous Peoples operates the Cultural Indigenous Broadcasting System, which operates 21 radio stations primarily transmitting on AM frequencies and four low-power stations at Mayan schools in the state of Yucatán. The first station, XEZV-AM in Tlapa de Comonfort, Guerrero, signed on in 1979.
