= Ihuatzio (archaeological site) =

Archaeological site in Michoacán, Mexico

Ihuatzio archaeological site
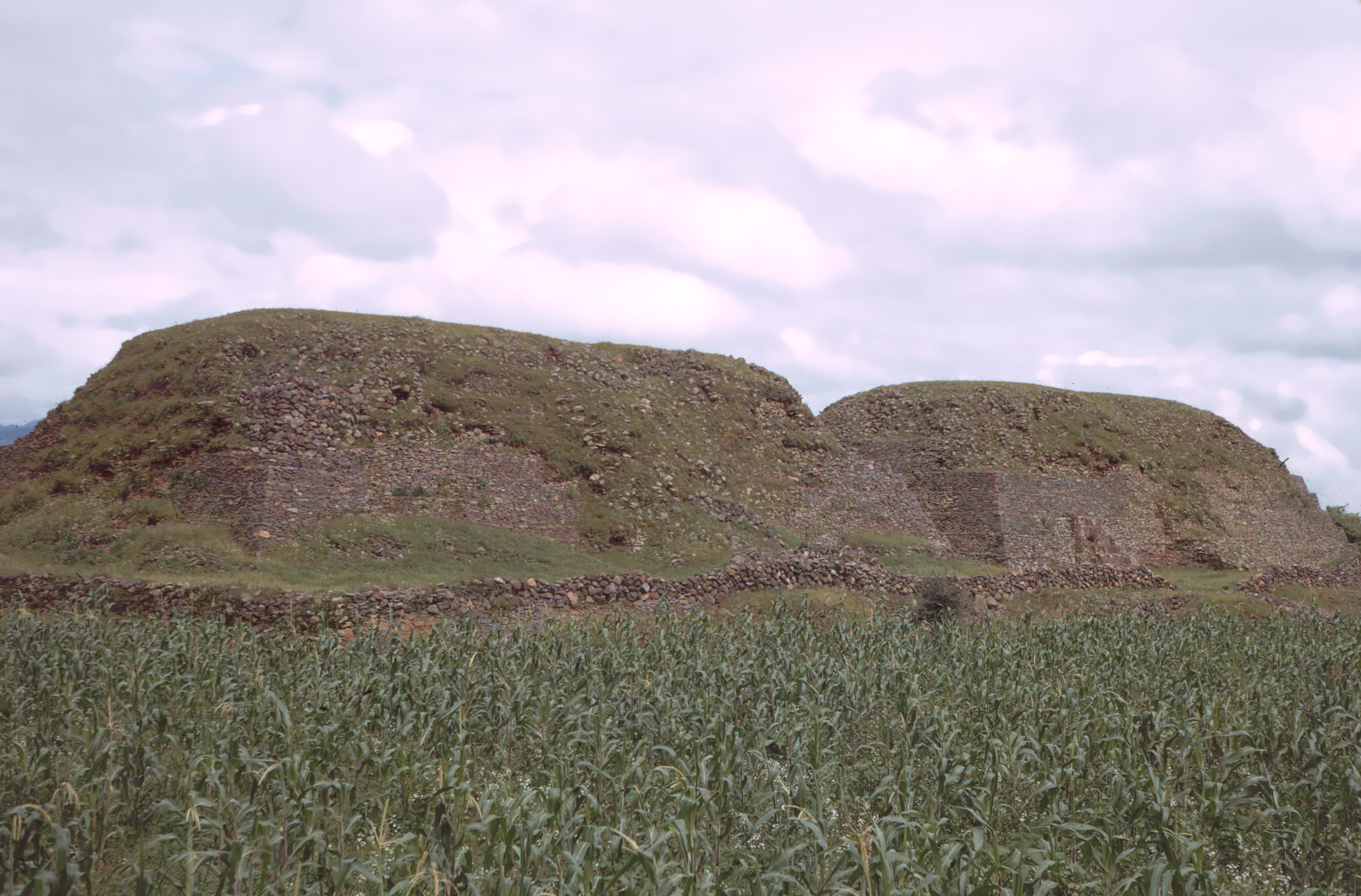
- Twin pyramids
- Interactive map of Ihuatzio archaeological site
- 19°34′41″N 101°37′20″W
- Type: Mesoamerican archaeology
- Periods: Mesoamerican: Preclassical, Classical and Postclassical
- Cultures: Toltec and Purépecha cultures
- Location: Tzintzuntzan, Michoacán; Mexico
- Region: Mesoamerica

History
- Built: First occupation: 900–1200 CE; second: 1200–1530 CE

Site notes
- Website: Ihuatzio Archaeological Site INAH Web Page

Ihuatzio is an archaeological site in Michoacán state, Mexico. It is at the southern slopes of Cerro Tariaqueri, just north of the Ihuatzio town, in the Tzintzuntzan municipality.

The ancient site is some 7 kilometers south-east of Tzintzuntzan, on the south-eastern shore of the Lake Pátzcuaro. Human settlements vestiges are registered from two different occupational periods; the first occurred between 900 and 1200 CE, corresponding to Nahuatl language-speaking groups; the second group corresponding to the maximum development reached by the Purépecha culture, between 1200 and 1530 CE.

This archaeological site was built on an artificially leveled plateau, and it is considered very important, for the Michoacán prehispanic history, it was an astronomical observatory and ceremonial center. Although it is relatively small, the pyramids dedicated to "Curicaueri" and "Xaratanga" are remarkable. A sculpture representing a chac-mool (characteristic of the Toltec culture) was found; as well as a series of roads and walls surrounding the site.

The prehispanic settlement fully covers a low-lying plateau and kept a strategic location at the extreme west of the lake and other dominant sites as Tzintzuntzan.

On 29 July 2024, one of the pyramids was heavily damaged from the effects of an unusually intense rainstorm, exacerbated by structural weaknesses resulting from prior conditions of drought and high temperatures. Officials expressed that they would be attempting to restore the ancient monument to preserve the region's "cultural heritage".

== Background ==
According to the archaeological evidence, there has been human habitation within the territory of Michoacán state for at least 10,000 years. In prehispanic times there were a number of migration waves into the area including the Pirinda, Nahua, Huetamo, Colima, Purépecha and other peoples. There are sites of formal settlements from all Mesoamerican period. Important sites include El Opeño and those in Curutarán, Tepalcatepec Apatzingán, Zinapécuaro, and Coalcoman. The territory has been inhabited by the Nahuas, Otomis, Matlatzincas, Pirindas, and Tecos, as well as the Purépecha.

The main pre-Hispanic civilization of the state is that of the Purépecha, which was centered in the Lake Pátzcuaro area. Before the 13th century, both Nahua and Purépecha peoples were here, sustaining themselves by agriculture and fishing. The Purépecha are descendants of a late arrival of Chichimecas who came from the north. At Lake Pátzcuaro, they came upon people with similar cultures to their own but who were more technically and socially advanced. The formation of the Purépecha state began in the 13th century, when these people started their own dominion at Uayameo, today Santa Fe de la Laguna and becoming dominant over the entire Lake Pátzcuaro area by the 15th century. Conquest of neighboring tribes and territories occurred between 1401 and 1450, absorbing peoples with different cultures and languages into the empire. By the late 15th century, this state rivaled that of the Aztecs, expanding their territory over much of what is now Michoacán and into part of Colima, Nayarit, Querétaro, Guanajuato, Guerrero, and Jalisco. The Aztecs attempted to invade Purépecha but were repelled. This would later cause the Purépecha to deny the Aztecs aid in the defense of Tenochtitlan against the Spanish.

The history of Michoacán has been studied from archaeological remains and other historical resources, such as the literary work Relación de Michoacán written in 1542, and it is known that the first settlers of the state were several Chichimeca tribes which arrived in different epochs and consequently evolved differently.

The archaeological sites found in the state, have helped clarify the history of the birth and development of ethnic groups which provided the essence of the Michoacán culture, dating back to the formative or Preclassical period (1500 to 200 BCE), the classical (800 BCE to 800 CE), and Postclassical (800 to 1000 CE), among whose sites include El Opeño, Curutarán, la Villita, Tepalcatepec, Apatzingán, Zinapécuaro, Coalcomán, San Felipe de los Alzati, Tzintzuntzan, Tingambato, Pátzcuaro, Zacapu, Uruapan, Tzitzio, and many others.

The territory of Michoacán was inhabited by the Purépecha people, who developed as a dominant culture, imposing their economic, religious, military, and cultural hegemony on other ethnic groups who also inhabited the region, such as the Nahua, Otomi, Matlatzincas or Pirindas, and Tecos. In the region, in addition to the Tarascan or Purépecha language, Coacomeca, Xilotlazinca, Colimote, Pirinda, Mazahua, Sayulteco, Nahuatl, and Teca were spoken.

The area has been inhabited at least since the early Pre-classic period. Early lithic evidence from before 2500 BCE like fluted points and stone utensils are found at some Megafauna kill sites. The earliest radio-carbon dates of archaeological sites fall around 1200 BCE. The best known early preclassical culture of Michoacán was the Chupicuaro culture. Chupícuaro sites are mostly found on lake islands which can be seen as a sign of it having traits relating it to the later Tarascan cultural patterns. In the early Classical period, ballcourts and other artifacts demonstrate a Teotihuacan influence in the Michoacán region.

In Michoacán there are over 45 known archaeological sites although only seven are open to the public, among these are Tzintzuntzan, Ihuatzio and Tingambato, which represent the rich Purépecha culture, although it is known that remains of previous cultures are hidden under the bases of these and other ceremonial centers.

The Purépecha people dominated a large territory that included areas within the modern-day states of Michoacán, Guanajuato, Querétaro, part of Jalisco, and Guerrero. They were an indomitable race that resisted the onslaught of the Aztecs, who could never dominate them, but who, due to their astronomical predictions, voluntarily submitted to the Spanish dominion, willingly converting to Christianity.

=== Toponymy ===
The Ihuatzio name comes from the Purépecha language word Hihuatsi, which means "Coyotes Place".

From information in the Relación de Michoacan, the place is also known by its Nahuatl name as Cuyacan or Cuyuacan (Coyoacan), and it is first mentioned when Tariácuri plans his attack on Tariaran.

=== Lake Patzcuaro ===
Lake Pátzcuaro lies in an endorheic basin, which does not drain to the sea. Lake Pátzcuaro basin is of volcanic origin. At times it has been part of an open and continuous hydrological system formed by Lake Cuitzeo, Pátzcuaro and Lake Zirahuén, which drained into the Lerma River. Today, like lakes Cuitzeo and Zirahuén, it is a closed basin, although ecologists consider it a sub-basin of the Lerma-Chapala basin.

The Lake Pátzcuaro basin is home to the Purépecha people. Purépecha leaders established the basin as the heartland of the Tarascan state, which rivaled the Aztec Empire before the Spanish conquest. The towns of Ihuatzio, Tzintzuntzan, and Pátzcuaro were important Tarascan centers.

=== Purépecha language ===
The Purépecha language is a language isolate, not known to be related to any other language. It is spoken in the State of Michoacán, near Lake Pátzcuaro and the Parícutin volcano. There are two major variants and perhaps 12 minors; the main language stream occurs between the lake and the volcanic plateau. Speakers easily identify others origin from their speech, and even the village of origin. They are proud to continue speaking their native language, even if they live elsewhere. However, dialectal differences are relatively recent, and speakers consider all variants as part of the same language.

Theories about the Purépecha origin vary. Some say that they came from the north with the Aztecs; others claim they came from the south and perhaps related to the Quechua from Ecuador, Bolivia and Peru. While their language is isolated, it shares some features with the Zuni and quechua (perhaps not more than borrowed features).

Greenberg assigned it to the Chibchan language family, but this proposal was rejected by specialists. Statistical studies by Swadesh have suggested relationships to Zuñi, Quechua, Mayan and Aymara, but these conclusions remain unproven.

=== Tarascan State ===
The Tarascan state was a prehispanic Mesoamerican empire, roughly covering the geographic area of the present-day Mexican state of Michoacán. In Purépecha, language of the Purépecha, the name of the state was Iréchecua Tzintzuntzáni, the "lands of Tzintzuntzan".

The Purépecha were a nomadic group that arrived in the basin of Lake Pátzcuaro. Their place of origin is unknown; however, it is known that their food and livelihood depended on their hunter-gatherer activities. The main events of society tarascan are described in the aforementioned Relacion de Michoacan; this 16th-century document mentions the Tarascan arrival at Zacapú, "Naranja de Tapia", where they established alliances through the marriage of Ireti-Ticátame ("guide and lord"), with a local woman. Later, they were forced to leave and headed towards the Patzcuaro Basin.

The people of the Tarascan empire were mostly of Purépecha ethnic affiliation but also included other earlier ethnic groups such as the Nahua, Otomi, Matlatzinca and Chichimec. These ethnic groups were gradually assimilated into the Purépecha majority group.

The Tarascan state was contemporary with and an enemy of the Aztec Empire, against which it fought many wars. The Tarascan Empire blocked Aztec expansion to the northwest, and the Tarascans fortified and patrolled their frontiers with the Aztecs, possibly developing the first truly territorial state of Mesoamerica.

Due to its relative isolation within Mesoamerica, the Tarascan state had many cultural traits completely distinct from those of the Mesoamerican cultural group. It is particularly noteworthy for being among the few Mesoamerican civilizations to use metal for tools and ornamentation.

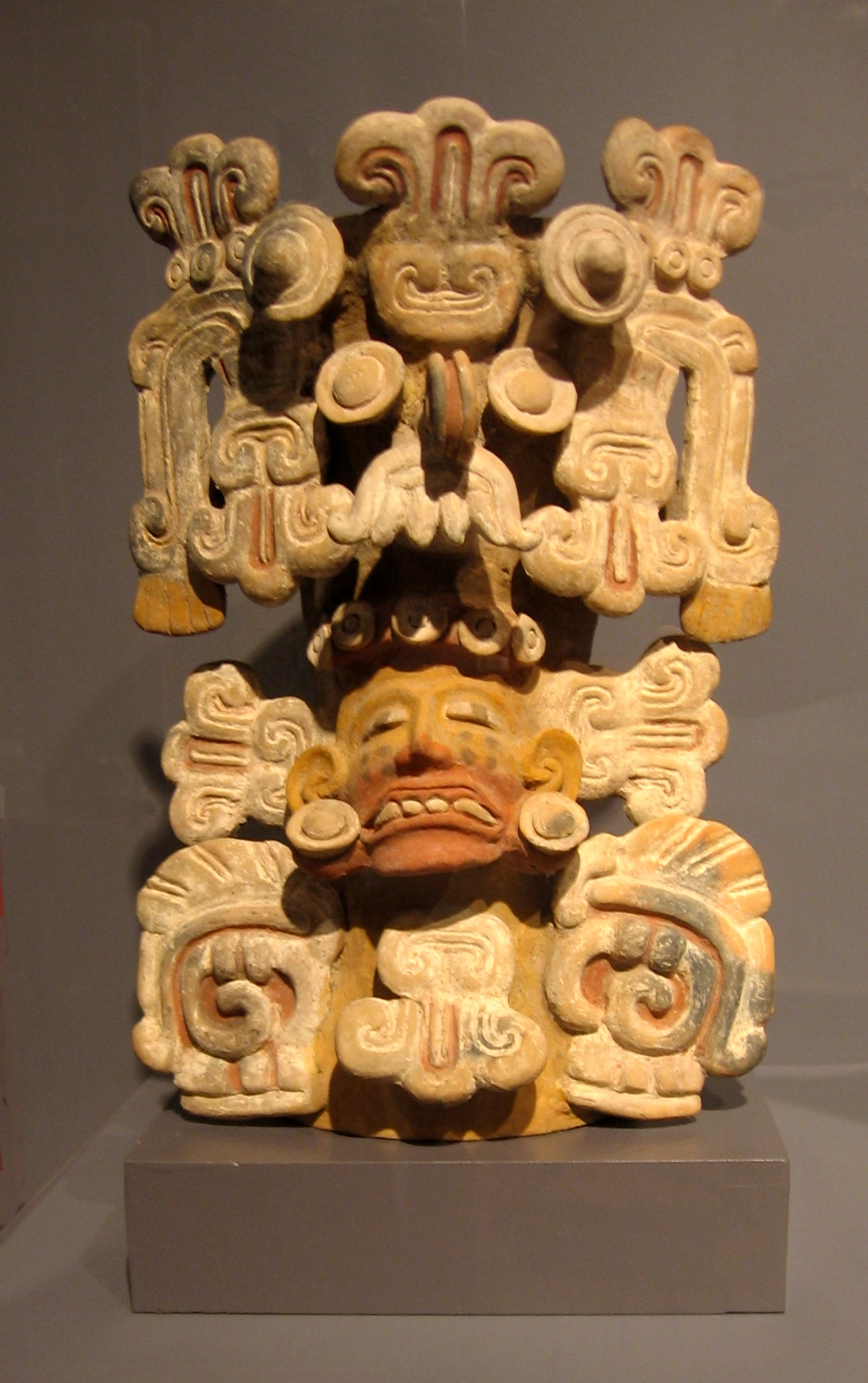
A Tarascan incense burner showing a deity with a "Tlaloc headdress" (ca 1350–1521 CE).

In the late Mesoamerican classical period, at least two non Purépecha ethnic groups lived around Lake Pátzcuaro: Nahuatl speakers in Jarácuaro, and some Chichimecan cultures on the northern banks, with the Nahua population being the second largest.

=== First occupation ===
A number of Nahua-speaking groups arrived to the area during the first stage. They already possessed a rudimentary food-production technology and probably had a sedentary mindset. Abundant food resources and other natural conditions were a determining factor in the formation and sustenance of the area's dense population. By the time of the second stage, the Tarascan group took control of a vast territory, settling in the Pátzcuaro watershed and setting up a tributary system based on their overwhelming military strength. Together with Tzintzuntzan and Pátzcuaro, Ihuatzio figured among the most important Tarascan settlements.

According to archaeologist Efraín Cárdenas, from archaeological evidence, the first occupation is tentatively chronologically located at between 900 and 1200 CE, corresponding to Nahuatl speaking groups.

=== Second occupation ===
During the second period the site is occupied by the Purépecha culture, according to archaeologist Efraín Cárdenas.

The second occupation period, chronologically placed at between 1200 and 1530 CE, corresponds to Tarascan domain, of the Lake Pátzcuaro basin and almost all the northern part of the State of Michoacán.

It is very difficult to establish the site construction chronology exclusively from archaeological data. The Relación de Michoacán mentions that upon the death of Tariácuri, the most outstanding character of narration, the political and religious power he had was divided into three lordships: Pátzcuaro, Ihuatzio and Tzintzuntzan. These were governed by three major characters: his youngest son Huiquingaje and nephews Hiripan and Tangaxoan.

This transcendental event of Tarascan (Purépecha) military and political development was described by Jerónimo de Alcalá testimony as follows:

... at the break of dawn, before daylight, Tariácuri climbed a mound called Thiapu, he cleared a section and made three dirt piles, he placed atop each a stone and an arrow. His nephews climbed the mound...[where Tariácuri stated:] Children hear me: look Hiripan, there will be three Lords. Yours is this pile which is in the middle, which is the village of Coyoacán [Ihuatzio]: and you Tangaxoán you're on this heap which is the village of Michoacán [Tzintzuntzan]; and you Huiquingaje, you're in this town is the village of Pátzcuaro. "Hence, there will be three Lords."

This event is very important to understand the growth and development of Ihuatzio, because of the initiative always shown by Hiripan during conquests, power again concentrated, but not in a particular person, but in a certain space: Ihuatzio. Radiocarbon dating place the site between 1510 and 1575 CE.

=== Investigations ===
The first reference of existence of archaeological vestiges in this place goes back to 1799 from a Bravo Ugarte description, who contributed information about the constructive system, mentioning that it reflected a low technological level since lime and sand were not used; nevertheless, he made references to large site dimensions.

Later, in 1855 friar Pedro Beaumont, in the Michoacán Chronicle, displays the first map of the Pátzcuaro Lake basin, with indication of the most important Tarascan establishments. Beaumont refers to Ihuatzio as one of the main tarascan establishments of the Pátzcuaro Lake basin.

In 1929, Marquina for the first time made a survey of the site surface, describing and making sketches of the rectangular base structures. According to him, Ihuatzio is composed of two main groups: a platform oriented north-south 400 meters long by 300 wide. This platform is delimited by wide walls remains. At the center are 3 yácatas facing east. To the north of this platform is another one of smaller dimensions (300 by 180 meters) oriented east-west, also limited on its larger sides by tall staggered walls 10 meters wide that form a 223-by-147-meter (732 by 482 ft) plaza. This plaza has two rectangular structures, also facing east, seated on a common 87-by-37.5-meter (285 by 123 ft) platform.

Between 1937 and 1938, Caso and Acosta performed excavations, release and consolidation works of the base rectangular structures took place. During these works, the chacmool was found, a ritual element that denotes a cultural contact with Toltec sites such as Tula where this archaeological element constitutes a distinguishing characteristic.

Although the site was opened to the public in 1937–1938, a visitor's register was not started until 1994.

=== History ===
Historically speaking, Ihuatzio is mentioned as one of the three heads of the Purépecha or Tarascan Empire at the time when the group consolidated.

The activities performed by the Tarascan or P'urépechas at this site, were related to the economic and social organization of the different sectors of the prehispanic society and to activities of ritual and ceremonial character. This is deduced from archaeological findings, as well as written data available from sources during the Spanish conquest. These sources are; the Michoacán Chronicle, the Jucutacato canvas and the ceremonies and rites relation of population and government of the Indians of the province of Michoacán (simply known as Relation of Michoacán).

As noted, Tariácuri explained to his nephews how they will attack the town of Hiuacha (Tariaran), and how Hiripan will become king of Cuyacan, Tangaxoan of Mechuacan (Tzintzuntzan) and his son Hiquingaje in Pátzcuaro. By then Hiripan, Tangaxoan and Hiquingaje had been living for some time in Tzintzuntzan. Hiripan spied on his enemies from the Tariacaherio hill, north of Ihuatzio, and there Curicaueri appeared before him on a dream and warned him that he will be king. When the Chichimeca attacked the Pacandan Isle people to obtain the first captives to be sacrificed in the Querétaro temple, Tariácuri orders his nephews to go to harata Hiuazi and Yuazi xanchacuyo from where they will attack the islanders, while working in farming lands near the shore of the lake (in a place called Araueni). It is possible that both sites were in or near what later would be Ihuatzio.

When Tariácuri dies, Hiripan follows his uncle orders, three kingdoms are formed and he constructed a house in Cuyacan. Later, when they begin to organize the territory that has been conquered, they decide to construct in Cuyacan a house for the God Curicaueri and to keep treasures obtained in the conquests there. From then on Cuyacan becomes the head of the kingdom. Hiripan was buried in Cuyacan and his son Ticatame succeeded him. During his reign, the head of the kingdom was transferred to Tzintzuntzan to where Zizispandaquare (son of Tangaxoan) moved Curicaueri together with the treasure.

In spite of having lost their position, Cuyacan continued being an important site. When they went to war, the Cuyacan lord was the one who harangued the soldiers and when they chose a new cazonci, he was one of the members of the group that met to discuss who would be the next king. In fact, Zinzicha considered Paquingata, lord of Cuyacan as a possible Cazonci, but he refused. Paquingata was grandson of Ticatame and son of Tucuruan.

== The site ==
Architecturally speaking, Ihuatzio is one of the most extensive and complex sites of the State of Michoacán. The archaeological remains are distributed in an approximate area of 50 hectares.

Unfortunately, as in most Mexican archaeological sites, not every area of monuments has been explored and therefore are only partially open to the public; the only sector that can be visited is known as "Plaza de Armas", where rectangular base pyramidal structures are located, placed on an also rectangular platform.

The prehispanic settlement fully covers a low-lying plateau and keeps a strategic location at the extreme west of the lake and other dominant sites as Tzintzuntzan. It is possible that Ihuatzio controlled this portion of the basin.

This site contains the best preserved monuments of the Michoacán Kingdom civilization depicting its greatness: a pyramid which served the natives as the main square; remains of a tower or fortress that was built (according to an ancient tradition) by the founder of the city in prehispanic times; some yácatas or kings tombs which have, where idols, decorations, weapons and vessels were uncovered; a well-constructed street or road, called Querendaro that served to communicate with Tzintzuntzan to the north.

=== Structures ===
The characteristic features of the Ihuatzio archaeological site are defensive-walls and walled roads. The first constitute a communication system between the main groups of constructions and access points to the site at prehispanic times. The second element, the roads, constitutes an interior road system, only that their functions could be diverse, as serving as a defense wall and limiting accesses to the site as well as internal communication.

==== Plaza de Armas ====
The Plaza de Armas is a huge rectangular, graded area bordered on the north and south ends by structures called wall-causeways which were used as roads. Ceremonial activities, rituals, and festivities were celebrated in the different parts of this square. Yet there is the possibility that some economic activities, such as marketing and exchange of goods, were also carried out here. It is even believed that it was sometimes used as a ball court playing field, as well.

The area open to the public, consists of a large quadrangular space bordered by two elements called "uatziris" (or Huatziris) by local people. These elements are wide staggered walls in both sides; access to the top side was by an embedded stairway. At the western end of the plaza a rectangular 1.5-meter-high (4.9 ft) platform was placed on which two plinths were constructed; these are described next.

==== Yácatas ====
Three Yácatas are located on a large plaza, south of the "Plaza de Armas", which is not yet open to the public. These buildings, whose foundation combines a rectangle with a semicircle, are characteristic of some purépecha sites of the 15th and 16th centuries. It had a stairway embedded in the center of the rectangular body. These three yácatas face west, on the semicircular part of their bodies, precisely in front of one of the mentioned wall-roads and constitute the communication system between the main building groups and the access points to the site at prehispanic times.

The Yácatas walls are built with horizontally set slabs which cover a rock and earth core. The outer coating consisted of Janamus blocks which once fully covered the structures but have since weathered completely. Some vestiges can be seen on the east face of rectangular structure no. 1.

==== Huatziri ====
The Huatziris or walled causeway (Muro-Calzada), is a most infrequent element in western Mexico's archaeology. It consists of a structure built with a system similar to that used in the rectangular buildings, namely, a rock and earth core covered by stone slabs. It displays a stuccoed-upper part, stepped tiers, and an average height of seven feet. It surrounds a large part of the settlement and had the dual function of road and entrance control.

The top of the wall was also finished and has staggered bodies, but it is smaller than the "Calzada del Rey" walls, described below, it measures 2.5 meters high average; this wall surrounds a large part of the settlement and had a double function, it served for roadway and also as a defensive element.

==== Platform ====
It is of rectangular base, constructed with a dirt and stone nucleus, covered with stone slabs without cement. Finishing was with stone xanamu carved blocks, of which only some samples are left. It measures 87 meters long; 37.5 wide and 1.5 high. The following structures were built on top.

==== Pyramidal foundations ====
These are two structures laid out east-west with stairways facing east. The construction consisted of a basalt stone nucleus, covered with stone slabs staggered walls, making up 11 bodies, finishing also consisted of Xanamu slabs. There are only remains of the stairways. Between these two structures there is a 1.65 meters wide passageway, where excavations unearthed human skeletons and the chac-mool sculpture.

==== Calzada del Rey ====
The "King Road" is a characteristic feature of this site, unique in prehispanic architecture not only of Michoacán but also of Western Mexico, are enormous constructions of approximately 250 meters long by 20 wide and more than 5 meters high, which are conformed by several overlaid bodies and located in the west and south sectors of the site. There is a flattened dirt floor on top, and are delimited by two small protective walls for pedestrian use. From their shape and displayed distribution in the landscape and because of the spaces that are communicated, it is assumed that they served as walkways used to transport the "Cazonzi" (Purépecha or Tarascan name for the king) from the ceremonial center to different points of the site.

==== Mirador ====
The south sector has another unique element, it consists of a circular base construction, cylinder shaped. This building, exclusive of the Ihuatzio archaeological site, does not display a well-defined access point and its precise function is not known. Nevertheless, given its strategic location, it is supposed it served as a cosmos observatory or viewpoint. The only certain fact is that there are no other similar structures in all of Michoacán, or registered sites in Guanajuato and Jalisco states.

== Other Purépecha archaeological sites ==
- El Cerrito
- El Torito
- La Plataforma
- Ranchito del Tecolote
- San Pedro Cucuchucho
- Yacatecharo
- El Opeño
- Curutarán
- Tepalcatepec
- Apatzingán
- Zinapécuaro
- Coalcoman

The territory was also inhabited by the Nahuas, Otomis and Matlatzinca

== See also ==
- Purepecha
- Tarascan state

== Bibliography ==
- Covarrubias, Miguel (1957). Indian Art of Mexico and Central America. New York: Alfred A. Knopf.
- Gorenstein, Shirley (1993). "Introduction". In Helen Perlstein Pollard (ed.). Taríacuri's Legacy: The Prehispanic Tarascan State. The Civilization of the American Indian series, vol. 209. Norman: University of Oklahoma Press. p. xiii–xx. ISBN 0-8061-2497-0. OCLC 26801144.
- Pollard, Helen Perlstein (1993). Taríacuri's Legacy: The Prehispanic Tarascan State. The Civilization of the American Indian series, vol. 209. Norman: University of Oklahoma Press. ISBN 0-8061-2497-0. OCLC 26801144.
- Pollard, Helen Perlstein (2003). "El gobierno del estado tarascano prehispanico". In Carlos Paredes Martínez; Marta Terán (eds.). Autoridad y gobierno indígena en Michoacán: ensayos a través de su historia. Colección Investigaciones series (in Spanish). Vol. 1. Zamora, Mexico: Colegio de Michoacán. pp. 49–60. ISBN 970-679-121-3. OCLC 55237579.
- Silverstein, Jay (2001). "The southeastern extent of Tarascan imperialism". Abstract of a paper presented at the 100th Annual Meeting of the American Anthropological Association, Washington, D.C.
- Warren, J. Benedict (1963). "The Caravajal Visitation: First Spanish Survey of Michoacán". Americas. 19 (4): 404–412. doi:10.2307/979507. JSTOR 979507. S2CID 147280962.
- Warren, J. Benedict (1985). The Conquest of Michoacán: The Spanish Domination of the Tarascan Kingdom in Western Mexico, 1521–1530. Norman: University of Oklahoma Press.
- Warren, J. Benedict (1970–1971). "Fray Jerónimo de Alcalá: Author of the Relación de Michoacán?". Americas. 27 (3): 307–327. doi:10.2307/980251. JSTOR 980251. S2CID 147436609.
- Weaver, Muriel Porter (1993). The Aztecs, Maya, and Their Predecessors: Archaeology of Mesoamerica (3rd ed.). San Diego, CA: Academic Press. ISBN 0-12-739065-0. OCLC 25832740.
- [ALCALÁ, Jerónimo de (circa 1540) "Relación de Michoacán" (2003) Leoncio Cabrero Fernández, Madrid, ed. Dastin ISBN 84-492-0371-6 edición en línea arte Historia Junta de Castilla y León, consultado el 31 de enero de 2009]
- [Bonavit, Julián. 1908 "Objetos arqueológicos encontrados en Ihuatzio" en Boletín de la Sociedad Michoacana de Geografía y Estadística, IV, pp. 176–213.] (in Spanish)
- [Bravo Ugarte, José (ed.) 1960 Inspección ocular en Michoacán, regiones central y sudeste, México, Editorial Jus, S.A. (Testimonia Histórica 2)] (in Spanish)
- [Cárdenas, Efraín. 1991 Proyecto Ihuatzio, Archivo Técnico de la Coordinación Nacional de Arqueología, INAH.] (in Spanish)
- [Cárdenas, Efraín. 1992 Informe de las exploraciones realizadas en Ihuatzio, Michoacán, 1991, Informe en el Archivo Técnico de la Coordinación Nacional de Arqueología, INAH, 11 p., 1 dib., 23 fotos.] (in Spanish)
- [Cárdenas, Efraín. 1993 Informe. Proyecto Ihuatzio, Michoacán. Segunda temporada, Informe en el Archivo Técnico de la Coordinación Nacional de Arqueología INAH, 26 p., 2 croquis, 8 dib., 28 fotos.] (in Spanish)
- [Cárdenas, Efraín. 2004 "Jiuatsio, la casa del coyote" en Efraín Cárdenas García (coord.), Tradiciones arqueológicas, México, El Colegio de Michoacán, A.C., Gobierno del Estado de Michoacán, pp. 195–215.] (in Spanish)
- [Caso, Alfonso. 1930 "Informe preliminar de las exploraciones realizadas en Michoacán" en Anales del Museo Nacional de Arqueología, Historia y Etnografía, época IV, v. VI, n. 2, pp. 446–452.] (in Spanish)
- [Du Solier, Wilfrido. 1936 Informe sobre las zonas arqueológicas de Copalilla, Ihuatzio, Zacapu y La Angostura, Michoacán, Informe en el Archivo Técnico de la Coordinación Nacional de Arqueología, INAH.] (in Spanish)
- [León, Nicolás. 1903 "Los tarascos, notas históricas, etnográficas y antropológicas, segunda parte. Etnografía precolombina" en Anales del Museo Nacional de México, 2a época, t. I, pp. 392–502.] (in Spanish)
- [Lumholtz, Carl. 1986 [1904] El México desconocido, México, Instituto Indigenista (Clásicos de la Antropología, colección INI, 11), facsímil, 2 t.] (in Spanish)
- [Marquina, Ignacio. 1929 Informe acerca del estudio de las yácatas al norte del pueblo de Ihuatzio, lago de Pátzcuaro, Michoacán, Informe en el Archivo Técnico de la Coordinación Nacional de Arqueología, INAH.] (in Spanish)
- [Ponce de León Contreras, Aura Leticia. 1993 La zona arqueológica de Ihuatzio, Michoacán. Un estudio básico para su protección, tesis para obtener el grado de licenciada en Arqueología por la Escuela Nacional de Antropología e Historia.] (in Spanish)
- [Rubín de la Borbolla, Daniel. 1939 "Antropología Tzintzuntzan-Ihuatzio" en Revista Mexicana de Estudios Antropológicos, 3, pp. 99–121.] (in Spanish)
- Chamoreau, C. 2009. Hablemos Purépecha. Morelia, Mexico: Universidad Intercultural Indígena de Michoacán. ISBN 978-607-424-042-9. [Revised and enlarged Spanish language translation of the above]
- De Wolf, Paul. 1989. Estudios Lingüísticos sobre la lengua P'orhé. Mexico City: Colegio de Michoacán.
- De Wolf, Paul. 1991. Curso básico del tarasco hablado. Zamora: Colegio de Michoacán. ISBN 968-7230-61-4.
- Foster, Mary LeCron. 1969. The Tarascan Language. Berkeley: University of California Press. University of California publications in linguistics; 56.
- Foster, Mary LeCron. 1971. "Tarascan". In Jesse Sawyer, ed., Studies in American Indian Languages. Berkeley: University of California Press.
- Friedrich, Paul. 1984. "Tarascan: From Meaning to Sound". In Munro Edmonson, ed., Supplement to the Handbook of Middle American Indians, Vol. 2. Austin: University of Texas Press.
- Greenberg, Joseph. 1987. Language in the Americas. Stanford: Stanford University Press.
- Hernández Dimas, Ma. Guadalupe, et al. 1999. [www.uarhi.org/documentos/curso%20p'ure.doc Curso de lengua p'urhépecha]. Mexico City: UNAM.
- Monzón, Cristina. 1997. Introducción a la lengua y cultura tarascas. Valencia, Spain: Universidad de Valencia. ISBN 84-370-3307-1.
- Pahuamba, Juan Velázquez, et al. 1997. Vocabulario práctico bilingüe p'urhépecha-español. (Introductory section online). Dirección General de Culturas Populares. Dirección General de Culturas Populares, PACMyC.
