= Angamuco =

- Location within Mexico
- 19.5840293°N 101.4948909°W
- Cultures: Purépecha civilization
- Location: Mexico

History
- Built: circa 900 CE

Angamuco is the name given to a major urban settlement of the Purépecha civilization, (Tarascan) now in ruins hidden under vegetation, in the Lake Pátzcuaro Basin of Michoacán, Mexico, and discovered in 2007. In 2012, using LiDAR technology, archaeologist Christopher Fisher and team detected more than 40,000 foundations at the site, roughly the same as Manhattan, on a territory of approximately 25 square kilometres (9.7 sq mi) (less than half of Manhattan's 59 square kilometres (23 sq mi).

Analyzing architectural data Fisher found 60 distinctive, standardized, and recurrent architectural forms throughout the site, including commoner and elite buildings, altars, pyramids, storage facilities, ball courts, and a hierarchical road system. The most common types of structures are living spaces for both commoners and elites, including small platforms for houses and rectangular and circular walled rooms. The second most common features are structures for public or ritual activities, such as pyramids, plazas, and a ball court. Finally, a small part are structures associated with agriculture activities such as patios or terraces. The diverse range of structures at Angamuco suggests a large, active, and organized population embedded within an extensive human modified landscape.

Fisher believes the settlement was founded around 900 CE and reached peak importance from around 1000 to around 1350 CE with a population of over 100,000 – making it the most populous city in western Mexico at the time, and spanning a wider area than the Purépecha capital, Tzintzuntzan.
