= Tangaxuan II =

16th-century monarch of the Purépecha Empire; executed by Spanish conquistadors

- Cazonci of the Purépecha Empire
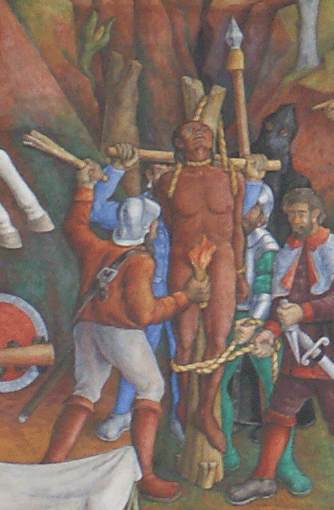
- Tangaxuan II being executed, painted by Juan O'Gorman
- Reign: 1520–February 14, 1530
- Predecessor: Zuangua
- Successor: Nuño de Guzmán as Governor of Nuevo Galicia
- Born: unknown Tzintzuntzan, Purépecha Empire, Mexico
- Died: February 14, 1530; Nueva Galicia

Tzimtzincha-Tangaxuan II (died February 14, 1530) was the last cazonci (monarch) of the Purépecha Empire, ruling from 1520 to 1530. He was baptized Francisco when his realm made a peace treaty with Hernán Cortés. He was executed by burning by Nuño Beltrán de Guzmán on February 14, 1530.

After hearing about the fall of the Aztec Empire, Tangáxuan II sent emissaries to the Spanish victors. A few Spaniards returned with them to Tzintzuntzan where they were presented to Tangáxuan and gifts were exchanged. The Spaniards returned with samples of gold and Cortés' interest in the Purépecha state was awakened. In 1522 a Spanish force under the leadership of Cristóbal de Olid was sent into Purépecha territory and arrived at Tzintzuntzan within days. The Purépecha army numbered many thousands, perhaps as many as 100,000, but at the crucial moment they chose not to fight. Tangáxuan submitted to the Spanish administration, but for his cooperation was allowed a large degree of autonomy. This resulted in a strange arrangement where both Cortés and Tangáxuan considered themselves rulers of Michoacán for the following years: the population of the area paid tribute to them both.

Nuño Beltrán de Guzmán, then president of the first Audiencia decided to march on northwestern Mexico with a force of 5,000–8,000 men in search for new populations to subdue. When he arrived in Michoacán and found out that Tangáxuan was still de facto ruler of his empire, he allied himself with a Purépecha noble Don Pedro Panza, known as Cuinierángari, against the Cazonci. The Cazonci was tried for plotting a rebellion, withholding tribute, sodomy and heresy, and he was tortured and executed. His ashes were thrown into the Lerma river. A period of violence and turbulence began. During the next decades, Purépecha puppet rulers were installed by the Spanish government.

According to legends, Tangaxuan II was the father of Princess Eréndira, although there are no contemporary accounts of her existence.

== Notes ==
Preceded by Zuangua	Cazonci of the Purépecha Empire; 1520–1530	Succeeded by Province of Nueva Galicia
