= Cutzamala =

Cutzamala may refer to:

- Cutzamala de Pinzón, municipality and township in the state of Guerrero, Mexico
- Cutzamala (Mesoamerican site), a pre-Columbian Mesoamerican archaeological site, a fortified garrison settlement in the Postclassic-era Tarascan state
- Cutzamala River, a river in the state of Guerrero, Mexico
