= Hiripan =

Cazonci of the Irechikwa Ts'intsuntsani
- Reign: circa. C.E.1420?—C.E.1435
- Predecessor: Hiquingaje
- Successor: Tangáxuan I

Hiripan was the third Cazonci of the Irechikwa Ts'intsuntsani in Mesoamerica, in what is now Mexico. He was the nephew of Tariácuri. It is unknown when his rule began, but it ended around ~C.E.1435.
