= Tangáxuan I =

Cazonci of the Irechikwa Ts'intsuntsani
- Reign: (C.E.1435–1454)
- Predecessor: Hiripan
- Successor: Tzitzipandáquare

Tangáxuan I was the fourth Cazonci of the Irechikwa Ts'intsuntsani in Mesoamerica, in what is now Mexico. He was the nephew of Tariácuri. His rule began around ~C.E.1435 and ended in 1454.
