= Helen Perlstein Pollard =

American academic

Helen Perlstein Pollard (born September 4, 1946) is an American academic ethnohistorian and archaeologist, known for her publications and research on pre-Columbian cultures in the west-central Mexico region.

== Biography ==
As an undergraduate Pollard studied at Barnard College, a women's liberal arts college in New York City affiliated with Columbia University, graduating in 1967. One of her contemporaries at Barnard, who graduated two years earlier, was Esther Pasztory, another Mesoamerican scholar who became renowned as an art historian and specialist in Teotihuacano art. Pollard obtained her PhD in anthropology in 1972, awarded by Columbia University, with a dissertation entitled "Prehispanic Urbanism at Tzintzuntzan, Michoacan".

Pollard's particular area of expertise is the study of the Tarascan state, a tributary state that flourished in the Postclassic period of Mesoamerican chronology in a region largely coinciding with the modern-day Mexican state of Michoacán. (Note: The Tarascan state bordered on and was a contemporary with the hegemonic Aztec Empire, and the two polities were frequently at war.) Drawing from her extensive archaeological fieldwork conducted in the Lake Pátzcuaro Basin, Pollard's research has investigated themes such as the formation of proto-states, the centralization of political control, development and emergence of social stratification and inequalities, and the human ecology of adaptations within pre-modern cultures in response to environmental changes and instabilities.

As of 2009 Pollard is an Emerita professor of the Department of Anthropology at Michigan State University (MSU). She currently resides in El Cerrito, California.

== Publications ==
- Pollard, Helen Perlstein (1993). Taríacuri's Legacy: The Prehispanic Tarascan State. The Civilization of the American Indian series, vol. 209. Norman: University of Oklahoma Press. ISBN 0-8061-2497-0. OCLC 26801144.
