= Tariácuri =

Fourteenth-century Purépecha ruler

Cazonci of the Purépecha Empire
- Reign: ca. 1350–1390
- Predecessor: Pauacume II
- Successor: Hiquingaje
- Born: before 1300; Michoacán, Mexico
- Died: c. 1350; Pátzcuaro, Mexico
- Issue: Hiquingaje
- Father: Pauacume II

Tariácuri (fl. ca. 1350–1390) was a culture hero of the Purépecha people and one of the foremost rulers of the Purépecha Empire. Traditionally hailed as the state's founder, Tariácuri is credited with growing the Purépecha Empire from an individual city-state to the dominant power of the region.

== Biography ==
Tariácuri (Purépecha: Tarhiakurhi meaning "strong wind") was born into the uacúsecha clan, one of the most powerful families of the Lake Pátzcuaro basin, in the fourteenth century CE. His father and predecessor, Pauacume II, ruled as the lord of Pátzcuaro.

Tariácuri's career originated after a prophetic dream in which the sun god Curicaueri, the patron deity of the uacúsecha, sent him forth to create and expand a unified Purépecha state. To put this ambition into practice, he first joined forces with allied cities, including Urichu, Erongarícuaro, Pechátaro, and Jarácuaro. He then began expanding the state's territory, first to the southwest and then throughout the entire Pátzcuaro basin. Tariácuri's military record was not perfectly successful – at one point, "enemies from Curinguaro" are described as attacking his homeland and forcing his nephews into flight – but this seems to have been a temporary setback, after which Tariácuri managed to resume his program of expansion.

After Tariácuri's death, his domain was divided among several of his descendants: his son Hiquingaje received rulership of Pátzcuaro, while Tariácuri's nephews Tangaxoan and Hiripan were granted Tzintzuntzan and Ihuatzio respectively. They would follow Tariácuri's pattern, however, by maintaining an alliance and continuing efforts to expand the Purépecha state.

Preceded by Pauacume II	Cazonci of the Purépecha Empire ca. 1350	Succeeded by Hiquingaje
