= Shirley Gorenstein =

American Mesoamerican archaeologist

Shirley Slotkin Gorenstein
- Born: 1928
- Died: 2020 (aged 91–92)
- Education: Columbia University; Queens College, City University of New York
- Scientific career
- Workplaces: Columbia University; Rensselaer Polytechnic Institute
- Thesis: The differential development of military and political organization in prehispanic Peru and Mexico (1963)

Shirley Slotkin Gorenstein (1928 – 2020) was an American Mesoamerican archaeologist known for her research on premodern political and military systems, as well as for her institutional leadership in archaeology and science and technology studies. She was a faculty member in the Department of Anthropology at Columbia University. She founded the public archaeology program at Rensselaer Polytechnic Institute and was the founding chair of the Department of Science and Technology Studies.

== Early life and education ==
Gorenstein’s interest in anthropology began when she was a child. At the age of 17, she travelled to the Kahnawà:ke Reserve to study Mohawk ironworkers. She received a Bachelor of Arts in anthropology from Queens College, City University of New York in 1948, and moved to Columbia University for graduate studies. At Columbia, she earned a master’s degree in 1953 and a PhD in 1963. Her research involved library‑based comparative studies of Mesoamerican and Andean state development, with an emphasis on political and military organization.

== Research and career ==
Gorenstein joined the faculty at Columbia University, where she led the archaeological field research in Mexico. Supported by the National Science Foundation, she led an investigation of the Aztec fortress of Tepexi el Viejo. At the time, the site was extremely remote, and maps were inadequate. She located the fortress using surveying equipment borrowed from the Mexican National Astronomical Observatory. She also investigated Mesoamerican archaeology.

Gorenstein launched a research program focused on the Tarascan side of the Aztec–Tarascan military frontier. She started by identifying historically documented fortified sites along the northern boundary of the Aztec Empire in Guanajuato and Michoacán, and then completed a more intensive investigation of the site of Acámbaro. At the time, the National Science Foundation was only funding archaeological research focused on warfare during the Vietnam War, so Gorenstein secured funding from the Ford Foundation. Gorenstein directed an investigation into the Tarascan civilization and Purépecha Empire.

Gorenstein moved to the Rensselaer Polytechnic Institute, where she established a public archaeology program and founded and chaired the Department of Science and Technology Studies. She co‑organized a Wenner‑Gren Foundation–supported conference on the “Cultural Dynamics of Precolumbian West and Northwest Mexico”, which inspired a foundational text for the archaeology of the region.

From the mid‑1970s through to the early 1980s, Gorenstein served with the Association for Field Archaeology, the American Anthropological Association, and the American Association for the Advancement of Science. She chaired the American Anthropological Association’s Committee on the Status of Women in Anthropology.

== Personal life ==
Gorenstein was married to Sam Gorenstein, who died in 2005. She had two sons.

== Selected publications ==
- Gorenstein, Shirley (1973). "Tepexi el Viejo: A Postclassic Fortified Site in the Mixteca-Puebla Region of Mexico". Transactions of the American Philosophical Society. 63 (1): 1–75. doi:10.2307/1006249. JSTOR 1006249.
- Helen Perlstein Pollard; Shirley Gorenstein (1 July 1980). "Agrarian potential, population, and the tarascan state". Science. 209 (4453): 274–277. Bibcode:1980Sci...209..274P. doi:10.1126/science.209.4453.274. ISSN 0036-8075. PMID 17807116. Wikidata Q81104119.
- Pedro Carrasco; Shirley Gorenstein; Helen P. Pollard (1984). "Review: The Tarascan Civilization: A Late Prehispanic Cultural System". Ethnohistory (in undetermined language). 31 (4): 308. doi:10.2307/482721. ISSN 0014-1801. Wikidata Q124443793.
