= Tarascan Plateau =

Region in the state of Michocán, Mexico

- Plateau
- Interactive map of Tarascan Plateau
- Coordinates: 19°37′27″N 102°48′44″W

The Tarascan Plateau (Spanish: Meseta Tarasca), also Purépecha Plateau (Meseta Purépecha), is a plateau and region in the Mexican state of Michoacán, in Southwestern Mexico.

The plateau begins at the southwestern foot of the Trans-Mexican Volcanic Belt.

It is considered a region of temperate land, irrigated by the Lerma River and its tributaries.

It has several lakes, like Lake Pátzcuaro, Lake Cuitzeo, and Lake Zirahuén.

== History ==
The Tarascan Plateau has a strong indigenous peoples presence. The Purépecha were dedicated to agriculture and forestry.

It was the location of the Purépecha culture during the Mesoamerican Postclassical period. Some of its principal pre-Columbian and present day population centers were/are Pátzcuaro and Tzintzuntzan.
