= Tzitzipandáquare =

Ruler of the Purépecha Empire from 1454 to 1479

Cazonci of the Purépecha Empire
- Reign: 1454–1479
- Predecessor: Tangáxuan I
- Successor: Zuangua

Tzitzipandáquare was the fifth cazonci of the Purépecha Empire in Mesoamerica, in what is now Mexico. He ruled from 1454 to 1479. Under his rule, the nation conquered parts of the Aztec Empire, up to Jiquipilco.
