= Hiquingaje =

Irecha of the Irechikwa Patskwarhuri
- Reign: c. C.E.1390–1420?
- Predecessor: Tariácuri
- Successor: Hiripan
- Died: C.E.1420
- Issue: Hiquingaje II; Other sons (names unknown)
- Father: Tariácuri

Hiquingaje I was the second Irecha of the Irechecua in Mexico, ruling from Patzcuaro. He was the son of its founder, Tariacuri, who possibly died around C.E.1420 None of his sons outlived him, as almost all were drunkards and he and Hiripan, king of Ihuatzio, executed them all. His last son, Hiquingaje II, was purportedly struck by lightning.

When Hiquingaje I died, his aforementioned second cousin Hiripan became Irecha, per the unique succession rules Tariacuri had put in place, where the three capitals of Patzcuaro, Ihuatzio and Tzintzuntzan would cycle rulership of the whole empire. Patzcuaro was absorbed into the realm of Ihuatzio as a result of this.

Preceded by Tariácuri	Irecha of the Irechikwa P'atskwarhuri; Later 14th century	Succeeded by Hiripan
