= Cutzamala (Mesoamerican site) =

Cutzamala is an archaeological site in the Mexican state of Guerrero. During the Postclassic period in Mesoamerican chronology the settlement of Cutzamala served as a garrison outpost of the Tarascan state, and according to ethnohistorical sources such as the Relaciones geográficas was stationed with a contingent of up to ten thousand Purépecha warriors during the period of conflict between the Purépecha and the Aztec Empire.
