= Tzintzuntzan, Michoacán =

Tzintzuntzan
- Town
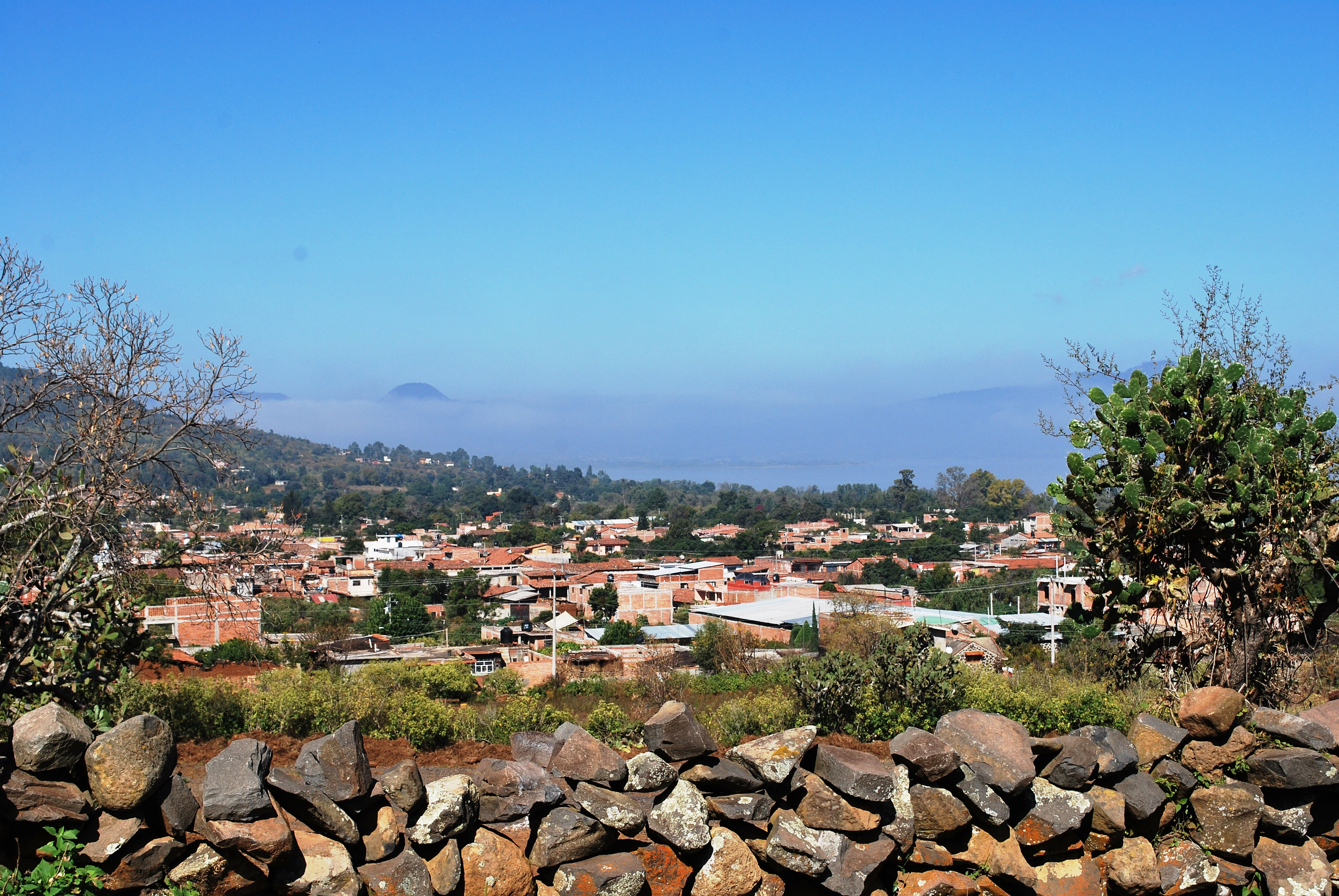
- View of the modern town from the archeological site

- Location in Mexico
- Coordinates: 19°37′42″N 101°34′44″W
- Country: Mexico
- State: Michoacán
- Founded: 12th century
- Municipal Status: 1930

Government
  - Municipal President: J. Abel Martinez Rojas (2008-2011)

Area
  - Total: 165.15 km^{2} (63.76 sq mi)
- Elevation (of seat): 2,050 m (6,730 ft)

Population (2005) Municipality
  - Total: 12,259
  - Seat: 3,252
- Time zone: UTC-6 (Central (US Central))

Tzintzuntzan (Spanish pronunciation: [tsin'tsuntsan]) is a town in Tzintzuntzan Municipality located in the north of Michoacán state, 53 km from the capital of Morelia and 17.5 km from Pátzcuaro, located on the northeast shore of Lake Pátzcuaro. It is best known as the former capital of the Tarascan state until it was conquered by the Spanish in the 1520s. Today, Tzintzuntzan is a small town with two major attractions, the archeological site of Tzintzuntzan and the former monastery complex of San Francisco. The municipality contains another important archeological site called Ihuatzio. It is also notable for its festivals, which include the Festival of Señor del Rescate, Day of the Dead celebrations and a cultural event related to New Year's.

== History ==
The name Tzintzuntzan comes from the Purépecha language, meaning "place of the hummingbirds". The Purépecha had a god named Tzintzuuquixu, meaning "hummingbird of the south", which, like the Mexica to Tenochtitlán, was involved in guiding the tribe to the Lake Pátzcuaro area. The municipality has a coat of arms which features images of Tarascan kings Tzintzincha, Chiguacua and Chiguangua. It also contains a section representing the Spanish conquest of the Tarascan state in the form of the last emperor Tzintzincha or Tanganxoán bowing before the Spanish Crown and cross, asking to be baptized.

The Purépecha were one of the tribes that arrived to the Pátzcuaro Lake area in the 12th century. From the 12th to the 14th century, the Purépecha came to dominate the region with their capital at Tzintzuntzan. In 1400, emperor Tariácuri divided it among his three descendants, Irepan, Hiquingare and Tanganxoán, with each receiving Pátzcuaro, Ihuatzio and Tzintzuntzan respectively. However, Tanganxoán managed to reunify the three, reabsorbing Ihuatzio and Pátzcuaro, returning Tzintzuntzan as the most powerful city in the lake region.

From 1450 to 1521, the Tarascan empire was not only able to hold off invasions by some of the Aztecs' most successful emperors such as Axayacatl, Ahuizotl and Moctezuma II, they inflicted heavy losses on invading Aztec armies and continued extending their dominion. In fact, until the Spanish arrival in the 1520s, the Purépecha had not known military defeat.

Tzintzuntzan was a large, prosperous city when the Spanish arrived to conquer the area in the 1520s. At that time, it was governed by Tanganxoán II, who was burned at the stake by Nuño de Guzmán in 1529. It was made the first capital city of Michoacán, until Vasco de Quiroga moved it to Pátzcuaro in 1539,(patz) which at the time was considered to be nothing more than a neighborhood of the powerful Tzintzuntzan. Although Tzintzuntzan was given the title of city in 1523, by 1539 it had lost its former splendor and economic importance. With the rise of neighboring Pátzcuaro, this area was all but abandoned. The land here was under the jurisdiction of Pátzcuaro until after the Mexican War of Independence, when it became part of the jurisdiction of Quiroga in 1831. Later, in honor to what it was, Tzintzuntzan was named a "Ciudad Primitiva" (Primitive City) in 1861. The modern town gained municipal status in 1930.

== Archeological site ==
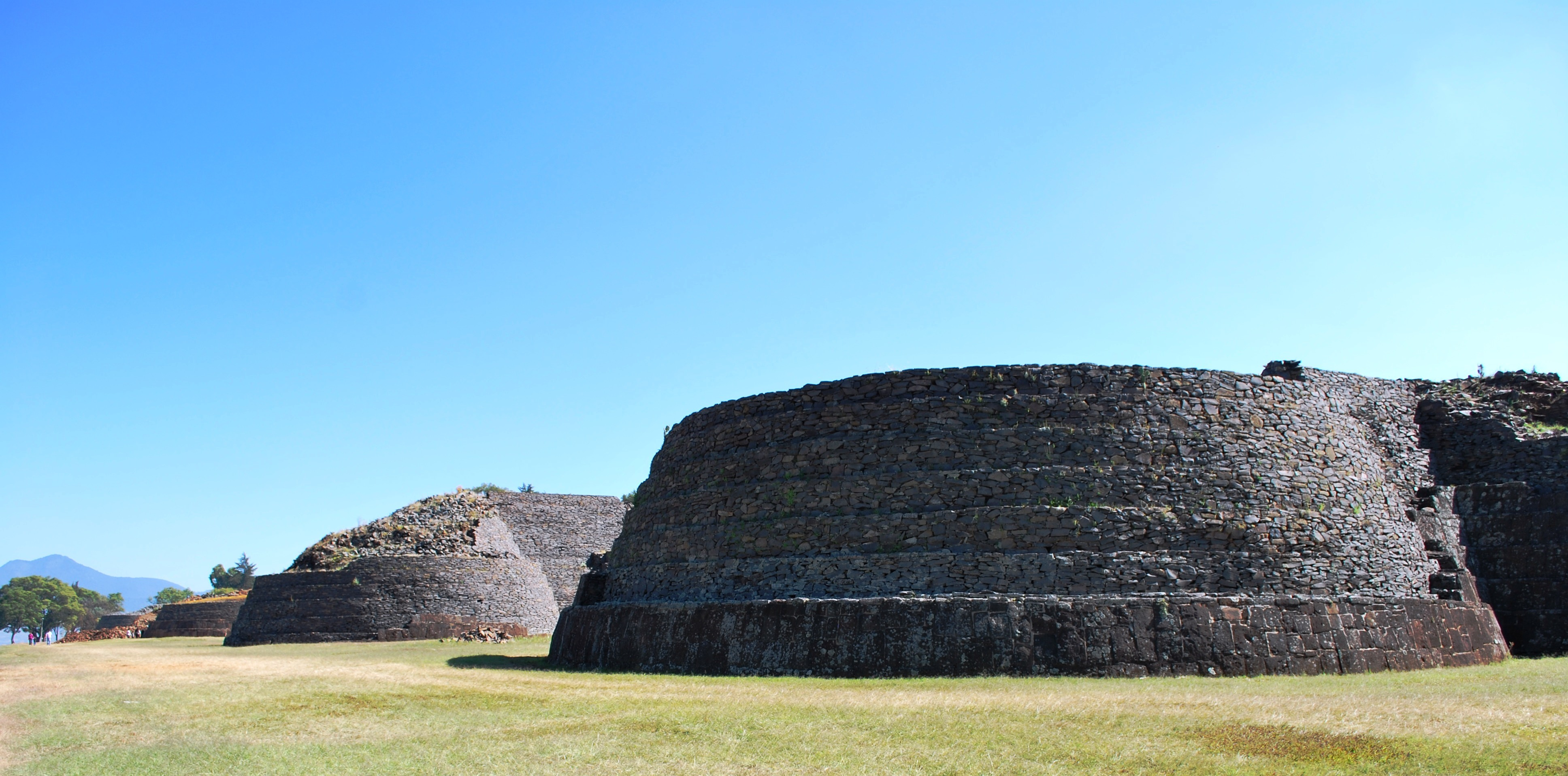
View of the yacatas

The pre-Hispanic city of Tzintzuntzan extended from Lake Pátzcuaro to the hills just to the east and had a population of between 25,000 and 30,000 when the Spanish arrived in the 1520s. The city lost most of its population after the Conquest, and what is now called the Tzintzuntzan archeological site is only the ceremonial center and is located one km east of the current center of the town. The site is located on a hill that overlooks the modern town and Lake Pátzcuaro. It is situated on a large artificial platform that was excavated into the side of the hill. The ceremonial center contains a large plaza and several buildings known to house priests and nobility, but the main attraction is the five yácatas or semi-circular pyramids that face out over the lake area. This ceremonial center was called Taríaran or "House of the Wind". On each of the yacatas was a temple made of wood, in which the most important rites of the Purépecha people and government took place, including burials, of which about sixty have been found. These are the best known Purépecha yacatas and are considered to be an icon of the region.

The first modern references to the yacatas of Tzintzuntzan date from 1855, when it was first identified as the capital of the ancient Tarascan state, but the ruins were not excavated until the 1930s. The Museo de Sitio de la Zona Arqueológica was inaugurated in 1992, with the aim of displaying artifacts found at the Tzintzuntzan site.

== Monastery of San Francisco ==
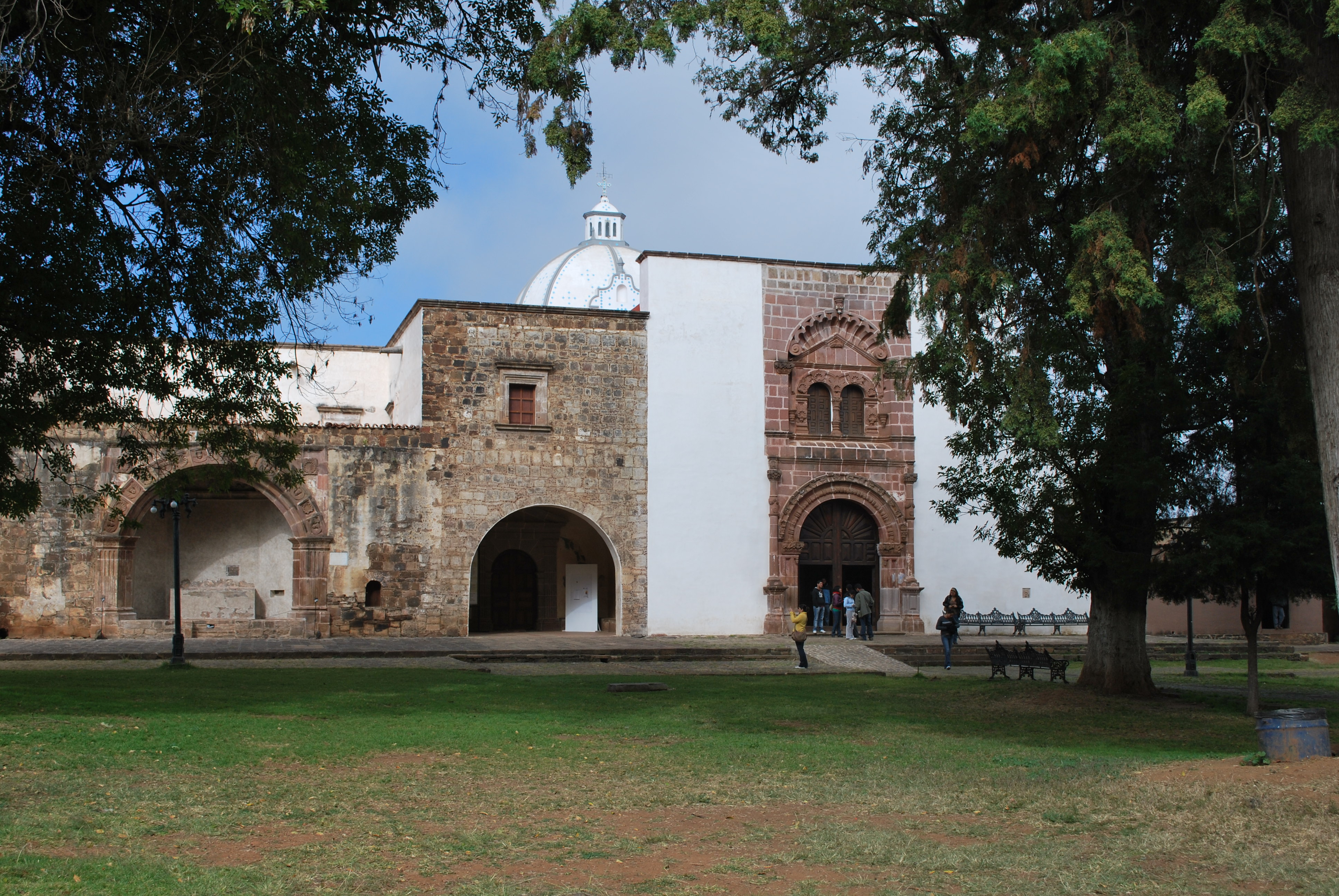
View of Church of San Francisco and its open chapel

The main attraction of the modern town is the former monastery complex of San Francisco, which was founded in the 16th century. The complex was designed and initiated in 1530 by Spanish architect (and Franciscan friar) Fray Pedro de Pila. The complex contains the Church of San Francisco, the Church of La Soledad, two open chapels and a large atrium, with much of the building material obtained from the nearby yacata pyramids that the Spanish destroyed. The Church of San Francisco is the first built and still conserves the arch that separates the presbytery from the nave, which was the original portal of the 16th century. Next to this portal is a small open chapel from the same time period. There is a plaque on this open chapel that states that it stands on the site of the first Mass to be celebrated in Michoacán. Inside the Church of La Soledad is the "Santo Entierro", which is a wax figure of Christ displayed in a glass coffin. It is believed (by Mexican folklore) that the arms and legs of this statue are growing. One end of the coffin has an extension added for the feet, with the toes reaching the glass end. Inside the coffin are U.S. and Mexican currency.

The cloister area was built mostly in the 17th century, with the walls painted in murals from different eras, as well as a wood relief carving that represents piety. Next to this cloister is a second, larger open chapel with a presbytery and a transversal gallery. The complex's atrium is a large, park-like setting and is named the Atrium of the Olive Trees. This is due to the large gnarly trees that were planted here by Vasco de Quiroga, and supposedly have never borne fruit.

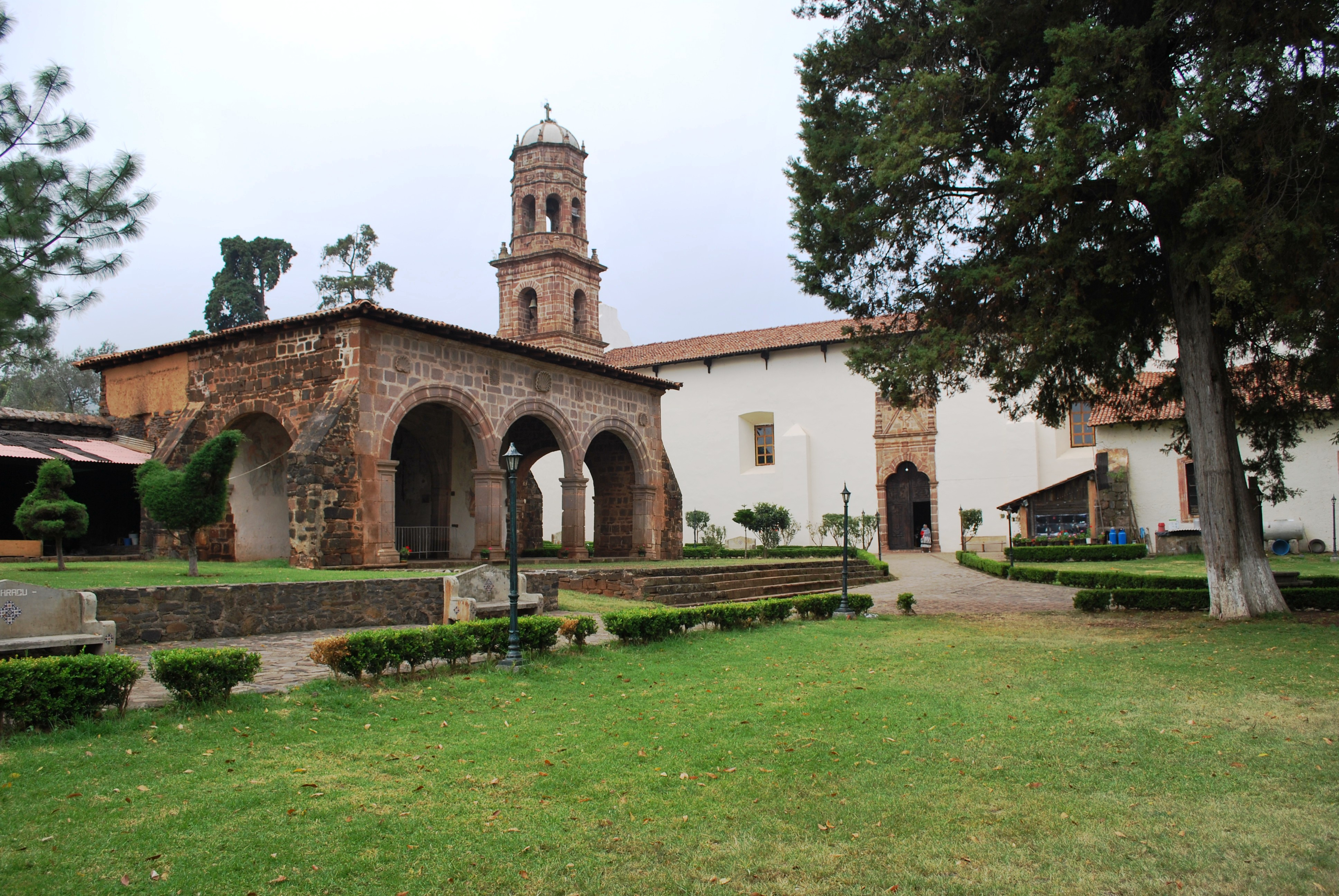
The other open chapel

In the 2000s, this complex underwent extensive renovation, which is being sponsored by the State Secretary of Tourism, INAH, and the Adopte una Obra de Arte (Adopt a Work of Art) project, which is a private organization that pairs donors with restoration projects. The town area around the ex-monastery has been declared a protected area by INAH to mandate orderly urban expansion and to protect the monastery complex. One of the regulations is that no buildings near the complex can be higher than the monastery's walls.

Part of the restoration project includes the founding of a workshop or school to teach young unemployed people the skills involved in restoration projects, with students working on the monastery project and others. The project also is in the process of founding a cultural center for the community to be located in the monastery complex once restoration work is completed. Enough of the restoration work has been completed so that events connected with the Festival Internacional de Música de Morelia and the Academia Mexicana de la Lengua have been held here. Courses to train tour guides for the municipality have also been offered, as well as classes in English and Purépecha and a photography exposition.

== Festivals ==
The major festival for this municipality is the Festival of the Señor del Rescate. From the 16th to the 19th century, the patron saint of Tzintzuntzan was Francis of Assisi. In the late 1800s, the town was severely affected by a measles epidemic. A sacristan found an old painting of Jesus hidden away in storage and asked for permission to make a vow to it. The vow was that if prayers to this image stopped the epidemic, the sacristan would sponsor a party in gratitude. The party indeed took place and has been repeated annually ever since. This is despite the loss of the original painting due to fire in 1944. The current painting on display is a copy, which believers say is taking on the burnished tones of the original. The festival is a movable feast and is celebrated during the time period of Carnival, just before Ash Wednesday. While Carnival is celebrated in this part of Michoacán, the festival of Señor del Rescate is more important, bringing indigenous peoples from all over Michoacán, as well as attracting pilgrims from other parts of Mexico and even from parts of the United States.

The Danza del Señor del Rescate represents a fight between good and evil. It features a number of characters including queens, angels and demons. Traditionally, girls wear beige, yellow or white dresses with a cape and crown, imitating the Christ painting. The devils represent evil, and the angels form a barrier the demons cannot pass. During the dance, the demons jump out at the crowds to try to scare them. During the fiesta, bells ring to scare evil spirits, and many pilgrims, some on their knees, enter the Church of San Francisco to give thanks, ask for a miracle or be blessed with a crown placed on their heads, which represents Christ's blessings and redemption.

Like the rest of Mexico, Day of the Dead commemorations are important here, and like the rest of the Lake Pátzcuaro area, the celebration is more often called Night of the Dead. In this municipality, homage to the dead in cemeteries begins the night of 1 November and continues to the morning of the 2nd with a candlelight vigil. These dates coincide with the pre-Hispanic harvest festival. Cultural festivities for this event include a parade with floats related to the Night of the Dead commemorations that take place along the edges of Lake Pátzcuaro, as well as handcrafts and cooking competitions, which features atole. The name of this celebration is the Semana Artístico-Cultural de Noche de Muertos (Artistic-Cultural Week of the Night of the Dead).

Although the Purépecha new year is celebrated at the beginning of February, at the end of December Tzintzuntzan holds the Festival Cultural de Fin de Año (Cultural Festival of the End of the Year) at the adjacent archeological site. The event is sponsored by the municipality, the state secretary of tourism and other organizations. The event hosts traditional dancers and "pireris" (a type of traditional Purépecha singer). The goal of the festival is to allow Purépecha groups from around Lake Pátzcuaro a chance to demonstrate their culture. Some of the featured dances include the "Danza de los Tumbies", "Danza de los Moros" and the "Pescador Navegante". In the evening, the Purépecha ball game (uáruhua) with the ball on fire also takes place.
