= Irecha (title) =

Ruler of the Purépecha Empire

Irecha of Purépecha Empire

Details
- First monarch: Tarhiakurhi
- Last monarch: Tanhaxwani II
- Formed: c. 1350s
- Abolished: 1530
- Residences: P'atskwarhu (c. 1350s-c. 1420s) Jiwatsï (c. 1420s-c. 1435) Ts'intsuntsani (c. 1435 onwards)
- Appointer: Council of Nobles

Irecha was the title held by the ruler of the Purépecha Empire, which existed from the 14th to 16th centuries in the area of the modern states of Michoacán, Guerrero, Jalisco, Guanajuato, and the State of Mexico, briefly holding areas of Colima at its zenith. The Purepecha rulers have also been referred to by the term cazonci, a hispanized form of the Nahuatl caltzontzin.

== The Wakusïcha ==
Pawakume, T'ikatame, and Karapu are recognized irechecha in a few sources, though their reigns all precede the formation of the Irechikwa by about three centuries. Whether they held the title or if this is a posthumous edition by indigenous authors remains unknown, as they are credited as ancestral forebears of the empire.

Later members of the Wakusïcha line are not called irecha until Tarhiakurhi.

Iréchaecha
- of the Iréchikwa
- Tariácuri (c. 1350–c. 1390)
- Hiquingaje (c. 1390–c. 1420?)
- Hiripan (c. 1420?–c. 1435)
- Tangáxuan I (1435–1454)
- Tzitzipandáquare (1454–1479)
- Zuangua (1479–1520)
- Tangáxuan II (1520–1530)
Colonial rulers
- of Michoacan
Corregidor
- Pedro de Arellano (1530–1543)
Governors
- Francisco Taríacuri (1543–1545)
- Antonio Huitziméngari (1545–1562)
