= Purépecha Empire =

State in central Mexico (c. 1300–1530)

Purépecha Kingdom Ts'intsúntsani Iréchikwa
- c. 1300–1530
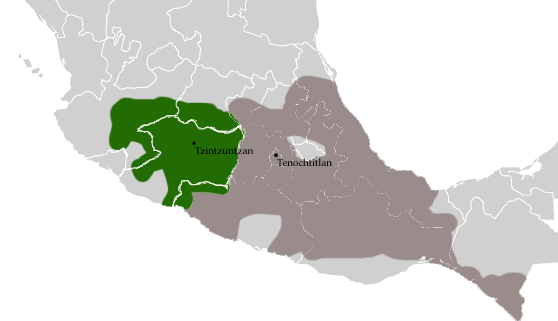
- Extent of the Purépecha Empire is shown in green, next to that of the Aztec Empire shown in dark gray.
- Capital: Tzintzuntzan
- Common languages: Purépecha (primary) Matlatzinca, Nahuatl (minority)
- Religion: Polytheism
- Government: Monarchy
- Irecha
  - 1300–1350: Tariácuri (founder)
  - 1520–1530: Tangáxuan II (last)
- History
  - Established: c. 1300
  - Conquered by New Spain: 1530

Area
- 1450: 75,000 km^{2} (29,000 sq mi)

Population
  - 1519: 1,500,000
Succeeded by
New Spain
- Today part of: Mexico

The Purépecha Empire, also known as the Kingdom of Tzintzuntzan (Purépecha: Ts'intsúntsani Iréchikwa, [tsʰin'd͡zund͡zani̥ i'ɾet͡ʃikʷa]), was a polity in pre-Columbian Mexico. Its territory roughly covered the geographic area of the present-day Mexican state of Michoacán, as well as eastern Jalisco, southern Guanajuato, and western Guerrero. At the time of the Spanish conquest, it was the second-largest state in Mesoamerica. The state is also colloquially known as the Tarascan Empire.

The kingdom was founded in the early 14th century and lost its independence to the Spanish in 1530. In 1543 it officially became the governorship of Michoacán. The Nahuas of the Aztec Empire called this region Michhuahcān from mich ("fish"), -huah ("owner / possessor of"), and -cān ("place of") which means "place of fisher folk".

The Purépecha Kingdom was constituted of a network of tributary systems and gradually became increasingly centralized. This was by leadership of the Irecha (plural iréchicha), meaning "king" in the Purépecha language, or even queen, Kuhcha (plural kuhcháecha). The Spaniards knew the king as Cazonci, from Nahuatl caltzontzin. The Purépecha capital was located at Tzintzuntzan (Ts'intsúntsani, "place of hummingbirds") on the shore of Lake Pátzcuaro. According to the Relación de Michoacán, it was founded by the first king Tariácuri, dominated by his lineage, the Vacúxecha (Wakúsïcha, [wa'kuʃɨt͡ʃa], "eagles").

The Purépecha Kingdom was a contemporary and rival of the Aztec Empire, against which it fought many wars. The Purépecha Kingdom blocked Aztec expansion to the west, fortifying and patrolling their frontiers with the Aztecs, possibly developing the first truly territorial state of Mesoamerica.

Due to its relative isolation within Mesoamerica, the Purépecha Kingdom had many cultural traits completely distinct from those of the Mesoamerican cultural group. It is particularly noteworthy for being among the few Mesoamerican civilizations to use metal for tools, and even weapons.

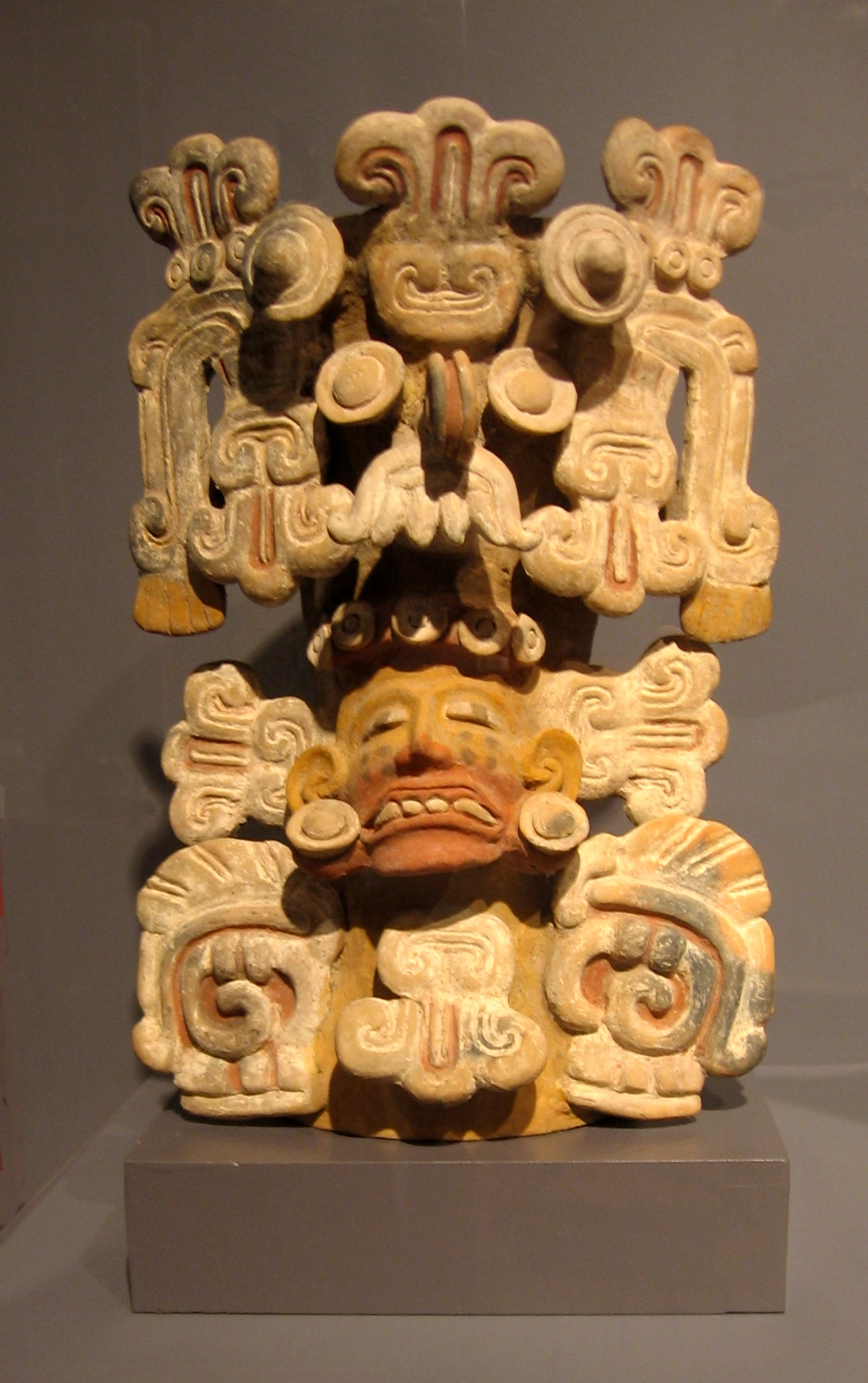
A Purépecha incense burner showing a deity with a "Tlaloc headdress", 1350–1521 CE.

== Etymology and definitions ==
The term "Purépecha" comes from the word P'urhépicha (pronunciation: [pʰuˈɽepit͡ʃa]), the latter used since the pre-Hispanic era to mean "villager/commonfolk". The root p'urhé- means "to stroll", the stem -pi indicates homes/fields/markets, and the plural suffix -cha, refers to them in a more literal sense as "those who stroll about the land".

In the Relación de Cuiseo de la Laguna it states, "And this name was given to them because their king ordinarily took them cargoed to wars, and found them to be stronger, both for this and for their crops".

The Nahuas knew a Purépecha as Michua, meaning "owner of fish", whilst the Matlatzinca knew one as hue Ninche, meaning "the eagle" or hue Hohuí, "the warrior". The Mazahua knew the Purépecha homeland as Animaxe, meaning "place of eagles", while the Otomi knew its inhabitants as Amanthâhi or Amandâhŷ, meaning "wind people". The Mixtec term for the Purépecha and their country was Ñuu Teyaca ('place/people of fish').

Another word by which the Purépecha people have been called is Tarasco, from the Purépecha word "tarhaskwa", meaning "parent-in-law/child-in-law". It's said to have been made by the Spaniards because the natives, out of fear of this newcoming force, would call them "tarhaskwa", suggesting an arranged marriage to avoid harm. The term is unpopular in most Purépecha communities but still heard in others.

== Ethnic groups ==
The kingdom included different groups, primarily Purépecha people and additionally Nahuas in several areas, Otomi, Matlazincas and Mazahuas along the eastern borders and in Charo and Huetamo, Chichimecs such as Guamares and Pames in the Bajio, Cocas around Lake Chapala, Cuitlatecs around the Balsas River valley, and Chumbios around Zacatula.

== Geography and lithic occupation ==
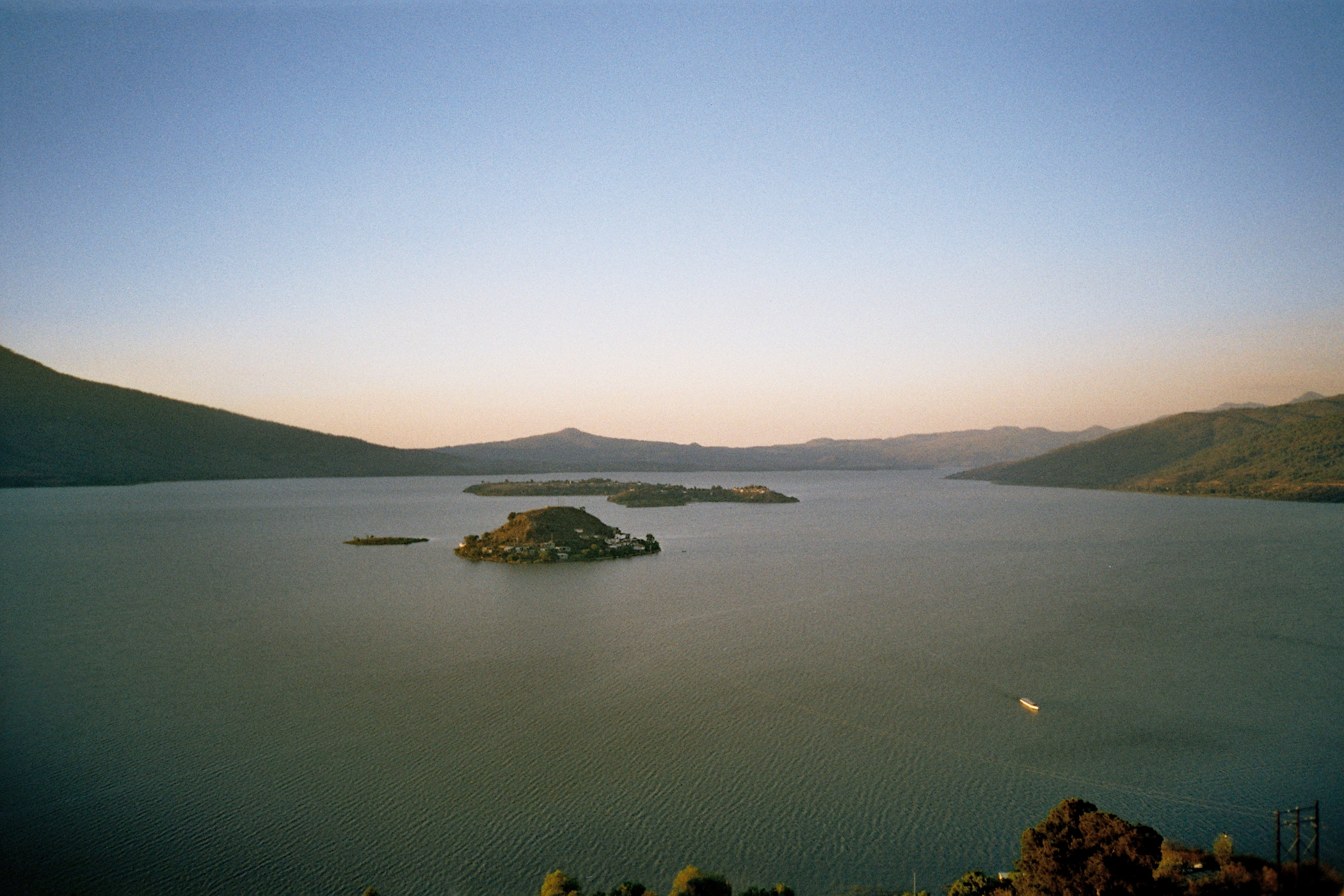
Islands in Lake Pátzcuaro, viewed from the top of Janitzio island.

The setting of what would eventually form the Purépecha Kingdom are the highlands of the Trans-Mexican Volcanic Belt and the lowlands of the Tierra Caliente, both between the Lerma and Balsas rivers. The northern highlands are temperate, whilst the south feels tropical and arid. It is dominated by Cenozoic volcanic mountains and lake basins above 2000 meters (6500 feet) altitude but also includes lower land in the southwestern coastal regions. Most common soil types in the central plateau are young volcanic andosols, luvisols and less fertile acrisols. The vegetation is mainly pine, pine-oak and fir. Human occupation has focused on the lake basins, which are abundant in resources. In the north, near the Lerma River, there are obsidian resources and thermal springs. The kingdom was centered around the Lake Pátzcuaro basin.

== History of the Iréchikwa ==
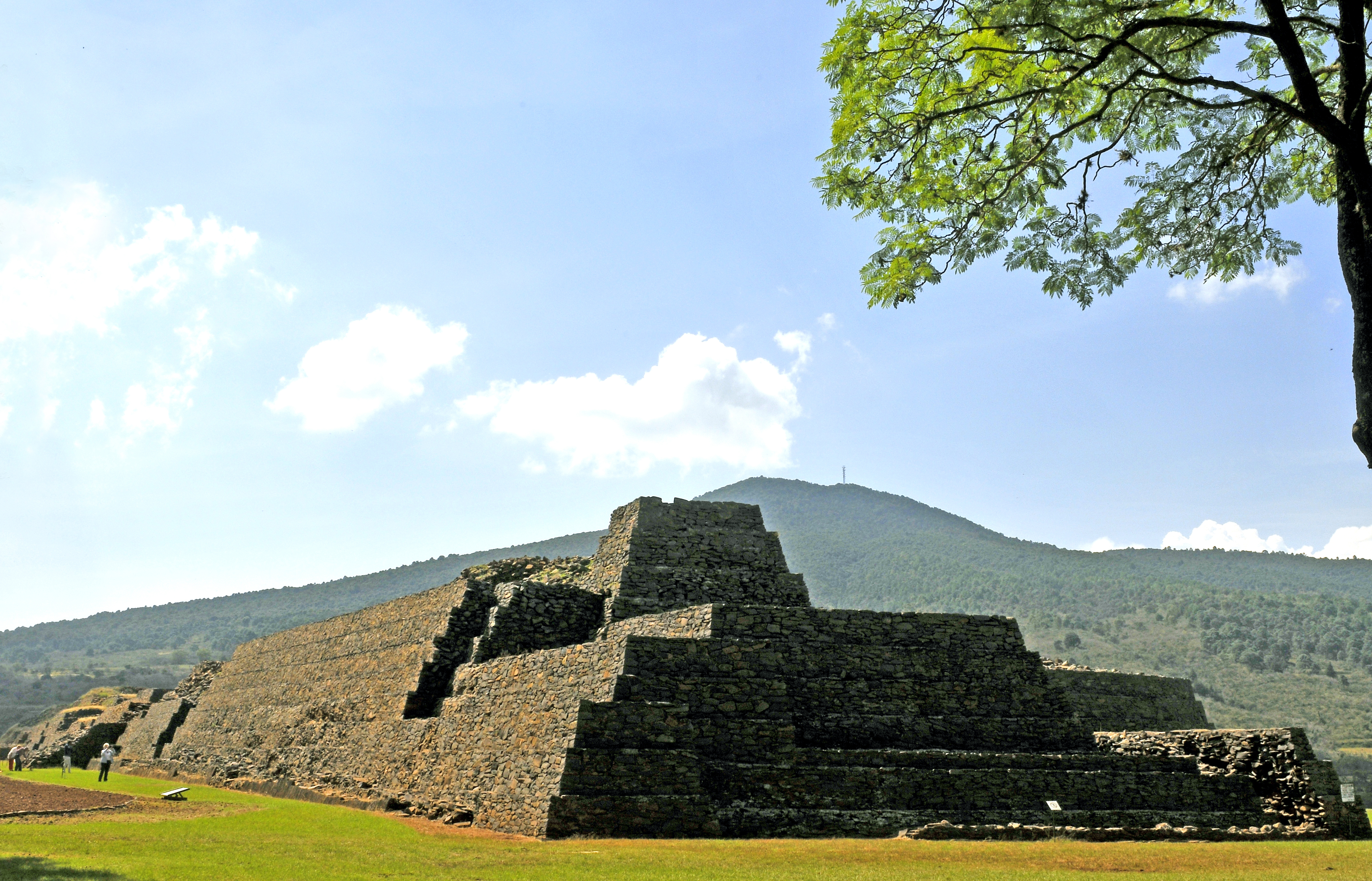
The archaeological site of Tzintzuntzan, capital of the Iréchikwa

=== Early archaeological evidence ===
The Purépecha area has been inhabited at least since the early Pre-classic period. Early lithic evidence from before 2500 BC, like fluted points and stone utensils are found at some megafauna kill sites. The earliest radio-carbon dates of archeological sites fall around 1200 BC. The best known early Pre-classic culture of Michoacán was the Chupícuaro culture. Most Chupícuaro sites are found on lake islands which can be seen as a sign of it having traits relating it to the later Purépecha cultural patterns. In the early Classic period, ballcourts and other artifacts demonstrate a Teotihuacan influence in the Michoacán region.

=== Ethnohistorical sources ===
The most useful ethnohistorical source has been the Relación de Michoacán, written around 1540 by the Franciscan priest Fray Jeronimo de Acalá, containing translated and transcribed narratives from Purépecha noblemen. This Relación contains parts of the "official Tarascan history" as carried down through oral tradition: one part focuses on Purépecha state religion, the second on Purépecha society, and the last on Purépecha history and the Spanish conquest. Unfortunately the first part is only partly preserved. Other sources include a number of small pictorial manuscripts, the best known being the Lienzo de Jucutacuto.

== Foundation and expansion ==
Iréchaecha
- of the Iréchikwa
- Tariácuri (c. 1350–c. 1390)
- Hiquingaje (c. 1390–c. 1420?)
- Hiripan (c. 1420?–c. 1435)
- Tangáxuan I (1435–1454)
- Tzitzipandáquare (1454–1479)
- Zuangua (1479–1520)
- Tangáxuan II (1520–1530)
Colonial rulers
- of Michoacan
Corregidor
- Pedro de Arellano (1530–1543)
Governors
- Francisco Taríacuri (1543–1545)
- Antonio Huitziméngari (1545–1562)

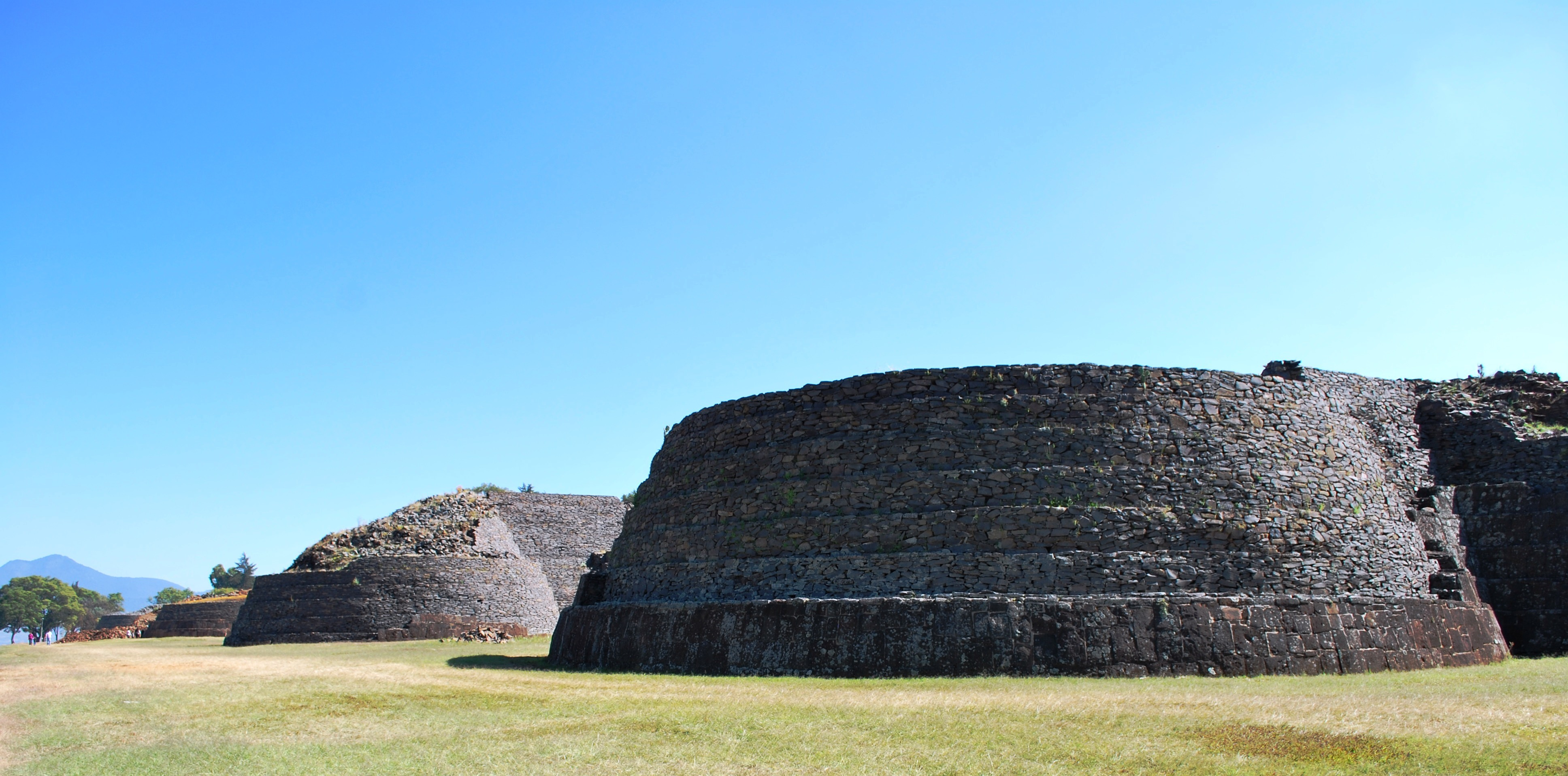
Fourth yacata pyramid on the south end of the line in Tzintzuntzan.

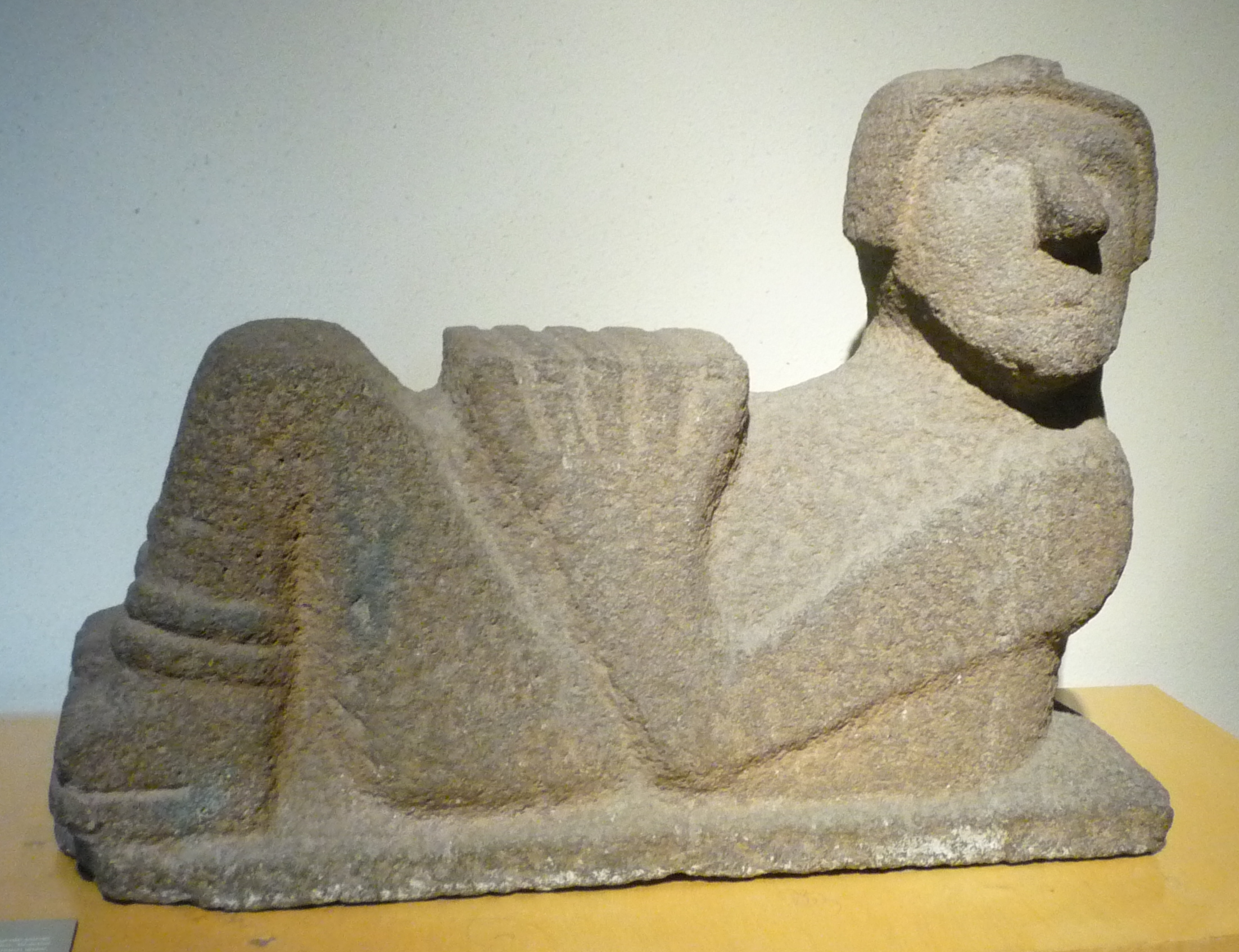
Chacmool. Cultures of the West Chamber. National Museum of Anthropology (Mexico)

In the late classic, at least two non-Purépecha ethnic groups lived around Lake Pátzcuaro: Nahuatl speakers in Jarácuaro, and some Chichimecan cultures on the northern banks, with the Nahua population being the second largest.

According to the Relación de Michoacán a visionary leader of the Purépecha named Tariácuri decided to gather the communities around Lake Pátzcuaro into one strong state. Around 1300 he undertook the first conquests and installed his sons Hiripan and Tangáxuan as lords of Ihuatzio and Tzintzuntzan respectively, himself ruling from Pátzcuari city. By the death of Taríacuri (around 1350), his lineage was in control of all the major centers around Lake Pátzcuaro. His son Hiripan continued the expansion into the area surrounding Lake Cuitzeo.

Hiripan and later his brother Tangáxuan I began to institutionalize the tributary system and consolidate the political unity of the kingdom. They created an administrative bureaucracy and divided responsibilities of and tributes from the conquered territories between lords and nobles. In the following years, first the sierra and then the Balsas River was incorporated into the increasingly centralized state.

Under the rule of King Tzitzipandáquare a number of regions were conquered, only to be lost again by rebellions or strategic retreats when confronted with Aztec expansion. In 1460 the Iréchikwa reached the Pacific coast at Zacatula, advanced into the Toluca Valley, and also, on the northern rim, reached into the present day state of Guanajuato. In the 1470s, Aztecs under Axayacatl captured a series of frontier towns and closed in on the Purépecha heartland, but were eventually defeated. This experience prompted the Purépecha ruler to further fortify the Aztec frontier with military centers along the border, such as at Cutzamala. He also allowed Otomies and Matlatzincas who had been driven out of their homelands by the Aztecs to settle in the border area under the condition that they took part in the defense of the Purépecha lands. From 1480 the Aztec ruler Ahuitzotl intensified the conflict with the Iréchikwa. He supported attacks on Purépecha lands by other ethnic groups allied with or subjugated to the Aztecs such as Matlatzincas, Chontales, and Cuitlatecs. The Purépecha, led by King Zuangua, repelled the attacks but further Purépecha expansion was halted until the arrival of the Spaniards two years into the rule of the last king of a sovereign kingdom, Tangáxuan II.

Between 1480 and 1510, the Iréchikwa occupied parts of present day Colima and Jalisco in order to secure Nitratine (Chile saltpeter) mines in the region. Throughout the occupation, the peoples of Colima, Sayula, Zapotlán, Tapalpa, and Autlán resisted Purépecha rule in the Saltpeter War. By the end of the 30 year long occupation, the Iréchikwa was forced out of the area permanently.

== Religion ==
Like most Mesoamerican cultures, the Purépecha were polytheists who worshipped a large array of deities called Tukúpacha. This term also had abstract aspects of supernatural energy and similarly called the seas tukúpacha hapunda, like their eastern Aztec neighbors teoatl.

- Kweráwahpiri, goddess of rain and mother of the gods. Her name meaning "creator", she's said to have been highly esteemed by the entire kingdom which fed her with blood. She's in charge of sending clouds and rainfall via the steam of thermal springs at Araro and Zinapecuaro.
- Xarhátanha, goddess of maize and sustenance. Her name meaning "shown one", she's described wearing a crown of chilies, necklaces of beans, bracelets of maize, and is said to bring crops to the earth. In a tale, she's responsible for concealing the fish of Lake Pátzcuaro.
- Kurhiti K'éri, creator of humans and messenger of the gods. His name meaning grand stoker, stokers referring to priests, he's said to have made humanity four times over, using eight balls of ash mixed with the blood of his ears, creating four men and four women to populate the world.
- Parhákwahpini, the earth. The land (echérindo) is said to be on this goddess' back, her head facing west (tsakápancha), left hand lying south (t'arhepu), right hand lying north (yawakwa), and legs lying east (terúhchukwa), making up the four parts of the world (t'ámbinharani).

== Metallurgy ==
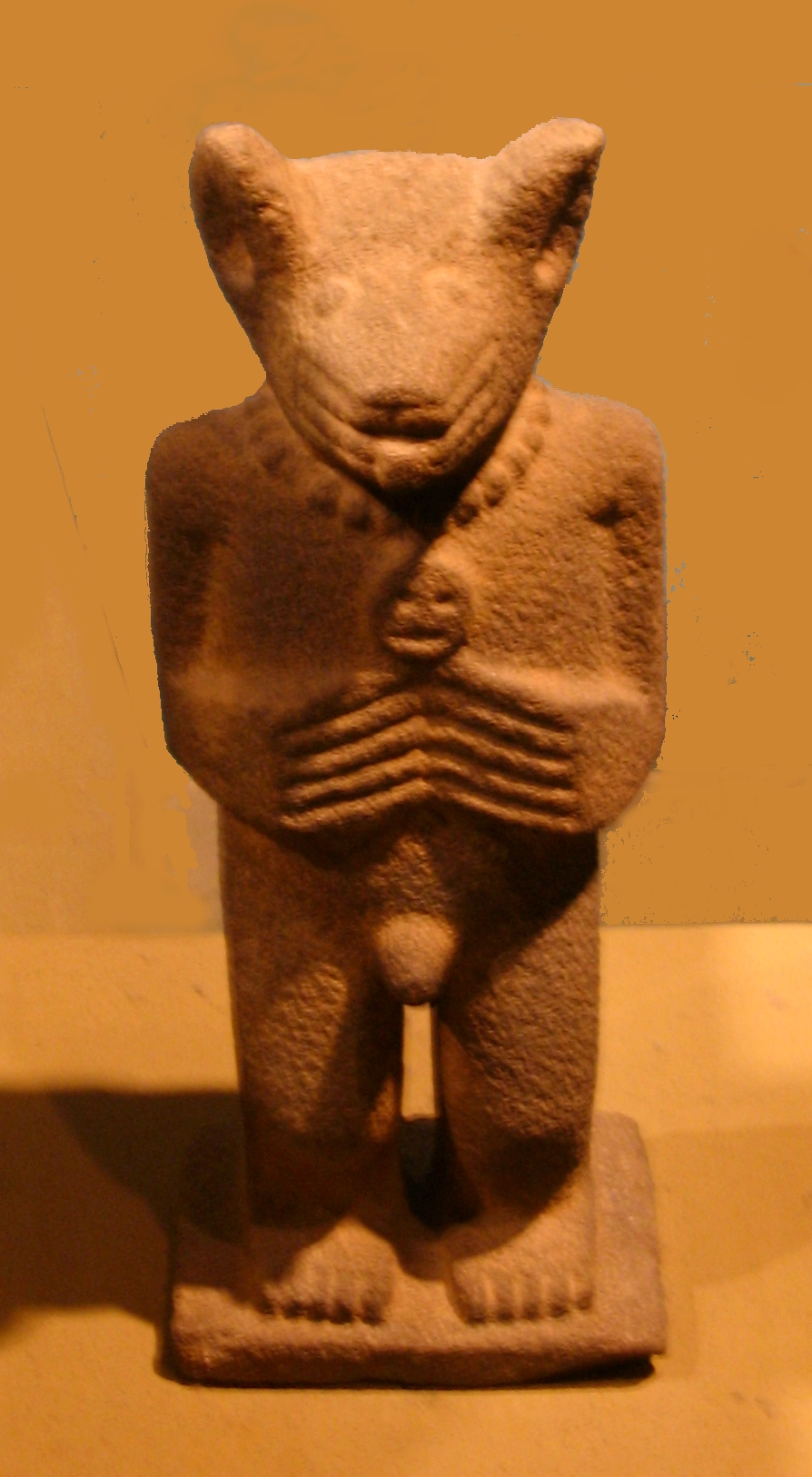
Pre-Columbian coyote statuette attributed to the Purépecha culture, likely a representation of the coyote god Uitzimángari. Height: 43.5 cm (17 in).

Historian Robert West states, "The Tarascans and their neighbors near the Pacific coast were the foremost metallurgists of pre-Conquest Mexico." This included copper, silver and gold, where Michoacán and Colima provided placer gold, Tamazula provided silver, and the La Huacana area provided copper. Copper-silver alloy artefacts found in the palaces and graves of Tzintzuntzan include rodelas, armlets, bracelets and cups. Copper bells made from lost-wax casting were used in religious ceremonies from 650 AD to at least 1200. This was followed by copper-gold and copper-silver items such as discs, bracelets, diadems and masks. Other items were made from bronze, including needles, fishhooks, tweezers, axeheads, and awls. The religious national treasures were looted by the Spanish during the Conquest from Lake Pátzcuaro graves and storerooms.

It has been speculated that Purépecha metallurgy was developed due to contact with South American cultures.

== Spanish conquest of Purépecha Kingdom ==
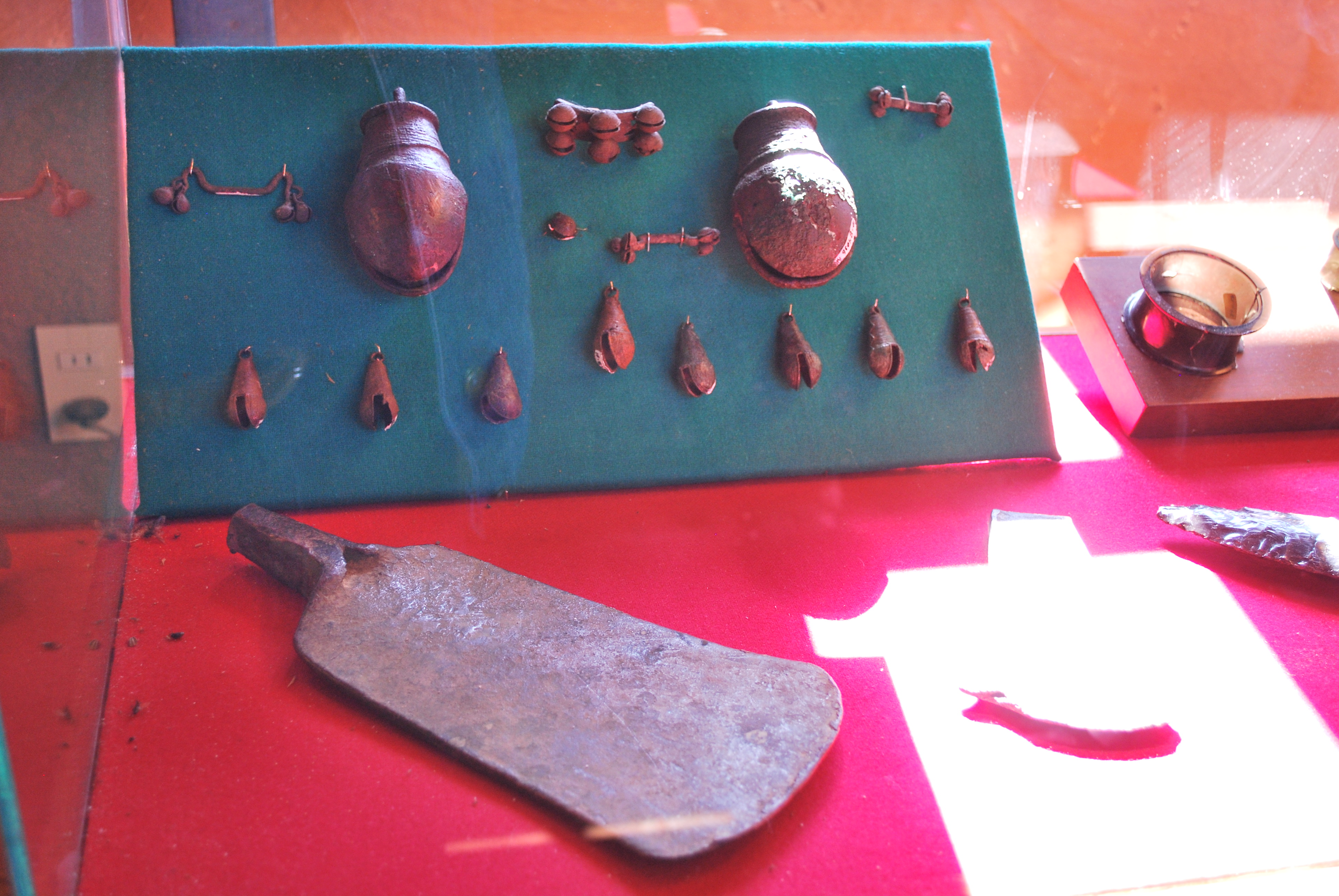
Bronze tools and bells on display at the site museum of Tzintzuntzan.

After hearing about the fall of the Aztec Empire, King Tangáxuan II sent emissaries to the Spanish victors. A few Spaniards went with them to Tzintzuntzan where they were presented to the ruler and gifts were exchanged. They returned with samples of gold and Cortés' interest in the Iréchikwa was awakened. In 1522 a Spanish force under the leadership of Cristóbal de Olid was sent into Purépecha territory and arrived at Tzintzuntzan within days. The Purépecha army numbered many thousands, perhaps as many as 100,000, but at the crucial moment they chose not to fight. Tangáxuan submitted to the Spanish administration, but for his cooperation was allowed a large degree of autonomy. This resulted in a strange arrangement where both Cortés and Tangáxuan considered themselves rulers of Michoacán for the following years: the population of the area paid tribute to them both. When the Spanish found out that Tangáxuan was still de facto ruler of his kingdom but only supplied the Spanish with a small part of the resources extracted from the population they sent the ruthless conquistador Nuño de Guzmán, who allied himself with a Purépecha noble Don Pedro Panza Cuinierángari, and the king was executed on February 14, 1530. A period of violence and turbulence began. During the next decades Purépecha puppet rulers were installed by the Spanish government, but when Nuño de Guzman had been disgraced and recalled to Spain, Bishop Vasco de Quiroga was sent to the area to clean up. He rapidly gained the respect and friendship of the natives who ceased hostilities towards the Spanish hegemony.

== See also ==
- Angamuco
- Purépecha people
- Tarascan Plateau
