= Tzintzuntzan (Mesoamerican site) =

Pre-Columbian Purépecha archaeological site in Mexico

Coordinates: 19°37′25″N 101°34′27″W

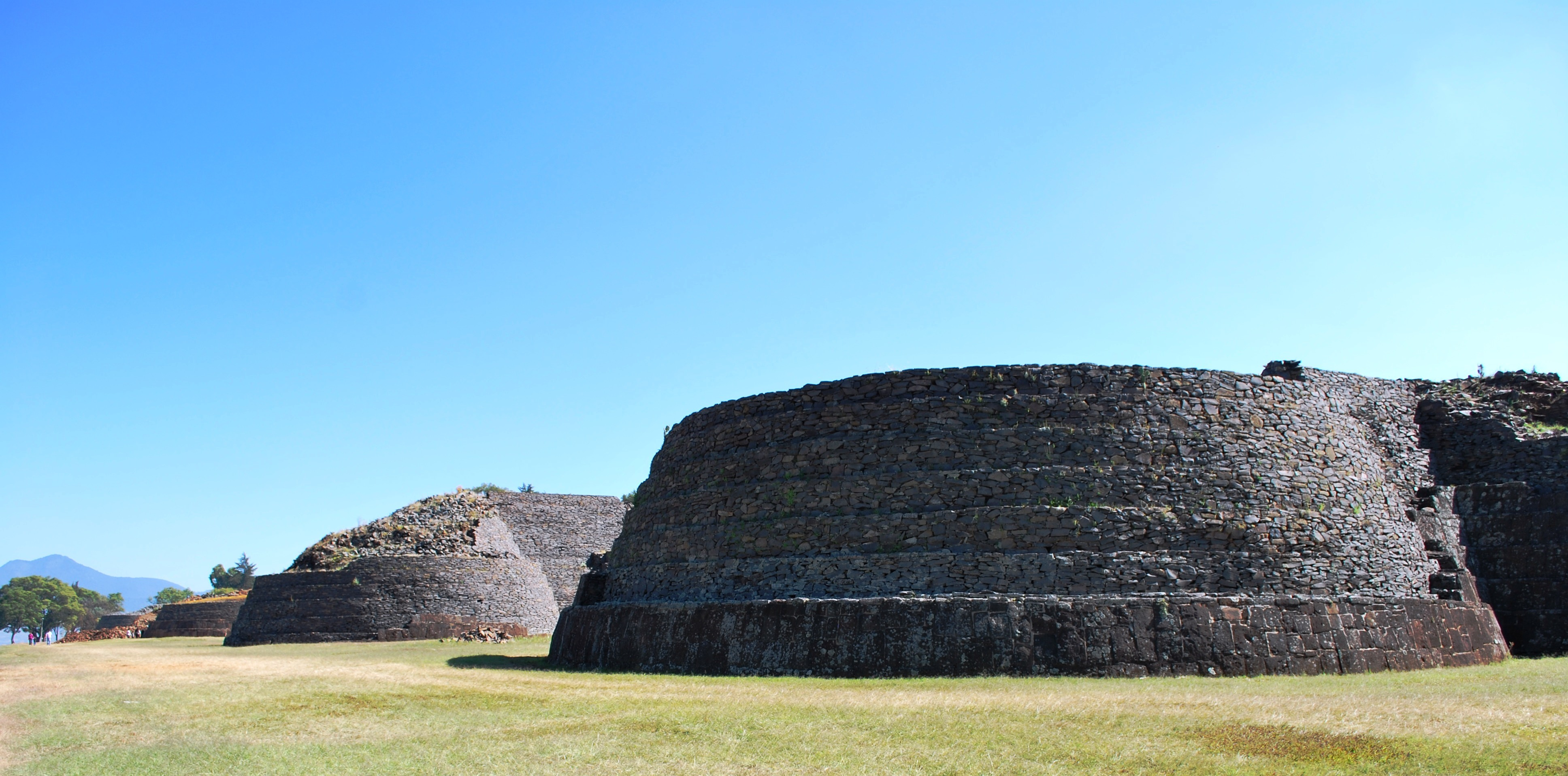
View of the yácata pyramids from the south end

Tzintzuntzan was the ceremonial center of the pre-Columbian Purépecha capital of the same name. The name comes from the Purépecha word Ts’intsuntsani, which means "place of hummingbirds." The site includes at least 1,000 archaeological features in an area that is at least 1,075 hectares.

After being in Pátzcuaro for the first years of the Purépecha Empire, power was consolidated in Tzintzuntzan in the mid 15th century. The empire continued to grow and hold off attacks by the neighboring Aztec Empire, until the Spanish arrived. Not wanting to suffer the destruction that the Aztec capital Tenochtitlan did, the emperor in this city surrendered to the Spanish. Eventually, much of the site and especially its distinct five rounded pyramids called yácatas were destroyed and the city almost completely abandoned.

Due to lack of interest in the old Purépecha dominion, excavation of this site did not begin until the 1930s. Its largest construction are the five yácata pyramids, which line up looking out over Lake Pátzcuaro. The other is the large Grand Platform excavated into the hillside on which the yácatas and other buildings rest. Today the site is still used for events such as the Festival Cultural de Fin de Año.

== Capital of the Purépecha Empire ==
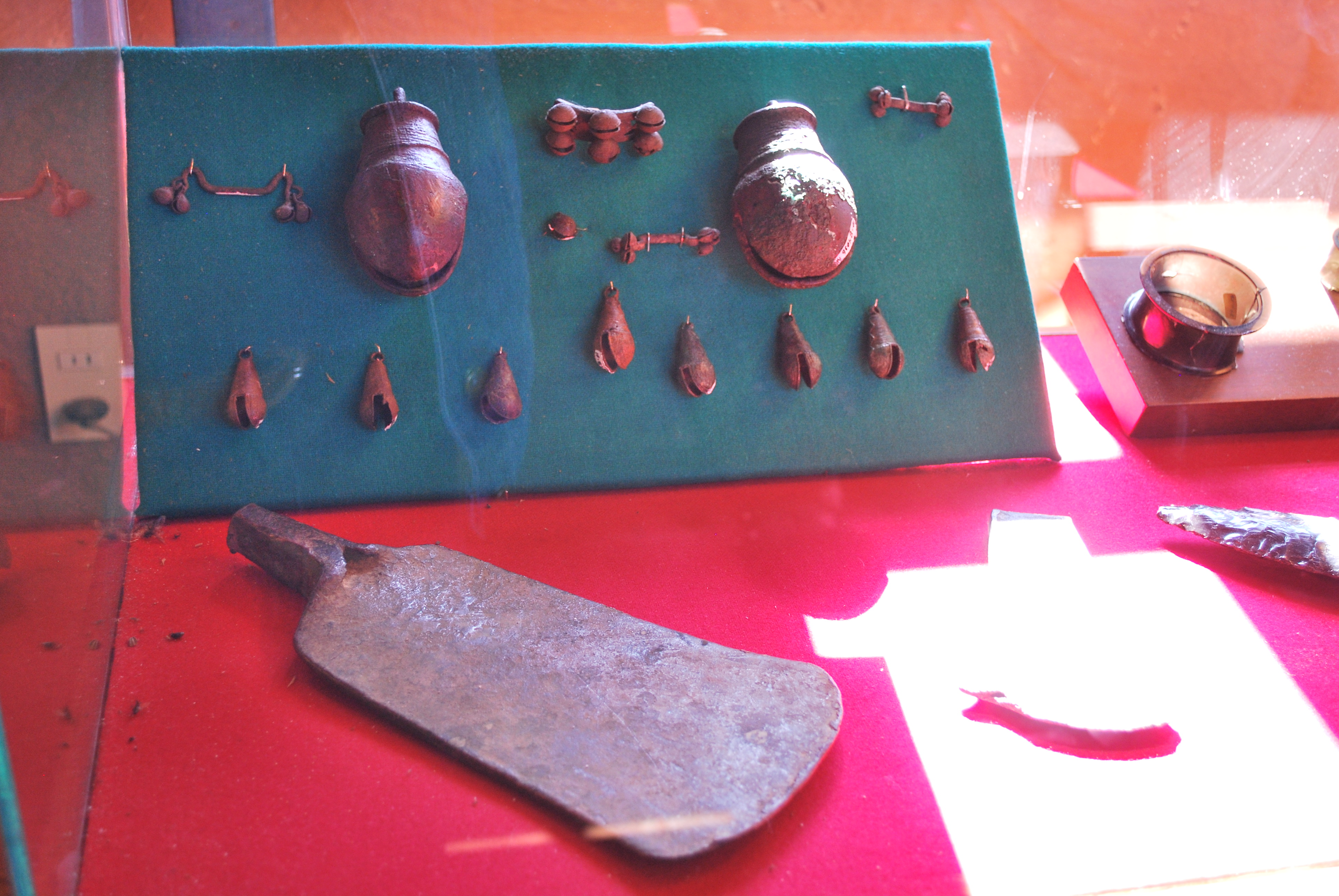
Purépecha copper and brass objects in the site museum

Tzintzuntzan was the capital of the Purépecha Empire when the Spanish arrived in 1522. As these people did not leave written records, what we know of this city and its empire come from Spanish writings and archeological evidence. The main Spanish document is called the Relación de las ceremonias y ritos población y gobierno de los indios de Michoacán, written by Jerónimo de Alcalá based on what he was told by the Purépecha elite in 1539. Other writings that refer to the capital include Hernán Cortés’ fourth letter in 1524, “La información de Don Vasco de Quiroga, sobre el asiento de su iglesia Catedral,” from 1538, “Tratado curioso y doctor de las cosas de la Nueva España” by Antonio de la Ciudad Real in 1590, “Relaciones goegráficas; las Crónica de la orden de Nuestro Seráfico Padre San Francisco, provincia de San Pedro y San Pablo de Mechoacan in la Nueva España” by Alonso de la Rea in the 17th century and the “Crónica de la provincia de los santos apóstoles San Pedro y San Pablo de Michoacán” by Pablo Beaumont.

For a number of reasons, the Purépecha origins are shrouded in mystery. Much of Purépecha culture is very distinct from other Mesoamerican cultures. The Purépecha language is unrelated to any other Mesoamerican language. Jeromimo de Acalá's collection of stories from Purépecha elders states that these people migrated to the Lake Pátzcuaro region, developing alliances among the people who were already here. Eventually, they became the dominant group and established their city at Tzintzuntzan. According to collected evidence, the Purépecha people may have begun to dominate the Pátzcuaro Lake area as early as 1000 CE, but definitely by 1250.

Purépecha traditional history states that around the year 1325 the king, warrior and hero Tarícuri declared himself lord and made Pátzcuaro his capital. His nephews were sent to rule neighboring Ihuatzio and Tzintzuntzan, and these two began to make military conquests from these points. During this time of expansion, the sphere of influence moved from Pátzcuaro to Tzintzuntzan, which had gained enough political dominance to bring the other cities under its control. During much of the empire's history, Tzintzuntzan had at least five times the population of any of the other cities, about 36 percent of the total Pátzcuaro Basin population. Around 1440, the empire was consolidated and an administrative bureaucracy founded at Tzintzuntzan. More expansion of the empire occurred between.

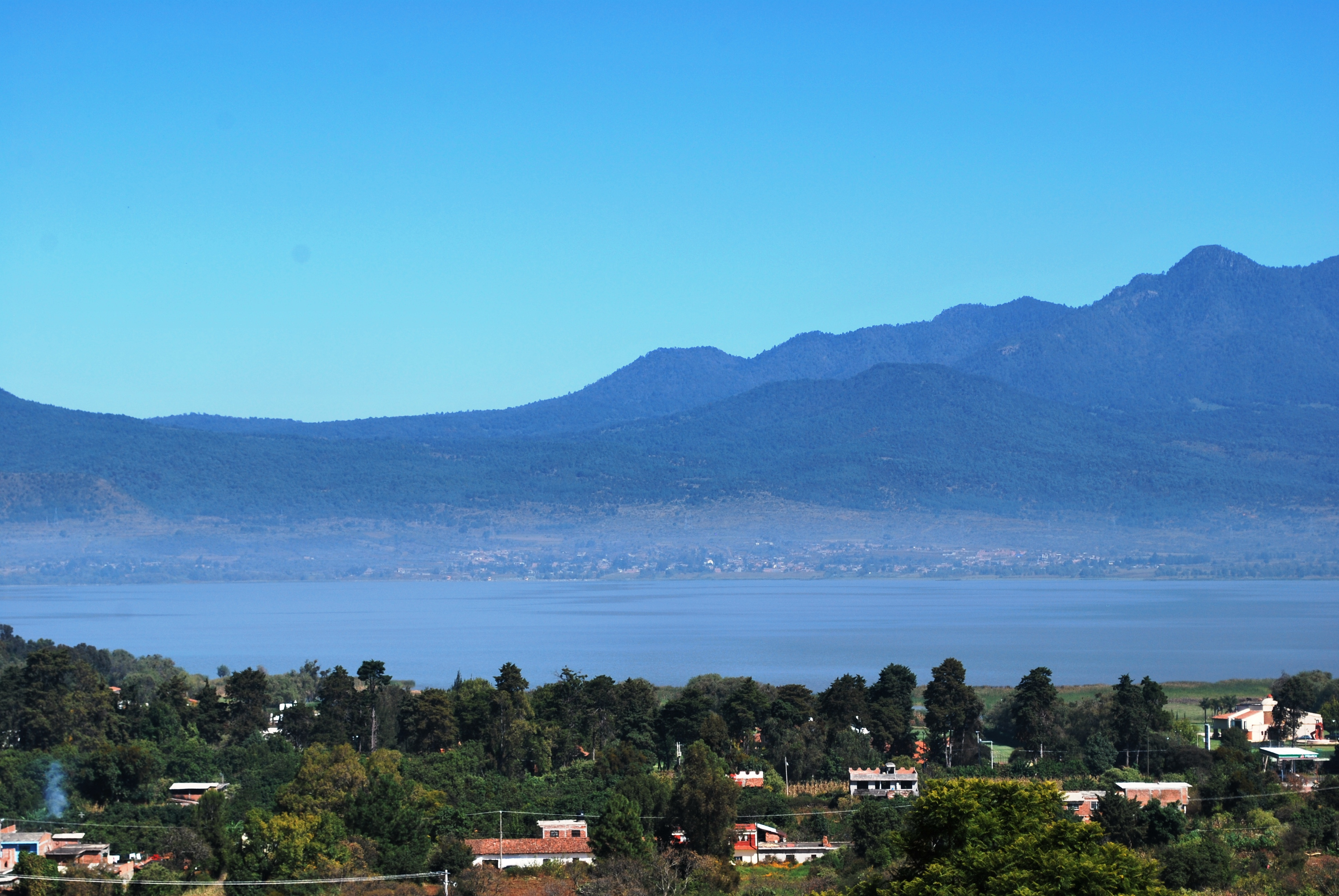
View of Lake Pátzcuaro from the site

The founding date of the city of Tzintzuntzan is most likely 1450, during the late post-classic period. The traditional history of the Empire for the 14th and 15th centuries is unclear because if it is to be believed, both Tarícuri and his nephews ruled for more than ninety years. Records are fairly clear that the consolidation of the empire began in the mid 15th century, producing a tributary state. The bureaucracy was centered in Tzintzuntzan and the empire expanded outside the Lake Pátzcuaro area from 1440 to 1500. This led to a very mixed ethnic composition for the empire, including the capital itself with only ten percent of the population of the lake area was ethnically Purépecha. About 25 to 35 percent of the population consisted of elites, their servants, and resident craft specialists. Political, economic and religious life was controlled from Tzintzuntzan. The site is located on the side of the Yauarato hill which permits a view of most of Lake Pátzcuaro and its shores. The hill protected this site from attack. The pre-Hispanic city of Tzintzuntzan extended from Lake Pátzcuaro to the hills just to the east and had a population of between 25,000 and 30,000 when the Spanish arrived in the 1520s. Purépecha power extended over a wide section of what is now central-west Mexico, encompassing what is now the state of Michoacán and parts of modern Guanajuato, Guerrero and Jalisco states. Despite being the capital of the second largest empire in Mesoamerica when the Spanish conquered Tenochtitlan, the city surrendered to the Spanish without a fight. There are two probable reasons for this. Even before the Spanish themselves arrived, epidemics of their diseases such as smallpox and measles had severely affected the Purépecha population, and likely killed the emperor. A new, young emperor was hastily installed, who had little political experience and hoped to work around Spanish rule, and avoid Tenochtitlán's fate of utter destruction. This hope ended when some Spanish administrators, acting without the authorization of the crown, burned him at the stake.

Tzintzuntzan was made the first capital of the new Spanish province of Michoacán in the 1520s, and Franciscan friars arrived here to evangelize the Purépecha people. Their monastery complex was built in part from stones taken five yácata pyramids of the ceremonial center. By the 1530s, the capital had been moved to Pátzcuaro and Tzintzuntzan's population plummeted until it was all but abandoned.

== Description of the site ==
The Tzintzuntzan archeological site is mostly what was the ceremonial center. It is situated on a large artificial platform excavated into Yahuarato hill overlooking Lake Pátzcuaro from the northeast shore. The ceremonial center contains a large plaza and several buildings known to house priests and nobility but the main attraction is the five yácatas or semi-circular pyramids that face out over the lake area. This ceremonial center was called Taríaran or “House of the Wind.” The archeological site was also a defensive fortification as well as a religious center.

In this ceremonial center, the king, or "cazonci," functioned as the representative of the main god Curicaueri. His principal duties were to conquer in the god's name and to ensure that the perpetual fires of the main temples were supplied with wood. Here a great number of human sacrifices were made, usually of prisoners of war. These sacrificed prisoners were believed to be messengers to the gods and were venerated as such. When a decision to go to war was made, huge bonfires were lit here, which would then be duplicated by priests at the eight other administrative centers of the empire. All 91 settlements in the Lake Pátzcuaro Basin could see these fires, and would know to prepare for war.

Tzintzuntzan has the largest of the Purépecha kingdom's monumental structures. The two most impressive structures here are the five yácata pyramids and the Grand Platform on which they rest. These are all visible and date from the site's second stage of occupation. The first stage is represented by smaller pyramid-type structures found underneath the yácatas. The Grand Platform is a large flat surface of 450m by 250m excavated into the side of the hill on which the yácata pyramids and other structures rest.

At the front of the platform, facing out towards Lake Pátzcuaro, are five yácata pyramids in a row roughly from north to south. Unlike Aztec or Mayan pyramids, these structures are rounded, not square. The five structures are roughly keyhole shaped, linked together at the back by stepped pyramidal platforms. The core of each of these structures is piled-up rubble which was then faced with stone slabs decorated with spirals, circles and other geometric designs and petroglyphs. These fitted stone slabs are similar to the masonry used by the Incas in South America. Another distinction of this and other Purépecha architecture is that no indication of stucco has ever been found.

On each of the yácatas was a temple made of wood, in which the most important rites of the Purépecha people and government took place, including burials, of which about sixty have been found. The burials that have been excavated contain rich grave goods and are probably of kings and high priests. Three of the yácatas remain unreconstructed.

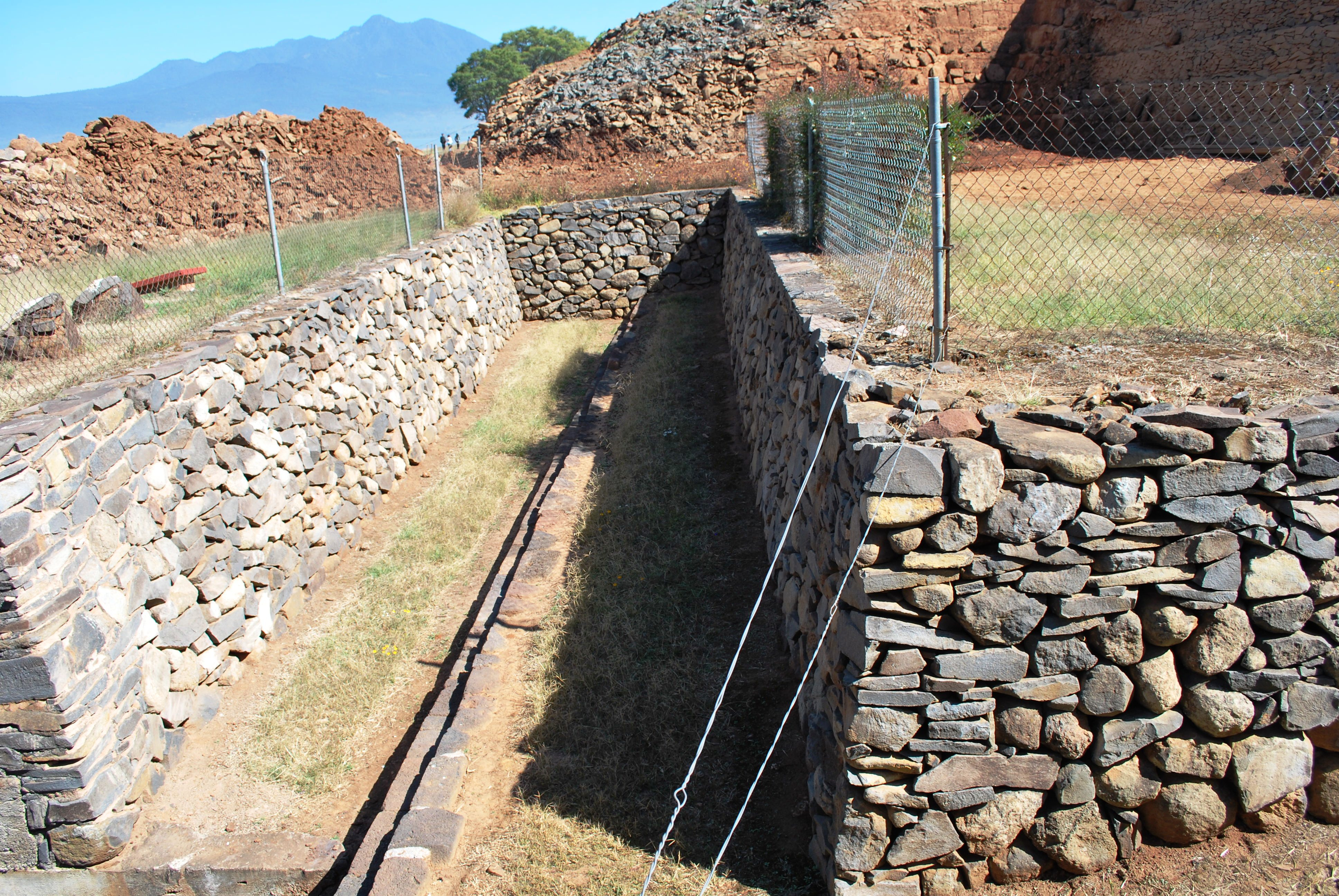
Excavations by yácatas revealing older structures

The yácatas were built over older, more traditional pyramidal structures from the first stage of the site's occupation. Between Yácatas 3 and 4, openings into the Grand Platform have been dug to reveal some of these structures, which include three sets of stairs and part of a circular wall. Behind the five yácatas is an enormous plaza with some smaller structures. On the platform, only the religious and political elite, their servants and their guards lived. Rituals such as those to the different gods, the sun and moon and events such as the equinoxes took place here. At the north end of the platform is El Palacio or Building B, which was explored in the 1940s and the 1980s, with several burials of monarchs and high priests. This was a royal palace or perhaps a residential area for elite priests. The palace had a room dedicated to storing the heads of enemies killed in battle. Building E is located in the middle of the small forest on the platform. It was used to store tribute items. Within this building is evidence of occupation during early colonial times.

Tzintzuntzan was organized by distinct neighborhoods of about 40 wards, each containing 25 households. Commoners, who made up the majority of the population, lived in small houses. They farmed and also produced consumer goods in residential workshops. Their marketplace most likely met daily and had local as well as imported goods, however its location has not been determined.

The Site Museum of the Archeological Zone of Tzintzuntzan was inaugurated in 1992, with the basic purpose of exhibiting items from the site. The museum contains one hall in which there are displays of religious, decorative and utilitarian items. There are graphics relating the history of the empire's governors as well as a map of modern Michoacán indicating the locations from which the displayed objects originated. The museum offers guided tours and the sale of publications and reproductions of artifacts.

== Excavation of the site ==
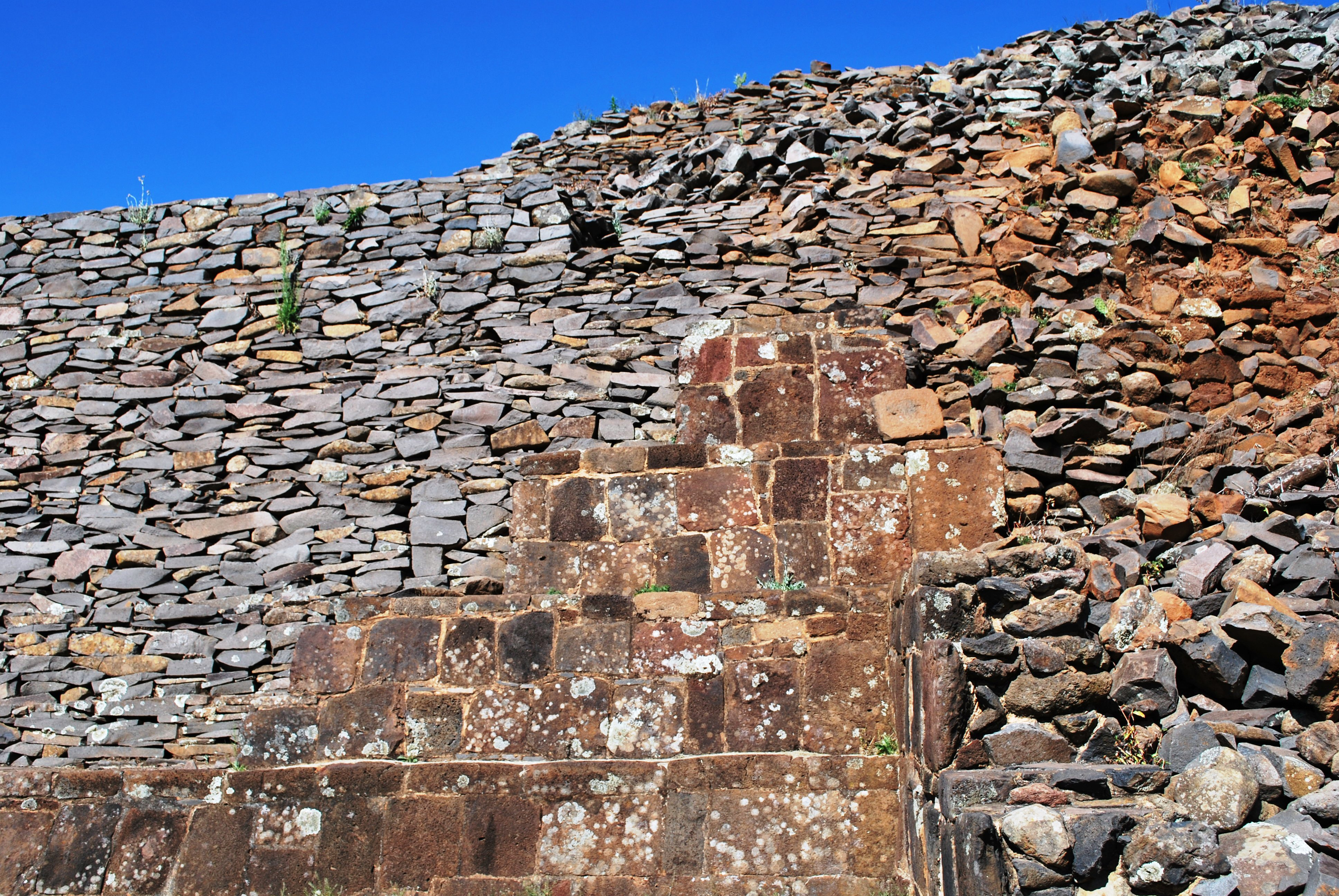
Part of one reconstructed yácata showing some of the stone facing.

In contrast to the Aztecs and the Maya, the ancient Purépechans left little monumental architecture. Towns were not fortified in any significant way, and roads had little if any paving. Only two ball courts are known in the area of the old empire and neither is in the capital. Until relatively recently, archeologists, anthropologists and historians had little interest in these people. There was even doubt that the Purépechans ever had a state society. However, recent investigations have revealed that the ancient Purépecha had a vast empire, second in territory only to the Aztecs and a complex culture that was in many ways unlike any other in Mesoamerica.

The first modern references to the yácatas of Tzintzuntzan date from the writings of Beaumont (1855), when Tzintzuntzan was first identified as the capital of the ancient Purépecha state. The first fieldwork here was that of Nicolas León in 1888. He outlined the basic characteristics of the buildings and gave a brief history of the site, emphasizing the events that led to the ancient city's destruction. However, no excavations took place at the site until the 1930s.

The area that is now open to the public is the first area to be excavated and reconstructed at the end of the 1930s. In 1930, Caso and Noguera began the first formal excavation in Tzintzuntzan. Their work proved difficult because of the composition of the soil, which made identifying the strata of the site and its chronology difficult.

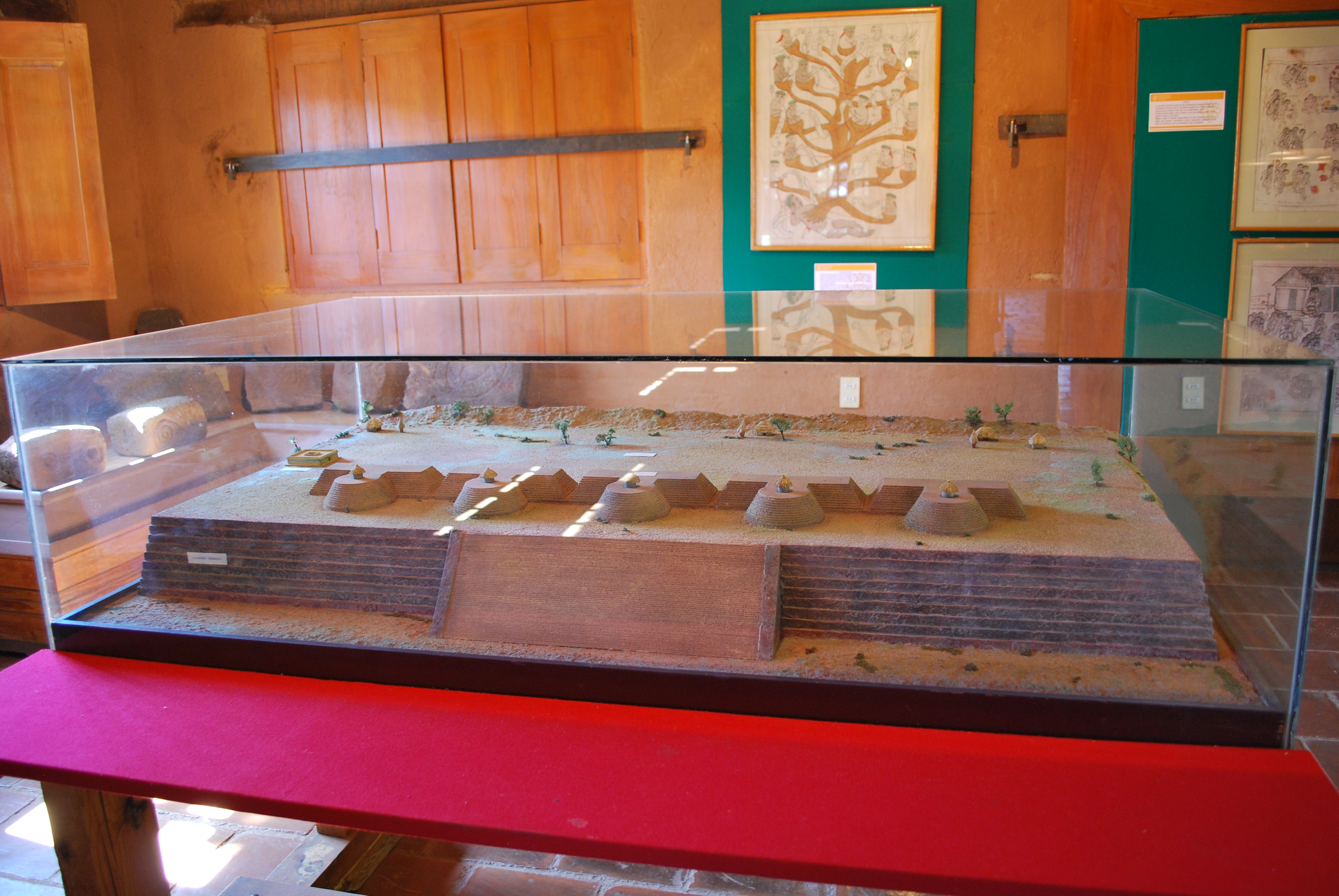
Model of the site in the site museum

In 1937, a series of eleven seasons of work at the site began to clean the site, consolidate it and reconstruct the main architectural elements. Other studies took place alongside this work. This work was headed by Alfonso Caso and focused on Yácata Number 5, as well as the consolidation of the north end of the line of yácatas. During the 1938 season, further consolidation was undertaken as well as the excavation of burials and the attempt to establish a chronology of occupation via layers. Yácata 5 was cleaned, as well as Building A (from colonial times) and Building B was discovered. From 1940 to 1946, Yácata 5 was finished, and Buildings B and C were excavated. Topographical and strata studies were undertaken in support of the study of ceramics here. Excavation of burials was completed, and the rectangular area between Yácatas 4 and 5 was investigated, as well as the rectangular area by Yácata 1. From 1962 to 1968, the area was explored by Dr. Piña Chan. The front of Yácata 1 and the wall delimiting the Grand Platform were reconstructed. A colonial-era building was discovered (Building D), an altar in Building B was discovered and Yácata 5 was excavated to determine how it was built. The neighborhood of Santa Ana, which is in front of the yácata pyramids was explored and more reconstructions of yácatas and walls was done. In the 1970s, a detailed map was made of the site, relying on both that archaeology that has so far been done and period records. The ceremonial plaza and the perimeter, as well as Yácatas 2 and 3, were the last to be studied. Building E, a storage facility was also found and explored. Outside the perimeter, an obsidian workshop with living quarters was found.

The last time the area was studied was in 1992 by Efraín Cárdenas. The northwest face of the Great Platform was restored and the site museum was built.

== The site today ==
The yácatas are considered one of the most emblematic sites of the area. The site hosts the annual Festival Cultural de Fin de Año in which the indigenous communities around Lake Pátzcuaro demonstrate their culture, mostly through song and dance. The annual event is sponsored by the local municipality, other lake communities as well as the state Secretary of Tourism. It takes place at the end of December between Christmas and New Year's Day. Some of the traditional dances that take place include the Danza del Pescado, Danza de los Moros, Danza de los Tumbies and Pescador Navegante. In the evening, there are Purépecha ball games (uárukua) in which the ball is set on fire and sticks similar to those used in hockey are employed. The actual Purépecha new year is the beginning of February.

=== Religion in the land ===
The most well-known church still standing in Tzintzuntzan is the Monastery of San Francisco; its two open chapels attract tourists interested in the country's religious history.
