= Gertrudis (film) =

- Directed by: Ernesto Medina
- Story by: Eduardo Casar; Ofelia Medina
- Starring: Ofelia Medina; Angélica Aragón; Fernando Balzaretti; Eduardo Palomo; Mónica Miguel; César Évora; Jorge Russek
- Cinematography: Tomomi Kamata
- Edited by: John Lilly
- Music by: Leonardo Velázquez
- Production company: Cinemedina
- Release date: 25 September 1992 (Mexico)
- Running time: 98 minutes
- Country: Mexico
- Language: Spanish

Gertrudis is a 1992 Mexican biographical film about the life and execution of Gertrudis Bocanegra, a noted female insurgent of the Mexican War of Independence. It stars Ofelia Medina in the title role and was directed by her brother, Ernesto Medina.

== Cast ==
- Ofelia Medina as Gertrudis Bocanegra
- Angélica Aragón as Pilar Molina
- Fernando Balzaretti as Miguel Alzate
- Mónica Miguel as Nana
- Eduardo Palomo as Esteban Díaz
- César Évora as Pedro Advíncula
- Jorge Russek as Sr. Bocanegra

== Production ==
The film was based on "the only two biographies written of this woman [Bocanegra]". Ofelia Medina, who co-wrote the screenplay with Eduardo Casar, stated: "The documents are minimal, with very few pages; we totally respected what they say, but it was necessary to create an element of romance around Gertrudis, since nothing is known of her personal relationships".

Mónica Miguel was cast as Bocanegra's unnamed Purépecha nanny (called "nana" in the film) who teaches Bocanegra the Purépecha language. In an interview, the actress commented on her character's overall importance: "And it is a very deep character, because it represents all the Purépecha race, with all its history, and hopefully more movies related to our culture, traditions and history will be made".

The film was shot on location at Pátzcuaro, Erongarícuaro, Tzintzuntzan, and Zirahuén.

== Accolades ==
In 1993, Gertrudis won the Ariel Award for Best Costume Design (Mara González and Xóchitl Vivo). It was also nominated for Best Supporting Actress (Angélica Aragón), Best Music Theme (Leonardo Velázquez), and Best First Work (Ernesto Medina).
