= Purépecha (disambiguation) =

The Purépecha are an indigenous people of the Mexican state of Michoacán.

Purépecha may also refer to:

- Purépecha language, the language of the Purépecha
- Purépecha religion, the traditional religion of the Purépecha
- Purépecha Empire, or the Tarascan state, an indigenous civilization in Mexico centered on the Purépecha
