= Erendira =

Erendira may refer to:

- Princess Erendira who led the Purépecha uprising against the Spanish
- The Incredible and Sad Tale of Innocent Eréndira and Her Heartless Grandmother, a novella by Gabriel García Márquez
  - Eréndira (film), 1983 film based on the above
- Eréndira (film), 2006 film based on Princess Erendira
- Eréndira (album), by British jazz quartet First House
- Ejido Eréndira, small community in Baja California, Mexico
- Erendira (spider), genus of spider family Corinnidae
