= Purépecha flag =

Flag of the Purépecha people

Purépecha
- Proportion: 10:19
- Adopted: 17 November 1980
- Designed by: José Luis Soto González

The Purépecha flag is the official flag of the Purépecha people, an Indigenous nation in Michoacán, Mexico. This flag consists of four fields of four colors with a shield and the words Juchari Uinapekua (Our Strength) below the shield. This flag is unique in its kind and emerged in the town of Santa Fe de la Laguna in 1980. It is a polity flag of Mexico.

== History ==
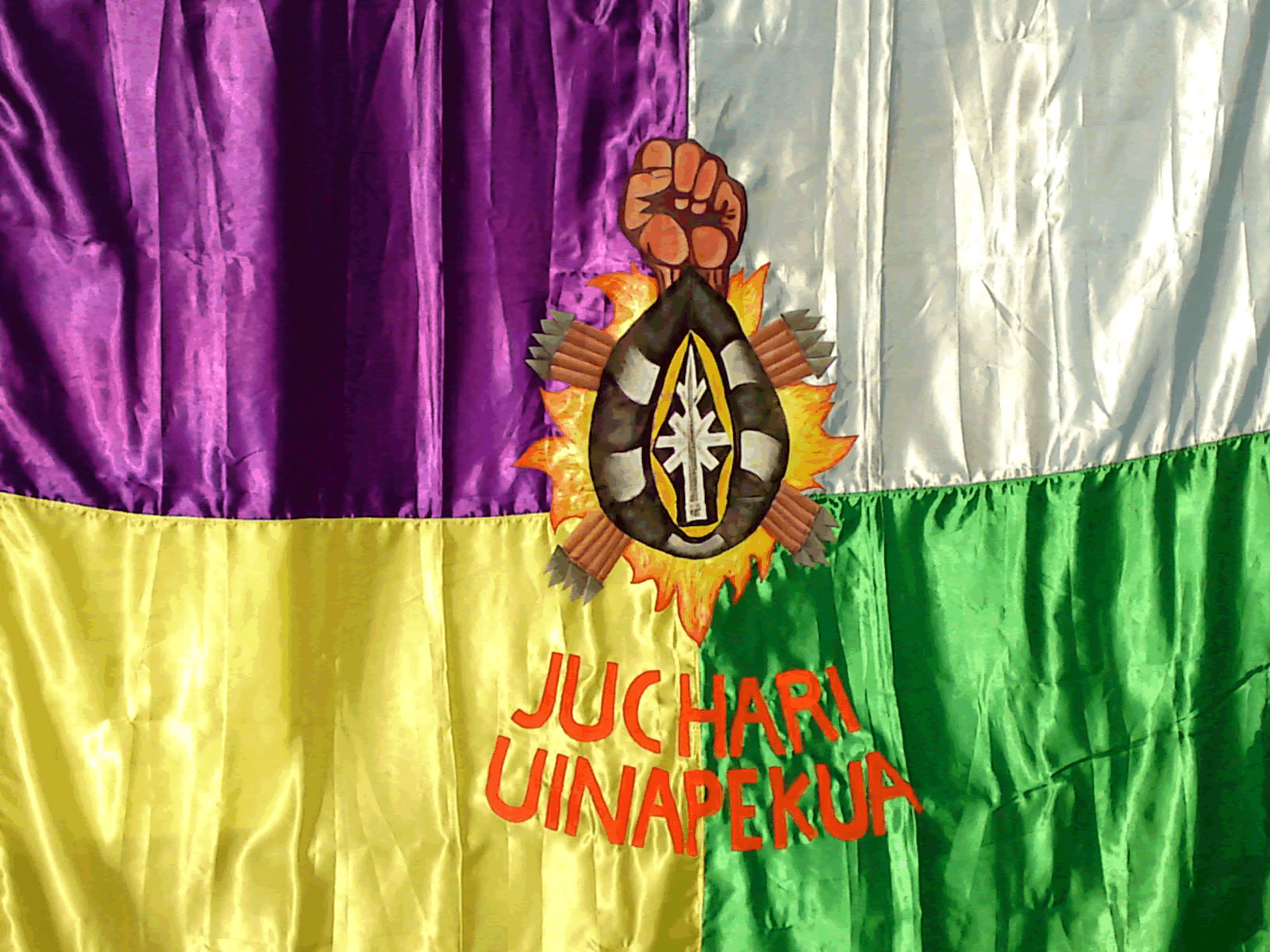
Purépecha flag (purh'epecha anhajkukua, in 1980.

In recent years, the Purépecha flag that appeared in 1980 emerged again. It is a civil insignia that uses the colors of the flag and began to have a strong presence in the Michoacán, especially in those who speak the Purépecha language. In the absence of a document that regulates the use of this emblem, it has taken a number of variants that do not correspond to symbolic ideas and have led to discussions about the historical design of the flag.
