= Julio García Estrada =

Mexican lawyer and notary

Julio Garcia Estrada (1923–2014) was a Mexican lawyer and notary. He was born in Patzcuaro, Michoacán on 20 December 1923. He died on June 10, 2014, at his residence in Acapulco, Mexico.

== Family ==
He was the son of Dr. Rafael Garcia Munguia and Maria Estrada Aceves. His maternal grandfather was the Notary, Enrique Estrada Villegas and his paternal grandfather was Dr. Gabriel Garcìa Romero. He was the father of Cuauhtémoc García Amor.

== Studies ==
He began his elementary studies at Vasco de Quiroga School and later moved to Mexico City where he attended junior high school at Secundaria Numero Tres. While attending Secundaria Numero Tres he met Luis Echeverría Álvarez and José López Portillo, who both later became Presidents of Mexico. He studied in the National School of Jurisprudence and became a member of generation 1941, There he was elected as the President of his school generation and reelected and continues to hold this position today. After law school he taught Civics at Secundaria 18 in Mexico City.

== Teacher ==
He later became the private secretary of the General Director of Professions in the National Secretary of Education. He was also a substitute teacher for Sociology at the National School of Jurisprudence. He later founded Acapulco High School where he taught Logic and Sociology.

== Notary and other activities ==
On March 11, 1949, Julio became a notary public in Acapulco. When Luis Echeverría Álvarez became the President of Mexico, Julio was appointed the Director General of Acquisitions of the Ministry of Communications and Transportations. Also he finish his doctorate at the university of Mexico with a private law specialization. He was designated academic number 12 of The National Academy of Notaries where he wrote 25 articles related to the Notarial Law that include well known, "El Fideicomiso" (The Trust), and the "Certificados de Participacion Inmobiliaria" (The Real Estate Certificates). He was the adviser and Vice President of the National Association of Notaries, President of the Junior Chamber of Acapulco, President of the Lions Club in Acapulco, Founder & President of Banco del Sur (South Bank), Adviser for Comermex Bank, Adviser for Banco Mexicano, President for the Regional Board of Banca Cremi.

== Awards ==
The National Association of Notaries gave him the medal "Francisco Vazquez Perez", and for his 50th year as a lawyer he received a medal from the "Asociacion Nacional de Abogados" (National Association of Lawyers). Today he is the oldest notary in the State of Guerrero and the second oldest in Mexico.
