= Curicaueri =

Purépecha God of Fire, Curicaueri

- God of Fire
- Member of Tiripe-mencha, Trinity of Fire
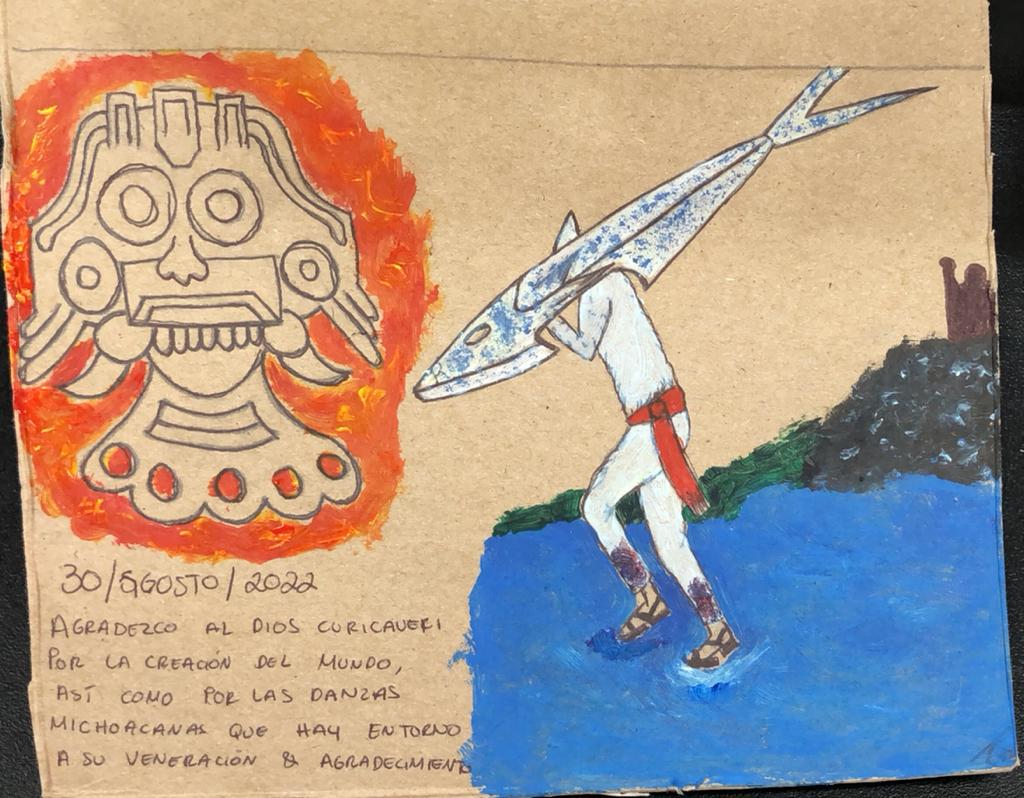
- Votive offering for Curicaueri, with a drawing of Curicaueri on the left
- Other names: Kurikaueri, Querenda-angápeti, Tatá juríata, Kurikaheri
- Animals: Turkey, Eagle, Coyote, Snake
- Gender: Male
- Region: Mesoamerica
- Ethnic group: Purépecha

Genealogy
- Siblings: Tiripe-mencha
- Spouse: Cuerauáperi
- Children: All other Purépecha Gods

Curicaueri (Purépecha: Kurhikuaeri, "the Great Fire" or "the Great Bonfire) is a deity in Purépechan Culture. He was considered the God of Fire, the Sun and oldest deity of the Purépecha, it is thought that he is the origin of all other Purépecha deities, alongside Cuerauáperi his wife. He also had a warlike aspect, who the warriors painted themselves black to represent. Curiacaueri had five brothers known as the Tiripe-mencha, who governed the five divine houses of the terrestrial plane of the universe.

The Uacúsecha clan, the ruling family of the Purepécha empire, considers Curicaueri their patron god, and it is through a prophetic vision from Curicaueri that Tariácuri set out to create a unified Purépecha state.

== Creation of the World ==
Eclipses are synonymous with life among the Purépecha people, it is when Curicaueri and Cuerauáperi come together, and it is said that everything in the universe was formed from four unions that they had between them:

In their first union; Cuerauáperi, in the midst of a furious storm, gave birth to the stars, constellations, planets, asteroids and everything that existed in outer space.

In their second union, she gave birth to the four elements: echeri (earth), curhi (fire), itsi (water) and tarhiáta (air).

In their third union, the trees, plants, flowers and animals were birthed. All this, in an effort to prepare the best habitat for the men and women to come.

In their fourth union she birthed the men and women, who she granted mítekua, knowledge, so that they could distinguish between good and evil, also giving them the gift of emitting sounds so that they could convert them into uandákua, words, and could praise their creator, and communicate with each other.

Though eclipses are synonymous with life, they can also be omens that there is a bad relationship between the Sun and Moon, consequently, a bad omen for the earth. Another belief in which they are involved is that pregnant women hide or put a red bow on their belly so that the eclipse does not cause harm to the child.

== Battle against Ahchurihirepe ==
His son, the old Sun, named Cupantziere, died every day in the west while playing ball with the Night, named Ahchurihirepe, but was resurrected each morning in the east by the young Sun, named Siratatáperi, grandson of Curicaueri and son of Cupantziere. Cupantziere's resurrected body takes the form of a deer upon resurrection that goes northwards. This battle is said to be contained within the echérendo, the underworld, by the sun. Among the Purépecha, deer were sacred animals and their skin was tanned and used to wrap the image of Curicaueri. Together they formed the Trinity of Fire: father, son and grandson. The Trinity of Fire was represented in the night sky by three stars that seemed to resemble a paráhtacuqua (an instrument that the Purépecha used to light fires with), these stars are Aldebaran, Beta and Gamma that are part of the Taurus constellation).

== Etymology ==
The name Curicaueri comes from Purépecha (Kurhikuaeri) and means "the great fire" or "the great bonfire." In the Zacapú region, Curicaueri was known as Querenda-angápeti "the rock that is in the temple". Another name for him is Tatá Juríata meaning "the one who makes the day"

== Iconography ==
The body of Curicaueri was often described as being painted black, with the lower part of his face, fingernails and toenails painted yellow. In his honor, the Irecha and priests, painted themselves in a likewise manner. On his head he wore a white fur headband, and on his back he wore a heron feather ornament.

In his warlike aspect, he is represented with a white flag. The Purépecha warriors would paint their bodies black in his honour, to represent the same battle that the sun has every night with the stars (Purépecha: auándaro, "in the house of the rabbits") which is interpreted in their ball game, where the sun is represented as the ball. In the battle with the stars, he is said to fire his sun rays like arrows, with which he defeats the four hundred star warriors.

In the Relación de Michoacán there are three descriptions of this deity. He is presented as a white eagle with a large wart on his forehead; he also appears as a character painted all black with white heron plumage on his head and back; and the most frequent description is of him described as “…that stone that they said was the god Curicaueri himself.”

== Worship ==
Curicaueri's main offerings were tobacco, blankets and blood; the tobacco was thrown into a fire in the form of pellets and it was believed that its smell pleased Curicaueri, the blood from bloodletting was also thrown in the fire. When a person died as a victim of lightning or "fire from heaven," they were deified. Among the Purépecha is a common belief that if they stop worshipping the sun, it will punish them with terrible illnesses and rains that would destroy their crops.

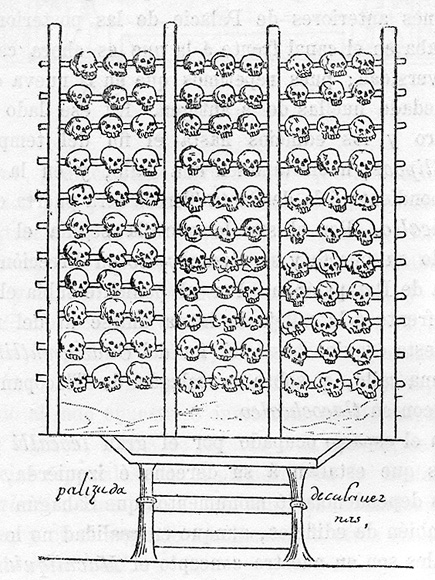
The aztec Tzompantli, taken from the 16th C. Aztec manuscript, Codex Duran

The entire religious life of the Purépecha people and their rituals revolved around bonfires; the smoke they produced was the only contact between men and the gods of the firmament, who fed on it. The importance of the bonefires was so great that the Irecha themselves had to collect firewood to keep the bonfires lit, and it would be there where they were eventually cremated. His priests, received the title of curiti or curita, from cura "grandfather". The main priest received the title Curi-htsit-acha "the lord who arranges the fire" and there were also the Curi-pecha "those who arrange the fire in the temples."

He is represented by animals such as the turkey, which only Purépecha priests and lords were allowed to consume, as well as the eagles that were kept in captivity in the house of the Irecha. Curicaueri had many transformations, but most common are the ones he uses for traveling the Purépecha universe; the eagle for the sky, the coyote on the earth, and the snake in the underworld.

War-captives were usually sacrificed in the midst of great ceremonies, where the sacrificed person took on the identity of Curita-Caheri, the celestial messenger of Curicaueri. The victims were prepared by getting them drunk and powdered with corn flour. They were then taken to the iyapáraqua or sacrificial slab. Here they were held by the hands and feet by the Hupitiecha "supporters", and the Axame "sender" extracted their hearts. Later, the Quiquiecha were in charge of placing the heads of the sacrificed in the eraquaréquaro, the equivalent of the Nahua tzompantli. What remained of the deified body of the victim was prepared with corn and beans, to later be consumed.

== See also ==
- Purépecha Empire
- Purépecha deities
- Purepécha Culture
