= Purépecha religion =

Traditional religion of the Purépecha

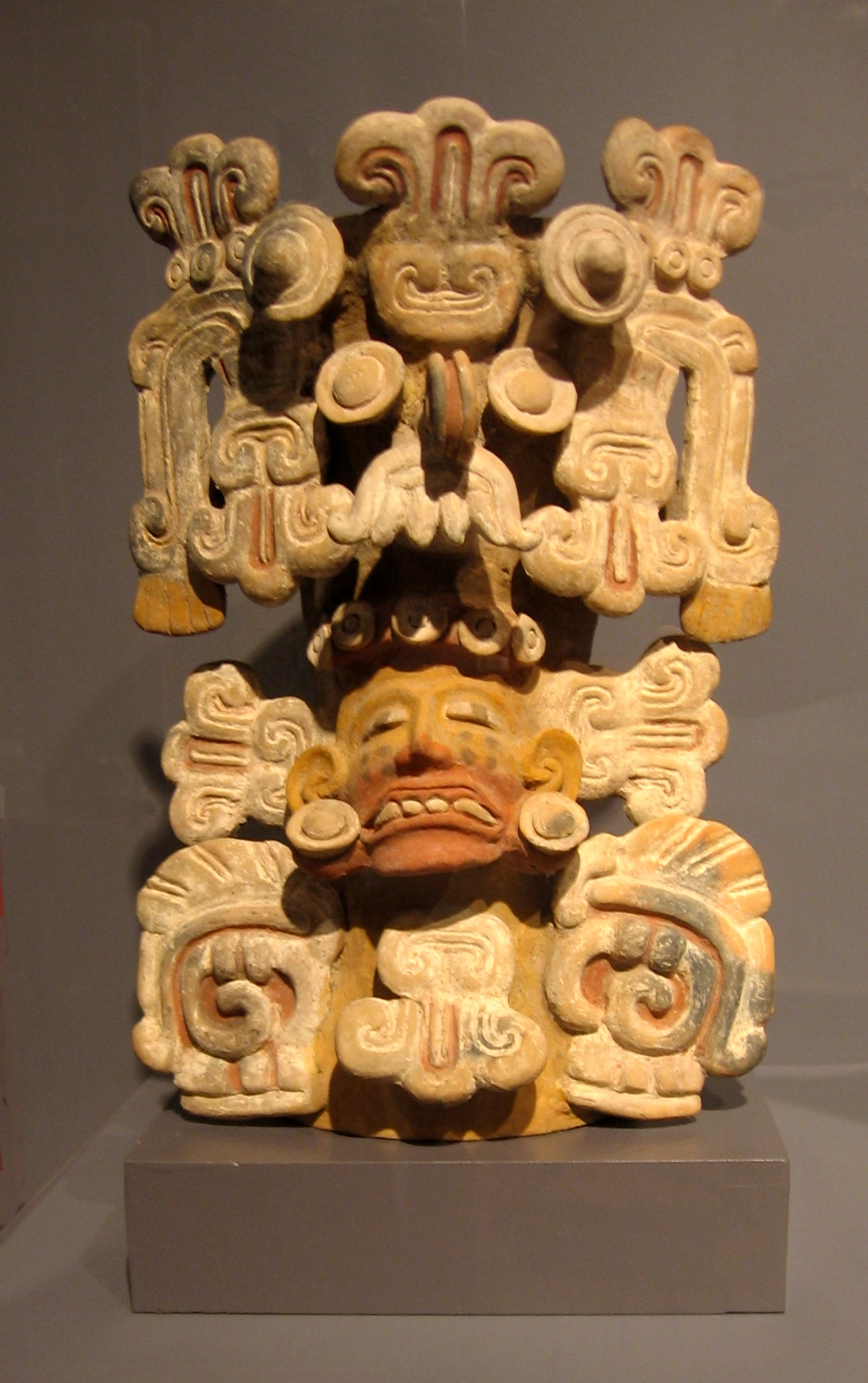
Tarascan incense burner showing a deity with a "Tlaloc" headdress, 1350-1521 CE

The Purépecha religion is the religion of the Purépecha people.

== See also ==
- Purépecha deities
