= Gertrudis Bocanegra =

Female Spy during the Mexican Independence War

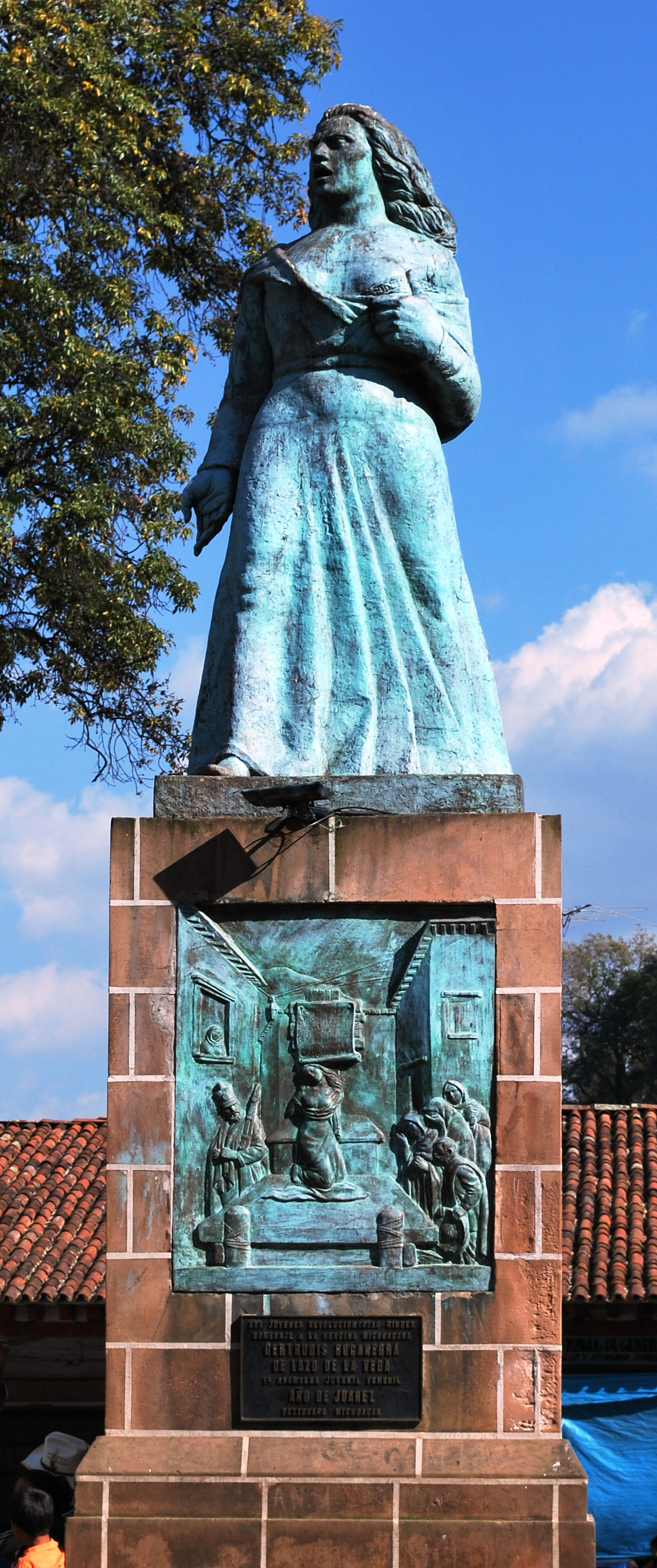
- A monument in honor of Gertrudis Bocanegra in the plaza that bears her name in central Pátzcuaro, Michoacán
- Born: María Gertrudis Teodora Bocanegra Lazo Mendoza; April 11, 1765; Pátzcuaro, Bishopric of Michoacán, New Spain
- Died: October 10, 1817 (aged 52); Pátzcuaro, Intendancy of Valladolid, New Spain (now Pátzcuaro, Michoacán, Mexico)
- Cause of death: Firing squad
- Known for: Female Spy for the Mexican Insurgency
- Spouse: Pedro Advíncula de la Vega
- Children: 4
- Military career
- Allegiance: Mexican Insurgency
- Branch: Insurgent Army
- Battles/wars: Mexican War of Independence; Capture of Pátzcuaro

María Gertrudis Teodora Bocanegra Mendoza (11 April 1765 – 11 October 1817) was a woman who fought in the Mexican War of Independence. She was arrested, tortured and executed in 1817.

== Early life ==
Gertrudis Bocanegra was born in Pátzcuaro in what is now the Mexican state of Michoacán, to Pedro Javier Bocanegra and Feliciana Mendoza (d. 15 November 1783). She married Lieutenant Pedro Advíncula Lazo de la Vega, a soldier in the Spanish provincial forces of Michoacán; they had six children (two sons and four daughters). Unusually for a woman of her time, Bocanegra had read the principal authors of the Age of Enlightenment. When Mexico's War of Independence began, she was quick to take sides. Her husband and eldest son joined the forces of Miguel Hidalgo y Costilla when the insurgents passed through Valladolid (now Morelia) in October 1810. Both died at the Battle of the Puente de Calderón. She then served as a messenger for the insurgents in the region of Pátzcuaro and Tacámbaro, helping to form a communications network between the principal locations of the rebellion.

During the guerrilla war, she was sent to Pátzcuaro to aid the rebels in the capture of the city. However, she was betrayed and taken prisoner by the royal army in 1817. She was subjected to torture to get her to reveal the names of other rebels, but she refused to give information to the Spaniards. Finally she was tried and found guilty of treason.

Sentenced to death, she and one of her fellow insurgents were executed on 11 October 1817 at the Plazuela de San Agustín in Pátzcuaro. Facing the firing squad, she harangued her executioners before she was shot. She was 51 years old.

== Legacy ==
A Library in honor of Gertrudis Bocanegra in Pátzcuaro, Michoacán

She is known in Mexico as "La Heroína de Pátzcuaro" (The Heroine of Pátzcuaro). A plaza was named in her honor in that city, and a bronze statue was erected of her.

== In popular culture ==
Bocanegra was portrayed by Ofelia Medina in the Mexican biographical film Gertrudis (1992).

== Sources ==
- This article is a loose translation of the Spanish Wikipedia article
- Salmonson, Jessica Amanda (1991). The Encyclopedia of Amazons. Paragon House. page 35. ISBN 1-55778-420-5
- (in Spanish) "Bocanegra de Lazo de la Vega, Gertrudis," Enciclopedia de México, v. 2. Mexico City, 1988.
