= Santa Fe de la Laguna =

- Interactive map of Santa Fe de la Laguna
- Coordinates: 19°40′23″N 101°33′22″W
- Country: Mexico
- State: Michoacán
- Municipality: Quiroga

Population
  - Total: 5,393

Santa Fe de la Laguna is a Purépecha settlement in the Mexican state of Michoacán. Located 27 kilometers from Patzcuaro, it preserves the culture and customs of the Purépecha people. Pottery is the principal industry and Santa Fe de la Laguna's inhabitants make colorful handmade pieces with a variety of shapes and colors. The director Lee Unkrich made the town his base while creating the Pixar film Coco.

== History ==
The town was founded in 1533.
