= Antonio Cuauhtémoc García Amor =

Mexican politician

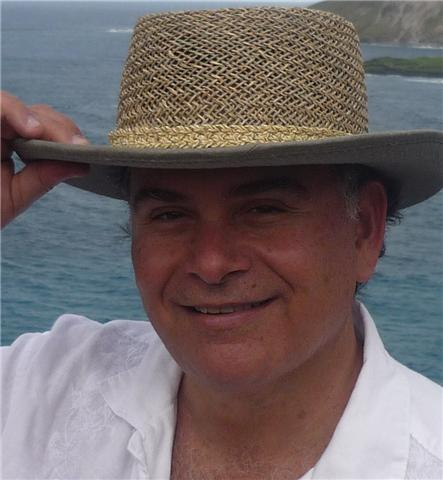
Cuauhtémoc García Amor

Cuauhtémoc García Amor (born October 27, 1955; Julio Antonio Cuauhtemoc Garcia Amor in Acapulco, Mexico) is a Mexican lawyer and politician.

== Family ==
He is the son of Notary Public Julio García Estrada and Elena Amor Zamacona. He is the grandchild of Dr. Rosendo Amor Esparza and Dr. Rafael Garcia Munguia. Antonio Cuauhtemoc is a devout Catholic and is married to Maria E. Garcia with two daughters, Michelle & Nicole.

== Academic degrees ==
Cuauhtemoc began his elementary studies at La Salle School in Acapulco and continued through high school and college also at La Salle University in Mexico City (1970–1980). He earned his law degree at La Salle University also in Mexico city. Other studies: Include a diploma from the University of Paris (Sorbonne) in French Language and French Civilization (1975). From 1980-1983 he studied Public Finances. He makes studies for a doctorate in the University of Mexico. He holds a doctorate in International Law from P. Western University (open system). Doctoral dissertation: The General Agreement on Tariffs and Trade, and The Diverse Opinions.

== Teaching ==
He taught Fiscal Law and Introduction to the Study of Law at the Iberoamericana U. in Mexico City. He was the Director of the School of Law at the American University in Acapulco (Universidad Americana de Acapulco) where he also taught Contracts and Obligations and Civil Law. He taught Notarial Law at the Universidad Loyola del Pacifico.

== Public office ==
Other participation: Private Secretary of the Director General of the Mexican National Tourist Counsel (1977–1983), Head of the office of Fisheries in Baja California (1984), Administrative Auxiliary Secretary of the Governor of the State of Mexico (1985–1986), Director General of the Convention Center of Acapulco (1988), Notary Public in Acapulco since 1992.

== Political activities ==
He ran for mayor of Acapulco in 1993 as the PAN candidate and was a Federal Substitute Congressman LVI Legislature of PAN 1994-1997. He was also the candidate of PAN for Senator in the State of Guerrero in the year 2000 and received 131,442 votes. He was Congressman in the state of Guerrero, Mexico, Independent Congressman LVII Legislature 2002-2005.

== Writer ==
He has written four books: History of the Notarial Law (Historia del derecho Notarial), The Will (El Testamento), The Real Estate Sale (La Compraventa Inmobiliaria), and The Condominium ('El Condominio), distributed by Casa Trillas.
