= Princess Eréndira =

Mexican princess

Eréndira
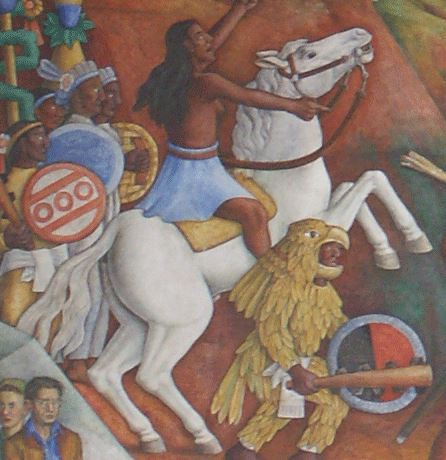
- Princess Eréndira on horseback, painted by Juan O'Gorman.
- Reign: 1503–1529
- Born: 1503; Tzintzuntzan, in Purépecha Empire
- Died: 1529 (aged 25); Kingdom of New Galicia
- Father: Tangáxoan Tzíntzicha
- Mother: Guatique Uacujane

Princess Eréndira of the Purépecha was the princess of the Purépecha from c. 1503–1529.

== Life ==
Eréndira was 16–17 when the Spanish came to Mexico. The Tarascan state's cazonci (monarch), Tangaxuan II, had given up his kingdom and people to the Spanish after he saw the downfall of the Aztec Empire to the Spanish. The story of princess Eréndira's subsequent role as a heroine is based on tradition and may or may not reflect actual events, since there are no contemporary records of her existence.

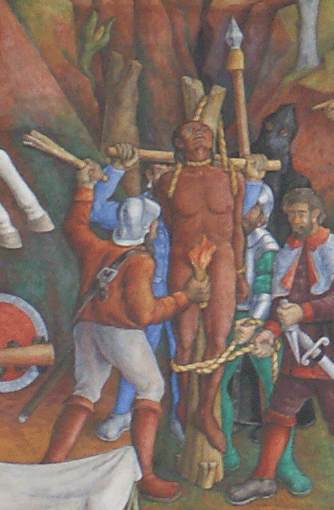
The execution of Eréndira's father, painted by Juan O'Gorman.

According to the folk legend, Eréndira organized a ceremony in the temple of Charatanga, the moon goddess, and a horse was sacrificed. The next day, a Spanish warrior named Cristobal de Olid approached Tzintzuntzan with a large troop of soldiers.

She had promised a Purépecha man named Nanuma that if he returned from the battle victorious, they would get married, and he led his people into battle. He succumbed to fear of the Spanish weapons and horses and tried to run from the battlefield, but was captured by Cristobal de Olid, and without a leader the Purépecha warriors were quickly defeated.

Cristobal de Olid punished Nanuma's cowardice by forcing him and his men to serve food to the Spanish army. In order to capture the Eréndira's father, Tangaxuan, Cristobal de Olid gathered together the Purépecha warriors and lead them into battle, betraying their own people. Leading them was Nanuma, who was promised a Purépecha woman if he cooperated, and he had Eréndira on his mind. Eréndira gathered together the people of Tzintzuntzan, and attacked the invading army from atop a hill, defeating Nanuma and his warriors. Once again, Nanuma fled. Eréndira's army had captured a white Spanish horse, which they planned to sacrifice, but Eréndira requested that she keep it. She tamed the animal, and they soon became inseparable, with Eréndira even allowing it to sleep in her home.

After a period of peace, Nanuma finally returned to ambush Tzintzuntan, planning to take Eréndira for a slave if she did not marry him. Eréndira escaped on her horse and ran away. With Eréndira gone, her father, the cazonzci, converted to Catholicism and invited a Franciscan friar named Fray Martin to the city. He destroyed the images of the Purépecha gods. Fray Martin converted and baptized many Purépecha people, but suspected that Tangaxuan was secretly still a pagan. For this he had a Spanish warrior named Nuño de Guzmán burn him at the stake. When Eréndira learned that her father had been killed, she used her horse to begin an underground resistance against the Spanish.

There are many theories as to what happened to her. Some of which include her suicide by drowning, her leaving to train others for war and that she killed herself for falling in love with a Spanish monk. One legend even claims that she was kidnapped by her own people and put into a temple so that the Spaniards should not find and kill her.

== Legacy ==
When Lázaro Cárdenas was governor of Michoacán, he built a house in Pátzcuaro, which he named "La Quinta Eréndira." She had been a regional figure, but as governor and president, Cárdenas raised her name recognition significantly. She became a symbol of indigenous resistance to the Spanish conquest, specifically as a foil to the role of Cortés's indigenous cultural translator Malinche.

Cárdenas commissioned muralist Fermín Revueltas to paint murals of Purépecha history and reshape the national narrative from one focused on the Aztecs to one rooted in the indigenous people of Michoacán. The story of Eréndira was also used to reshape "Mexico's nation-building ideology of mestizaje" and put the "Purépecha past...as the ideal origin of the Mexican nation."

== In popular culture ==
The movie Erendira Ikikunari (Erendira the Untameable) is based on the story of Eréndira.
