= Purépecha deities =

Gods of an indigenous Mexican group

The culture of the Purépecha people was polytheist.

List of some deities:

- Curicaueri - sun god (victory god)
- Cuerauáperi - Creation goddess
- Xarátanga - Water god
- Cuitzeo - war god
- Auicamine - Evil goddess
- Pehuame - Birth goddess (advocation of Cuerauáperi)
- Jurhiata - (advocation of Curicaveri)

Name	Comment
Curicaueri	“The Great Fire”, main deity with a black-painted body and long black hair that had the ability to light on fire. The lower part of the face as well as the feet, nails and hands were painted yellow, and he wore a white skin headpiece and a heron feather ornament on his back. Accordingly, the cazonci, priests and chiefs were painted black, and kept their hair long as a symbol of their patron god. Three descriptions of this deity exist in the Relacion de Michoacán: "Depicted as a white eagle with a large wart in the forehead; also a personage covered with charcoal dust (Entiznado)” with white heron plumages on his head and back; and most frequently he is described as “… that stone said to be God Curicaueri.” According to mythological stories the God Curicaueri was identified with the sun and victory.
Cupantziere	The old sun “Cupantziere” plays ball with “Ahchurihirepe” that represents the night. The old sun is defeated, but his son, the young sun “Siratatáperi” arises by the east and rescues his father's corpse, who resurrects in the form of a deer that goes away to the north. The deer were considered sacred animals associated to the sun in diverse Mesoamerican cultures, as divine food. Among the tarascos its skin was tanned and used to cover the Curicaueri image.
Cuerauaperi	“The one who unties in the womb,” associated with birth and considered the mother of all Gods, men, animals and plants. Her main sanctuary was in Zinapécuaro.
Curitacaheri	The great priest and Sun's Messenger, related to the Sea God who received offerings from shells.
Urendequauecara/Hurendequauecara	Morning star related to Venus and the eastern region. Related to Pungarancha War God.
Tiripemes/Tiripemencha	Gods of the “four parts of the world” considered Curicaueri siblings: Tiripeme-xungápeti, “the yellow God” north deity, lord of Pichátaro; Tiripeme-turupten, “the white God” west deity, lord of Iramuco; Tiripeme-caheri, “the black God” south deity, lord of Pareo and; Tiripeme-quarencha, “the red God” east deity, lord of Curínguaro.
Angamu Curacha	Were the forest gods.
God of Hell	The Cuingo celebration sacrifices (skin removal) were dedicated to the God of hell.
Paráhtacuqua	This is the Purépecha name for the asterism The Southern Cross. Paráhtacuqua is the Purépecha word for a fire drill, and the Southern Cross was visualized as such, and worshiped. The Southern Cross appears at a very low angle when seen from Michoacán because of its declination, but would have been an awe inspiring sight when seen from the Southern Hemisphere, at an altitude. The worship of this asterism has been used to bolster the case that the Purépecha came from the Southern Hemisphere, and migrated further north before settling in Michoacán.
Xaratanga	“The one who appears on top” or “the one who illuminates or shines”, goddess of the moon and maintenance, she made plants germinate and took care of men and animals. Like other goddesses associated with the moon in Mesoamerican cultures, one of her characteristics was her relationship with love, sex and Octli (pulque).
