= Erongarícuaro =

Coordinates: 19°35′N 101°43′W

- Town
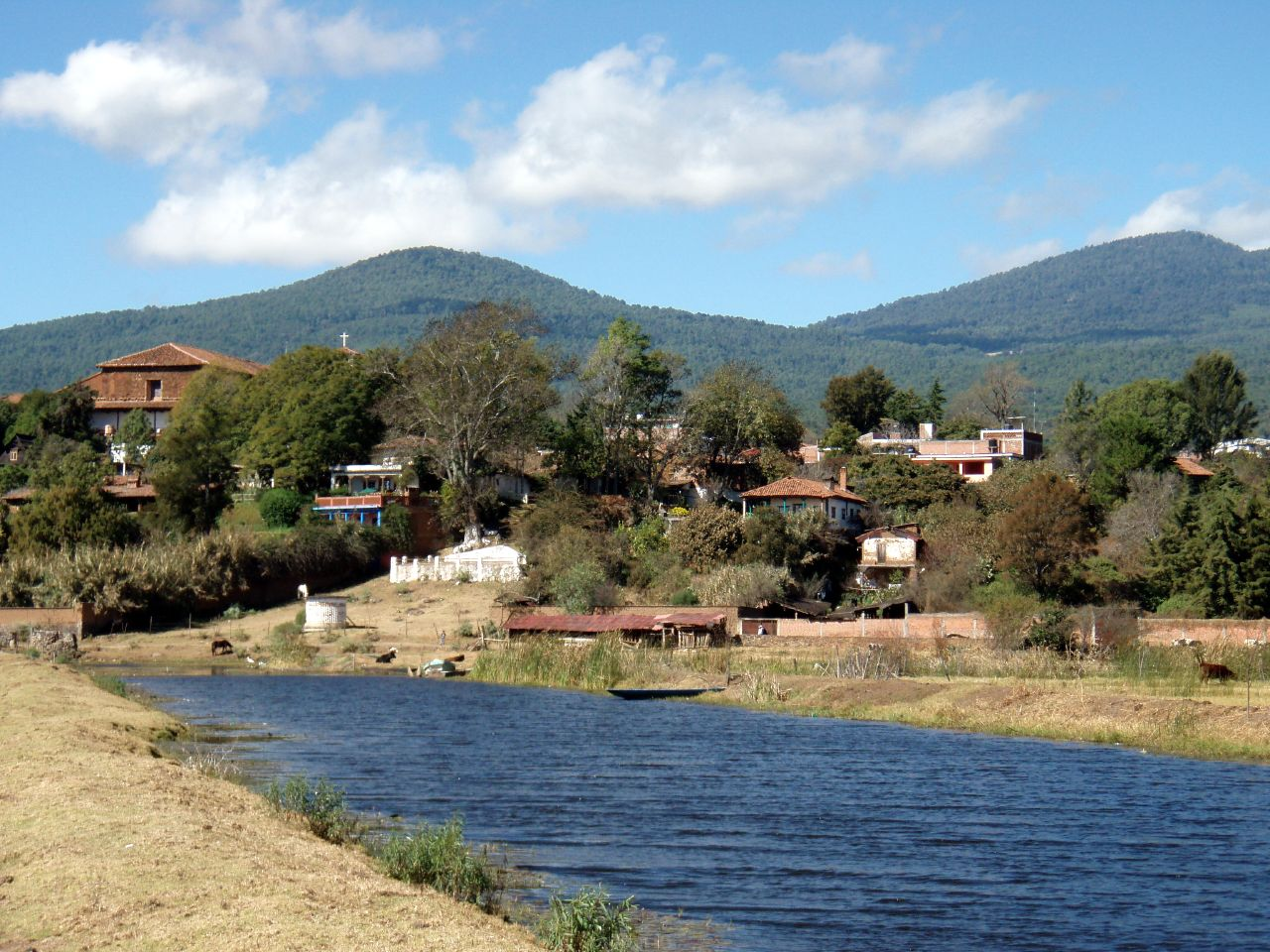

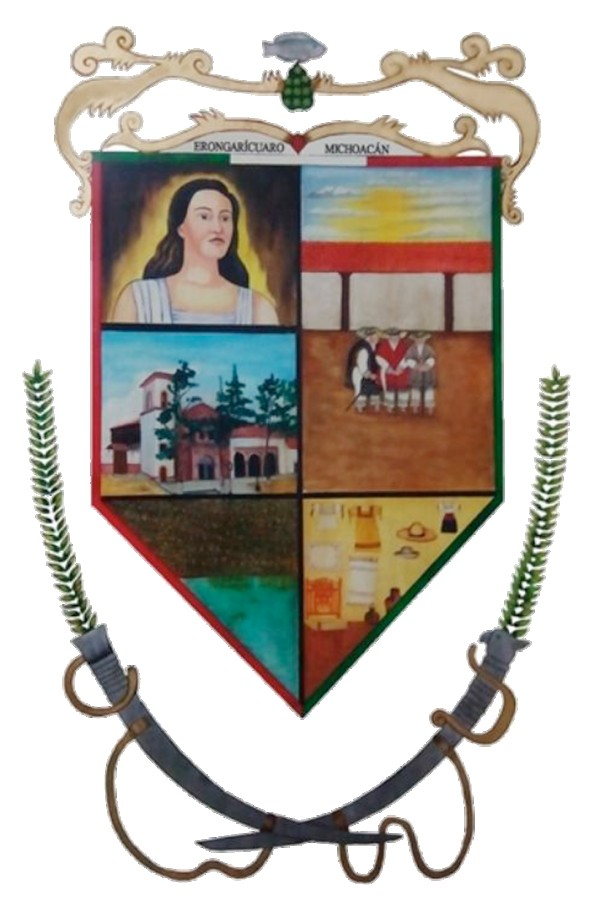
- Coat of arms
- Nickname: Eronga
- Interactive map of Erongarícuaro
- Country: Mexico
- State: Michoacán

Population
  - Total: 5,000
- Time zone: UTC-6 (Central Standard Time)
- Postal code: 61630

Erongarícuaro, which means "Place of waiting" in the Purepecha language, is a town in the Mexican state of Michoacán. It is located about an hour drive to Morelia or Uruapan and just 25 minutes from the famous colonial town of Pátzcuaro. The estimated population is about 7,000 people.

== The town ==
Erongarícuaro is hidden high in the mountains of Michoacán at 2,200 m (7,130 feet) of elevation. To the east is Lake Pátzcuaro, one of Mexico's highest lakes.

The town retains its ancient atmosphere. It consists of largely one-story adobe or plaster-over-brick buildings with red tile roofs. The streets are dusty cobblestones traveled by horse and car. The plaza has a fountain, stage and amazing collection of trees.

Wandering the streets uphill, there is a cemetery and a chapel.

== Culture ==
- Annual Flower Show
- Tuesday Goodness Market - with homemade breads and cheeses

== Entertainment ==
Jaripeos, parties and festivals are common throughout the year.

== Food ==
The nieve (ice cream) is sold in shops on the plaza. There are many different flavors, including those made with water or cream. One of the most popular flavors is called pasta (paste).

Except for early evening there is always food on the plaza. Food in the evening would be atole (hot beverage) with buñuelos (light fried pastries) or tamales.

== Shopping ==
- Women's craft market
- Furniture and woodcrafts

== Notable people ==
- Lázaro Cárdenas - The popular leftist President of Mexico was rumored to take his boat across the lake where no road reached. He began from his large mansion in Pátzcuaro, which now houses CREFAL.
