= Eduardo Casar =

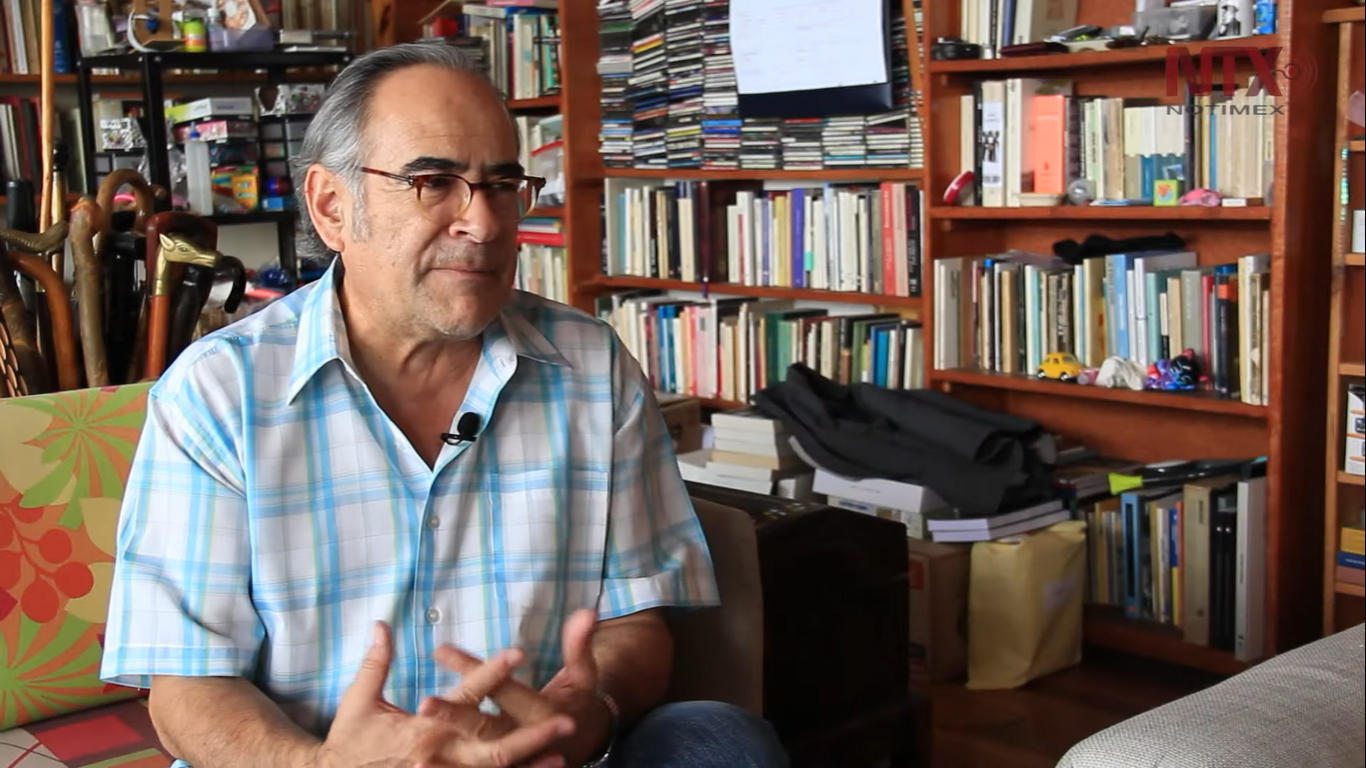
Eduardo Casar on 2019.

Eduardo Casar González (Mexico City, 6 March 1952) is a Mexican writer and professor of literature.

== Life and work ==
He has a doctorate on Hispanic Language and Literature by Language and Literature Faculty on UNAM with the work: "Paul Ricoeur and others´ utility on literary critics and creation". Nowadays he is a full-time professor in the University. At the same time teaches Literary composition on Mexican Writers General Society SOGEM, Writers´ School on Coyoacán.

He conducts since 1994 Voces interiores, a radio program from UNAM Cultural Vinculation General Direction and Radio Educación. Also, is a conductor on TV cultural show La dichosa palabra on Conaculta Canal 22.

He was laureated with different prices, like the Literary Essay Award José Revueltas and The International Award Bicentenary Letters "Sor Juana Inés de la Cruz".
