= Erendira Ikikunari =

- Directed by: Juan Mora Catlett
- Written by: Juan Mora Catlett
- Starring: Xochiquetzal Rodríguez
- Distributed by: David Distribucion
- Release date: 2006
- Running time: 117 min. (Mexican version); 107 min. (American version)
- Country: Mexico
- Languages: Spanish; Purépecha

Erendira Ikikunari is a 2006 drama film based on the story of Princess Eréndira.

== Plot ==
The plot is based on a mixture of folk mythology and oral tradition. When the Spanish come to take over Tenochtitlan, Eréndira rallies her people in order to defeat them.

== Home media ==
It was released on DVD on January 27, 2009. Special features include English subtitles. The Mexican version is 117 minutes long, while the American version is 107 minutes.
