= Purépecha =

Indigenous group of Michoacán, Mexico

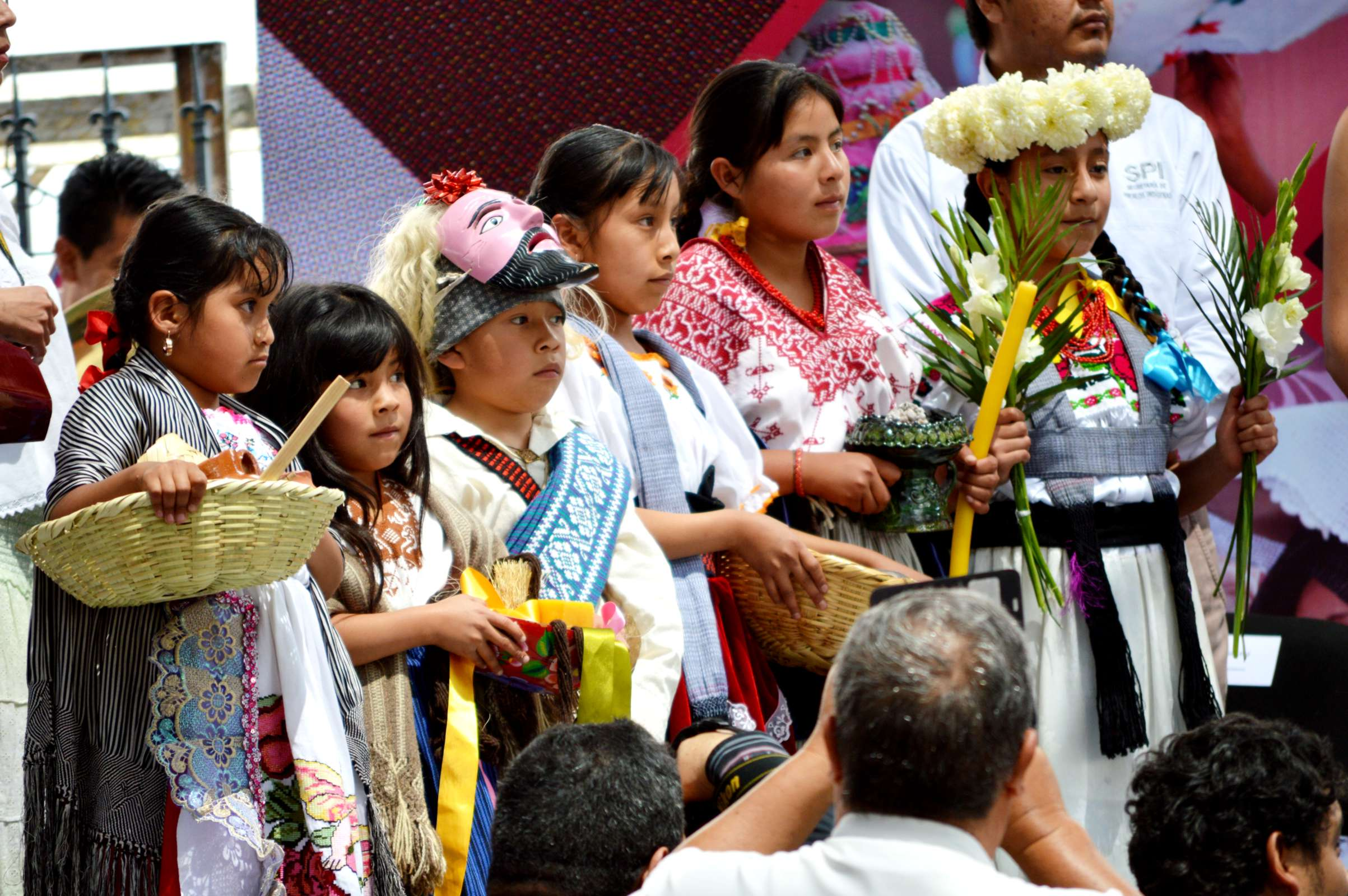
- Purépecha children at the 2015 Muestra de Indumentaria Tradicional de Ceremonias y Danzas de Michoacán Purépecha flag

Total population
- 544,010 (2022 census)

Regions with significant populations
- Michoacán, smaller communities in Jalisco, Guanajuato and Guerrero

Languages
- Spanish, Purépecha

Religion
- Roman Catholicism, Purépecha religion Location of the Purépechas in Michoacán

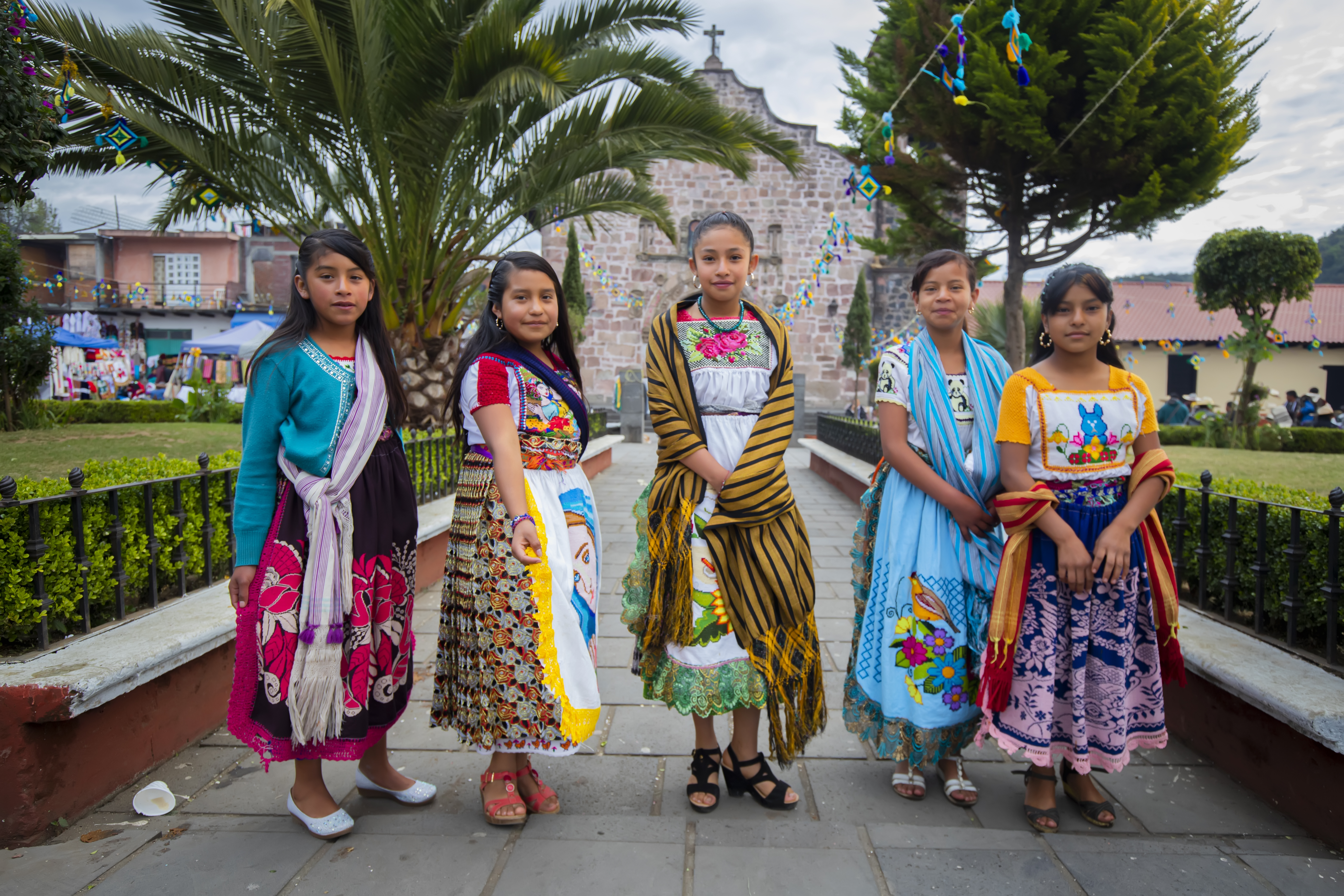
Purépecha girls dressed for a festival

The Purépecha (Western Highland Purepecha: P'urhepecha [pʰuˈɽepet͡ʃa]) are a group of Indigenous people centered in the northwestern region of Michoacán, Mexico, mainly in the area of the cities of Cherán and Pátzcuaro.

They are also known as "Tarascan", an exonym, applied by outsiders and not one they use for themselves. The name "Tarascan" (and its Spanish-language equivalent, "tarasco") comes from the word "tarascue" in the Purépecha language, which means indistinctly "father-in-law" or "son-in-law". The Spanish took it as their name, for reasons that have been attributed to different, mostly legendary, stories.

The Purépecha occupied most of Michoacán but also some of the lower valleys of both Guanajuato and Jalisco. Celaya, Acambaro, Cerano, and Yurirapundaro. Now, the Purépecha live mostly in the highlands of central Michoacán, around Lake Pátzcuaro and Cuitzeo.

== History ==
=== Prehispanic history ===
It was one of the major empires of the Pre-Columbian era. The capital city was Tzintzuntzan. Purépecha architecture is noted for step pyramids in the shape of the letter "T". Pre-Columbian Purépecha artisans made feather mosaics that extensively used hummingbird feathers, which were highly regarded as luxury goods throughout the region.

During the Pre-Colonial era, the Purépecha kingdom engaged in conflict with the Mexica. The Purépecha kingdom expanded through conquest. However, many avoided conquest and bloodshed and, in order to maintain their freedom, exchanged goods and resources such as metal with the Purépecha kingdom.

The Purépecha empire was never conquered by the Aztec Empire, in fact there is no record of the Aztecs ever defeating them in battle. Even though they were enemies with the Aztecs, the Aztecs still traded with them, mainly for metal tools and weapons.

=== Spanish era (1525–1821) ===
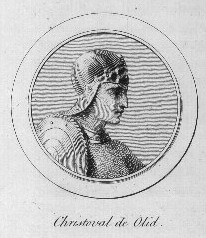
Cristóbal de Olid

After hearing of the Spanish conquest of the Aztec Empire and having the native population much diminished by an epidemic of smallpox, the cazonci Tangaxuan II pledged his allegiance as a vassal of the King of Spain without a fight in 1525. It is believed that the Spanish conquistador Cristóbal de Olid, upon arriving in the Purépecha Empire, now in present-day Michoacán, explored some parts of Guanajuato in the early 1520s. A legend relates of a 16- or 17-year-old Purépecha, Princess Eréndira, who led her people into a fierce war against the Spanish. Using stolen Spanish horses, her people learned to ride into battle. In 1529 to 1530, the Spanish forces entered Michoacán and some parts of Guanajuato with an army of 500 Spanish soldiers and more than 10,000 Native warriors.

In 1530, the president of the Real Audiencia, Nuño de Guzmán, a conquistador notorious for his ruthlessness and brutality towards the natives, plundered the region and executed Tangaxuan II, destroying the Purépecha State and provoking a chaotic situation and widespread violence. In 1533, the Crown sent an experienced Oidor (Judge of the Audiencia) and later bishop, Don Vasco de Quiroga, who established a lasting colonial rule. The lands of the Purépecha were subjected to serious deforestation during the Spanish Colonial period.

=== Post-independence history ===
==== Cárdenas era ====
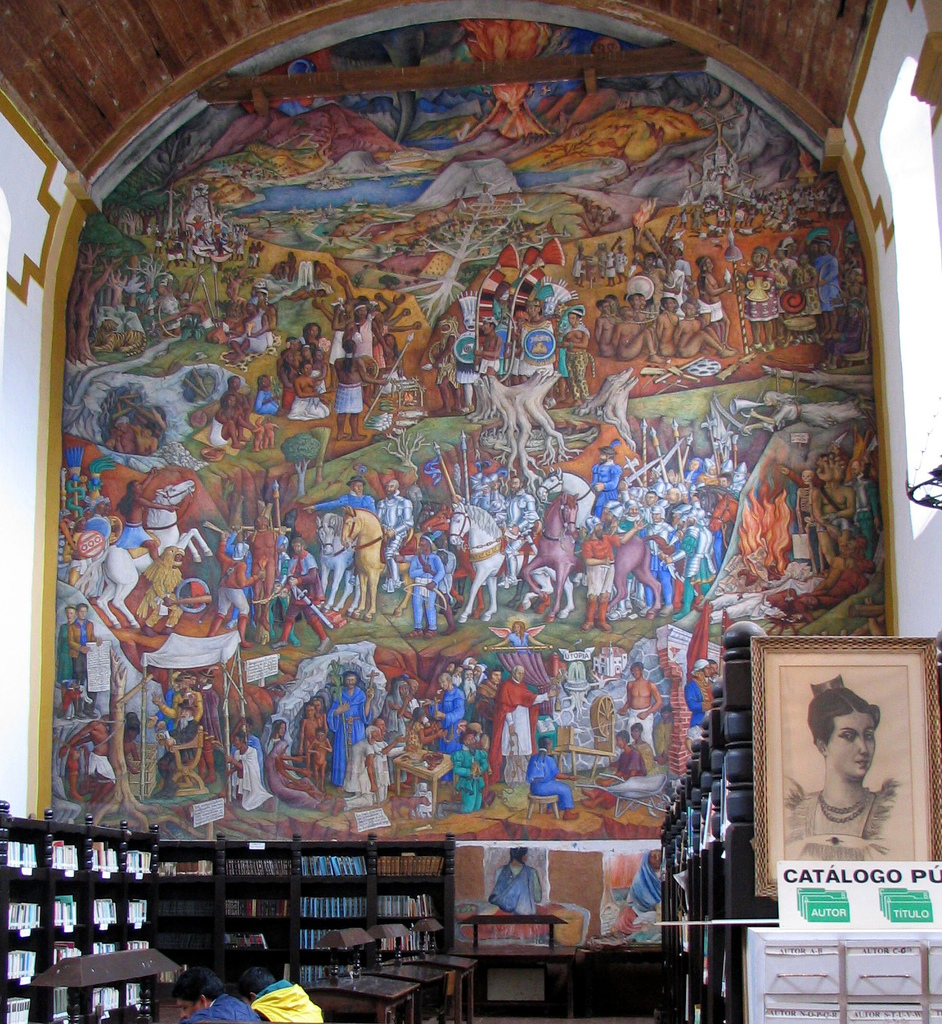
"La historia de Michoacán", mural in the Biblioteca Gertrudis Bocanegra, Pátzcuaro, Michoacán (1941–1942)

La Quinta Eréndira in Pátzcuaro

Following the Mexican Revolution (1910–1920), Michoacán experienced political unrest. When former revolutionary general Lázaro Cárdenas, originally from a small town in Michoacán, was appointed governor of his state, he began an ambitious program of reform and economic development, which he continued when he became president of Mexico (1934–40). For him, the Indigenous heritage of Michoacán was foundational for the construction of Mexico's post-revolutionary identity. Although the Aztecs loomed large in Mexican history and the construction of identity, Cárdenas saw the Purépecha as "purer" source. The Purépecha had never been conquered by the Aztecs, and in the era of the Spanish conquest of Mexico, the resistance of the Purépecha was a point of regional pride. In particular, Cárdenas promoted the story of Princess Eréndira who is said to have fought against the Spanish. He named the house he built in Pátzcuaro "La Quinta Eréndira" and commissioned muralists to depict Purépecha history in his residence and elsewhere. Purépecha traditions of folkloric performance became a source of indigenista pride.

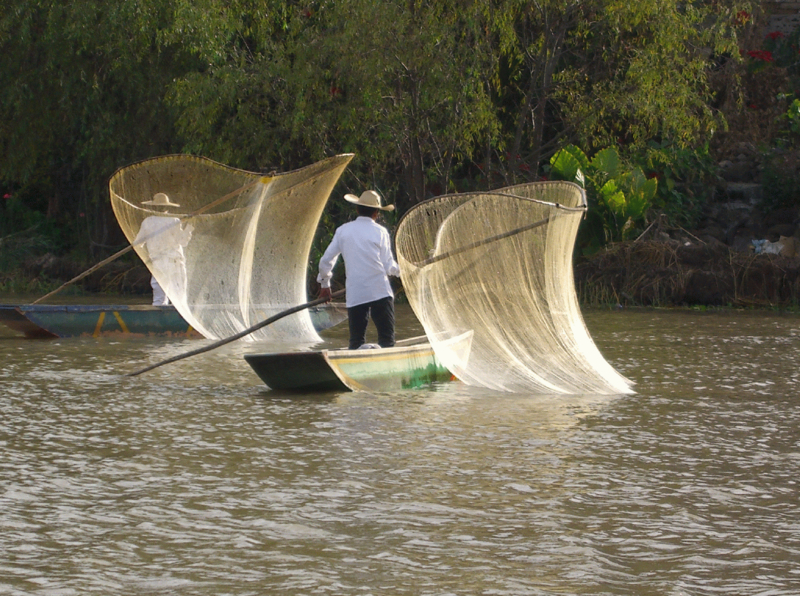
Fishermen in Lake Pátzcuaro

==== Emigration from Michoacán ====
In the late twentieth and early twenty-first century social scientists have studied Purépecha emigration from the region.

== Religion ==
Many traditions live on, including the Jimbani Uexurhina (New Fire), which is celebrated on 2 February. It has both traditional Indigenous and Catholic elements. The community lights a fire, called the chijpiri jimbani or "new fire," as part of a ceremony that honors the four elements. Mass is also celebrated in the Purhépecha language. They believed in God of the sky, earth, and underworld. The God of the sky and war, Kurikaweri. The Goddess of earth, controlling life and climate, Kweawaperi. The Goddess of the sea and the underworld, Xaratenga.

== Culture ==
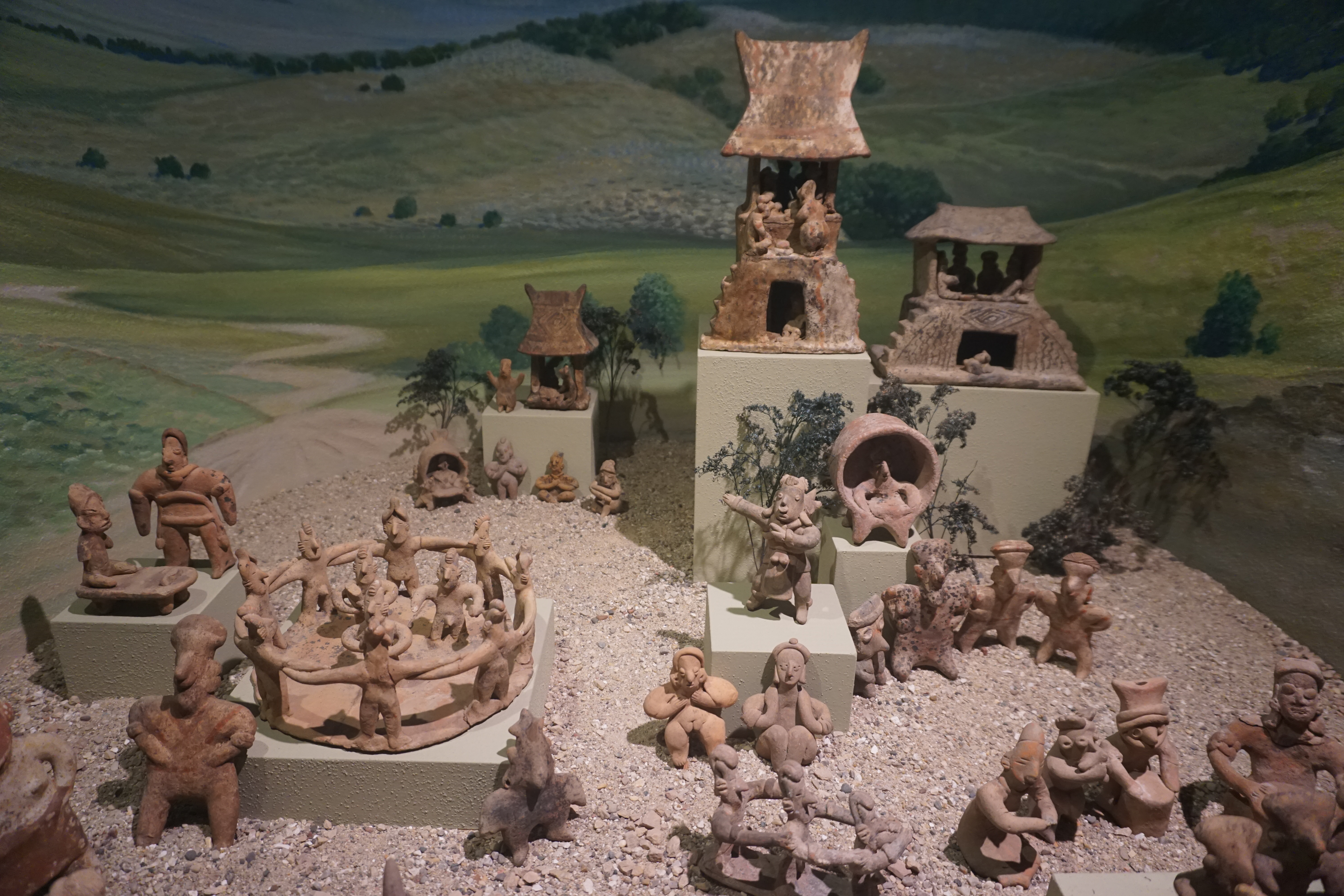
The Tarascan Village diorama at the Milwaukee Public Museum

The Purépecha are mainly fishers because they mainly lived around the Patzcuaro lakes. They are also known for their skill in weaving, pottery and their skill in battle. Many live in wooden cabins within compounds surrounded by dry-stone walls. However, many of these structures are being replaced with homes made out of brick and concrete. One distinctive practice of the Purépecha include the baptism of newborns after forty days of separate rest for the mother and child. The infant is then swaddled for six weeks and kept in physical contact with the mother or a close female relative. Temples created by Purépecha did not look like their Mesoamerican counterparts.

Purépecha today celebrate many holidays. One of the most popular holidays celebrated by the Purépecha is the Day Of The Dead or "Día De Los Muertos". While it is celebrated throughout Mexico in the same way, Purépechans celebrate slightly differently. On 1 and 2 November, family members take part in all-night vigils at the graves of their loved ones. Purépecha believe that the souls of the dead watch over their living relatives on the Day of the Dead.

In the town of San Juan Nuevo Parangaricutiro, which is a Purépecha town, unmarried men will dance the Dance of the Cúrpites. The dance is used to help the men express their masculinity and court their sweethearts. The dance is celebrated during the Christian holiday of Epiphany.

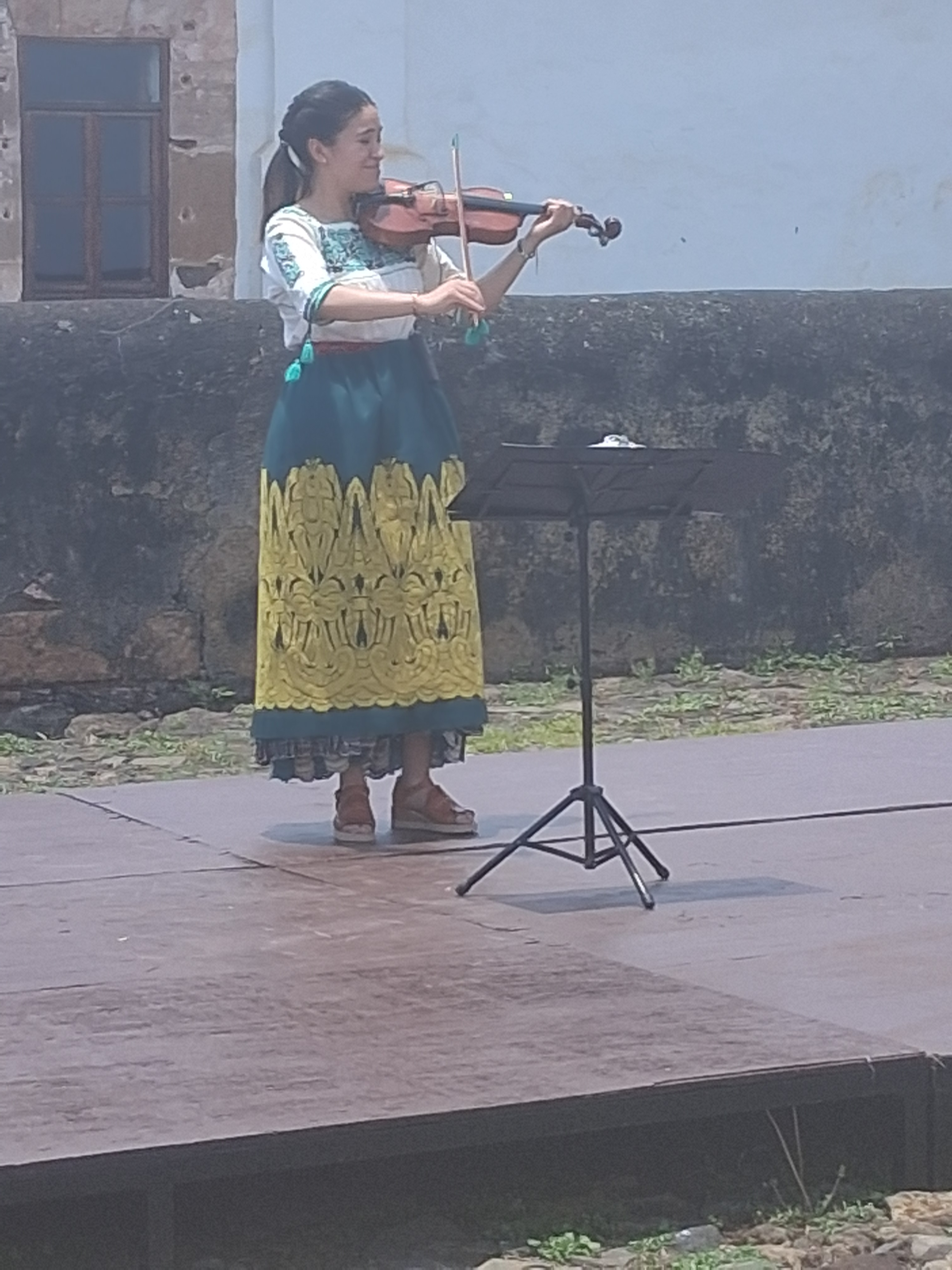
Apron showcasing hand embroidery

Embroidery is complex and uses traditional patterns with various techniques.

== Language ==
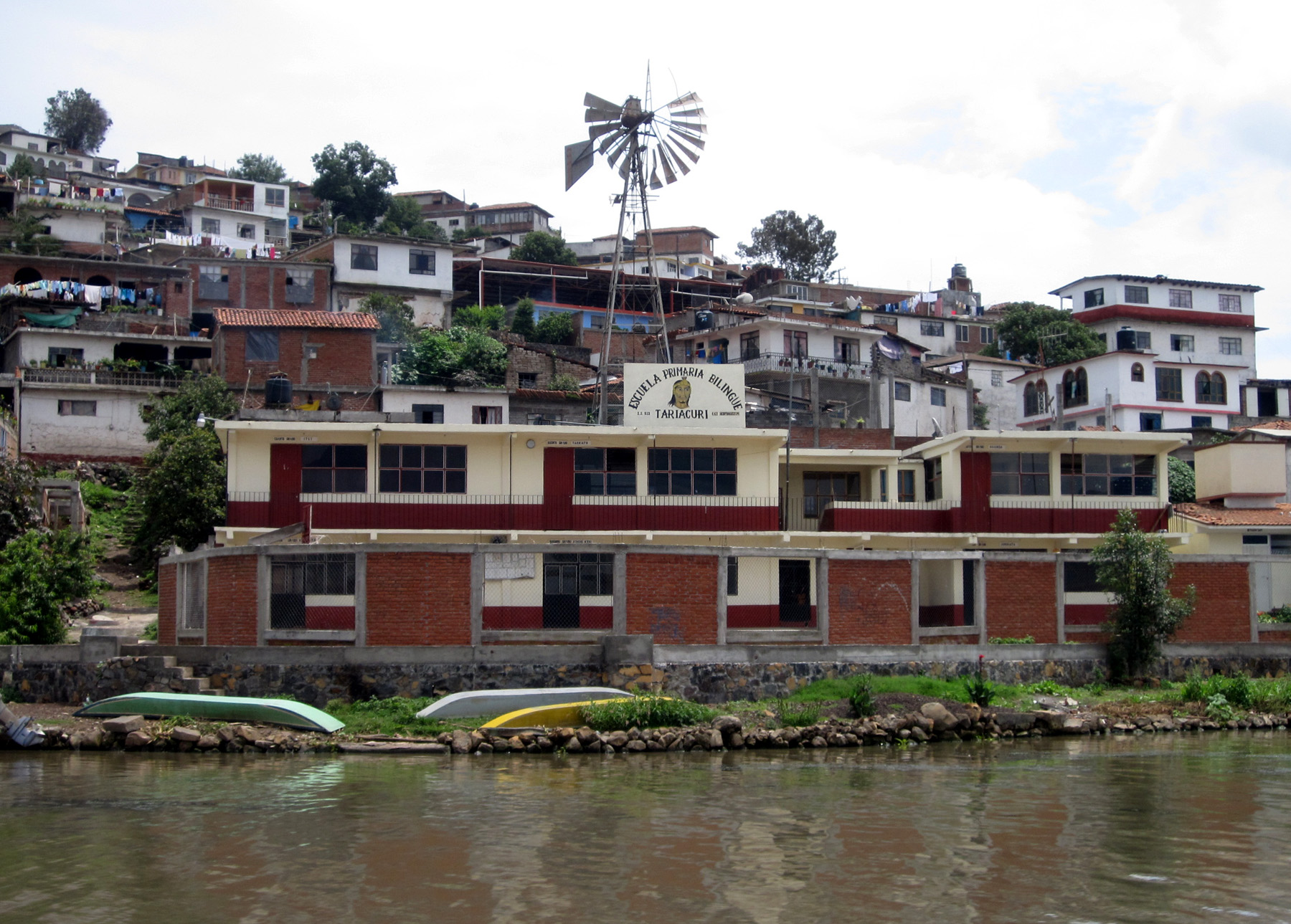
A bilingual Purepécha/Spanish school in the Purépecha community of Janitzio, Michoacán

The Purépecha language is spoken by nearly 200,000 people in Michoacán. Since Mexico's 2000 Indigenous language law, Indigenous languages like Purépecha were granted official status equal with Spanish in the areas in which they are spoken. Recently, educational instruction in Purépecha has been introduced in the local school systems. Additionally, many Purépecha communities offer classes and lessons in the language.

== In popular culture ==
Princess Eréndira of the Purépecha was depicted in the 2006 film Erendira Ikikunari (Erendira the Untamable).

The 2017 Disney film, Coco presents a character named "Mama Coco", who was apparently based on the real Purépecha woman María Salud Ramírez Caballero, although it was never officially confirmed by Pixar.

The 2022 film, Black Panther: Wakanda Forever, introduces Namor, whose mythos is rewritten to include an Indigenous Meso American background with influences from Mayan and Aztec culture. Tenoch Huerta, who portrays Namor, comes from a Purépecha background.

The 2024 film, The Casagrandes Movie, based on the Nickelodeon animated series The Casagrandes, has lead protagonist Ronnie Anne Santiago travel with her family to the fictional city of Japunda, which is largely based on the real-life Michoacán town of Pátzcuaro. The movie draws inspiration from director Miguel Puga's Purépecha heritage, and the director, along with cultural consultant Lalo Alcaraz, worked "to portray the P'urhépecha community in this universe — their customs, their food, their music."

'La Michoacana' ice cream (paleta) shops' logos often incorporate a girl in traditional Purépecha clothing as a nod to its origin in Michoacán, Mexico.

== See also ==
- Pirekua
- Pelota purépecha
- Purépecha deities
- Purépecha Empire
- Purépecha language
- Purépecha flag
- Tarascan Plateau
