= Rebozo =

Long, flat, shawl-like Mexican garment

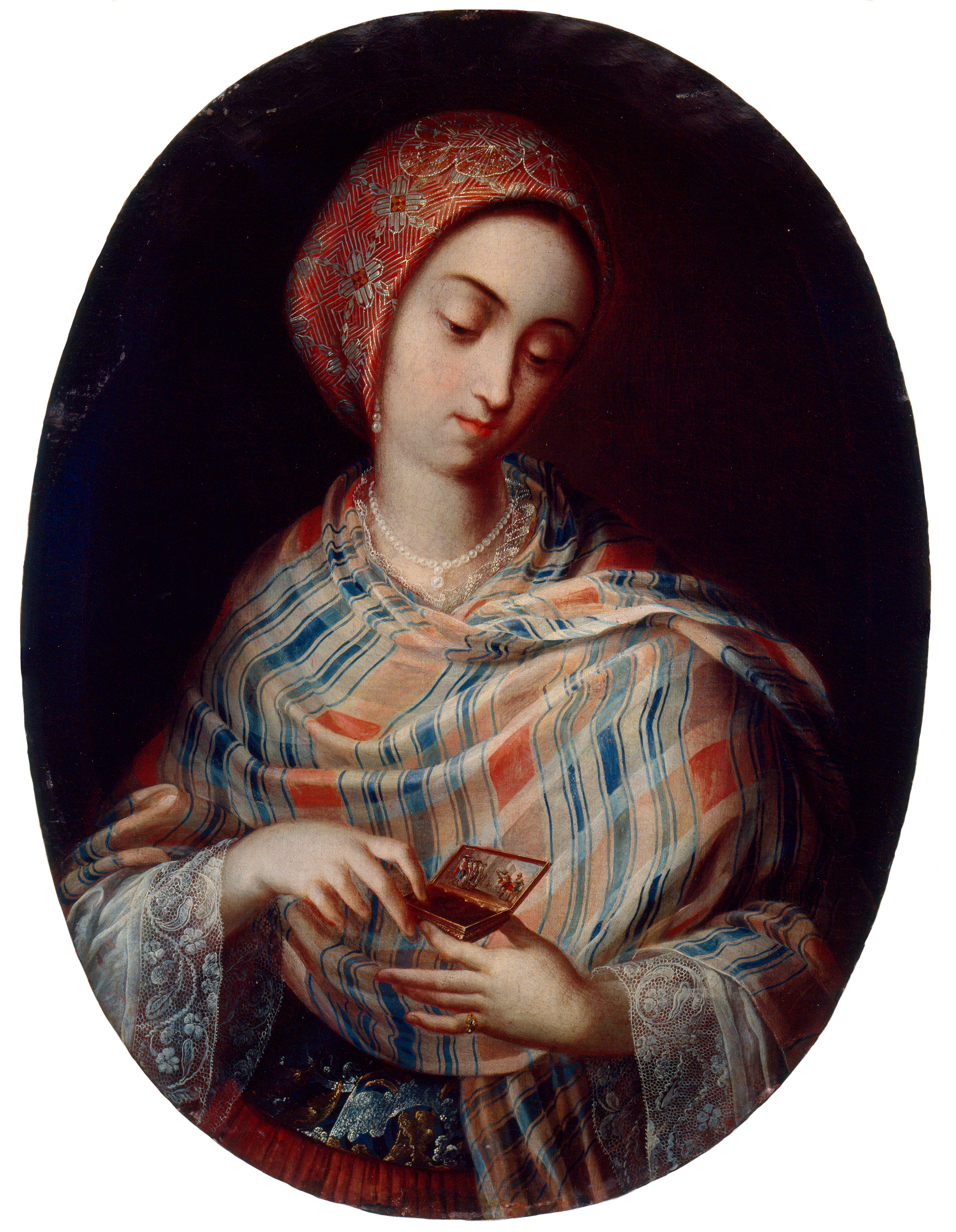
Painting of a woman with a rebozo Juan Rodríguez Juárez.

A rebozo is a long flat garment, very similar to a shawl, worn mostly by women in Mexico. It can be worn in various ways, usually folded or wrapped around the head and/or upper body to shade from the sun, provide warmth and as an accessory to an outfit. It is also used to carry babies and large bundles, especially among indigenous women. The origin of the garment is unclear, but Indigenous women of Mesoamerica were the primary weavers of the first rebozos, often crafted with body-tensioned or backstrap "otate" looms. Spaniards used it in religious situations to conceal the bare bodies of indigenous women. Rebozos were quickly influenced by the fringed shawls of the Philippines and Spanish mantillas as a result of colonization. Traditional versions of the garment show indigenous, European and Asian influences. Traditional rebozos are handwoven from cotton, wool, silk and rayon in various lengths but all have some kind of pattern (usually from the ikat method of dyeing) and have fringe, which can be fingerwoven into complicated designs. The garment is considered to be part of Mexican identity. It has been prominently worn by women such as Frida Kahlo, actress María Félix and former Mexican first lady Margarita Zavala and still popular in rural areas of the country. However, its use has diminished in urban areas.

== Description and use of garment ==
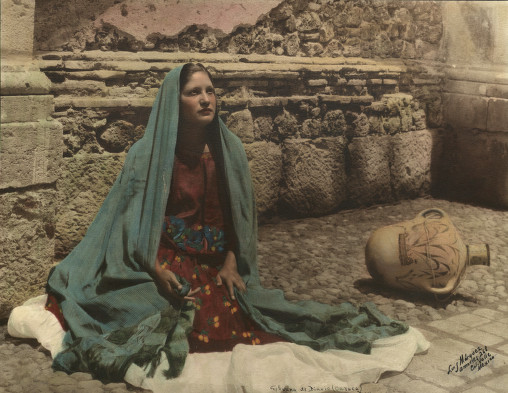
Hand-colored photography by Luis Marquez (photographer), 1937 Mexico.

A rebozo is a long straight piece of cloth which looks like a cross between a scarf and a shawl. Like ponchos, huipils and sarapes they are classic Mexican garments made of straight, mostly uncut cloth, but rebozos have their own characteristics. It is classically a woman's garment, traditionally hand woven, distinguished by complicated fingerwoven fringes called rapacejos. The wearing of the rebozo is said to make the movement of a woman more graceful. The wearing of a rebozo by many women is a sign of Mexican heritage, and for that reason, sales of the garment can double before Mexican Independence Day on September 16. Because of the nature of the garment, especially the fringes, they should be hand washed. The dye may or may not be colorfast so mild soap should be used.

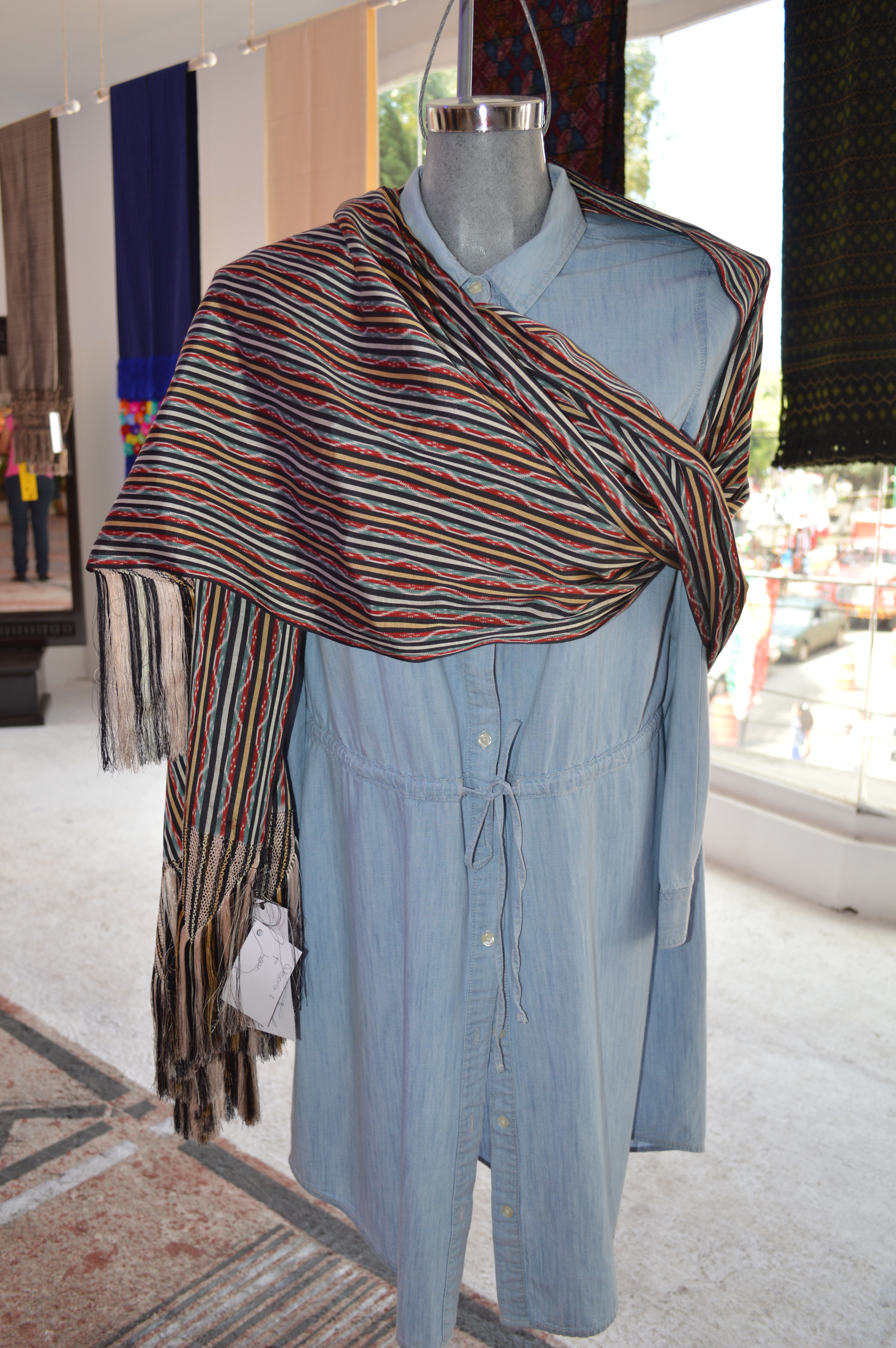
Silk rebozo from Santa María del Río, SLP on a mannequin at the Feria de Rebozo in Tenancingo, State of Mexico

While all rebozos are rectangular woven cloth with fringes, there is significant variation within these constraints. There are three classes of rebozos. Traditional ones have a design created with the ikat dyeing technique and come in various set patterns. Regional rebozos are more colorful and their origins can be identified, especially those from Oaxaca, Chiapas and Guerrero. Contemporary rebozos experiment with non-traditional fibres and designs. Sizes vary with lengths anywhere from 1.5 to about 3.5 meters long. Most Mexican rebozos are made from cotton, wool, silk or rayon. The type of fibre used is the main factor in determining a price of a piece which can vary from a couple hundred pesos to thousands of pesos, with fine pure silk pieces being the most expensive. The finest silk rebozos can be passed through a wedding ring.

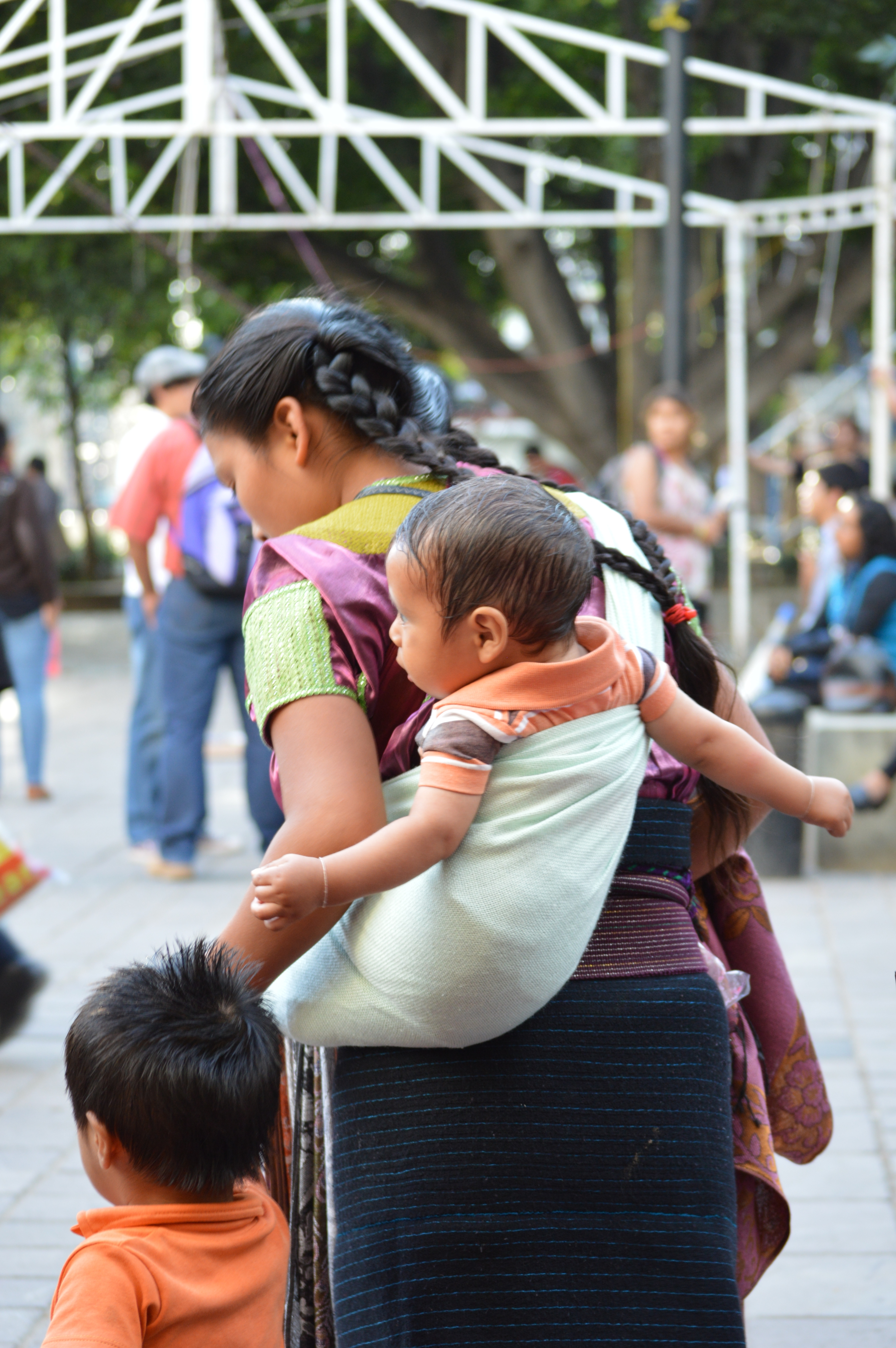
Young street vendor carrying baby in a rebozo in the city of Oaxaca

Rebozo colors and patterns vary widely and traditional designs can usually identify where it was made. For example, a tightly woven black and indigo version is identified with the mountain areas of the state of Michoacán. Designs are generally classified as "classic" and "indigenous." Classic rebozos come in various colors with designs based on the prehispanic art of plumaría, or creating images with feathers. Some of these have their fringes knotted to form images of animals and stares. However, almost all are created with the ikat technique. The most famous classic rebozo style is called "de bolitas" whose name comes from little knots of string tied onto groups of threads used in its production. Among indigenous groups designs and colors almost always indicate with group the woman belongs. While most rebozos use more than one color, monochrome versions are called "chalinas."

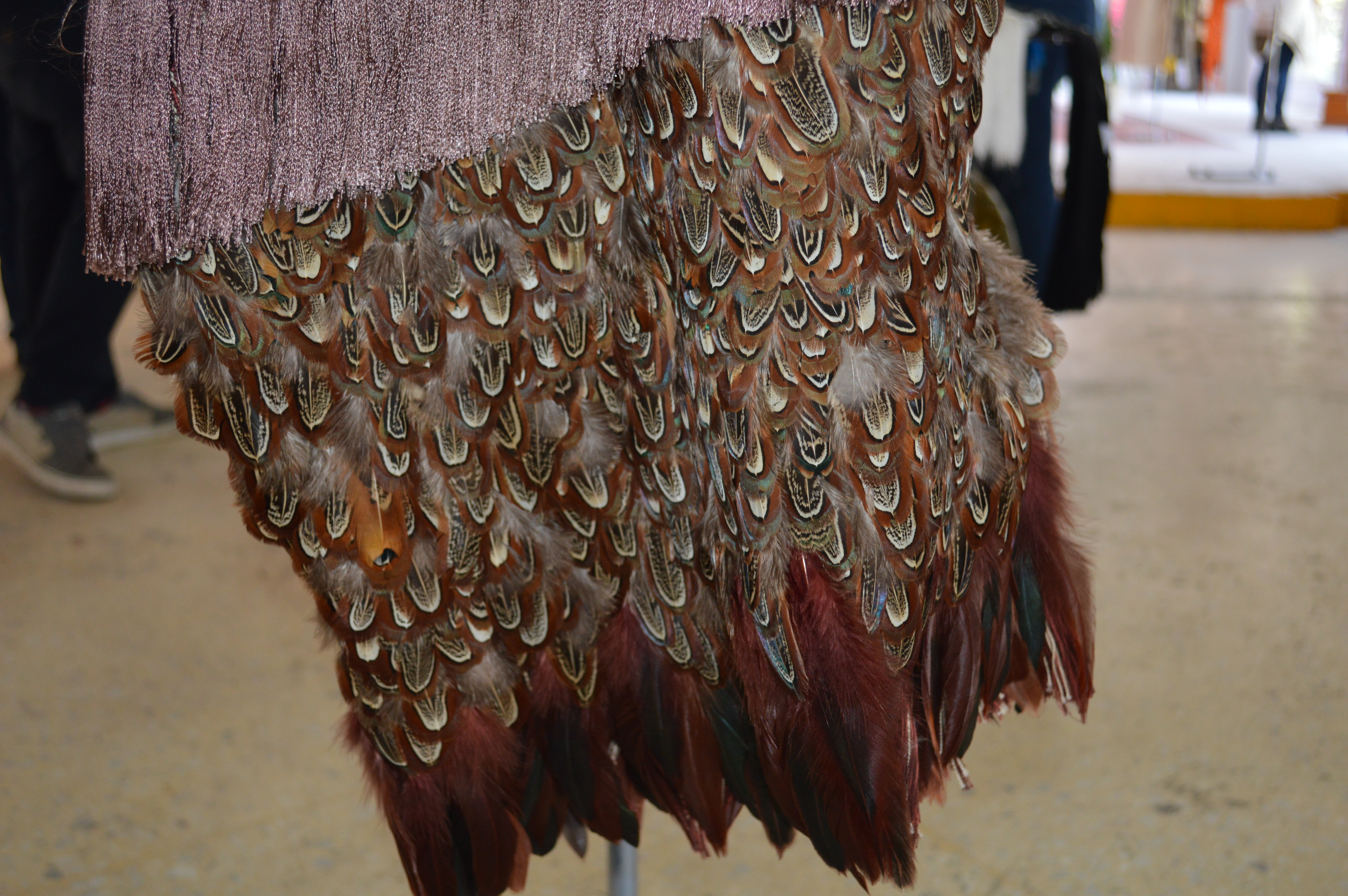
Fringe of a rebozo from Michoacán, with roadrunner feathers

Rebozos have two main functions, that of a garment and that as a carrying aid. As a garment, it can be an indispensable part of the wardrobe of many mestizo and indigenous women, especially those who live in rural areas. As a shawl, it can provide warmth (especially the thicker and wool ones), worn on the head to block the sun as well as for modesty, especially in church. For city and upper-class women who use them, they can be worn inside the home but are most often used as an accessory to an outfit, especially on certain occasions. As a carrying aid, it can be tied around the head or shoulders most often to carry small children and large bundles, mostly commonly among indigenous women. The rebozo has even figured into Mexican traditional medicine. It has been used as a tourniquet, as support for a woman in later pregnancy, as an aid to a woman in labor, supporting her allowing for rhythmic movements and positioning with aim of making childbirth easier. It can also be used to alleviate headaches by tying it tightly around the head. Other uses for the rebozo have been in indigenous traditional dances and even as a shroud. One modern and innovative way to wear it has been to twist it around the upper body and fastened to make a kind of blouse or top.

== History ==
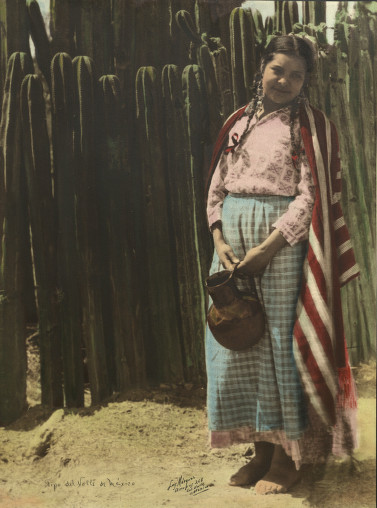
Hand-colored photography by Luis Marquez (photographer), 1937. Mexico

The name comes from Spanish, from the verb that means to cover or envelope oneself. However, there have been indigenous names for it as well, such as "ciua nequealtlapacholoni" in colonial-era Nahuatl, which means "that which touches a woman or something like her;" "mini-mahua" among the Otomi; and, in the Nahuatl of Hueyapan, Morelos, "cenzotl," from a phrase that means "cloth of a thousand colors."

The origin of the rebozo is not known, but the garment probably had its beginnings in the very early colonial period. The first mention and description of the garment in written records was in 1572 by Friar Diego Duran, according to research done by Ruth D. Lechuga. The rebozo itself shows various influences, which probably come from the various cultures that had contact at that time.

There are various indigenous garments that share physical characteristics with the rebozo. They include the ayate, a rough cloth of maguey fibre used to carry cargo; the mamatl, which is a cotton cloth also used to carry objects and which often had a decorative border; and the tilma (used for carrying and as a garment), a cloth best known from the one Juan Diego wore and which bears the image of Our Lady of Guadalupe. There are chronicles that say that la Malinche carried a cloth called a "Manta del sol" or "Sun Cloth", which was not just used to protect from the sun but also to denote status as decoration. However, prehispanic clothing and other cloths did not have woven fringes. The main European influence is most likely the Spanish mantilla, although a southern Spanish garment called a rebociño (introduced to the area by the Moors) may have also played a part. Later influences came from the Filipino alampay (Spanish pañuelo) at the start of trade from the Manila galleons. The 19th century mantón de Manila, also based on the alampay, was also influential in the development of the characteristic fringes.

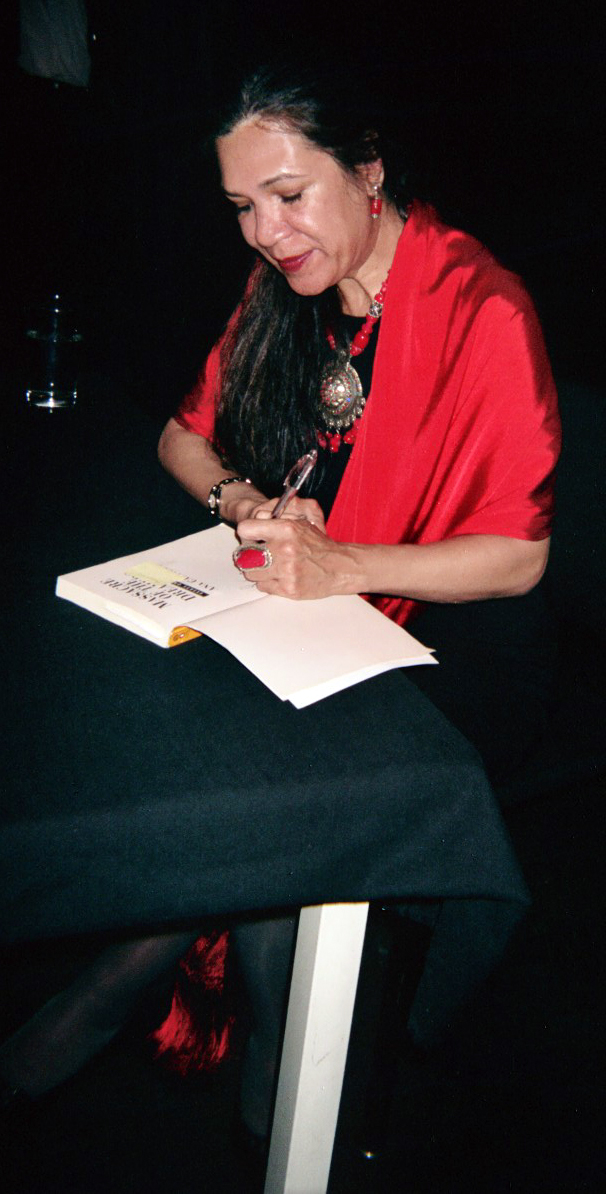
Writer Ana Castillo in a rebozo

The rebozo's origin was most likely among the lower, mestizo classes in the early colonial period, being most prominent among them first. The most traditional rebozos show coloring and designs from the colonial period, and mestizo women, unable to afford Spanish finery, probably wore them to distinguish themselves from indigenous women. In 1625, Thomas Gage noted that blacks and mixed race people in Mexico wore wide strips of clothes on their head instead of the Spanish mantilla. In the colonial period how it was worn distinguished married women from single. Married women wore it loose covering the top of the head down over the back. Single women would wrap it tighter, allowing more of the back to be seen. These garments were initially made of cotton but, by later in the colonial period, they were also made of wool and silk. Their use eventually spread into indigenous communities, among which they became an integral part of many women's attire and culture. For example, an Otomi woman used to dip a point of her rebozo into water to indicate that she was thinking of her betrothed or husband. One important use for the garment in colonial times to the 19th century was for women to cover their heads in church. After its initial development in Mexico, the rebozo spread south into Central America, and even as far as Ecuador.

The rebozo was in common use among the middle and lower classes by the 18th century, with the kind of fibre used to weave it distinguishing the two. The garment was in common use among women by the 18th century. At that time the Count of Revillagigedo noted that it was worn by all women, except nuns and those of the uppermost classes. The two most common fibres were cotton and the more expensive cotton/silk or silk. Sizes and designs varied, but those made with the ikat dyeing technique became dominant. In some parts of Mexico, a woman was given a rebozo by a man instead of a ring as a way to propose marriage. The finest rebozos included ornate embroidery including silver and gold thread. One fashion of that century was to embroider country scenes.

In 1886, a synthetic silk called rayon was created in France. The use of this cheaper thread made decorative rebozos more affordable. The rebozo's use as an identifying marker of Mexican identity began at this time as well, with even the Empress Carlota wearing it on various formal occasions, especially while at her country home in Cuernavaca. By the end of the 19th century, the garment had become indispensable and its making an important handcraft.

Its symbolic function continued into the Mexican Revolution, during which it was associated with rebel women called "Adelitas," who wrapped both babies and weapons inside rebozos as they passed federal checkpoints. During this time, the rebozo was also often used as a shroud for the dead. Much of the world's familiarity with the rebozo comes from later cinematic depictions of Adelitas, but it also accentuated the garment's use with indigenous women, poverty and low socioeconomic station.

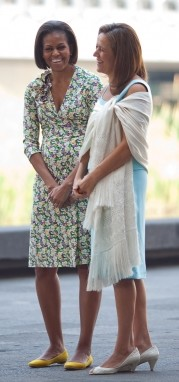
First Lady Margarita Zavala with First Lady of the United States Michelle Obama, April 2010.

Today, the rebozo can be found in all parts of Mexico, and just about all women in the country own at least one, regardless of socioeconomic class. In many villages, women are still dressed as infants in them, grow up with them, get married with them, and are buried in them. The rebozo is still commonly worn in church by rural women. During the 20th century, the rebozo came to be seen as a sign both of modesty/tradition and of revolution, including in some communities in the United States. For women of the Chicano movement, it represented the "complete woman" as both feminine and strong, ready to fight for "the Cause." Prominent people who have prominently worn rebozos include María Félix, Frida Kahlo, Lila Downs and model Luly Jáuregui, as well as former Mexican First Lady Margarita Zavala, who was noted for wearing the garment at state functions. The rebozo has appeared in popular culture and media as well as literature. During the Golden Age of Mexican cinema the garment appeared in many movies, including one named El Rebozo de Soledad (Soledad's Rebozo). A de bolita patterned rebozo is mentioned in one of Francisco Gabilondo Soler’s famous children's songs. The character of la India María, played by renowned female comedian María Elena Velasco, is very much characterized by her rebozo.

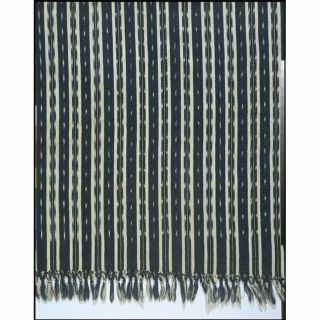
Rebozo, 1875-1890, V&A Museum no. T.21-1931

However, despite its status as a national symbol, the rebozo's use has diminished, especially those in cities. One reason for this is that the garment is associated with indigenous groups and poverty, and another is that the fine handwoven rebozos, especially of silk, are very expensive because of the skilled labor required. Many of the most expensive rebozos are no longer made in many parts of the country, with the exceptions of Santa María del Río and San Luis Potosí City. The number of weavers of all types of rebozos has diminished. For example, there are only fifty in the entire state of Jalisco, almost all concentrated in a few municipalities, such as Sayula and Tuxpan.

Efforts have been made to preserve and promote the use of the rebozo in various ways. In 1953, the Escuela de Rebozo (Rebozo School) was established to teach the weaving techniques used. In 2002 the school won the Premio Nacional de Artes y Tradiciones Populares. Other institutions dedicated to the craft are Museo de Rebozo in la Piedad, Michoacan, the Tejedoras de la Tercera Edad, run by the Secretariat of Culture in Acatlán, Veracruz and the Taller de Rebocería in the Casa de la Cultura in Tenancingo, State of Mexico. Since the 1940s, various techniques have been used to modernize the design of the garment, including the use of sequins. Some modern Mexican fashion designers like Lydia Lavín and Monserrat Messeguer have designed modern versions of the garment, using new fabrics and international patterns, such as those from the Oriente and Africa.

Rebozos have been the center of museum, cultural and fashion events in Mexico. Various fairs and festivals dedicated to the garment are held in places such as Matamoros, Tamaulipas, Jiquilpan, Tenancingo, and Zapopan. The first Concurso Nacional del Rebozo (National Rebozo Contest) was held in San Luis Potosí in 2004. The Universidad del Valle de Atemajac, Campus La Piedad created a video called "El Arte del Rebozo" to promote the garment both online and at international events. The university held a conference with the same name in 2012. For the 100th anniversary celebrations of the Mexican Revolution in Coyoacán, Mexico City, the rebozo was featured prominently. The Museo Nacional de Culturas Populares in Mexico City held an event called "Tápame con tu rebozo" in 2012, to promote the use and sale of the garment. Exhibitions of rebozos have also been held in the Southwestern United States, with the first Festival del Rebozo in the country held in New Mexico, exhibitions at the University of Texas at Brownsville at the Austrey Museum in Los Angeles, and an annual Day of the Rebozo Festival in Fresno, California. There is also a museum dedicated to the garment, La Casa del Rebozo, in Guadalajara. In addition to a collection of rebozos in many sizes, colors and textures, La Casa del Rebozo offers conferences, classes, workshops and fashion shows to promote the garment.

== Production ==
Woman weaving a silk rebozo on a backstrap loom at the Taller Escuela de Rebocería in Santa Maria del Rio, San Luis Potosí

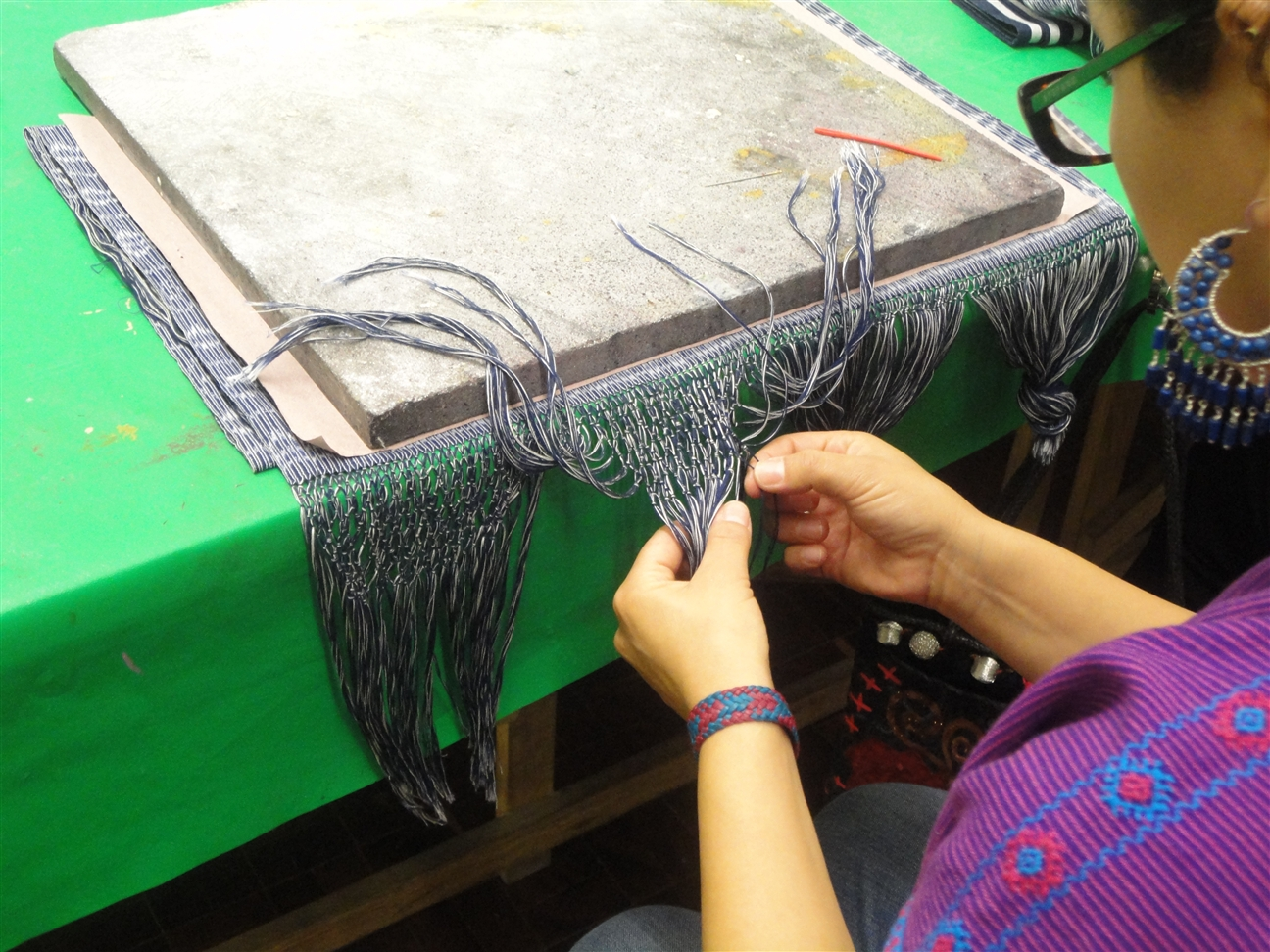
Finishing off a rebozo at a textile workshop at the Museo de Arte Popular, Mexico City.

Mexico is the main producer and exporter of rebozos, but some are also produced in Spain and Portugal. Average time to make a traditionally woven rebozo is thirty to sixty days with anywhere fifteen to 200 different steps depending on how complicated the design is and the type of fibre being used. For example, rebozos made of real silk take longer to weave. Those made of rayon have about 3,000 warp threads on average and those made of real silk have about 3,800.

The dyeing process is done before weaving, with the most common technique being the ikat method, sometimes called "amarrado" (lit. stingy) In the most traditional work, thread is dyed with natural colors, with colors such as black, blue, red, purple and green but synthetic dyes are now often used. The patterns of the garment are determined by a sequence of colors dyed into the thread, with color changes made similar to tie-dyeing. Groups of threads are tied together tightly at intervals so that the dye cannot enter some areas. After dyeing, the knots are cut off. The weaving begins by cutting the warp threads to the length of the final product. The number of threads determines the width. They are woven on both backstrap looms and European style looms. The groups of warp threads are then placed on the loom in order to work out the design that the body of the cloth will have. After weaving, the last rows of the weft are finger weaved to secure them, which is complicated and meticulous work, often done by women specialized in this. Isabel Rivera and Julia Sánches of Santa María have won national and international awards for their work, with the ability to weave letters into the fringes of rebozos. In some areas, after they are finished, rebozos are "smoked" with rosemary branches or are stored with apples or quince in order to make them smell good.

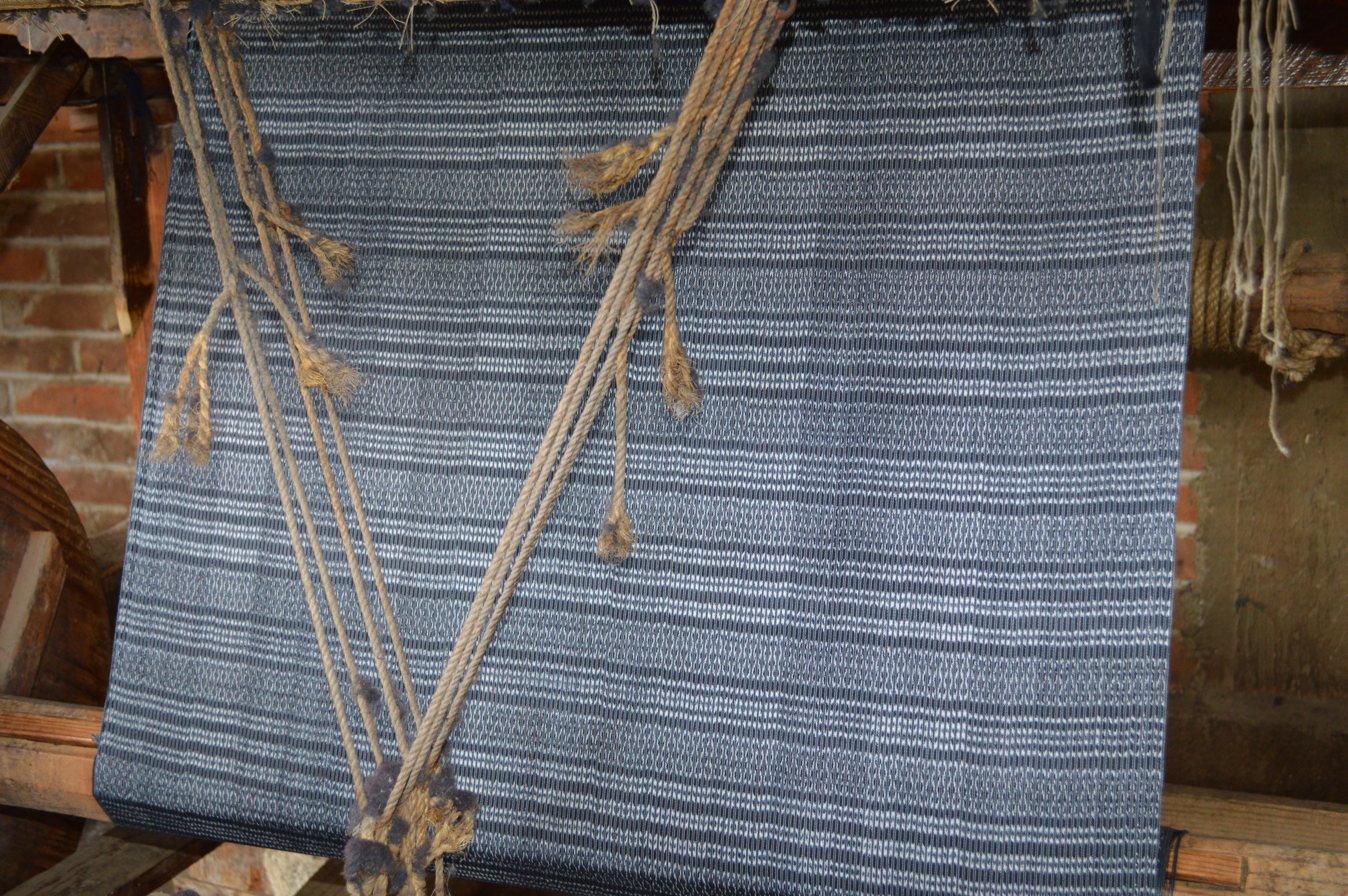
Labor doble design ikat rebozo on a loom at the Inocencio Borboa workshop in Tenancingo

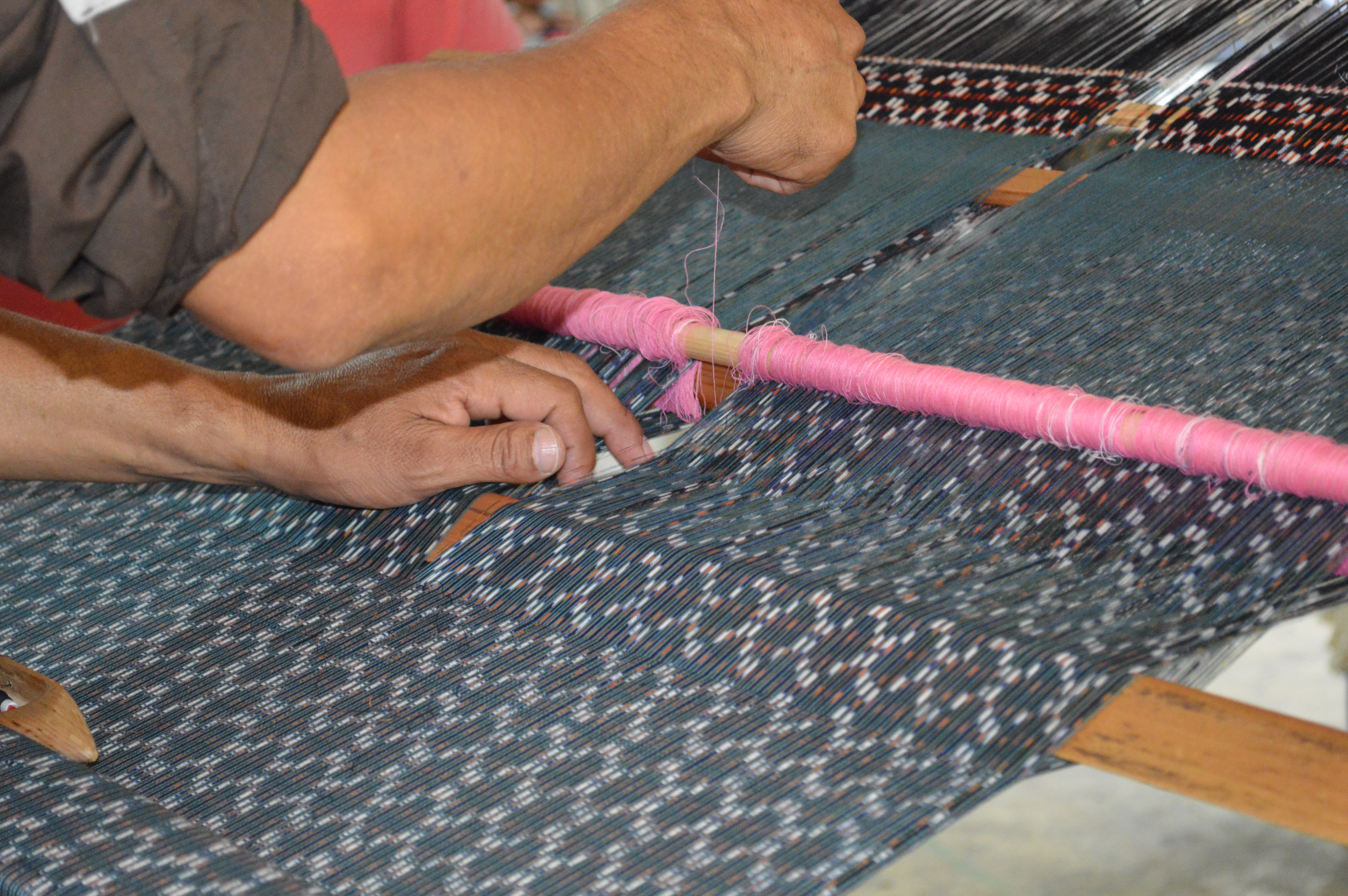
Ikat rebozo being made on a backstrap loom at the Feria de Rebozo in Tenancingo

There are a number of locations in Mexico which produce traditional rebozos including, Zamora, Ahuirán, Turícuaro, Angahuan, Santa Cruz, Tocuaro, Zitácuaro, Cuanajo, Arocutín and Tangancícuaro in Michoacán, Moroleón and Uriangato in Guanajuato, the Altos de Chiapas region, Xochistlahuaca in Guerrero, the Sierra Norte de Puebla, San Pedro Cajonos, Pinotepa de Don Luis, Yalalag, and Santa María Tlahuitoltepec in Oaxaca as well as the Cooperativa Textil Artesanal in the city of Oaxaca and Chiautempan, Tlaxcala, However, there are several important locations whose work are featured in important collections such as that of the Rockefeller family. These include Santa María del Río, Tenancingo and La Piedad.

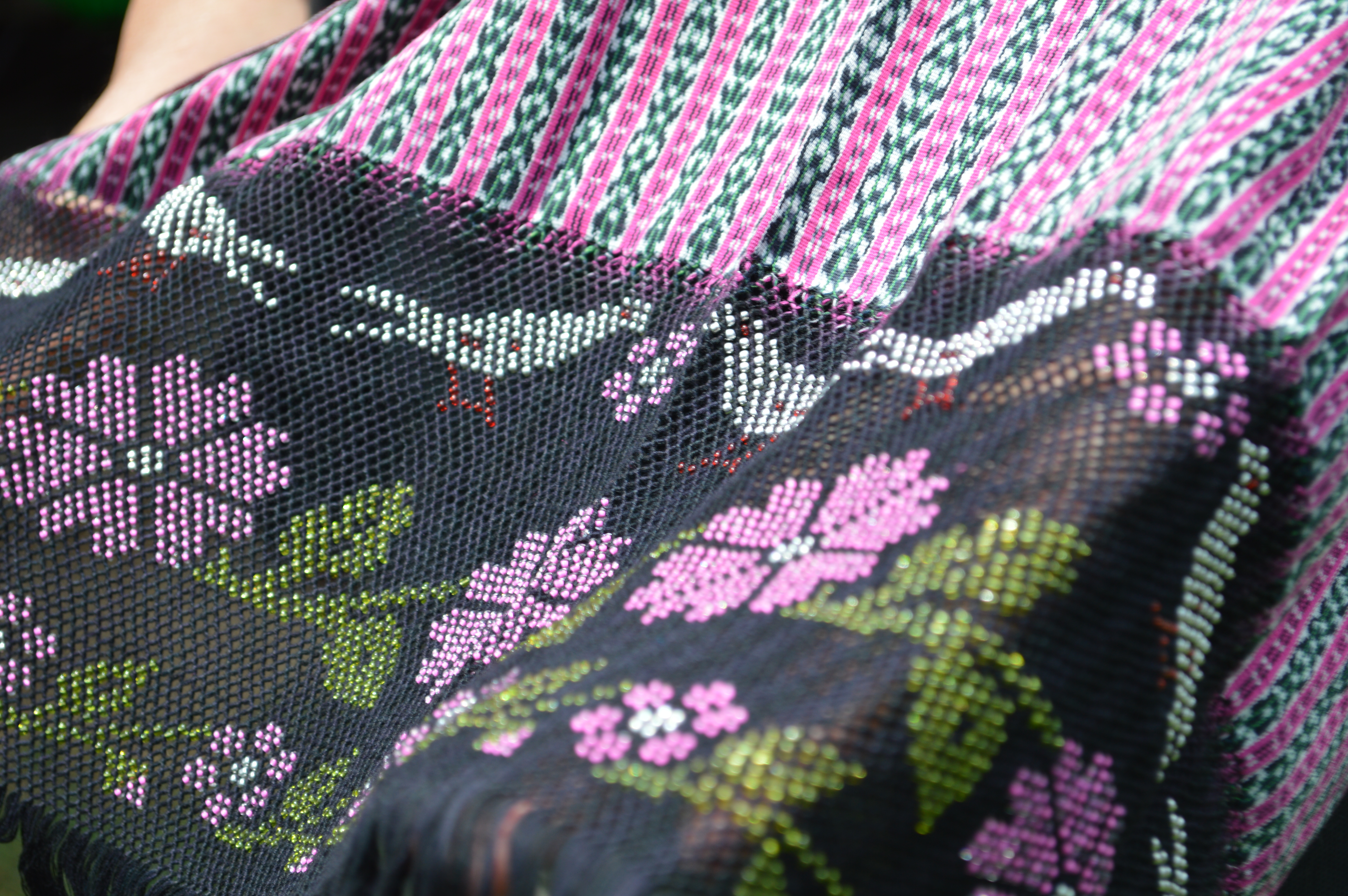
Rebozo fringe intricately fingerwoven with small beads

Santa María del Río is a small rural town in the state of San Luis Potosí, containing country homes for the well-to-do in the city of San Luis Potosí. The entrance arch of the town states "Santa María del Río, cuna del rebozo" (Santa María del Río, cradle of the rebozo). Even the local baseball team is named after rebozo weavers, called the "Reboceros." It is known for its production of finely woven rebozos especially in silk and rayon, with cotton ones made as well. Weaving was introduced to the area shortly after the conquest and gained fame by the 17th century. Silk production was introduced originally in Oaxaca by the Dominicans. Despite prohibitions, Junípero Serra introduced their cultivation into the region in the 18th century, with silk production and weaving becoming widespread by the late 19th century into the 20th. The variety of silk traditionally used in these rebozos is called "catiteo." After the Mexican Revolution, the haciendas producing silk were broken up and many weavers turned to rayon and very few are still made with pure silk. Their production is done by families, but only by the women, with a number winning national awards for their work. In Santa María the use of various browns is a distinguishing characteristic of the region. Other common colors are black, blue, red, purple and green along occasional white threads which appear as flecks in the final product. There are a number of traditional color combinations and designs with names such as calabrote, Rosita, rosarito, culebrilla calado and more. Santa Maria hosts a Feria del Rebozo in August and is home to the Escuela de Rebozo (Rebozo School) and a cooperative called the Taller Escuela de Rebocería.

The making of cotton rebozos is important in Tenancingo and an image of the garment appears in the municipality's seal. Tenancingo's rebozos come in a wide variety of prices from 400 to 4,000 pesos, depending on the quality of the cotton, the complexity of the design and the thread count. The craft was developed in Tenancingo by the 17th century and reached its peak during the 19th century. The creation of the garment remains important both culturally and economically, with the work here recognized at the national and international levels. One of the town's most important weavers is Evaristo Borboa.

The mountain areas of Michoacán have been noted for an indigo blue variety of rebozo, known as the Michoacán or Tarasco rebozo. In the 1930s and 1940s, the city of La Piedad, Michoacán became a major producer of rebozos of both natural and synthetic fibres. In 1946 the Unión de Reboceros de La Piedad was formed and in 1958, the Sindicato Único de Reboceros de La Piedad.

== See also ==
- Aguayo, a similar piece of cloth used in the Andes
- Dupatta, a similar piece of cloth used in South Asia
- Pañuelo, a similar traditional clothing from the Philippines
- Manila shawl, a 19th century shawl derived from the Philippine pañuelo
- Mantilla, a similar-looking women's Spanish head-dress made of cloth, similar to a veil. Maybe a case of exchange or convergence
