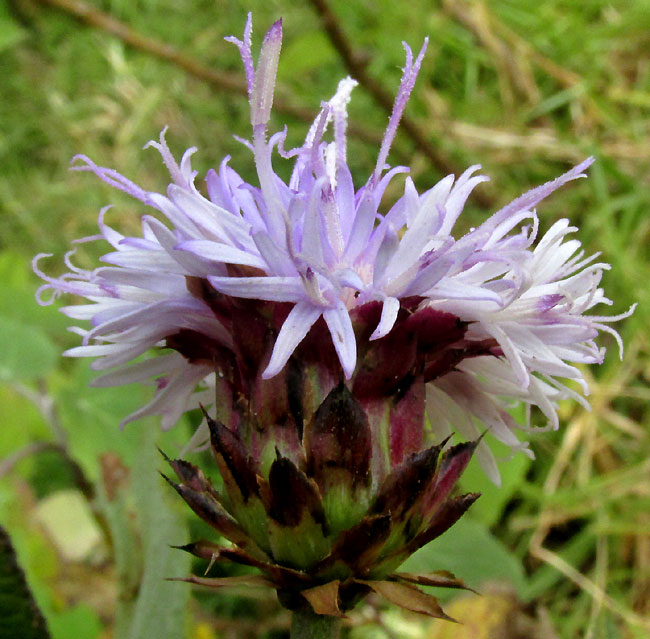
- floral head with spine-tipped involucral bracts

Scientific classification
- Kingdom: Plantae
- Clade: Embryophytes
- Clade: Tracheophytes
- Clade: Spermatophytes
- Clade: Angiosperms
- Clade: Eudicots
- Clade: Asterids
- Order: Asterales
- Family: Asteraceae
- Genus: Vickianthus
- Species: V. alamanii

Binomial name
- Vickianthus alamanii (DC.) H.Rob.

Synonyms
- Cacalia alamanii (DC.) Kuntze; Vernonia alamanii DC.; Eupatorium atropurpureum Sessé & Moc.; Vernonia alamanii var. dictyophlebia (Gleason) McVaugh; Vernonia dictyophlebia Gleason

= Vickianthus alamanii =

Species of plant

Vickianthus alamanii, with no common name, is a species of shrub or subshrub native only to Mexico. It belongs to the family Asteraceae.

== Description ==
These are some of the most noteworthy features of Vickianthus alamanii:

- Stems bearing simple hairs, or trichomes, are partly woody at the base and stand up to 4 m (13 ft) tall.
- Leaves with short petioles arise individually along stems. Their blades are widest below their middles, gradually taper toward sharp tips, and are variously hairy with few to many dot-like glands; upper surfaces are rough to the touch. Blades at the base are up to 18 cm (7 in) long and 12 cm (4 1/2 in) wide, diminishing in size upward. Blade margins are saw-toothed to almost toothless.
- Inflorescences with long peduncles are branched, broad and somewhat flat-topped or slightly rounded, with lower flower stalks longer than upper ones.
- Broadly bell-shaped floral heads consist of up to 80 "disc florets" with cylindrical, reddish to violet corollas up to 20 mm (3/4 in) long, with the lobes up to about 7 mm (1/4 in) long. There are no flat, petal-like "ray florets." Below the florets, up to 80 involucral bracts are papery to membraneous, arranged in 5 or 6 series, often purplish, with the outer ones curving downwards, and with spiny tips up to 3.5 mm (1/8 in) long. The bracts form an involucre up to 24 mm (1 in) tall.
- One-seeded, cypsela-type fruits are slender, 8-10 ribbed, and usually bear a dense cover of dot-like glands. Pappuses consist of around 30 bristles up to 11 mm (3/8 in) long.

== Distribution ==
Vickianthus alamanii is endemic only to the central and southern Mexican states of Campeche, Colima, Guanajuato, Guerrero, Hidalgo, Jalisco, México, Michoacán, Morelia, Oaxaca, Puebla, Querétaro, San Luis Potosí, Tamaulipas and Veracruz.

== Habitat ==
In upland central Mexico Vickianthus alamanii mainly occurs in secondary vegetation derived from forests of oak and pine, tropical forests with deciduous leaves, and mesophytic mountain forests at elevations of 1,100–2,600 m (3,600–8,500 ft).

== As a pollinator-friendly plant ==
Along the banks of Mexico's Lake Pátzcuaro where beekeeping is economically important, Vickianthus alamanii is considered significant for maintaining the bee populations.

== Taxonomy ==
In 1836 Augustin Pyramus de Candolle formally named and described Vickianthus alamanii under the name Vernonia alamanii, remarking that he had only a fragment to work with, but that it was very distinctive. The fragment had been sent to him by "Alaman." This was certainly Lucas Alamán, known to have sent to de candolle many collections mostly encountered in Alamán's native state of Guanajuato.

In 2023 when the genus Vickianthus was erected by Harold E. Robinson, Vickianthus alamanii was chosen as the type species for the genus.

=== Etymology ===
The genus name Vickianthus honors botanist Vicki Funk.

The species name alamanii honors Lucas Alamán, who sent Augustin Pyramus de Candolle a fragment of the plant, from which the taxon first was formally described, as Vernonia alamanii.

== Gallery ==
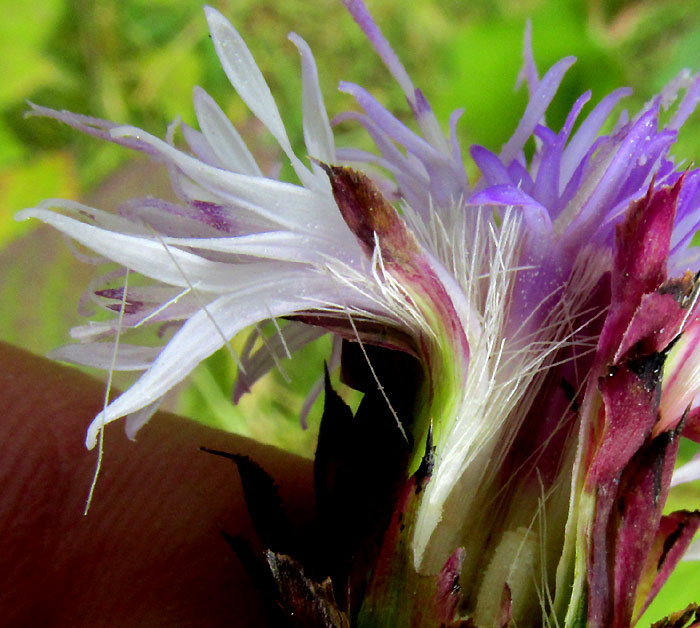
Dissected floral head

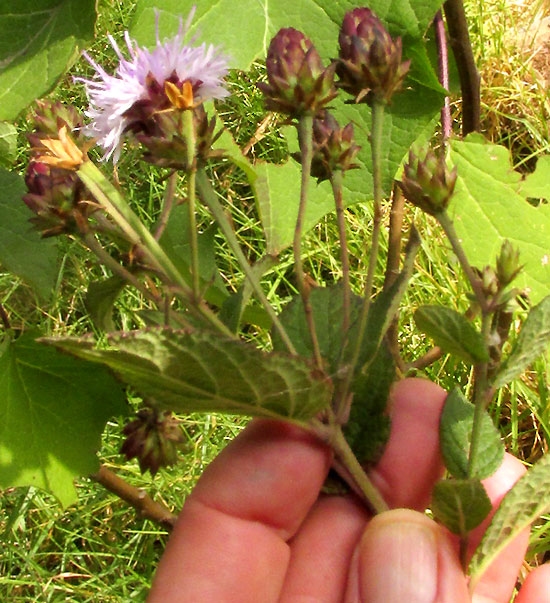
Inflorescence

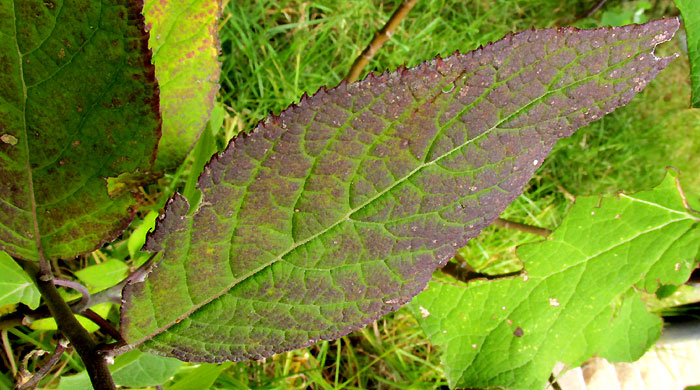
Leaf

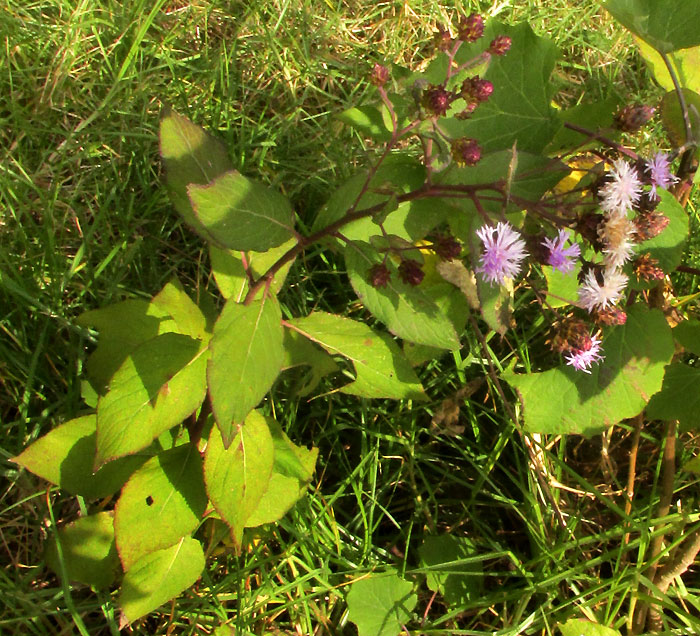
In weedy habitat
