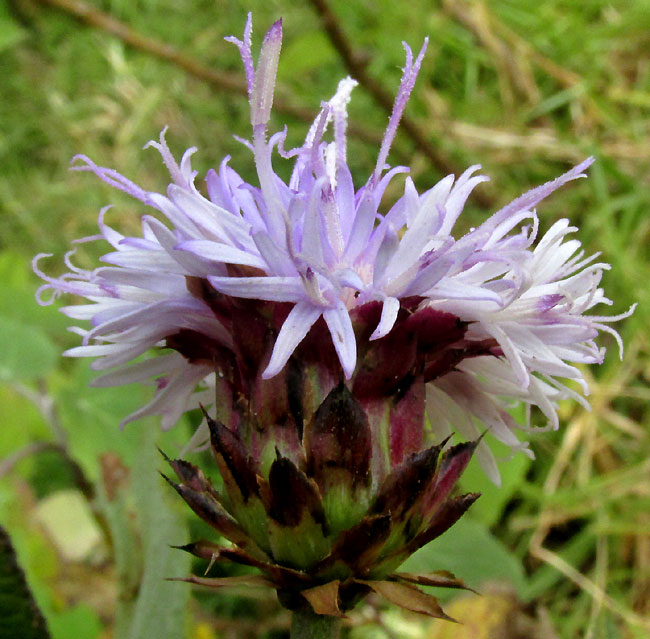
- Vickianthus alamanii floral head

Scientific classification
- Kingdom: Plantae
- Clade: Embryophytes
- Clade: Tracheophytes
- Clade: Spermatophytes
- Clade: Angiosperms
- Clade: Eudicots
- Clade: Asterids
- Order: Asterales
- Family: Asteraceae
- Subfamily: Vernonioideae
- Tribe: Vernonieae
- Genus: Vickianthus; H.Rob.

= Vickianthus =

Genus of flowering plants

Vickianthus is a genus of flowering plants in the family Asteraceae. It includes ten species native to Mexico.

The species now included in Vickianthus were formerly placed in the genera Vernonia and Vernonanthura. In 2023 Harold E. Robinson et al. organized them into a new genus based in a comprehensive phylogenetic study of the tribe Vernonieae. The genus is named after the botanist, curator, and plant collector Vicki Funk (1947–2019).

== Species ==
Ten species are accepted.

- Vickianthus alamanii (DC.) H.Rob.
- Vickianthus bealliae (McVaugh) H.Rob.
- Vickianthus cronquistii (S.B.Jones) H.Rob.
- Vickianthus hintoniorum (B.L.Turner) H.Rob.
- Vickianthus inuloides (DC.) H.Rob.
- Vickianthus karvinskianus (DC.) H.Rob.
- Vickianthus liatroides (DC.) H.Rob.
- Vickianthus oaxacanus (Sch.Bip. ex Klatt) H.Rob.
- Vickianthus serratuloides (Kunth) H.Rob.
- Vickianthus vernonioides (A.Gray) H.Rob.
