= Janitzio =

Coordinates: 19°34′25″N 101°39′7″W

- Island
- Isla de Janitzio
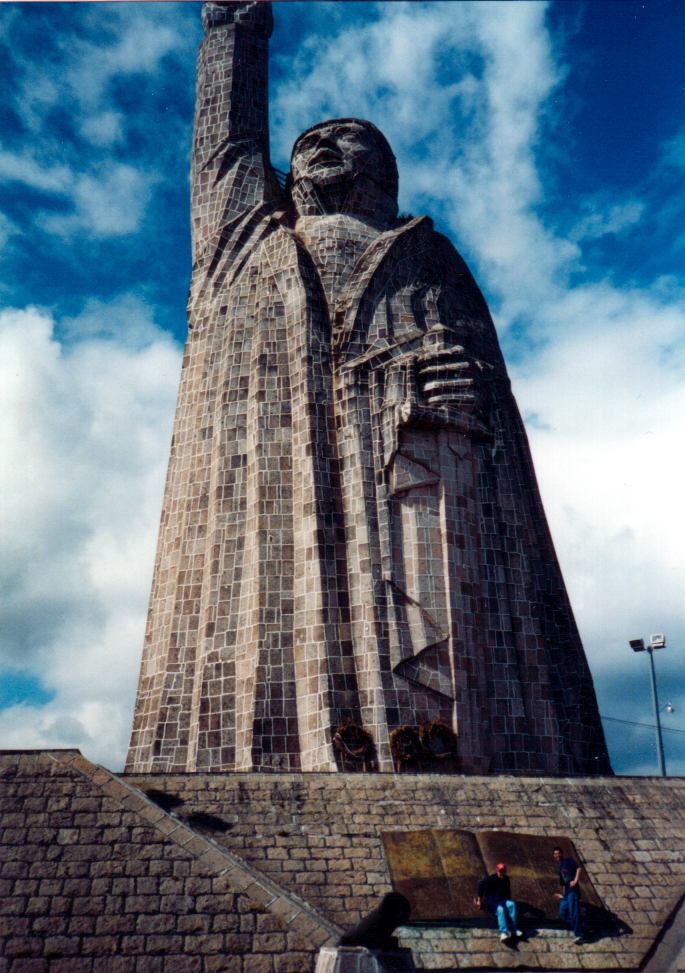
- Statue of José María Morelos at Janitzio
- Interactive map of Janitzio
- Location in Mexico
- Country: Mexico
- State: Michoacán

Population (2020)
  - Total: 2,352
- Time zone: UTC-6 (CST)

Isla de Janitzio (Spanish pronunciation: [xaˈnitsjo]) is the largest of five islands in Lake Pátzcuaro in the state of Michoacán, Mexico.

The town of Janitzio, which means "maize flower" in Purépecha, is located atop a hill on the island. Janitzio can only be reached by boats which run regularly back and forth from about 7:30 am to 6 pm, accessible from Pátzcuaro's pier (embarcadero). The boats take approximately 25 minutes to reach the island. These boats can be hired to take visitors around other parts of the lake.

The town is known for the butterfly fishermen who are skilled at lowering their butterfly-shaped nets to catch "pescado blanco" (Chirostoma estor), a species of freshwater silverside endemic to the lake which is important to the local cuisine. These fisherman were at one time depicted on the reverse of the 50 peso banknote. This banknote is now a valuable collector's item.

The island is the subject of Silvestre Revueltas's 1933 composition Janitzio.

== Statue of José Maria Morelos ==
A 40-meter statue of José María Morelos, a great hero of Mexico's independence, started in 1933, is found on the island's highest point. You can see the statue of Morelos from the boat, when arriving. Visitors can climb to the top of the statue by way of a staircase that spirals up the inside. Along the interior walls, the life of Morelos is depicted in murals painted by Ramón Alba de la Canal and other Mexican muralists. At the top, visitors can look through peepholes in the giant raised fist of Morelos, with views of the island, lake and surroundings.

== People ==
Some of the people of Janitzio and the towns surrounding Lake Pátzcuaro are of indigenous descent and are known as Purépecha. Available in Janitzio are regional handicrafts. A variety of handmade textiles and artwork are sold.

Its main festivity is "Día de Muertos" or Day of the Dead. As part of this festivity, candle-lit boat processions make their way to the island and then to Janitzio's Church and graveyard, remaining there for the night for a large festive vigil with much drinking involved.

== Climate ==
Mild, spring-like temperatures prevail most of the year in the North Central Highlands of central Mexico. The highlands have a climate that is described as a "mild, dry climate." The area around Janitzio rarely sees temperatures that go above 27 degrees, even in summer. Daytime temperatures remain fairly consistent year round, however, it can become quite cold at night from November through March. The rainy season runs from May through October, with July and August generally being the wettest months. Quick moving thunderstorms can be expected over the summer months, June to September. The rest of the year remains quite dry.

== Gallery ==
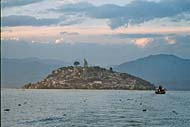

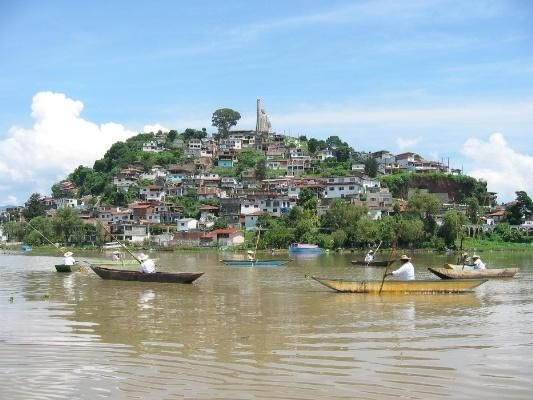

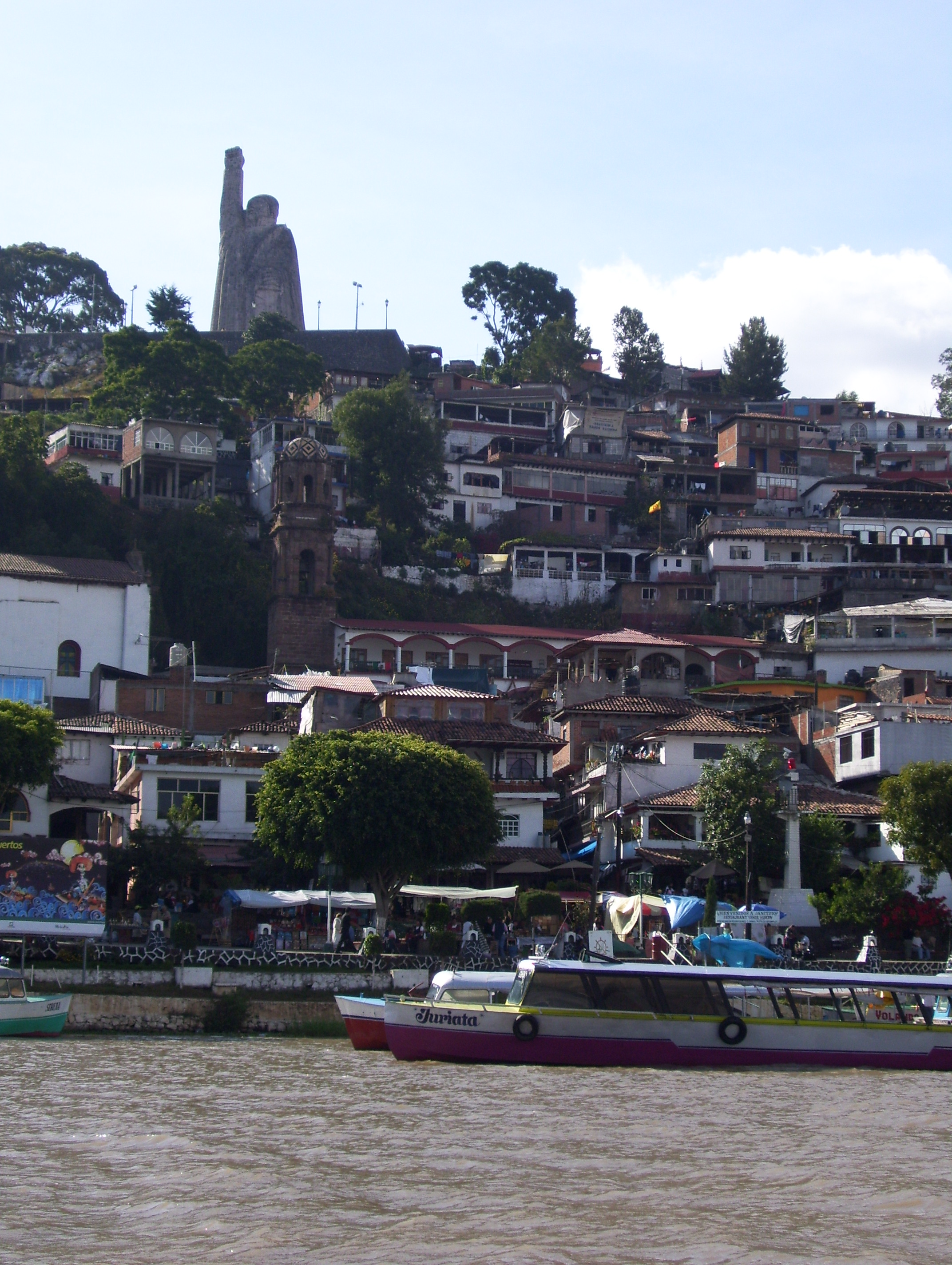

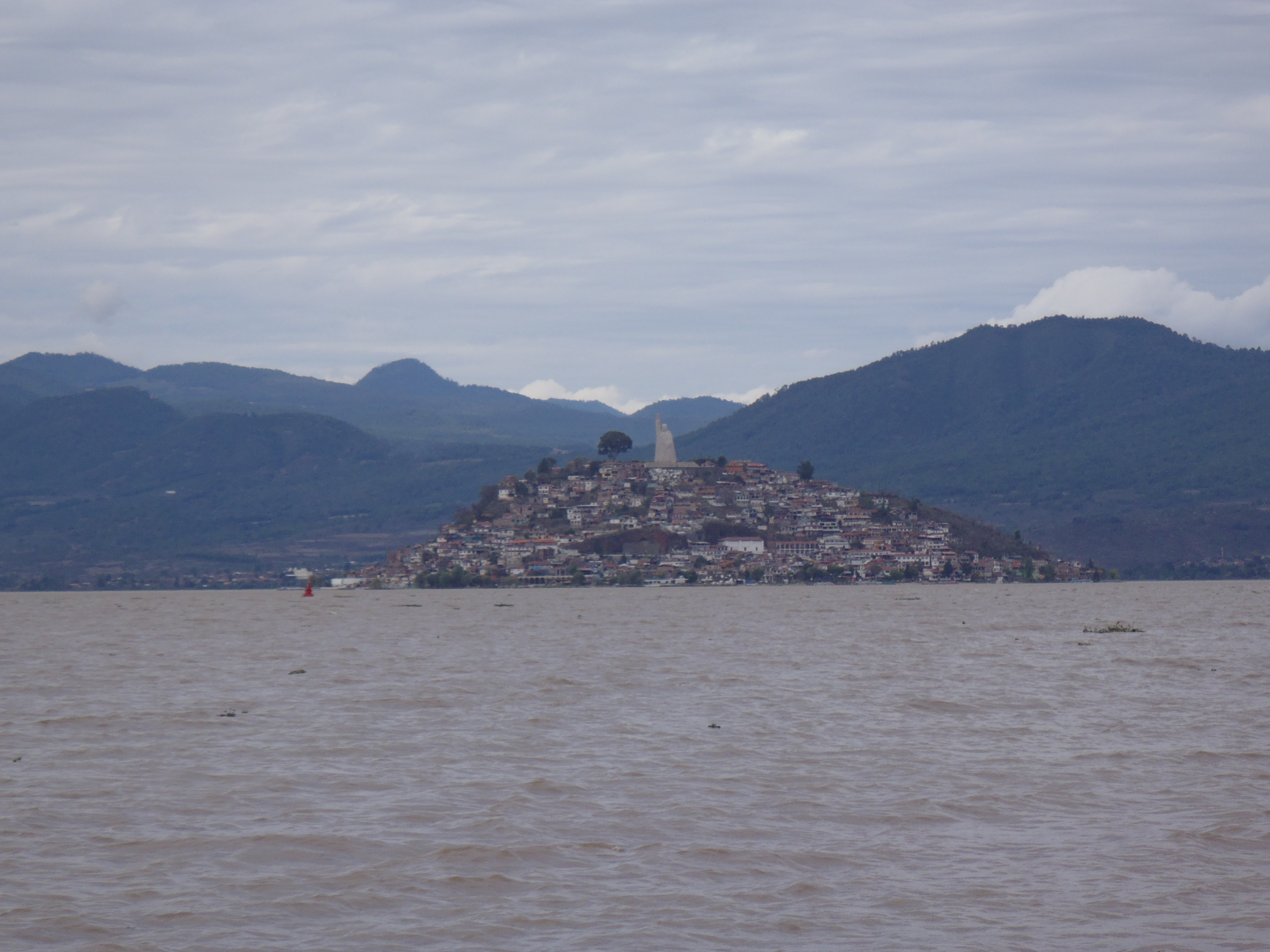
