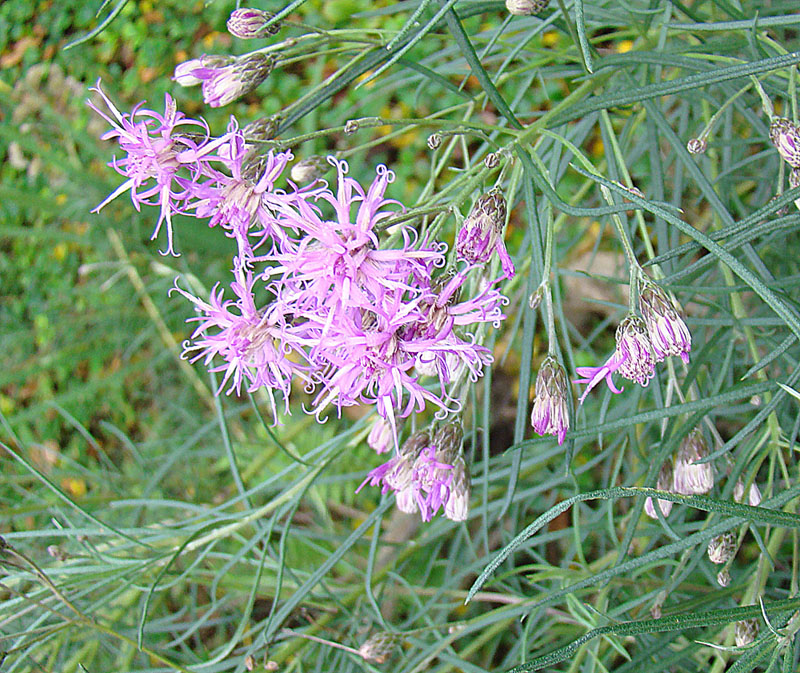

Scientific classification
- Kingdom: Plantae
- Clade: Tracheophytes
- Clade: Angiosperms
- Clade: Eudicots
- Clade: Asterids
- Order: Asterales
- Family: Asteraceae
- Genus: Vernonanthura
- Species: V. nudiflora

Binomial name
- Vernonanthura nudiflora (Less.) H.Rob.

Synonyms
- Cacalia nudiflora (Less.) Kuntze; Vernonia angustifolia D.Don ex Hook. & Arn. (non Vernonia angustifolia Michx.); Vernonia nudiflora Less.

= Vernonanthura nudiflora =

Species of plant

Vernonanthura nudiflora is a species of perennial plant in the family Asteraceae. It is native to Brazil and Argentina.
