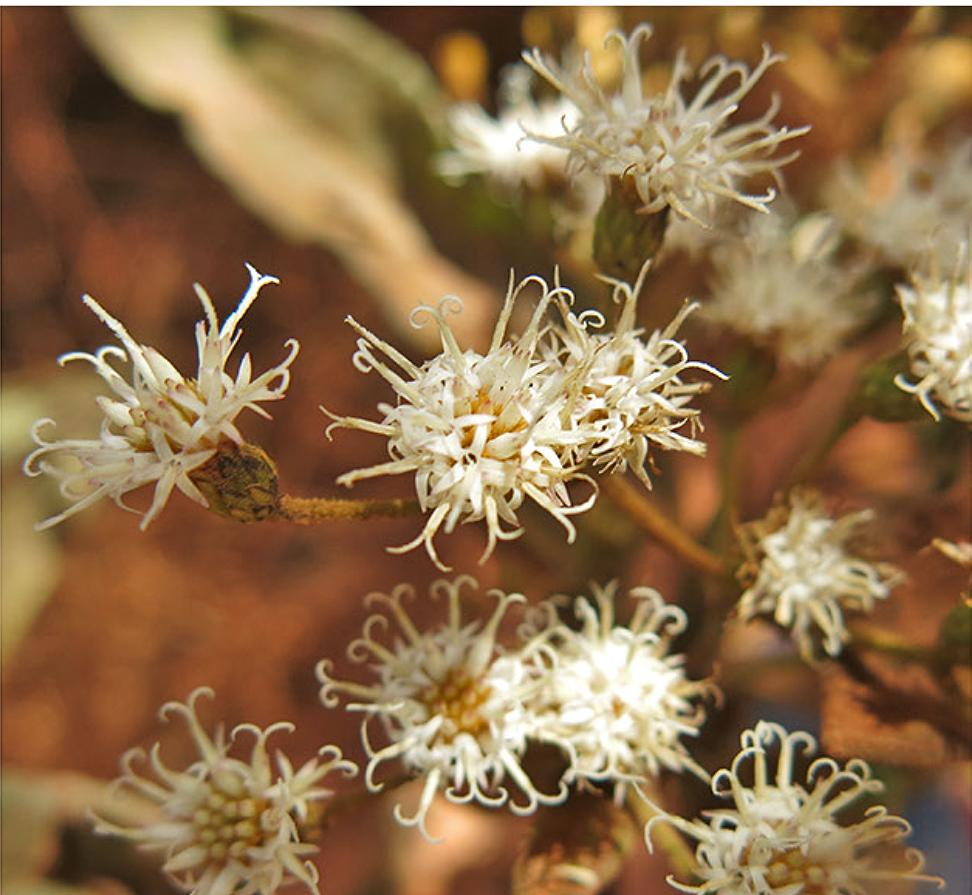

Scientific classification
- Kingdom: Plantae
- Clade: Tracheophytes
- Clade: Angiosperms
- Clade: Eudicots
- Clade: Asterids
- Order: Asterales
- Family: Asteraceae
- Genus: Vernonanthura
- Species: V. polyanthes

Binomial name
- Vernonanthura polyanthes (Spreng.) Vega & M.Dematteis

Synonyms
- Chrysocoma phosphorica Vell.; Eupatorium polyanthes Spreng.; Vernonanthura phosphorica (Vell.) H.Rob.; Vernonia polyanthes Less.

= Vernonanthura polyanthes =

Species of flowering plant

Vernonanthura polyanthes is a species of Neotropical plant in the tribe Vernonieae.

== Description ==
It is a shrub or small tree, bearing white flowers in terminal heads during late winter (July to August). Its vertical bole and dull green, oblong-lanceolate leaves may remind of a Eucalyptus species.

== Range and habitat ==
It is native to Brazil but was introduced to Sussundenga, Mozambique, in the early 1990s from where it quickly spread to Zimbabwe. In Africa it is a dominant invasive species, but it appears to compete best in disturbed areas along roadsides or along forest margins. It has invaded higher altitudes in lower densities.

== Uses and agricultural impact ==
Its ample nectar supplies nourishment to bees in winter. For that reason it was introduced to Mozambique, but it also takes over fallow lands, where their eradication is labour-intensive.
