= Museo Nacional de Culturas Populares =

Cultural museum in Mexico City

National Museum of Popular Cultures
- Museo Nacional de Culturas Populares
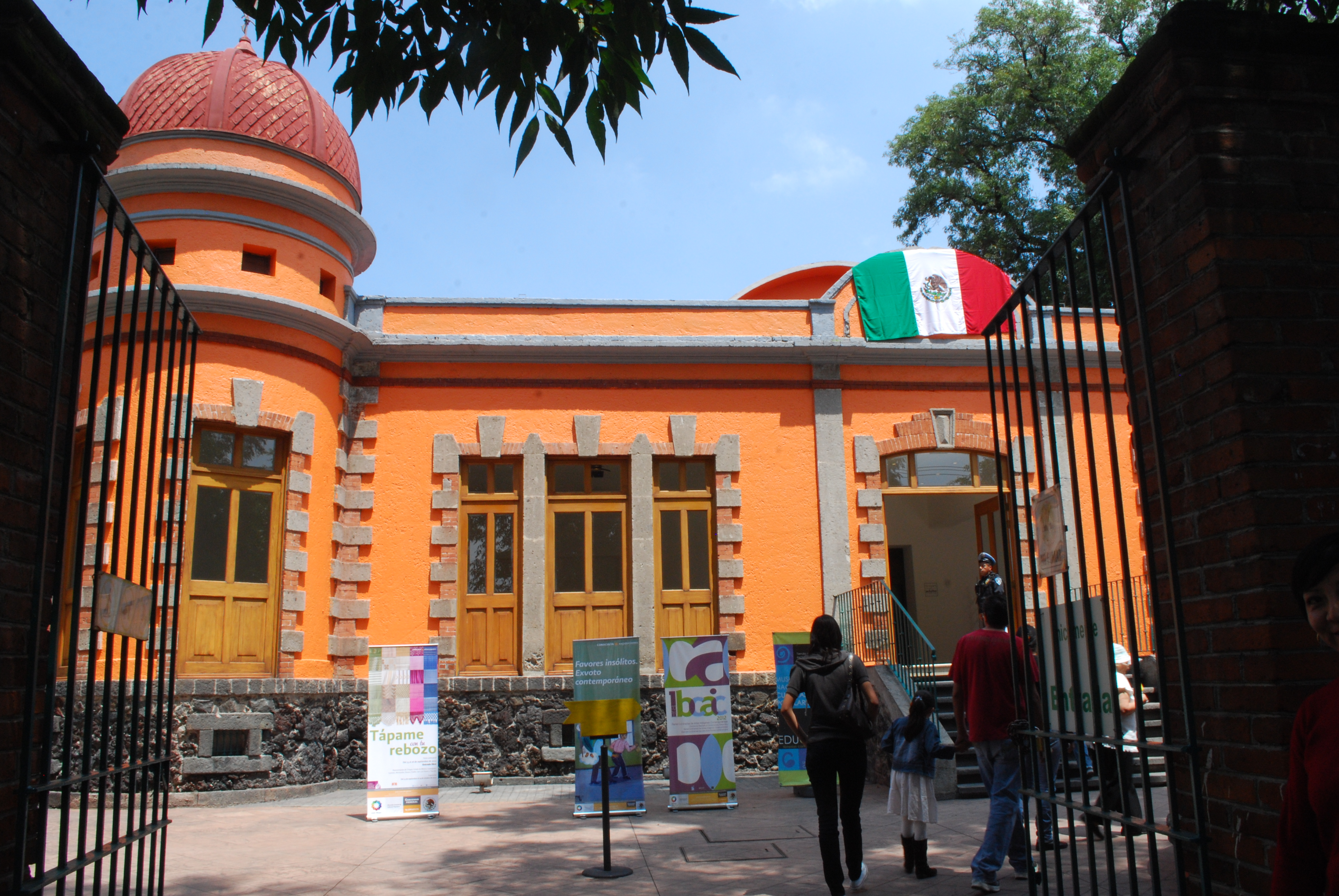
- Entrance to the museum
- Established: 1982
- Location: Av. Miguel Hidalgo 289, Coyoacán, Mexico City
- Coordinates: 19°20′59.76″N 99°9′39.58″W
- Director: Rodolfo Rodríguez Castañeda
- Website: https://museoculturaspopulares.gob.mx/

Museo Nacional de las Culturas Populares (National Museum of Popular Cultures) is a museum in Mexico City dedicated to Mexico's ethnic and cultural diversity. This diversity not only includes that of its indigenous peoples, but also those of its regions and socioeconomic strata. It was founded in 1982 by anthropologist Guillermo Bonfil Batalla at a time when the country was accepting and promoting its cultural diversity. The museum does not have a large permanent collection but rather focuses on temporary exhibits, concerts, workshops and other cultural and educational events as well as promoting the creation of museums in Mexico to promote local cultures. The museum is also home to the Centro de Información y Documentación Alberto Beltrán, founded in 1971 to promote research and knowledge about Mexican handcrafts and folk art and indigenous ethnicities.

== Description ==
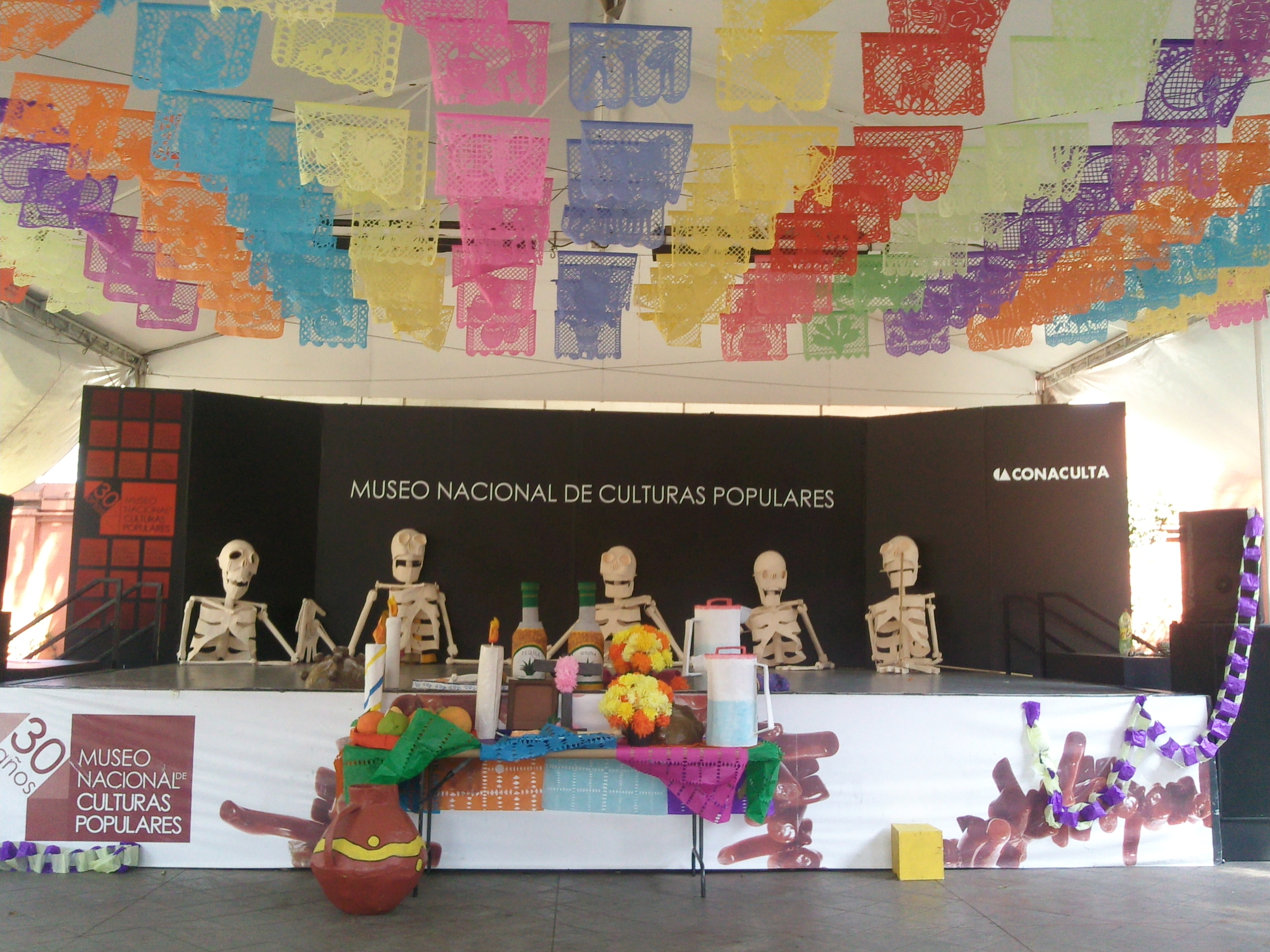
Museum decorated for Day of the Dead.

The museum was established as part of the acknowledgement in the latter 20th century that Mexico consists of various ethnicities and cultures. The term “culturas populares” (popular cultures) refers to indigenous peoples as well as those of different regions, and different socioeconomic levels. Its primary function is to document, promote and foment creative activities in the various subcultures of Mexico in both rural and urban areas through exhibitions and other activities. These activities include collections of art and other objects, photography, film, sound and documentation. The elements of these popular cultures are to be promoted as part of Mexico's national heritage. The main goal of the museum is not to form a large permanent collection but rather to stimulate the formation of museums and other institutions related to various topics. The museum is a part of the Dirección General de Culturas Populares which is a subsidiary of the Consejo Nacional para la Cultura y las Artes . The museum receives about 1.1 million visitors each year, who come to see its frequent temporary exhibitions and other events.

The museum site is on Avenida Hidalgo, in the historic center of the Mexico City borough of Coyoacán. It has five main exhibition areas: The chapel, the Quinta Margarita, the Moctezuma Annex, the patio areas and the Guillermo Bonfil Batalla Hall. The chapel is the main exhibition area, a building that dates to the mid 19th century. It has two floors with exhibition space, the Educal bookstore, restoration and storage facilities. On the second level there are areas for conferences and other events. The Quinta Margarita is a square covered patio space which can hold 300 people, used for conferences, workshops, shows and concerts. The Moctezuma Annex is a small building which houses the museum's educational services and host educational events. There are a number of patio areas called Jacarandas, Central and Moctezuma which are used for auditions, dances, book presentations, conferences and exhibitions. The Guillermo Bonfil Batalla Hall was built in 1981 for large scale exhibitions.

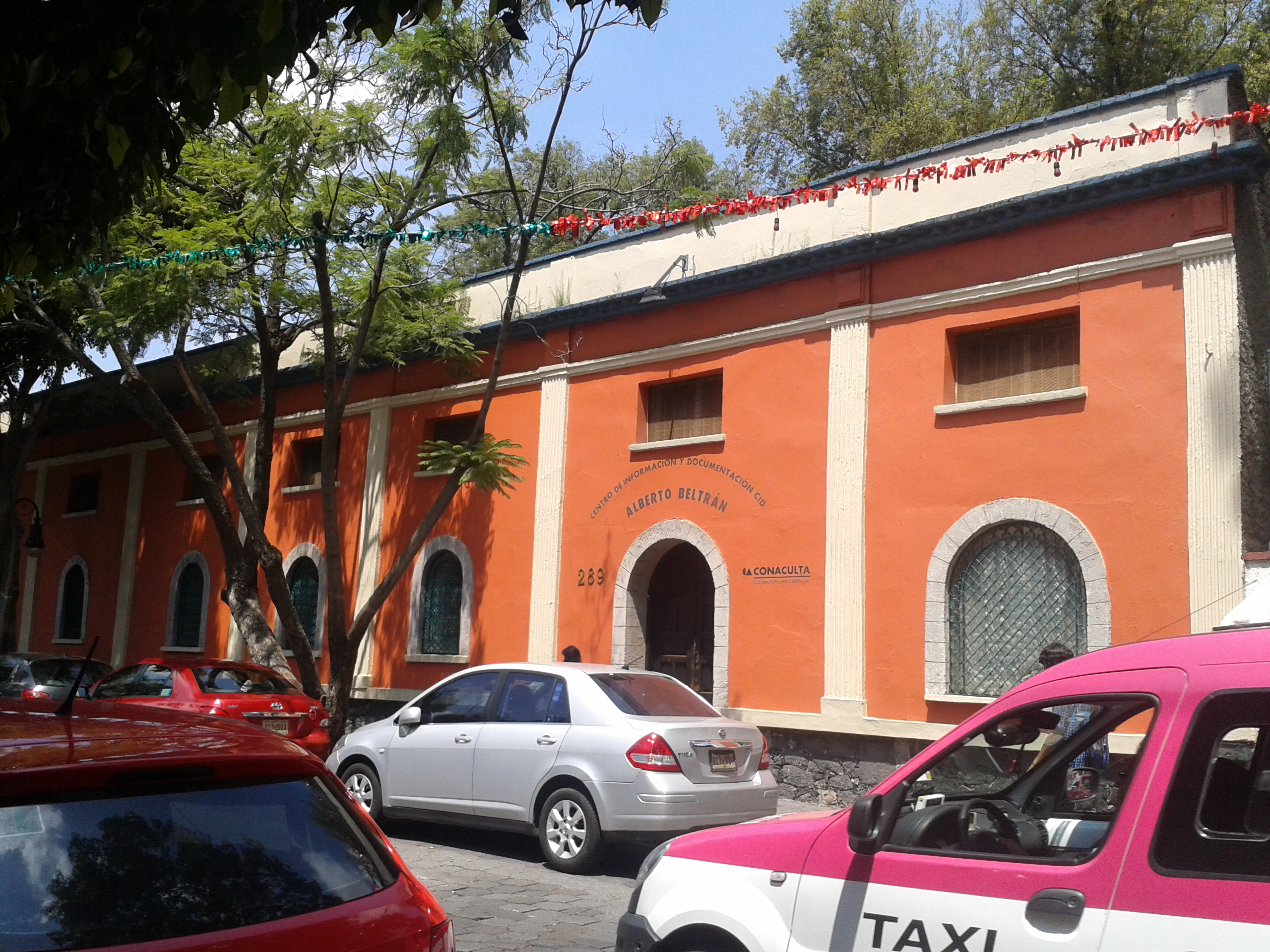
Alberto Beltrán Center of Information and Documentation, housed by the Museum of Popular Cultures

The Centro de Información y Documentación Alberto Beltrán (Alberto Beltrán Information and Documentation Center) has over 152,000 titles divided into six permanent collections related to Mexico's various cultures: documents, sound library, periodical library, video library and books and is open to the public. It was originally established in 1971, predating the museum, by the Dirección General de Arte Popular and the Secretaría de Educación Pública along with graphic artist Alberto Beltrán to promote research into Mexican handcrafts and folk art along with its indigenous ethnicities. The name of Albert Beltrán was added in his honor in 2005.

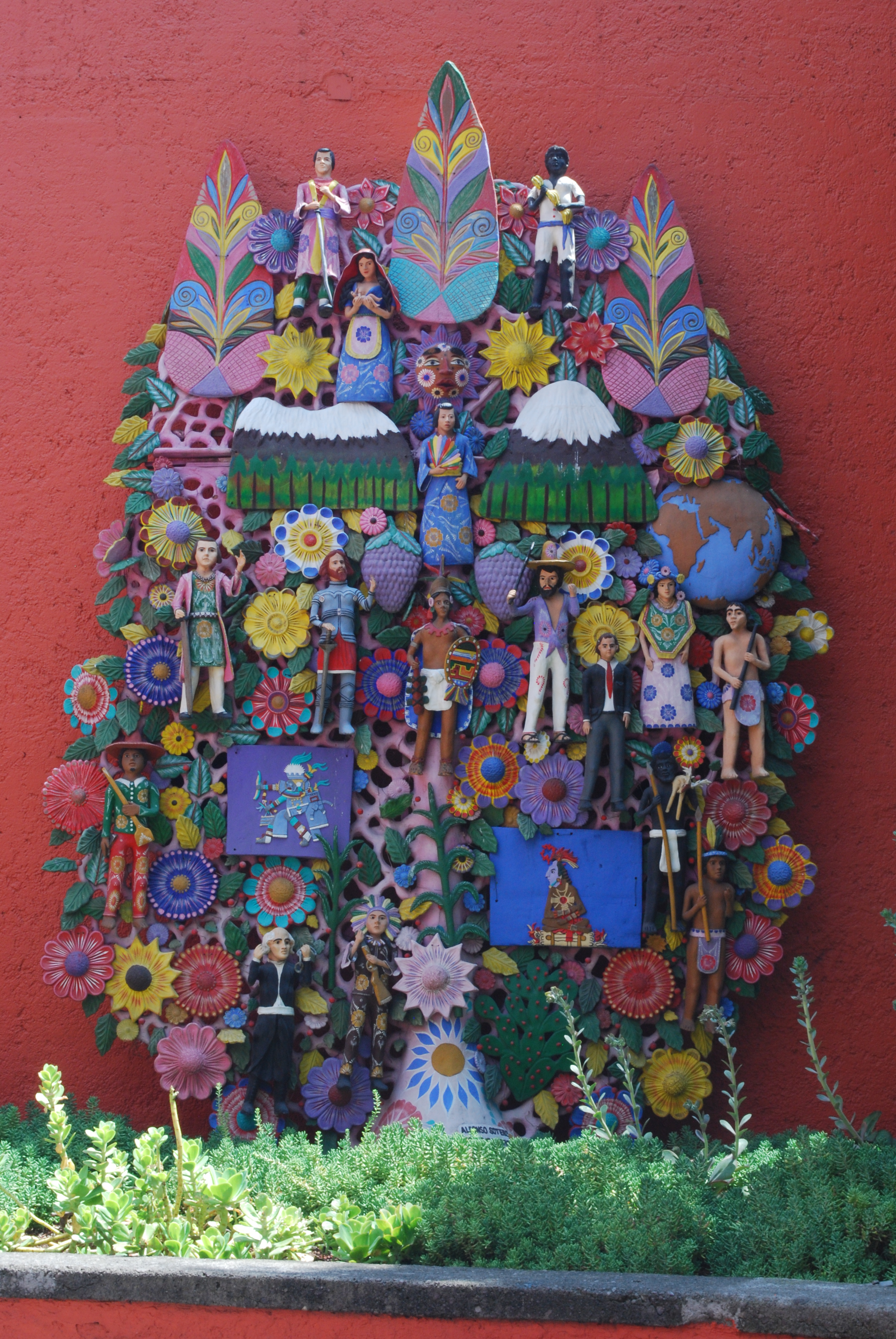
Tree of Life sculpture at the museum

Other important installations on the site are the Cuezcomate, the Árbol de la Vida and the Tejedores de Sueños mural. The Cuezcomate is a Nahuatl word that means “guard bread or grain.” It is a replica of a Mesoamerican construction made of clay and palm fronds used to store corn. The structure here is modeled on those of the state of Morelos. It was created for the museum's first major exhibition in 1982 and remains in the patio areas. The Arbol de la Vida, or Tree of Life, is a fired clay sculpture mostly associated with Metepec, State of Mexico. This five meter tall tree was created by José Alfonso Soteno Fernández in 1992 to commemorate the 500 anniversary of Columbus's discovery of the Americas. It contains allusions to indigenous culture when Columbus arrived, Spanish culture and that of African slaves brought over which have combined to create the various manifestations of Mexican culture. The Tejedores de Sueños mural is a graffiti mural. The iconography is eclectic with images of nopal cactus, masked persons, robotic insects and crosses in a style which combines Mexican folk art and that of comic books.

The museum offers workshops and other classes for museum professionals interested in promoted Mexico's popular cultures. It also offers guided tours which are generally associated with workshops. The museum maintains a full schedule of academic, cultural and recreational activities, including concerts, dances, conferences, seminars, workshops, videos, book and music presentations, sales of Mexican handcrafts and Mexican food. The museum has been the site of an annual Tamale Festival since 1993, with examples of tamales from all over Mexico.

Most of its major events are temporary exhibits related to some aspect of Mexico's cultures. In 1997 it had an exhibition called La Ruta de la Esclavo tracing the history of African slavery in Mexico during the colonial period. For Day of the Dead 2011, the museum held an event called Tzompantli Gráfico where twenty artists including Fupete from Italy and Lucas Varela from Argentina, created modern skull images to arrange similar to that of a Mesoamerican tzompantli or skull-rack. For the same holiday, it held Ofrendas con la boca y el pie: lienzos llenos de tradición with Day of the Dead altars from an artists’ group called Asociación de Pintores con la Boca y con el Pie founded in 1963 who paint with their mouths or feet because of a disability.

In 2012 the museum held a temporary exhibition called “Favores insólitos. Exvoto contemporáneo", which features votive paintings that have nontraditional themes such as prostitution, table dance, sexual diversity, infidelity, figures from popular culture, problems with family members and witchcraft. That same year it held an exhibition called “Tápame con tu rebozo” demonstrating and selling rebozos from various parts of central and southern Mexico, dating from 1860 to 2012. It also exhibited 3,500 pieces of jewelry and other adornment in an exhibition called Las perlas de la Virgen y tus labios de coral. El adorno popular, which included Purépecha silver, Huichol beads, and silverwork and jewelry from Puebla, Chiapas, Yucatán and Veracruz . In 2012 it had an exhibition of fine art such as painting and photography done by indigenous people, with the aim of combating the notion that such is only done by those of European heritage. It also included more traditional artwork, evaluating its artistic properties. The museum has also had major exhibitions related to the working class, fishermen, the maguey plant, Mexican coffee and Mexican folk dance.

== History ==
It was inaugurated on September 24, 1982, by José López Portillo . Its founder and first director was anthropologist Guillermo Bonfil Batalla. Its first major program was called “El maíz, fundamento de la cultura popular mexicana” with an exhibition at the museum site as well as posters related to the topic, a monograph competition and various publications including a cookbook.

From 2005 to 2009, the site underwent two stages of renovation work, mostly on the chapel, building, which dates from the 19th century. The work included roof sealant, drainage, tools for workshops, and expanding its museum storage and exhibition facilities.
