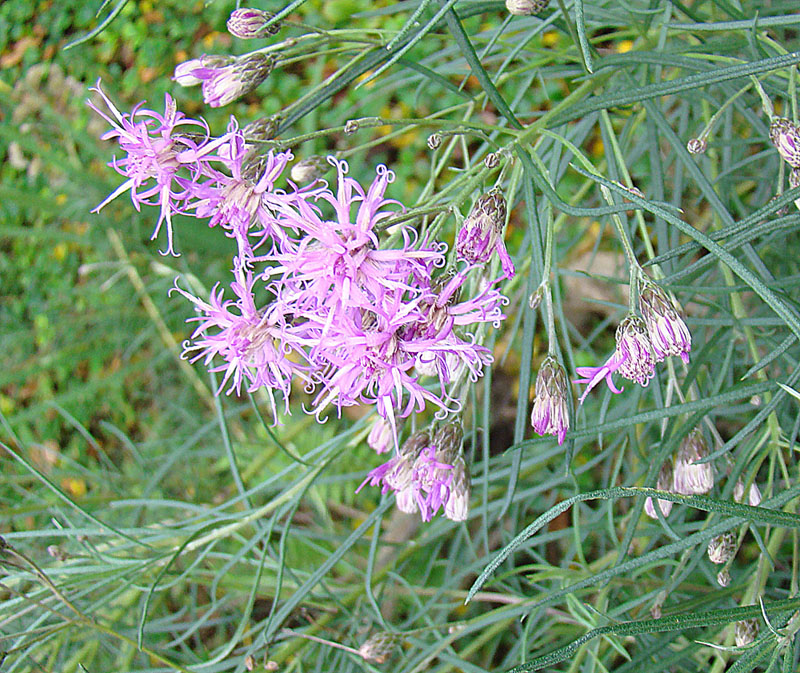
- Vernonanthura nudiflora

Scientific classification
- Kingdom: Plantae
- Clade: Embryophytes
- Clade: Tracheophytes
- Clade: Angiosperms
- Clade: Eudicots
- Clade: Asterids
- Order: Asterales
- Family: Asteraceae
- Subfamily: Vernonioideae
- Tribe: Vernonieae
- Genus: Vernonanthura; H.Rob.

Type species
- Vernonanthura brasiliana (L.) H.Rob.

= Vernonanthura =

Genus of flowering plants

Vernonanthura is a genus of Neotropical plants in the tribe Vernonieae within the family Asteraceae.

The genus name of Vernonanthura is in honour of William Vernon (1666/67 - ca.1711), who was an English plant collector, (bryologist) and entomologist from Cambridge University, who collected in Maryland, USA in 1698. As well as the complex ending derived from 'anthera' (anther) and 'oura' (tail), referring to the frequently tailed anther base of the plant.

== Species ==
72 species are accepted.

- Vernonanthura almedae (H.Rob.) H.Rob.
- Vernonanthura amplexicaulis (R.E.Fr.) H.Rob.
- Vernonanthura angulata (H.Rob.) H.Rob.
- Vernonanthura auriculata (Griseb.) H.Rob.
- Vernonanthura beyrichii (Less.) H.Rob.
- Vernonanthura brasiliana (L.) H.Rob.
- Vernonanthura buxifolia (Less.) H.Rob.
- Vernonanthura cabralensis H.Rob.
- Vernonanthura catharinensis (Cabrera) H.Rob.
- Vernonanthura chamaedrys (Less.) H.Rob.
- Vernonanthura chaquensis (Cabrera) H.Rob.
- Vernonanthura cichoriifolia (Chodat) H.Rob.
- Vernonanthura cocleana (S.C.Keeley) H.Rob.
- Vernonanthura cordata (Kunth) H.Rob.
- Vernonanthura crassa (Vell.) H.Rob.
- Vernonanthura cuneifolia (Gardner) H.Rob.
- Vernonanthura cupularis (Chodat) H.Rob.
- Vernonanthura cymosa (Vell.) H.Rob.
- Vernonanthura densiflora (Gardner) A.J.Vega & Dematt.
- Vernonanthura discolor (Less.) H.Rob.
- Vernonanthura divaricata (Spreng.) H.Rob.
- Vernonanthura fagifolia (Gardner) H.Rob.
- Vernonanthura ferruginea (Less.) H.Rob.
- Vernonanthura fuertesii (Urb.) H.Rob.
- Vernonanthura glandulosodentata (Hieron.) G.Soares & Loeuille
- Vernonanthura havanensis (DC.) H.Rob.
- Vernonanthura hieracioides (Griseb.) H.Rob.
- Vernonanthura hilairiana (Gardner) A.J.Vega & Dematt.
- Vernonanthura ignobilis (Less.) H.Rob.
- Vernonanthura laxa (Gardner) H.Rob.
- Vernonanthura lindbergii (Baker) H.Rob.
- Vernonanthura lipeoensis (Cabrera) H.Rob.
- Vernonanthura loretensis (Hieron.) H.Rob.
- Vernonanthura lucida (Less.) H.Rob.
- Vernonanthura mariana (Mart. ex Baker) H.Rob.
- Vernonanthura membranacea (Gardner) H.Rob.
- Vernonanthura menthifolia (Poepp. ex Spreng.) H.Rob.
- Vernonanthura montevidensis (Spreng.) H.Rob.
- Vernonanthura mucronulata (Less.) H.Rob.
- Vernonanthura nana A.J.Vega & Dematt.
- Vernonanthura nudiflora (Less.) H.Rob.
- Vernonanthura oligactoides (Less.) H.Rob.
- Vernonanthura oligolepis (Sch.Bip. ex Baker) H.Rob.
- Vernonanthura paludosa (Gardner) H.Rob.
- Vernonanthura patens (Kunth) H.Rob.
- Vernonanthura perangusta (Malme) A.J.Vega & Dematt.
- Vernonanthura petiolaris (DC.) H.Rob.
- Vernonanthura phaeoneura (Toledo) H.Rob.
- Vernonanthura phosphorica (Vell.) H.Rob.
- Vernonanthura pinguis (Griseb.) H.Rob.
- Vernonanthura piresii (H.Rob.) H.Rob.
- Vernonanthura polyanthes (Spreng.) A.J.Vega & Dematt.
- Vernonanthura prenanthoides (Gleason) H.Rob.
- Vernonanthura pseudolinearifolia (Hieron.) A.J.Vega & Dematt.
- Vernonanthura pseudonudiflora (Hieron.) H.Rob.
- Vernonanthura puberula (Less.) H.Rob.
- Vernonanthura rigiophylla (Kuntze) H.Rob.
- Vernonanthura rubriramea (Mart. ex DC.) Loeuille & P.N.Soares
- Vernonanthura sambrayana (S.B.Jones) H.Rob.
- Vernonanthura santacruzensis (Hieron.) H.Rob.
- Vernonanthura schulziana (Cabrera) H.Rob.
- Vernonanthura sinclairii (Benth.) H.Rob.
- Vernonanthura spathulata M.Monge & Semir
- Vernonanthura squamulosa (Hook. & Arn.) H.Rob.
- Vernonanthura stellaris (La Llave) Al.Rodr.
- Vernonanthura subverticillata (Sch.Bip. ex Baker) H.Rob.
- Vernonanthura tuerckheimii (Urb.) H.Rob.
- Vernonanthura tweedieana (Baker) H.Rob.
- Vernonanthura vinhae (H.Rob.) H.Rob.
- Vernonanthura viscidula (Less.) H.Rob.
- Vernonanthura warmingiana Dematt.
- Vernonanthura westiniana (Less.) H.Rob.

formerly included

see Critoniopsis, Vernonia, Vickianthus

- Vernonanthura cichoriiflora (Chodat) H.Rob. - Vernonia cichoriiflora Chodat
- Vernonanthura cronquistii (S.B.Jones) H.Rob. - Vickianthus cronquistii (S.B.Jones) H.Rob.
- Vernonanthura hintoniorum (B.L.Turner) H.Rob. - Vickianthus hintoniorum (B.L.Turner) H.Rob.
- Vernonanthura liatroides (DC.) H.Rob. - Vickianthus liatroides (DC.) H.Rob.
- Vernonanthura oaxacana (Sch.Bip. ex Klatt) H.Rob. - Vickianthus oaxacanus (Sch.Bip. ex Klatt) H.Rob.
- Vernonanthura patens (Kunth) H.Rob. - Vernonia patens Kunth
- Vernonanthura serratuloides (Kunth) H.Rob. - Vickianthus serratuloides (Kunth) H.Rob.
- Vernonanthura stellata (Spreng.) H.Rob. - Critoniopsis stellata (Spreng.) H.Rob.
