= Lake Pátzcuaro =

Lake in Mexico

- Pátzcuaro Lake
- Lago de Pátzcuaro (Spanish)
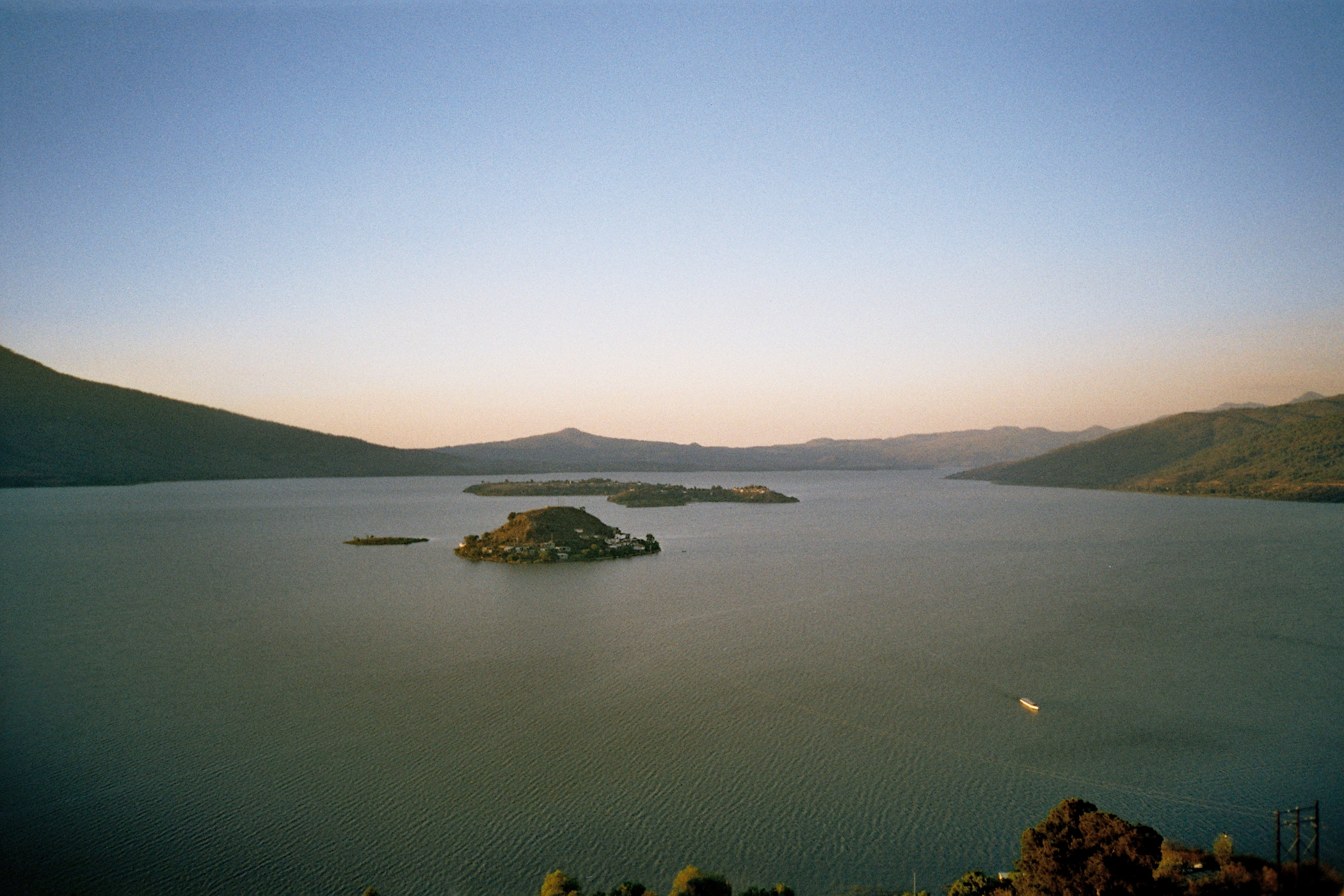
- View from Janitzio Island

- Location within Mexico
- Location: Pátzcuaro, Michoacán
- Coordinates: 19°36′54″N 101°39′00″W
- Catchment area: 929 square kilometres (359 sq mi)
- Basin countries: Mexico
- Max. length: 50 kilometres (31 mi)
- Max. width: 33 kilometres (21 mi)
- Surface area: 126.4 square kilometres (48.8 sq mi)
- Max. depth: 12 metres (39 ft)
- Water volume: 580 cubic hectometres (2.0×10^{10} cu ft)
- Surface elevation: 2,035 metres (6,677 ft)
- Islands: Jaracuaro, Uranden, Janitzio, Pacanda, Yunuen, Tecuena
- Settlements: Pátzcuaro, Erongarícuaro, Quiroga, Tzintzuntzan

Ramsar Wetland
- Official name: Humedales del Lago de Pátzcuaro
- Designated: 2 February 2005
- Reference no.: 1447

Lake Pátzcuaro (Spanish: Lago de Pátzcuaro) is a lake in the municipality of Pátzcuaro, Michoacán, Mexico.

Lake Pátzcuaro lies in an endorheic basin, which does not drain to the sea. A watershed area of 929 square kilometres drains into the lake, of which 126.4 are the water body. The Lake Pátzcuaro watershed extends 50 kilometres east–west and 33 kilometres from north to south. Lake Pátzcuaro lies at an elevation of 2,035 metres, and is the center of the basin and is surrounded by volcanic mountains with very steep slopes. It has an average depth of 5 metres and a maximum of 12. Its volume is approximately 580 million cubic metres.

The Lake Pátzcuaro basin is of volcanic origin. At times it has been part of an open and continuous hydrological system formed by Lake Cuitzeo, Pátzcuaro and Lake Zirahuén, which drained into the Lerma River. Today, like lakes Cuitzeo and Zirahuén, it is a closed basin, although ecologists consider it a sub-basin of the Lerma-Chapala basin.

== Wetlands ==
The lake is surrounded by extensive wetlands, which have been designated as a Ramsar site since 2005. Cattails and other reedy vegetation are the dominant wetland vegetation, in dense stands over 2 meters tall. Typical wetland plant genera include Typha, Scirpus, Eleocharis, and Cyperus. The dominant species of aquatic vegetation are Potamogeton illinoensis, Scirpus pectinatus, Typha latifolia, T. domingensis, and Nymphaea mexicana.

The wetlands are extremely important for birds, both year-round inhabitants and migrating waterfowl. Close to 200 species inhabit the wetlands, including some endemic species such as the black-polled yellowthroat (Geothlypis speciosa). Two native species have not been observed recently; the yellow rail (Coturnicops noveboracensis) has not been seen since 1964 and may be locally extinct, and the endemic slender-billed grackle (Quiscalus palustris) is presumed extinct.

The Lake Pátzcuaro salamander (Ambystoma dumerilii) is endemic to the basin. Among other aquatic or semi-aquatic animals, several are largely or entirely restricted to the Lake Pátzcuaro system, such as the rough-footed mud turtle of the subspecies tarascense, the essentially harmless Mexican garter snake of the subspecies patzcuaroensis, the fish Pátzcuaro chub (Algansea lacustris) and Pátzcuaro allotoca (Allotoca diazi), and the dwarf crayfish Cambarellus patzcuarensis.

The lake and its surrounding wetlands have undergone significant environmental changes over the past 50 years. Logging and agriculture in the surrounding watershed have contributed to siltation of the lake (1 cm / year - 1.2 million cubic meters / year), and water diversion for agriculture and urbanization has reduced the size of the lake by 40 square kilometers, and 2.6 meters in depth. Other threats include untreated sewage, the introduction of exotic species, and chemical pollution.

In February 2021, members of the Supreme Indigenous Council of Michoacán (CSIM) noted that political opportunism, corruption, and a lack of coordination have undermined efforts to clean up the lake. They noted that since 2006 MXN $5 billion has been spent, and since 1934, 2,300 studies have been conducted, yet 79% of the inhabitants of Pátzcuaro, Erongarícuaro, Quiroga, and Tzintzuntzan live in poverty and 40% in extreme poverty.

== Watershed ==
In the watershed surrounding the wetlands, the natural terrestrial vegetation is composed of xeric scrub (1,920–2,100 m above sea level), pine and oak forests intertwined with xeric scrub (2,100–2,400 m) and by pure pine-oak forests in the higher peaks (2,400–2,900 m). The pine-oak forests are part of the Trans-Mexican Volcanic Belt pine-oak forests ecoregion.

In the last fifty years, human activity in the watershed has intensified. Farming and livestock ranching in the basin have significantly increased. Over 10,000 hectares of forest have been lost to logging, fires, fuelwood gathering, and clearance for farming and ranching.

== History ==
The Lake Pátzcuaro basin is home to the Purépecha people. Purépecha leaders established the basin as the heartland of the Tarascan state, which rivaled the Aztec Empire before the Spanish conquest. The towns of Ihuatzio, Tzintzuntzan and Pátzcuaro were important Purépecha centers.

== Islands in the lake ==
- Jaracuaro
- Uranden - Small island.
- Janitzio - Island with tourist facilities
- Pacanda - The largest, flattest island. Cabanas for rent.
- Yunuen - Small island
- Tecuena - Sparsely populated island

== Major towns along the lake shore ==
- Pátzcuaro - Situated on the southeastern shore of Lake Patzcuaro
- Erongarícuaro - Historic Purépecha site
- Quiroga - Thriving market town
- Tzintzuntzan - Market town with ruins nearby - Capital of the P'urhépechas

== Minor towns along the lake shore ==
- Tocuaro - woodworking and maskmaking
- Opongio - mezcal distillery
- Puacuaro
- Arocutin
- Ihuatzio - ancient temple ruins called yacatas.
- Santa Fe La Laguna - crafts
- Cucuchuchu
- Uricho
- Napizaro
- Erongarícuaro

== Nearby areas ==
- Lake Zirahuén
- Santa Clara del Cobre
