= Tocuaro =

Village in Michoacán, Mexico

Coordinates: 19.539°N 101.694°W

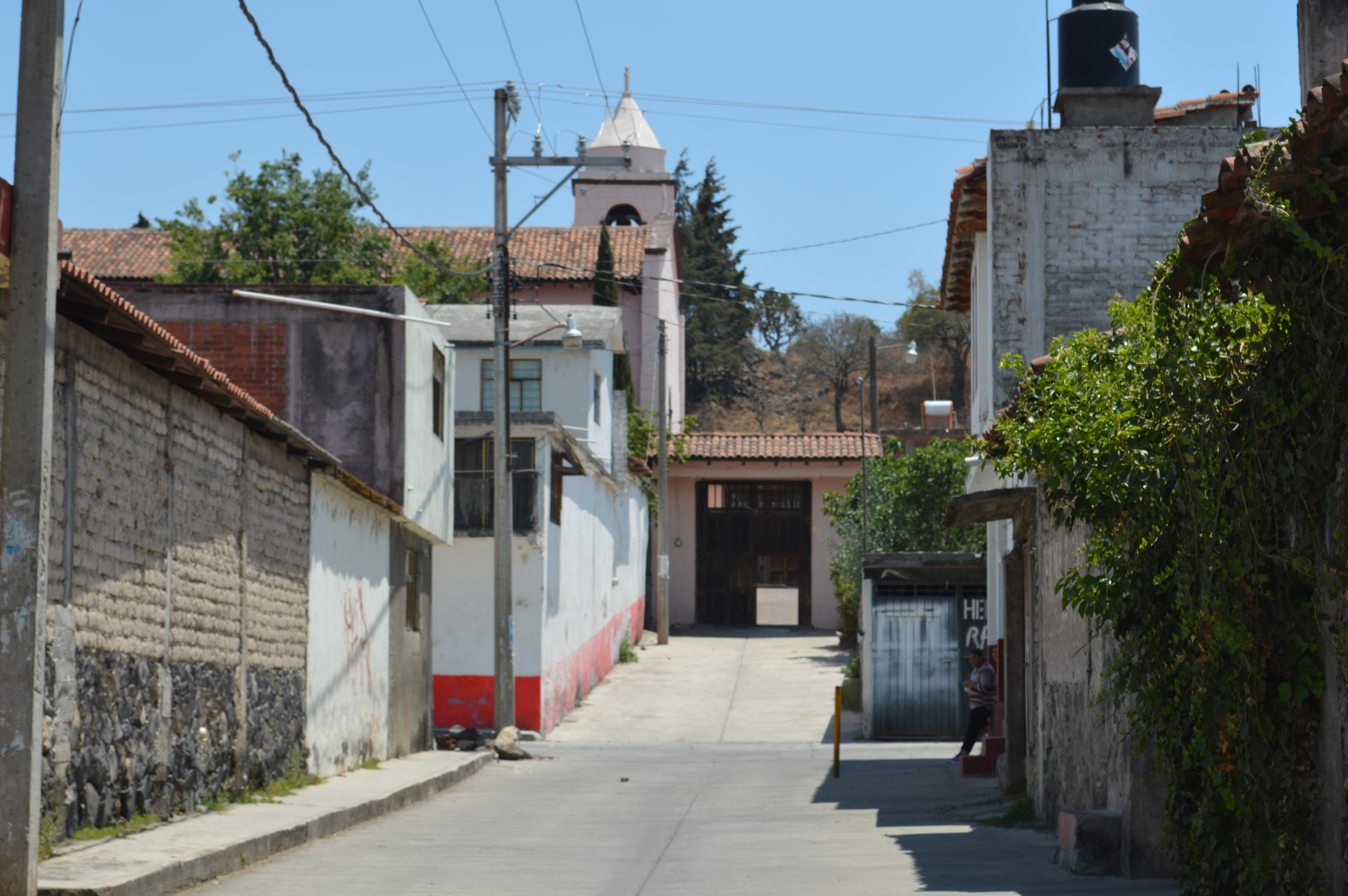
Street leading to the main church in Tocuaro, Michoacan.

Tocuaro is a small village near Lake Pátzcuaro in the Mexican state of Michoacán.

It is 340 km. from Mexico city. It only has 600 people and a minimal number of shops and churches. It is one of the small villages surrounding Patzcuaro which are famous for their art. Santa Clara del Cobre is famous for copper work. Tocuaro is famous for masks. There used to be two good mask makers, an uncle and a nephew. The uncle made large masks and the nephew small masks. They are carved from Copal and sometimes painted, especially the "Devil Masks" which are ornate and very colorful. The masks are sold in the village and at the market in Patzcuaro.
