= Mazatecan languages =

Group of Oto-Manguean languages of southern Mexico

Mazatec
- En Ngixo
- Region: Mexico, states of Oaxaca, Puebla and Veracruz
- Ethnicity: Mazatec
- Native speakers: 240,000 (2020 census)
- Language family: Oto-Manguean: Popolocan; Mazatec

Official status
- Official language in: In Mexico through the General Law of Linguistic Rights of Indigenous Peoples (in Spanish).

Language codes
- ISO 639-3: Variously: maa – Tecóatl maj – Jalapa maq – Chiquihuitlán mau – Huautla mzi – Ixcatlán pbm – Puebla Mazatec vmp – Soyaltepec vmy – Ayautla vmz – Mazatlán
- Glottolog: maza1295
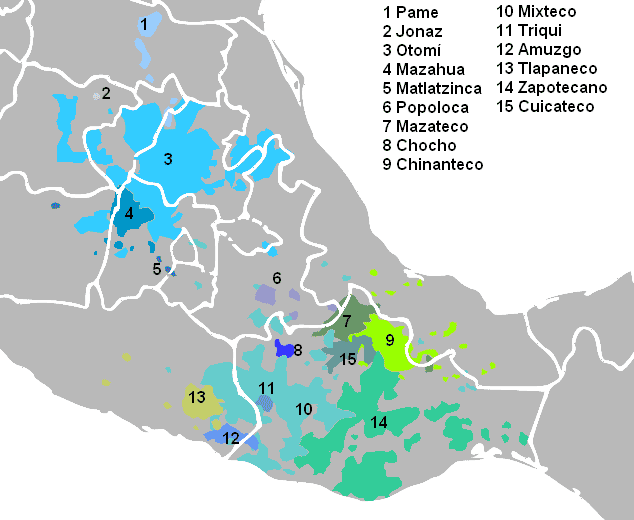
- The Mazatecan language, number 7 (olive), center-east.

The Mazatecan languages are a group of closely related indigenous languages spoken by some 200,000 people in the area known as the Sierra Mazateca, which is in the northern part of the state of Oaxaca in southern Mexico, as well as in adjacent areas of the states of Puebla and Veracruz.

The group is often described as a single language called Mazatec, but because several varieties are not mutually intelligible, they are better described as a group of languages. The languages belong to the Popolocan subgroup of the Oto-Manguean language family. Under the General Law of Linguistic Rights of the Indigenous Peoples, they are recognized as "national languages" in Mexico, along with Spanish and other indigenous languages.

The Mazatec language is vigorous in many of the smaller communities of the Mazatec area, and in many towns, it is spoken by almost everyone. But in some of the larger communities, such as Huautla de Jiménez and Jalapa de Díaz, more people are beginning to use Spanish more frequently.

Like other Oto-Manguean languages, the Mazatecan languages are tonal; tone plays an integral part in distinguishing both lexical items and grammatical categories. The centrality of tone to the Mazatec language is exploited by the system of whistle speech, used in most Mazatec communities, which allows speakers of the language to have entire conversations only by whistling.

== Classification ==
The Mazatecan languages are part of the Oto-Manguean language family and belong to the family's Eastern branch. In that branch, they belong to the Popolocan subgroup, together with the Popoloca, Ixcatec and Chocho languages. Daniel Garrison Brinton was the first to propose a classification of the Mazatec languages, which he correctly grouped with the Zapotec and Mixtec languages. In 1892 he second-guessed his own previous classification and suggested that Mazatec was related to Chiapanec-Mangue and Chibcha.

Early comparative work by Morris Swadesh, Roberto Weitlaner and Stanley Newman laid the foundations for comparative Oto-Manguean studies. Weitlaner's student, María Teresa Fernandez de Miranda, was the first to propose reconstruction of the Popolocan languages. While the work cited Mazatec data, she left Mazatecan out of the reconstruction.

Subsequent work by Summer Institute linguist Sarah Gudschinsky gave a full reconstruction first of Proto-Mazatec (Gudschinsky 1956). She next reconstructed what she called Proto-Popolocan-Mazatecan (Gudschinsky 1959) (it was referred to as Popotecan, but this term was not widely adopted.)

== Languages ==
The ISO 639-3 standard enumerates nine Mazatecan languages. They are named after the villages where they are commonly spoken (with the exception of Puebla Mazatec):

- Chiquihuitlán Mazatec (2500 speakers in San Juan Chiquihuitlán. Quite divergent from other varieties.)
- Central
  - Huautla Mazatec (50,000 speakers. The prestige variety of Mazatec, spoken in Huautla de Jiménez).
  - Ayautla Mazatec (3500 speakers in San Bartolome Ayautla. Quite similar to Huautla.)
  - Mazatlán Mazatec (13,000 speakers in Mazatlán and surrounding villages. Somewhat similar to Huautla.)
- Eloxochitlán Mazatec, aka Jerónimo Mazatec (34,000 speakers in San Jerónimo Tecóatl, San Lucas Zoquiapan, Santa Cruz Acatepec, San Antonio Eloxochitlán, and many other villages. Somewhat similar to Huautla.)
- Ixcatlán Mazatec (11,000 speakers in San Pedro Ixcatlán, Chichicazapa, and Nuevo Ixcatlán. Somewhat similar to Huautla.)
- Jalapa Mazatec (16,000 speakers in San Felipe Jalapa de Díaz. Somewhat similar to Huautla.)
- Soyaltepec Mazatec (23,000 speakers in San Maria Jacaltepec and San Miguel Soyaltepec. Somewhat similar to Huautla.)
- Puebla and Northeastern Mazatec (33,800 speakers in both Oaxaca and Puebla states.)

Studies of mutual intelligibility between Mazatec-speaking communities revealed that most are relatively close but distinct enough that literacy programs must recognize local standards. The Huautla, Ayautla, and Mazatlán varieties are about 80% mutually intelligible; Tecóatl (Eloxochitlán), Jalapa, Ixcatlán, and Soyaltepec are more distant, at 70%+ intelligibility with Huautla or with each other. Chiquihuitlán is divergent.

In 2020, there were 237,000 speakers of Mazatecan languages according to INEGI. Approximately 80% of the speakers know and use Spanish for some purposes. Many Mazatec children know little or no Spanish when they enter school.

== Dialect history ==
The language is divided into many dialects, or varieties, some of which are not mutually intelligible. The western dialects spoken in Huautla de Jiménez, and San Mateo Huautla, Santa María Jiotes, Eloxochitlán, Tecóatl, Ayautla, and Coatzospan are often referred to as Highland Mazatec. The North Eastern dialects spoken in San Miguel Huautla, Jalapa de Díaz, Mazatlán de Flores, San Pedro Ixcatlán, and San Miguel Soyaltepec are referred to as Lowland Mazatec. The Highland and Lowland dialects differ by a number of sound changes shared by each of the groups, particularly sound changes affecting the proto-Mazatecan phoneme /*tʲ/.

Also, the high dialects of Huautla and Jiotes used "sh", along with the low dialects of San Miguel, Jalapa, and Ixatlán. The use of "sh" in both dialects corresponded with "ch," which was used in the high dialects of Tecoatl, Eloxochitlan, San Mateo, and the low dialects of Mazatlan and Soyaltepec. Linguists believe that "Sh" and "ch" were reflexes of Proto-Poplocan.

The San Miguel Huautla dialect occupies an intermediary position, sharing traits with both groups. The division between highland and lowland dialects corresponds to the political division between highland and lowland territories that existed from 1300 to 1519. During the period of Aztec dominance from 1456 to 1519, the Highland territory was ruled from Teotitlán del Camino and the lowland territory from Tuxtepec. The political division remains today.

The distinction between highland and lowland dialects is supported by shared sound changes: in Lowland Mazatec dialects, Proto-Mazatecan /*tʲ/ merged with /*t/ before front vowels /*i/ and /*e/, and in the Highland dialects, /*tʲ/ merged with /*ʃ/ in position before /*k/.

=== Lowland dialects ===
Lowland dialects then split into Valley dialects and the dialect of San Miguel Huautla. The dialect of San Miguel Huautla underwent the same sound change of /*tʲ/ to /ʃ/ before /*k/, which had already happened in the highland dialects, but in San Miguel Huautla, the shift happened after the merger of /*tʲ/ with /*t/ before /*i/ and /*e/. The Valley dialects underwent a change of /*n/ to /ɲ/ in sequences with a /vowel-hn-a/ or /vowel-hn-u/.

The Valley dialects then separated into Southern (Mazatlán and Jalapa) and Northern (Soyaltepec and Ixcatlán) valley dialects. The Southern dialects changed /*tʲ/ to /t/ before /*k/ (later changing *tk to /hk/ in Mazatlán and simplifying to /k/ in Jalapa), and the Northern dialects changed /t͡ʃ/ to /t͡ʂ/ before /*/a. The dialect of Ixcatlán then separated from the one of Soyaltepec by changing sequences of /*tʲk/ and /*tk/ to /tik/ and /tuk/, respectively.

=== Highland dialects ===
The Highland dialects split into Western and Eastern (Huautla de Jiménez and Jiotes) groups; in the Western dialects the sequence /*ʃk/ changed to /sk/, but the Eastern ones changed it to /hk/. The dialect of Huautla de Jiménez then changed sequences of /*tʲh/ to *ʃ before short vowels, and the dialect of Santa Maria Jiotes merged the labialized velar stop kʷ to k.

- Mazatec
  - Chiquihuitlán [maq]
  - - Highland
      - Western
        San Mateo Huautla [mau], Eloxochitlán [maa], Tecóatl [maa], Ayautla [vmy], Coatzospan
      - Eastern
        Huautla de Jiménez [mau], Jiotes
    - Lowland
      - San Miguel Hualtepec [mau]
      - Valley
        - Southern
          Jalapa [maj], Mazatlán [vmz]
        - Northern
          Ixcatlán [mzi], Soyaltepec [vmp]

== Phonology ==
Like many other Oto-Manguean languages, Mazatecan languages have complex phonologies characterized by complex tone systems and several uncommon phonation phenomena such as creaky voice, breathy voice and ballistic syllables. The following review of a Mazatecan phoneme inventory will be based on the description of the Jalapa de Díaz variety published by Silverman, Blankenship et al. (1995).

=== Comparative Mazatec phonology ===
The Mazatecan variety with the most thoroughly described phonology is that of Jalapa de Díaz, which has been described in two publications by Silverman, Blankenship, Kirk and Ladefoged (1994 and 1995). The description is based on acoustic analysis and contemporary forms of phonological analysis. To give an overview of the phonological variety among Mazatecan languages, it is presented here and compared to the earlier description of Chiquihuitlán Mazatec published by the SIL linguist A. R. Jamieson, in 1977, which is not based on modern acoustic analysis and relies on a much more dated phonological theory and so it should be regarded as a tentative account. One fundamental distinction between the analyses is that Silverman et al. analyze distinctions between aspirated and nasalized consonants, but Jamieson analyzes them as sequences of two or more phonemes, arriving therefore at a much smaller number of consonants.

==== Vowels ====
There is considerable differences in the number of vowels in different Mazatec varieties. Huautla de Jíménez Mazatec has only four contrasting vowel qualities /i e a o/, and Chiquihuitlán has six.

Jalapa Mazatec has a basic five vowel system contrasting back and front vowels and closed and open vowel height, with an additional mid high back vowel [o]. Additional vowels distinguish oral, nasal, breathy and creaky phonation types. There is some evidence that there are also ballistic syllables contrasting with non-ballistic ones.

	Front				Back			
	oral	nasal	creaky	breathy	oral	nasal	creaky	breathy
Close	[i]	[ĩ]	[ḭ]	[i̤]	[u]	[ũ]	[ṵ]	[ṳ]
Close-mid					[o]	[õ]	[o̰]	[o̤]
Open	[æ]	[æ̃]	[æ̰]	[æ̤]	[ɑ]	[ɑ̃]	[ɑ̰]	[ɑ̤]

Chiquihuitlán Mazatec on the other hand is described as having 6 vowels and a nasal distinction. Jamieson does not describe a creaky/breathy phonation distinction but instead describes vowels interrupted by glottal stop or aspiration corresponding to creakiness and breathiness respectively.

	Front				Back			
	oral	nasal	interrupted by ʔ	interrupted by h	oral	nasal	interrupted by ʔ	interrupted by h
Close	[i]	[ĩ]	[ḭ]	[i̤]	[u]	[ũ]	[ṵ]	[ṳ]
Close-mid	[e]	[ẽ]	[ḛ]	[e̤]	[o]	[õ]	[o̰]	[o̤]
Open	[æ]	[æ̃]	[æ̰]	[æ̤]	[ɑ]	[ɑ̃]	[ɑ̰]	[ɑ̤]

==== Tone ====
Tone systems differ markedly between varieties. Jalapa Mazatec has three level tones (high, mid, low) and at least 6 contour tones (high-mid, low-mid, mid-low, mid-high, low-high, high-low-high). Chiquihuitlán Mazatec has a more complex tone system with four level tones (high, midhigh, midlow, low) and 13 different contour tones (high-low, midhigh-low, midlow-low, high-high (longer than a single high), midhigh-high, midlow-high, low-high, high-high-low, midhigh-high-low, midlow-high-low, low-high-low, low-midhigh-low, low-midhigh).

Mazatec of Huautla de Jiménez´ has distinctive tones on every syllable, and the same seems to be the case in Chiquihuitlán. Mazatec distinguishes tone only for certain syllables. Huautla Mazatec has no system of tonal sandhi, but the Chiquihuitlán variety has complex sandhi rules.

==== Consonants ====
Jalapa Mazatec has a three-way contrast between aspirated/voiceless, voiced, and nasalized articulation for all plosives, nasals and approximants. The lateral [l] occurs only in loanwords, and the tap [ɾ] occurs in only one morpheme, the clitic ɾa "probably". The bilabial aspirated and plain stops are also marginal phonemes.

		Bilabial	Dental		Palatal (-alveolar)	Velar	Glottal
Plosive/ Affricate	tenuis	(p)	t	ts	tʃ	k	ʔ
Plosive/ Affricate	aspirated	(pʰ)	tʰ	tsʰ	tʃʰ	kʰ	
Plosive/ Affricate	prenasal	ᵐb	ⁿd	ⁿd͡z	ⁿd͡ʒ	ᵑɡ	
Fricative			s		ʃ		h
Nasal	voiceless	m̥	n̥		ɲ̥		
Nasal	modal	m	n		ɲ		
Nasal	creaky	m̰	n̰		ɲ̰		
Approx.	voiceless				ȷ̊	w̥	
Approx.	plain		(l)		j	w	
Approx.	nasal				j̃	w̰	
Tap			(ɾ)				

=== Huautla Mazatec ===
==== Vowels ====
	Oral vowels			Nasal vowels			Laryngeal vowels		
	Front	Central	Back	Front	Central	Back	Front	Central	Back
Close	i			ĩ			ḭ		
Mid	e		o	ẽ		õ	ḛ		o̰
Open		a			ã			a̰	

==== Consonants ====
		Labial	Alveolar		Retroflex	Palatal	Velar	Glottal
Nasal	voiced	m	n			ɲ		
Nasal	aspirated	mʰ	nʰ					
Nasal	glottalized	ˀm	ˀn			ˀɲ		
Stop/ Affricate	voiceless	(p)	t	t͡s	t͡ʂ	t͡ʃ	k	ʔ
Stop/ Affricate	aspirated		tʰ	t͡sʰ	t͡ʂʰ	t͡ʃʰ	kʰ	
Stop/ Affricate	prenasal		ⁿd	ⁿd͡z	ᶯd͡ʐ		ᵑɡ	
Stop/ Affricate	voiced	b						
Fricative	voiceless		s		ʂ			h
Fricative	aspirated		sʰ					
Fricative	prenasal				ᶯʐ			
Rhotic	flap		ɾ					
Rhotic	trill		(r)					
Lateral			l					
Semivowel	central					j	w	
Semivowel	aspirated						wʰ	
Semivowel	glottalized					ˀj	ˀw	

/b/ may also be heard as a fricative [β]. Sounds [p, r] are from Spanish loanwords.

== Grammar ==
=== Verb morphology ===
In Chiquihutlán Mazatec, verb stems are of the shape CV (consonant+vowel) and are always inflected with a stem-forming prefix marking person and number of the subject and aspect. In addition, verbs always carry a suffix that marks the person and number of the subject. The vowel of the suffix fuses with the vowel of the verb stem.

There are 18 verb classes distinguished by the shape of their stem-forming prefixes. Classes 1, 2, 7, 10 and 15 cover intransitive verbs, and the rest of the classes involve transitive verbs. Transitive verbs have two prefix forms, one used for third person and first person singular and another used for the other persons (2nd person plural and singular and first person plural inclusive and exclusive). Clusivity distinctions as well as the distinction between second and first person is marked by the tonal pattern across the word (morphemes and stem do not have inherent lexical tone).

==== Person ====
Chiquihuitlán Mazatec distinguishes between three person categories (first, second, and third) and two numbers (singular, plural), and for the first person plural, it distinguishes between inclusive and exclusive categories. In the third person, number is not specified but only definiteness (definite or indefinite). Number is not expressed by free pronouns or noun phrases if it is directly retrievable from context.

==== Tense and aspect ====
Chiquihuitlán Mazatec inflects for four aspects: completive, continuative, incompletive, as well as a neutral or unmarked aspect. Completive aspect is formed by prefixing /ka-/ to the neutral verb form, continuative is formed by prefixing /ti-/. The incompletive aspect has a distinct set of stem forming prefixes as well as distinct tone patterns. In incompletive transitive verbs, only the first-person singular and the third-person prefixes vary from the corresponding neutral forms; the first-person plural and the second-person forms are identical to the corresponding neutral forms.

== Whistle speech ==
Most Mazatec communities employ forms of whistle speech in which linguistic utterances are produced by whistling the tonal contours of words and phrases. Mazatec languages lend themselves very well to becoming whistling languages because of the high functional load of tone in Mazatec grammar and semantics. Whistling is extremely common for young men, who often have complex conversations entirely through whistling.

Women, on the other hand, do not generally use whistle speech, just as older males use it more rarely than younger ones. Small boys learn to whistle while they learn to talk. Whistling is used generally to communicate over a distance, attract the attention of passersby, or avoid interfering with ongoing spoken conversations, but even economic transactions can be conducted entirely through whistling. Since whistle speech does not encode precise information about vowel or consonants, it is often ambiguous with several possible meanings. However, since most whistling treats a limited number of topics, it is normally unproblematic to disambiguate meaning through context.

== Media ==
Mazatecan-language programming is carried by the CDI's radio station XEOJN, based in San Lucas Ojitlán, Oaxaca.

The entire New Testament is available in several varieties of Mazatec.

A wide variety of Bible-based literature and video content is published in Mazatec by Jehovah's Witnesses.
