= Ixcatec =

Ixcatec or Ixcateco may refer to:

- Ixcatecos, an ethnic group of Mexico
- Ixcatec language, a language of Mexico
