= Jalapa Mazatec =

Mazatecan language of Oaxaca, Mexico

- Ndaxjò
- Native to: Oaxaca, Mexico
- Region: San Felipe Jalapa de Díaz
- Native speakers: (18,000 cited 2000)
- Language family: Oto-Manguean: Popolocan; Mazatecan; Lowland; Valley; Southern; Jalapa Mazatec

Language codes
- ISO 639-3: maj
- Glottolog: jala1237

Jalapa Mazatec is a Mazatecan language. An estimate from 1990 suggested it was spoken by 15,000 people, one-third of whom are monolingual, in 13 villages in the vicinity of the town of San Felipe Jalapa de Díaz in the Tuxtepec District of the Mexican state of Oaxaca. A 2016 study, published in 2019, estimated the Mazatec dialects to have 220,000 speakers. Egland (1978) found 73% intelligibility with Huautla, the prestige variety of Mazatec. Literacy in Jalapa is taught alongside Spanish in local schools.

== Phonology ==
Jalapa Mazatec syllables are maximally CCGV. However, vowels distinguish several phonations, and like all Mazatec languages, Jalapa has tone.

=== Consonants ===
Jalapa consonants distinguish (prenasalized) voiced, tenuis, and aspirated plosives, as well as voiceless, voiced, and glottalized sonorants.

		Bilabial	Alveolar		Palatal	Velar		Glottal
		Bilabial	tenuis	palatalized	Palatal	tenuis	labialized	Glottal
Nasal	voiceless	m̥	n̥		ɲ̊	ŋ̊	ŋ̊ʷ	
Nasal	voiced	m	n		ɲ	ŋ	ŋʷ	
Nasal	creaky	m̰	n̰		ɲ̰	ŋ̰	ŋ̰ʷ	
Plosive	aspirated		tʰ	tʲʰ		kʰ	kʷʰ	
Plosive	tenuis		t	tʲ		k	kʷ	ʔ
Plosive	voiced	ᵐb	ⁿd	ⁿdʲ		ᵑɡ	ᵑɡʷ	
Affricate	aspirated		tsʰ		tʃʰ			
Affricate	tenuis		ts		tʃ			
Affricate	voiced		ⁿdz		ᶮdʒ			
Fricative			s		ʃ			h
Approximant	voiceless				j̊		ʍ	
Approximant	voiced				j		w	
Approximant	creaky				j̰		w̰	

There is also a flap, /ɾ/, which only occurs in one morpheme, the clitic =/ɾa/ "probably". In addition, the consonants /p/, /pʰ/, /l/ are found in Spanish loan words.

The labial velars /ʍ w w̰/ become bilabial [ɸ β β̰] before front vowels: [ɸǣ] "it is finished" vs. [ʍā] "John", etc. In the same position, the stop /kʷʰ/ is realized as a heterorganic velar-bilabial affricate [kɸ].

Phonetically aspirated fricatives do not occur before creaky vowels, while aspirated stops do. Therefore, Silverman et al. (1994) treats them as fricative-/h/ clusters.

Silverman (1994:126) remarks that voiced stops are prenasalized in intervocalic position, but later on the same page states that they are prenasalized in initial position. With voiced plosives, the nasalization is two-thirds the duration of the consonant. It is not clear if they ever appear without prenasalization.

Voiceless nasals are voiced for the last quarter of their duration.

Glottalized sonorants are variable in their production. The may occur as a glottal stop followed by a modally voiced sonorant, [ʔm], [ʔj], etc.; an initially creaky voiced sonorant switching to modal voice by the end; a fully creaky consonant; or the creak may extend into the following vowel.

=== Vowels ===
Jalapa Mazatec distinguishes five vowel qualities, discounting phonation: /i/, /æ/, /a/, /o/, /u/. Phonations are modal voice, breathy voice, and creaky voice; all phonations may also occur with the five nasal vowels:

Jalapa Mazatec vowels
Modal voice	i	æ	a	o	u
Breathy voice	i̤	æ̤	a̤	o̤	ṳ
Creaky voice	ḭ	æ̰	a̰	o̰	ṵ
Modal nasal	ĩ	æ̃	ã	õ	ũ
Breathy nasal	ĩ̤	æ̤̃	ã̤	õ̤	ṳ̃
Creaky nasal	ḭ̃	æ̰̃	ã̰	õ̰	ṵ̃

Breathy vowels may have strong breathy voicing throughout their length. However, typically they are voiceless for the first 40% and then have modal voice, so that for example /mæ̤˧˩/ may be pronounced [mæ̤̃˧˩] or [mæ̥̃æ̃˧˩]. Similarly, creaky vowels tend to confine their creakiness to the first part of the vowel, often with glottal closure before modal voice: /sḭ˥/ as [sḭi˥] or [sḭʔi˥].

Jalapa is unique among the Mazatec languages in distinguishing breathy vowels. These arose through the contraction of Proto-Mazatecan disyllables of the form CVhV, where C was voiced and the two vowels were the same. When the two syllables carried different tones, these contracted into a contour. For example, proto-Mazatec *ntʲa˩hu˩ "stone" became /ndʲo̤˩/ (through a presumed intermediate *ndʲo˩ho˩); *ntʃe˨he˦ "thief" became /ndʒæ̤˩˧/; and *ntu˩hwi˩˧ "your soap" became /ndɨ̤ː˩˧/. Similar contractions occurred with CVʔV disyllables to produce creaky vowels, but creaky vowels already existed in the proto-language.

Jalapa also has a phonemic distinction of unclear nature that has been suggested to be "ballisticity". However, it lacks the characteristics of ballistic syllables in other Otomanguean languages. The only consistent distinction Silverman et al. (1994) were able to measure was one of vowel length, with vowels of the alleged ballistic syllables being two-thirds the length of the vowels of the productive open class of nouns, with a slight increase in pitch. They may reflect the original short vowels of proto-Mazatec, as opposed to the vowels of morphologically complex monosyllabic nouns of modern Jalapa Mazatec. If so, Jalapa would have a three-way length distinction, as doubly long vowels are also found in morphologically complex situations. Note that this distinction is not marked in this article apart from this one table:

"ballistic" (short?)	trans.	"controlled" (half long?)	trans.
sū	"warm"	sūˑ	"blue"
nīˑntū	"slippery"	nīˑntūˑ	"needle"
tsǣ	"guava"	tsǣˑ	"full"
hų̄	"y'all"	hų̄ˑ	"six"

=== Tone ===
Jalapa roots distinguish three tones, low ˩, mid ˧, and high ˥. In morphologically complex situations, combinations of these may form short (or perhaps mid-length) vowels with contour tones: ˩˧, ˧˥, ˥˧, ˧˩, ˥˩, ˩˥˩ have been recorded.

The simple tones are contrasted in /ʃá/ (/ʃa˥/) "work", /ʃā/ (/ʃa˧/) "puma", /ʃà/ (/ʃa˩/) "mould".

In much of the literature, these are written with the numerals 1 (low), 2 (mid), and 3 (high).

Jalapa utilizes whistled speech, where each simple or contour tone is given a whistle pulse.

=== Phonotactics ===
Aspirated consonants do not occur before breathy vowels, and glottalized consonants only occur before modally voiced vowels. Nasal consonants only occur before nasal vowels. Voiced plosives are prenasalized in intervocalic position.

Consonant clusters include NC, where N is a nasal and C is a voiceless plosive or affricate, and SC, where S is a sibilant and C is a tenuis plosive or affricate.

== Grammar ==
Jalapa Mazatec root words are primarily monosyllabic, and the intricate inflectional system is largely subsyllabic (Silverman 1994).

== Sources ==
- Silverman, Daniel; Blankenship, Barbara; Kirk, Paul; Ladefoged, Peter (1995). "Phonetic Structures in Jalapa Mazatec". Anthropological Linguistics. 37 (1). The Trustees of Indiana University: 70–88. JSTOR 30028043.
- Blankenship, Barbara (April 2002). "The time course of nonmodal phonation in vowels". Journal of Phonetics. 30 (2). doi:10.1006/jpho.2001.0155.
- Ventura Lucio, Felix (2006). "La situación sociolingüística de la lengua mazateca de Jalapa de Díaz en 2006" (PDF). In Stephen A. Marlett (ed.). Situaciones sociolingüísticas de lenguas amerindias. Lima: SIL International and Universidad Ricardo Palma.
