= Soyaltepec Mazatec =

Mazatecan language of Oaxaca, Mexico

- (San Miguel Soyaltepec); Temascal Mazatec
- Native to: Oaxaca, Mexico
- Region: San Felipe Jalapa de Díaz
- Native speakers: (28,000 cited 2000)
- Language family: Oto-Manguean: Popolocan; Mazatecan; Lowland; Valley; Northern; Soyaltepec Mazatec

Language codes
- ISO 639-3: vmp
- Glottolog: soya1237

Soyaltepec Mazatec is a Mazatecan language spoken in the Mexican state of Oaxaca, notably in the towns of Santa María Jacatepec and San Miguel Soyaltepec, and on Soyaltepec Island.

Due to flooding from the construction of a dam, the Soyaltepec-speaking area has had an influx of speakers of other Mazatecan languages. Perhaps only 900 people, mostly monolingual, still speak the original variety of Soyaltepec.

See Mazatecan languages for a detailed description of these languages.

== Phonology ==
=== Vowels ===
The Soyaltepec Mazatec dialect contains five vowel sounds and nasals:

| | Front | Back |
|---|---|---|
| Close | i, ĩ | u, ũ |
| Mid | ɛ, ɛ̃ | o, õ |
| Open | a, ã | |

=== Consonants ===
| | Labial | Dental | Alveolar | Palatal | Velar | Glottal |
|---|---|---|---|---|---|---|
| Plosive | (p) | t̪ | | | k | ʔ |
| Affricate | | | t͡s | t͡ʃ | | |
| Fricative | f | | s | ʃ | | h |
| Nasal | m | | n | ɲ | | |
| Rhotic | | | ɾ | | | |
| Approximant | w | | l | j | | |

Glottal-sonorant consonants: /hm, hn, hɲ, ʔm, ʔn, ʔɲ, ʔw, ʔj/

Nasal-obstruent consonants: /nt, ŋk, nt͡s, nt͡ʃ/

- [p] occurs only in borrowed words.
- /w/ in word-initial positions may also be heard as a voiced fricative [β].
- /ʃ, t͡ʃ/ may be optionally heard as retroflex [ʂ, t͡ʂ] before a back vowel.
- Glottal-sonorant consonants /hm, hn, hɲ/ are articulated as voiceless nasal sounds [m̥, n̥, ɲ̊] when in surface form.
- Nasal-obstruent articulated consonants may also be heard as voiced [nd, ŋɡ, nd͡z, nd͡ʒ].
