= Chiquihuitlán Mazatec =

Mazatec variety of Mexico

- nne nangui ngaxni
- Native to: Mexico
- Region: Chiquihuitlán de Benito Juárez, Oaxaca
- Native speakers: 1,502 (2010); 340 monolinguals (1990 census)
- Language family: Oto-Manguean: Popolocan; Mazatecan; Chiquihuitlán Mazatec

Language codes
- ISO 639-3: maq
- Glottolog: chiq1250
- ELP: Chiquihuitlán Mazatec

Chiquihuitlán (endonym: nne nangui ngaxni [nẽ nãŋgi ŋgaʃnĩ]) is the most divergent variety of Mazatec, 47% intelligible with Huautla, the prestige variety, and even less intelligible with other Mazatecan languages. It's centered around the municipality of Chiquihuitlán de Benito Juárez, Oaxaca. In 2010, 1,502 total speakers were identified. In 2020, Chiquihuitlán de Benito Juárez had a population of 2,179, of which 1,042 were Mazatec speakers. Chiquihuitlán is spoken in an area that overlaps with Mixtec and Cuicatec speakers.

== Background ==
Chiquihuitlán Mazatec is an endangered language with only around 1,500 native speakers today. This language is native to the Northern part of Oaxaca, Mexico. It is also part of the Oto-Manguean languages, a family of languages native to the Americas.

== Orthography ==
Chiquihuitlán uses the same alphabet as Spanish, with some differences:

a b c ch d e ë f g h i j k l ll m n ñ o p q r s t u v w x y z

The letters ⟨p⟩, ⟨b⟩, ⟨k⟩, z⟩, ⟨w⟩, and ⟨ll⟩ are only used in words from Spanish.

⟨ë⟩ represents /æ/, though some publications use ⟨ä⟩.

⟨j⟩ represents /h/.

⟨h⟩ is /ʔ/, but some older publications may use ⟨?⟩ for the glottal stop.

The digraphs ⟨ty⟩ and ⟨cy⟩ both represent /c/.

⟨q⟩ is only used in the digraph ⟨qu⟩ to represent /k/ in front of ⟨i⟩ or ⟨e⟩.

⟨x⟩ represents /ʃ/.

Chiquihuitlán Mazatec is a tonal language, but tone generally isn't marked in writing. However, if one or more words are spelt the same and the only way to differentiate them is through tone, then the tones are marked. In these cases the word with the higher tone has a vowel with an accent mark next to the stressed syllable. The stressed syllable coincides with the highest tone in a word. In words where the syllables have equal tone, the first syllable is marked. If ⟨ë⟩ needs to be accented, it is written as ⟨ê⟩.

Practical writing systems will write the tone number after the syllable, which can either appear plainly or as a superscript. Dictionary entries will write the word without accent marks, but the tone numbers next to the word (ex. hani 3-1 "red", cjuajeya 4-3-34 "peace").

== Phonology ==
Chiquihuitlán Mazatec has fifthteen consonants: five plosives, two fricatives, six sonorants, and two laryngeals. All consonants are normally realized with spread lips except preceding /o, u/, when they are realized with slight to definite rounding. Like other Oto-Manguean languages, it's also tonal with 4 level tones (high /^{1}/, mid /^{2}/, low-mid /^{3}/, low /^{4}/) and 11 contrast tones.

=== Consonants ===
	Bilabial	Alveolar	Palatal	Velar	Glottal				
	Bilabial	Alveolar	Palatal	Velar	Glottal	Nasal	m	n	ɲ
Plosive		t	t^{j}	k	ʔ				
Affricate		ts	tʃ						
Fricative	β	s	ʃ		h				
Approximant			ʝ						
Flap		ɾ							

Chiquihuitlán Mazatec consonants have several allophones.

All plosive consonants are voiceless except following a nasal, resulting in the following allophones:

- të /tæ^{3}/ "ten" vs ndë /ndæ^{4}/ "step"
- natya /nã^{4}ca^{2}/ "saliva" vs nandya /nã^{4}ɲɟa^{4}/
- vaqui /βa^{3}ki^{3}/ "mom" vs vangui /βaŋ^{3}gi^{3}/ " he searches"
- tsa /tsa^{4}/ "cheek" vs ntsa /ndza^{3}/ "my hand"
- chacun /tʃa^{3}kũ^{34}/ "elegant" vs nchacun /ɲdʒa^{3}kũ^{34}/ "godparents"

In addition /n/ assimilates in point of articulation to a following plosive: na /nã^{4}/ "she, woman", ña /ɲã^{3}/ "even", ngu /ŋgu^{2}/ "one", ndya /ɲɟa^{34}/ "there."

When /h/ precedes /β/, they become /p/ (hvë /pæ^{3}/ "gets used up"), /β/ also becomes slightly nasalized when preceding a nasalized vowel (hvin /ʔβ̃ĩ^{21}/ "he doesn't know").

The voiced alveolar flap ⟨r⟩ becomes voiceless preceding /k/ and becomes a lateral when word-initial preceding a vowel.

=== Vowels ===
	Front		Central	Back
Close	i	y		u
Mid	e			o
Open	æ		a	

== Language revitalization ==
There has been an undergoing effort to gather as much information about the language as possible. Usually the group of people that speak this language is relatively small, and are forced to leave their native language and adopt the language with the greatest possibility of communication. An effort to help people keep their native language while learning Spanish are those undergone by teacher Gloria Ruiz de Bravo Abuja that created the institution Instituto de Investigación e Integración Social del Estado de Oaxaca en 1969. Another program is Archivo de lenguas indígenas del estate de Oaxaca which publishes promising findings in a series of linguistic schemes.
