= Chocho people =

Chochos (Ngiwa)
Total population
- ?

Regions with significant populations
- Oaxaca: ?

Languages
- Spanish, Chocho

Religion
- Catholicism

The Chochos (formerly Chochones; Chocho: Ngiwa) are an Indigenous people of the Mexican state of Oaxaca. The Chocho name for themselves is Ngiwa. The Spanish and English names "Chochos" and "Chochones" are derived from the Nahuatl exonym Chochon (plural Chochontin). The Mixtec term for the Chochos is tay tocuii (also spelled tocuij or tocuiy).

== Language ==
Their traditional language, Chocho, is a member of the Popolocan branch of the Oto-Manguean language family. In 1998 it had 770 speakers. Chochos also speak Spanish, the dominant language of Mexico.
