= Bilabial nasal (disambiguation) =

A bilabial nasal is a speech sound, but the term is ambiguous and can refer to the following:

- Voiceless bilabial nasal [m̥]
- Voiced bilabial nasal [m]
