= Alveolar nasal (disambiguation) =

An alveolar nasal is a speech sound, but the term is ambiguous and can refer to the following:

- Voiceless alveolar nasal [n̥]
- Voiced alveolar nasal [n]
