= Mazatlán (disambiguation) =

Mazatlán is the second largest city in the Mexican state of Sinaloa.

Mazatlán may also refer to:

== Languages ==
- Mazatlán Mazatec, a Mazatecan language spoken in the Mexican state of Oaxaca

== Places ==
- Mazatlán Municipality, municipality in Sinaloa
- Mazatlán Villa de Flores, town and municipality in Oaxaca
- San Juan Mazatlán, town and municipality in Oaxaca

== Sports ==
- Mazatlán F.C., football team
