= Ayautla Mazatec =

Mazatecan language of Mexico

- (San Bartolomé Ayautla)
- Native to: Mexico
- Region: Oaxaca
- Native speakers: 3,700 (2005 census); 2,800 monolingual
- Language family: Oto-Manguean: Popolocan; Mazatecan; Highland; Western; Ayautla Mazatec

Language codes
- ISO 639-3: vmy
- Glottolog: ayau1235

Ayautla Mazatec is a Mazatecan language spoken in the Mexican state of Oaxaca, in the town of San Bartolomé Ayautla. Egland (1978) found 80% intelligibility with Huautla, the prestige variety of Mazatec.

See Mazatecan languages for a detailed description of these languages.
