= Ixcatecos =

Ethnic group in Mexico

The Ixcatec people are a native ethnic minority in Mexico. The Ixcatec community is centered in Santa María Ixcatlán (Njani Male Xula), Oaxaca, which is within the Tehuacán-Cuicatlán Biosphere Reserve.

The desertification of the zone and two pandemics, one in colonial times, have been devastating to Ixcateco populations.

The Ixcatecos' main economic activities include subsistence farming, which includes corn, beans, and wheat on rainfed land, goat farming, mezcal production during the dry season, marketing of palm and palm-woven hats and other articles, and seasonal employment outside the municipality.

The Ixcatecans are renowned for their excellent weaving of white palm leaves (tjen). This is an important commercial activity and tradition within Ixcatecan culture. They make hats, mats, tents, tortilla makers, and also roofs for homes. In the patio of every Ixcatecan house, there is a space they call cueva—a vault-like cavity dug out of the earth, resembling a cave, where the palm leaves are placed for a full day or a day and a half to allow them to soften and acquire moisture. Once the palm is finished, it is used for weaving. Without this process, the palm tree breaks easily, making it difficult to weave.

An activity that the Ixcatecans have carried out for hundreds of years is the preparation and production of mezcal.

== Name ==
Ixcatec is an exonym. In Xwja, they call themselves Xuani or Xula.

The Ixcatecos are named after their hometown of Santa María Ixcatlán. The etymology of Ixcatlán derives from the Nahuatl words ixcatl "cotton" and tlan "place of," and means "Place of Cotton." It is believed that cotton was grown in ancient times and was offered to the Mexica.

== Language ==
Their traditional language is the Ixcatec language (Xwja), a language of the Oto-Manguean linguistic family of the Popolocan branch that is directly related to the Mazatec language. This language is in danger of extinction.
