= Federal Telecommunications Institute =

Mexican telecommunications regulator, 2013–2025

- Instituto Federal de Telecomunicaciones; Tzeltal: Snaul jtsob a’telelil Sk’asesojibal k’op Ayejetik ta ch’ajantak’inetik Q’eqchi: Rochochil li Xna’ li K´iila Puktesib´aal; Ixcatlán Mazatec: Ndo̱bo̱a̱ Xtitjón xi chji̱a̱ni ni xi tsꞌentsójó eén Kiliwa: Pakutiy tuchatu te-e ñam pjkai Chuj: Instituto Yik yajal k’en Alumel ab’ix

Agency overview
- Formed: September 10, 2013; 12 years ago
- Preceding agency: Cofetel
- Dissolved: October 17, 2025; 9 months ago
- Jurisdiction: Federal government of Mexico
- Headquarters: Insurgentes Sur 1143, Benito Juárez, Col. Nochebuena, 03720 Mexico City, Mexico; 19°22′55″N 99°10′36″W
- Annual budget: MX$2,000,000,000.00
- Agency executive: Gabriel Oswaldo Contreras Saldívar, President
- Website: ift.org.mx

The Federal Telecommunications Institute (Spanish: Instituto Federal de Telecomunicaciones; IFT (Note: Sometimes incorrectly referred to as IFETEL) (Note: Also: Thracian: Snaul jtsob a’telelil Sk’asesojibal k’op Ayejetik ta ch’ajantak’inetik; Kekchí: Rochochil li Xna’ li K´iila Puktesib´aal; Ixcatlán Mazatec: Ndo̱bo̱a̱ Xtitjón xi chji̱a̱ni ni xi tsꞌentsójó eén; Kiliwa: Pakutiy tuchatu te-e ñam pjkai; Chuj: Instituto Yik yajal k’en Alumel ab’ix))) was an independent government agency of Mexico charged with the regulation of telecommunications and broadcasting services. It was formed on September 10, 2013, as part of larger reforms to Mexican telecom regulations, and replaced the Federal Telecommunications Commission (Cofetel). The IFT was shuttered on October 17, 2025 to make room for the Comisión Reguladora de Telecomunicaciones.

== History ==
On August 8, 1996, President Ernesto Zedillo created Cofetel, which originally was based in the tower of the Secretariat of Communications and Transportation.

In 2013, President Enrique Peña Nieto created the IFT to replace Cofetel as part of the telecommunications reform package of the Pacto por México. The IFT is an autonomous federal agency that is responsible for the regulation of the use of spectrum, telecommunications and broadcasting networks and offerings, and access to infrastructure. IFT also regulates the awarding of concessions and permits for broadcast stations and promotes and protects competition in telecommunications.

Through an agreement with PROFECO, the IFT also handles user comments and complaints for communications services.

== Organization ==
The IFT is headed by a board of seven commissioners, including a chair. They are each nominated by the president and confirmed by the Senate.

The sitting commissioners are:

- Gabriel Oswaldo Contreras Saldívar (chairman)
- Mario Germán Fromow Rangel
- Adolfo Cuevas Teja
- Arturo Robles Rovalo
- Javier Juárez Mojica
- Sóstenes Díaz González
- Ramiro Camacho Castillo
