= Ixcatlán Mazatec =

Mazatecan language of Oaxaca, Mexico

- (San Pedro Ixcatlán)
- Native to: Mexico
- Region: Oaxaca
- Native speakers: (8,600 cited 2000)
- Language family: Oto-Manguean: Popolocan; Mazatecan; Lowland; Valley; Northern; Ixcatlán Mazatec

Language codes
- ISO 639-3: mzi
- Glottolog: ixca1246

Ixcatlán Mazatec is a Mazatecan language spoken in the Mexican state of Oaxaca, notably in the towns of Chichicazapa, Nuevo Ixcatlán, and San Pedro Ixcatlán. Egland (1978) found 76% intelligibility with Huautla, the prestige variety of Mazatec.

== Phonology ==
=== Vowels ===
Ixcatlán Mazatec has the following vowel phonemes:

| | Front | | Back | |
| | oral | nasal | oral | nasal |
|---|---|---|---|---|
| Close | i | ĩ | o | õ |
| Open | e | ẽ | a | ã |

- There are no diphthongs, long vowels or vowels with non-modal phonation.

=== Consonants ===
Ixcatlán Mazatec has the following consonant phonemes:

| | | Bilabial | | Alveolar | | Post- alveolar | | Palatal | | | | Velar | | | Glottal |
| | | Bilabial | | Alveolar | | Post- alveolar | | coronal | | dorsal | | Velar | | | Glottal |
| | | plain | pren. | plain | pren. | plain | pren. | plain | pren. | plain | pren. | plain | pren. | labial | Glottal |
|---|---|---|---|---|---|---|---|---|---|---|---|---|---|---|---|
| Plosive | tenuis | (p) | (ᵐb) | t | ⁿd | | | tʲ | ⁿdʲ | kʲ | | k | ᵑg | kʷ | ʔ |
| Plosive | aspirated | (pʰ) | | tʰ | (ⁿtʰ) | | | tʲʰ | (ⁿtʲʰ) | kʲʰ | | kʰ | (ᵑkʰ) | kʷʰ | |
| Plosive | glottalic | | | tˀ | (ⁿtˀ) | | | tʲˀ | (ⁿtʲˀ) | kʲˀ | (ᵑkʲˀ) | kˀ | (ᵑkˀ) | kʷˀ | |
| Affricate | tenuis | | | ts | ⁿdz | tʃ | ⁿdʒ | tsʲ | ⁿdzʲ | | | | | | |
| Affricate | aspirated | | | tsʰ | (ⁿtsʰ) | tʃʰ | (ⁿtʃʰ) | tsʲʰ | (ⁿtsʲʰ) | | | | | | |
| Affricate | glottalic | | | tsˀ | (ⁿtsˀ) | tʃˀ | (ⁿtʃˀ) | tsʲˀ | (ⁿtsʲˀ) | | | | | | |
| Fricative | plain | ɸ | | s | | ʃ | | sʲ | | | | | | | h |
| Fricative | glottalic | | | sˀ | | ʃˀ | | sʲˀ | | | | | | | |
| Nasal | modal | m | | n | | | | ɲ | | | | | | | |
| Nasal | breathy | m̤ | | n̤ | | | | ɲ̤ | | | | | | | |
| Nasal | creaky | m̰ | | n̰ | | | | ɲ̰ | | | | | | | |
| Approximant | plain | β | | (l) | | | | j | | | | | | | |
| Approximant | glottalic | β̰ | | | | | | j̰ | | | | | | | |
| Vibrant | tap | | | ɾ | | | | | | | | | | | |
| Vibrant | trill | | | (r) | | | | | | | | | | | |

- /tʲ, sʲ, kʲ/ [t̠, ɕ, c]
- /ɲ/ [ɲ ~ nʲ]

== See also ==
- Mazatecan languages

== Bibliography ==
- Wagner Oviedo, Carlos de Jesús (2018). Xi kó ts’en fañe ‘én ni̱ngo̱tsie: Fonología segmental y tonal del mazateco de Ixcatlán (Licenciatura en Lingüística). Mexico City: Escuela Nacional de Antropología e Historia. doi:10.13140/RG.2.2.15539.86568.
