= Chocho language =

Popolocan language spoken in Mexico

Chocho
- Chochotec
- Ngigua (Ngiwa)
- Native to: Mexico
- Region: Oaxaca
- Ethnicity: Chochos
- Native speakers: 850 (2020 census)
- Language family: Oto-Manguean: Popolocan; Chocho–Popoloca; Chocho

Language codes
- ISO 639-3: coz
- Glottolog: choc1279
- ELP: Chocho
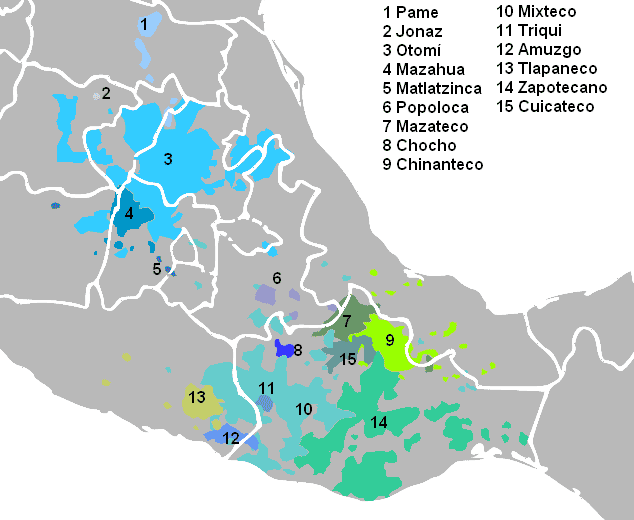
- The Chocho language, number 8 (dark blue), center

Chocho (also Chocholtec, Chocholteco Chochotec, Chochon, or Ngigua) is a language of the Popolocan branch of the Oto-Manguean language family spoken in Mexico. Chocho is spoken by 770 speakers (1998 Ethnologue Survey).

== Geographical distribution ==
Chocho is spoken in the following communities of Oaxaca: San Miguel Chicahua (settlement of Llano Seco), Teotongo (settlements of El Progreso, El Tecomate, Guadalupe, and La Luz), San Miguel Huautla (settlement of Ocotlán), Santa Magdalena Jicotlán (settlements of San Mateo Tlapiltepec, and Santiago Tepetlapa), San Pedro Nopala (settlements of San Mateo Tlapiltepec, and Santa María Jicotlán), San Miguel Tequixtepec (settlement of Los Batos), San Francisco Teopan (settlements of Concepción Buenavista, Santiago Ihuitlán Plumas, Tepelmeme Villa de Morelos, and Tlacotepec Plumas), Ocotlán (settlements of Boquerón, San Antonio Nduayaco, Tierra Colorada, and Unión Palo Solo), Santa María Nativitas (settlements of Barrio Nicolás, Barrio Santiago, El Mirador, El Porvenir, Loma del Tepejillo, Pie del Cordoncillo, Primera Sección (Santa Cruz), San José Monte Verde, San Pedro Buenavista, and Santa María Nativitas), San Juan Bautista Coixtlahuaca (settlements of El Capulín (Sección Primera), El Tepozón (Sección Segunda), El Zapotal (Sección Tercera), La Mulata, and Santa Catarina Ocotlán), and San Miguel Tulancingo (settlements of Agua Dulce, Buena Vista, El Coatillo, El Español, Gasucho, Loma Larga, Rancho Marino Sánchez, and San Miguel Tulancingo).

== Phonology ==
=== Consonants ===
		Labial	Dental	Alveolar		Post- alveolar	Retroflex	Palatal	Velar	Glottal
Nasal	voiced	m		n				ɲ		
Nasal	voiceless	m̥		n̥						
Plosive	voiceless	p	t					c	k	ʔ
Plosive	voiced	b	d					ɟ	ɡ	
Affricate				t͡s		t͡ʃ	t͡ʂ			
Fricative	voiceless	f	θ	s		ʃ	ʂ		x	
Fricative	voiced	β	ð	z		ʒ	ʐ		ɣ	
Rhotic				ɾ	r		ɽ			
Lateral				l						
Approximant		w						j		

=== Vowels ===
Oral vowels
	Front	Central	Back
Close	i, ĩ		u, ũ
Mid	e, ẽ		o, õ
Open		a, ã	

- Vowel sounds /a e i/ can have lax allophones of [ɑ ɛ ɪ].

Laryngealized vowels
	Front	Central	Back
Close	ḭ, ḭ̃		ṵ, ṵ̃
Mid	ḛ, ḛ̃		o̰, õ̰
Open		a̰, ã̰	

Glottalized vowels
	Front	Central	Back
Close	iʔ, ĩʔ		uʔ, ũʔ
Mid	eʔ, ẽʔ		oʔ, õʔ
Open		aʔ, ãʔ	

=== Tone ===
Chocho is a tonal language distinguishing low, mid and high tones.

== Grammar ==
Carol Mock (1982) argues that Chocho distinguishes morphosyntactically between subjects of willful actions whether they are transitive or intransitive and subjects of unwillful actions. This results in her analysing Chocho as an active–stative language.

As an example of how this works here is an example showing that the subject is marked with a different suffix depending on whether the action of the verb is active or inactive

In an active/voluntary transitive phrase the agent/subject is marked by the active suffix "-á" and the patient by the inactive clitic "-mī". The patient/subject of an intransitive active/voluntary phrase is marked by the same suffix.

bì- kų̄ -ámī
ASP- see -1.EXCL.ACT/2.INFORM.INACT
"I saw you"

d- àsǭ -á
ASP- arrive -1.EXCL.ACT
"I arrive"

However in an involuntary/inactive intransitive phrase the subject/patient is marked with the inactive clitic "má" like an object/patient of a transitive phrase.

d- ą́tʰē -má
ASP- fall -1.EXCL.ACT
"I fall"

This morphosyntactic alignment would imply Chocho is a Split-S type active language. However, some intransitive verbs can use either the active person suffixes or the inactive enclitic, this suggests that it does in fact belong to the Fluid-S type active language.
