= Telecommunications Regulatory Commission =

Mexican telecommunications regulator, 2025–

- Comisión Reguladora de Telecomunicaciones

Agency overview
- Formed: October 17, 2025; 9 months ago
- Preceding agency: IFT
- Jurisdiction: Federal government of Mexico
- Headquarters: Insurgentes Sur 1143, Benito Juárez, Col. Nochebuena, 03720 Mexico City, Mexico; 19°22′55″N 99°10′36″W
- Agency executive: Norma Solano Rodríguez, President
- Website: www.gob.mx/crt

The Telecommunications Regulatory Commission (Spanish: Comisión Reguladora de Telecomunicaciones; CRT) is the regulatory body responsible for regulating the telecommunications and broadcasting industries in Mexico. It was formed in 2025 as the successor to the Federal Telecommunications Institute (Spanish: Instituto Federal de Telecomunicaciones; IFT) and is part of the Agencia de Transformación Digital y Telecomunicaciones.

== History ==
The Federal Telecommunications Institute (IFT), an autonomous agency, faced scrutiny over its performance during the administration of president Andrés Manuel López Obrador. While it had as many as seven commissioners, by 2024 it was left with only three as a result of new commissioners not being nominated by the president. A two-thirds majority of the Chamber of Deputies and Senate of the Republic approved in November 2024 a constitutional amendment to eliminate seven autonomous agencies, including the IFT. The functions of the IFT were transferred to a cabinet secretariat, the Agencia de Transformación Digital y Telecomunicaciones (ATDT).

However, as implementing legislation was produced to effectuate the reform, concern grew that moving telecommunications regulation directly under the ATDT violated the United States–Mexico–Canada Agreement, which required Mexico to have an independent, autonomous telecommunications regulator. As a result, the final version of the Ley en Materia de Telecomunicaciones y Radiodifusión included the creation of the Telecommunications Regulatory Commission (CRT) within the ATDT, with partial independence and a collegial body of five commissioners and removed article 109 in order to avoid violating USMCA. The new telecommunications legislation entered into force on July 17, 2025, but it specified that the CRT would only come into being once its five commissioners had been confirmed by the Senate and President Sheinbaum had selected its chair. One result was that the 2014 and 2025 telecommunications laws were both in effect for a time. Another was that the IFT entered into a lame duck status.

The IFT was legally dissolved on October 17, 2025, upon the confirmation of the CRT's commissioners and naming of its president.

== Commissioners ==
The CRT has five commissioners, one of whom is named as the president. The original commissioners were named to staggered terms of three to seven years, with Solano having the longest term.

- Norma Solano Rodríguez (president)
- Ledenika Mackensie Méndez González
- María de las Mercedes Olivares Tresgallo
- Tania Villa Trápala
- Adán Salazar Garibay
