= Ixcatec language =

Oto-Manguean language of Oaxaca, Mexico

Ixcatec
- Xwja, Xjuani
- Native to: Mexico
- Region: Oaxaca
- Ethnicity: Ixcatecos
- Native speakers: 2 (2025)
- Language family: Oto-Manguean: Popolocan; Ixcatec
- Writing system: Latin

Official status
- Official language in: Mexico
- Regulated by: Instituto Nacional de Lenguas Indígenas

Language codes
- ISO 639-3: ixc
- Glottolog: ixca1245
- ELP: Ixcatec
- Ixcatec is classified as Critically Endangered by the UNESCO Atlas of the World's Languages in Danger.

Ixcatec (in Ixcatec: xwja or xjuani) is a language spoken by the people of the Mexican village of Santa María Ixcatlan, in the northern part of the state of Oaxaca. The Ixcatec language belongs to the Popolocan branch of the Oto-Manguean language family. It is believed to have been the second language to branch off from the others within the Popolocan subgroup, though there is a small debate over the relation it has to them.

According to the Consejo Nacional para la Cultura y las Artes, there were only 8 speakers of the language in 2008. In 2010, 190 speakers of Ixcatec were registered. In 2020, 195 people reported speaking the language. The small number of current speakers is the result of a steady decline over the last 60 years, which can be attributed to anti-illiteracy campaigns by the Mexican government that discouraged the use of indigenous languages, migration from the area to the cities, and the small initial population of speakers of the language.

Despite the lack of historical documentation in Ixcatec, written speech has been observed to use Latin script following the arrival of the Spaniards. The earliest document written in Ixcatec is from 1939, when native speaker Doroteo Jiménez wrote a letter to Lázaro Cárdenas, the president of Mexico from 1934 to 1940. Later on, an orthography for the language had begun development in the 1950s with reliance on the Spanish alphabet when necessary.

Ixcatec derives its name from the Nahuatl word ichcatl meaning 'cotton'. In Spanish it can be referred to by the term ixcateco, in which the added on suffix -teco stems from the Nahuatl suffixes -teca/-tecatl which means 'inhabitant of a place', especially one with a name ending in -tlan or -lan. This term can be traced back to the eighteenth century.

== Classification ==
The Ixcatec language belongs to the Oto-Manguean language family, and to the Popolocan branch. The closest languages to Ixcatec, genetically speaking, are Mazatec, Chocholtec and Popolocan.

== Characteristics ==
Like other Oto-Manguean languages, Ixcatec is a tonal language and it distinguishes between long and short vowels. Due to the low number of speakers, Ixcatec is considered a language with a high risk of disappearing.

== Phonology ==
=== Consonants ===
The following table presents the consonants of Ixcatec. Plosives can be voiceless or voiced (the second row contains the voiceless plosives while the third contains the voiced ones) as well as affricates. The voiceless bilabial stop /p/ and the trill /rr/ are the only consonants to be borrowed from Spanish (though there is only one case in which /p/ possibly was not: ʔu^{2}ča^{1}pi^{1} [ʔu^{2}ša^{1}pi^{1}] 'cenzontle'.

Ixcatec Consonants
		Labial	Dental	Alveolar	Alveopalatal	Velar	Glottal
Plosive	voiceless	p	t	tʲ ⟨ť̌⟩ (Note: /tʲ/ and /tʲh/ appear only before the vowels /u/ and /ũ/.)		k	ʔ (Note: /ʔ/ always appears word-initially before a vowel, in a middle position between them, or forming a part of a consonant cluster.)
Plosive	voiced	b	d	dʲ ⟨ď̌⟩ (Note: The voiced consonants /d͡ʒ/ and /dʲ/ are always preceded by the nasal /n/ and almost always by /g/.)		ɡ	
Fricative		f (Note: The voiceless labiodental fricative /f/ occurs in a few verb forms where it is preceded by a slight velar stop [^{k}f].)		s	ʃ ⟨š⟩ (Note: [ʃ] is pronounced as retroflex [ʂ] when it is directly before a vowel, but elsewhere it is palatalized [ʃ].)	x (Note: /x/, a voiceless velar fricative, is anterior before an /i/ or /e/ and slightly posterior before an /o/ or /u/.)	h
Affricate	voiceless			t͡s ⟨c⟩	t͡ʃ ⟨č⟩		
Affricate	voiced				d͡ʒ ⟨ǯ⟩		
Nasal		m	n (Note: /n/ becomes velarized [ŋ] before a /g/.)		ɲ ⟨ñ⟩		
Approximant (Note: The approximants have a limited distribution: /w/ does not occur in a word-initial position and /j/ is similar in a few cases.)		w			j ⟨y⟩		
Lateral				l			
Rhotic	trill			r ⟨rr⟩ (Note: While /r/ has once been classified as a voiced alveolar flap [ɾ], /r/ can also be classified as a voiced alveolar trill [r], usually denoted with /rr/. However, Veerman (2001) argues that there is no phonemic contrast between the two.)			
Rhotic	flap			ɾ ⟨r⟩			

Most consonant groupings contain one of the following consonants: /ʔ/, /h/, and /n/. /ʔ/ and /h/ occur in the final position of a grouping, but precede nasals and /j/ whereas /n/ usually precedes a voiced consonant: /mb/, /nd/, /nd͡ʒ/, /ŋg/, etc.

=== Vowels ===
There are five oral and five nasal vowels in the Ixcatec inventory. The following table presents the pairs of vowels with the oral one preceding the nasalized version.

	Front		Central		Back	
	oral	nasal	oral	nasal	oral	nasal
Close	i	ĩ			u	ũ
Mid	e	ẽ			o	õ
Open			a	ã		

Vowels are grouped into diphthongs or non-diphthongs. A diphthong contains the vowel /i/ or /u/ (or their nasal counterparts) followed by a different vowel. However, both components of the diphthong must have the same manner of articulation (oral or nasal). Diphthongs generally appear in inflectional forms of stems ending in /i/ or /u/, or their nasalized versions, and are represented with one tone.

Additionally, vowels can be distinguished by length. A long vowel is composed of two of the same vowels with identical tones. It is represented with two vowels and a single tone (e.g. cee^{2} 'do', ce^{2} 'moss'). A word-final long vowel can also be the result of suffixation. For example, the word ra^{2}te^{3} 'sandal' followed by the suffix that indicates third-person possession creates ra^{2}tee^{3} 'his/her sandal'.

=== Phonological alternations ===
A change in context influences the sound of the consonant /h/. /h/ is pronounced as a glottal fricative [h] in a nasal context and when it is near a consonant other than [r]. Some examples include thi^{2} 'cane' [thi^{2}] and nĩ^{1}he˜^{2} 'three' [nĩ^{1}he˜^{2}]. However, in an oral context and when following an /r/, it becomes velarized, as is the case with si^{1}hi^{3} 'foot' [si^{1}xi^{3}].

=== Tone ===
There are three tones in Ixcatec. They are represented by superscript numbers following vowels, which are the main carriers of tone. They are as follows: ^{1} indicates a high tone, ^{2} indicates a medium tone, and ^{3} indicates a low tone. The distinction between tones is greatest between stressed syllables since they lose most of their distinctive value in syllables that precede a stressed one. Tones may undergo changes due to the influence of adjacent tones and morphological processes.

There are nine possible combinations of tones within disyllabic words according to Fernandez (1950):

Disyllabic Tone Combinations
Combination	Example	
1-1	/ tíjé /	ti^{1}ye^{1} 'black'
1-2	/ t͡sútxē /	cu^{1}txe^{2} 'trash'
1-3	/ kwátè /	kwa^{1}te^{3} 'short'
2-1	/ nāʔmí /	na^{2}ʔmi^{1} 'cure'
2-2	/ tʲūsī /	t^{y}u^{2}si^{2} 'lemon'
2-3	/ ʃāxù /	ša^{2}xu^{3} 'dew'
3-1	/ ʃìkéː /	ši^{1}ke^{3}e^{3} 'his/her herb'
3-2	/ jàʃwī /	ya^{3}šwi^{2} 'stick'
3-3	/ kànè /	ka^{3}ne^{3} 'boiled maize dish'

Fernandez (1950) also proposed twenty-six hypothetical combinations of tones within trisyllabic words.

=== Syllable structure ===
The maximal syllable structure in Ixcatec is CCV, where ‹C› represents any consonant. There are no coda consonants, so that words like ť̌u^{2}škũ^{2} /tʲūʃkũ̄/ and u^{2}hñu^{3}/ūhɲù/ are syllabified as /tʲū.ʃkũ̄/ and /ū.hɲù/, respectively. Syllables that begin with a vowel only appear in a non-initial position. The initial consonant can also be the voiceless glottal stop, /ʔ/, but it does not occur when it directly precedes a vowel. V can be a simple vowel, a long vowel, or a diphthong. Disyllabic words are composed of two different tones.

Although stress is difficult to perceive in most words, it is believed that it falls on the penultimate syllable. The stress causes a prolonged articulation, slightly or prominently, on the consonant or group of consonants that follow it. The stress is clearly shown in the inflected forms, where it is displaced as a result of suffixing a syllable of the CVT type. For example, the form of the word ra^{2}te^{3} 'sandal' is pronounced [ra^{2}tte^{3}] with the /t/ slightly lengthened. However, in the form ra^{2}te^{3}ni^{1} 'our sandals', the stress moves towards the penultimate syllable where it is expressed by lengthening the consonant /n/: [ra^{2}te^{3}nni^{1}].

== Morphology ==
=== Processes ===
The most general morphological process in Ixcatec is affixation. However, one known account of complete reduplication occurs when the adjective ʔi^{1} 'small' becomes ʔi^{1}ʔi^{1} when pluralized.

Another morphological process is tonal change. In almost all the verbs and some nouns, tonal change indicates past or future tense.

Past	Future
kwa^{1}te^{3} 'to have cut'	kwa^{3}te^{3} 'to cut'
kwa^{2}cu^{3}ndu^{2} 'night'	kwa^{1}cu^{2}nda^{2} 'night'

When there is a vowel /i/ in the last two syllables of a disyllabic or trisyllabic noun, and the possessive suffixes of the second and third persons are added, the final /i/ becomes lowered and centralized. For example, nǰi^{2}xi^{3} 'pasture' becomes nǰi^{2}xe^{3}e^{3} 'his pasture'.

Regressive assimilation occurs in disyllabic words that have an /a/ in each syllable separated by the glottal stop /ʔ/. To form the possessive of the third person singular and plural, the first vowel assimilates to the one in the suffix. For instance, na^{2}ʔa^{1} 'mother' becomes ne^{2}ʔe^{1}e^{1} 'her mother'.

=== Grammatical persons ===
The nominal phrase has at least a noun or a pronoun that frequently precedes an article and one or more adjectives. The subject of possession is expressed within the noun by the addition of an ending.

There are four inflected forms for the first person, second person, third person, and collective subjects. Personal pronouns are optionally used to emphasize the person of the subject, or to avoid confusion between subjects. The pronouns that correspond to the four grammatical persons are i^{2}na^{1}na^{3} (first person), i^{2}la^{3} (second person), su^{2}wa^{2} (third person), and i^{2}ni^{1} (first person plural).

Respect shown towards a second-person subject is expressed by adding the enclitic ri^{1} to the end of the second-person pronoun: i^{2}la^{3}ri^{1} ('you' formal, equivalent to usted in Spanish). The third-person pronoun is commonly followed by a coreferential pronoun indicating the gender or plurality of the third person. This pronoun corresponds to an antecedent noun: su^{2}wa^{2}da^{3} 'he/him', su^{2}wa^{2}kua^{3} 'she/her', su^{2}wa^{2}ba^{3} 'it' (as with animals), and su^{2}wa^{2}ma^{3} 'them'.

=== Nouns ===
Nouns can be either subjects or sentence complements. Most of the multisyllabic nouns in this language are compounds. The first component is generally a morpheme that classifies the noun in one of various generic classes, which includes trees, animals, flowers, people, etc. These classifying prefixes correspond to nouns with a particular generic class. For instance, the noun u^{2} 'animal' is used as a classifying prefix u^{2}- in the names of animals. The second component of nouns does not have any significant meaning and thus cannot function on its own.

Some nouns that are used most frequently as classifiers in noun compounds are:

	Class	Examples
/u^{2}/, animal	Animals: u^{2}-	u^{2}ni^{2}ña^{3} 'dog' u^{2}hñu^{3} 'turkey'
/yaa^{3}/, tree	Trees and wooden objects: ya^{2}-	ya^{2}nge^{2} 'Encino'
/ ť̌u^{2}/, round object	Fruits and round objects: ť̌u^{2}-	ť̌u^{2}škũ^{2} 'eye'
/chu^{2}/, flower	Flowers: chu^{2}-	chu^{2}ro^{1}sa^{1} 'rose'
/dii^{3}/, man	Men: di^{2}-	di^{2}či^{2}nga^{1} 'a group of men'

=== Possessives ===
Nouns that refer to body parts or kinship require the expression of a possessor, almost always a possessive suffix, while others, such as natural phenomena and wild animals, do not. Nouns express the person of a possessor by adding to their subjects specific suffixes and enclitics. The regular endings of the possessive include -ña na (first person), -aa (second person), -ee (third person), and -ni (first person plural).

There are four inflectional possessive classes apart from a small number of irregular nouns: Class I, Class II, Class III, and Class IV.

==== Class I ====
This class is the largest of the inflectional classes. The endings of nouns in this class generate a high tone in the final vowel of the word. This vowel does not change its quality in the first-person singular and plural forms but produces a reduction of vowels in the second and third-person forms. There are two subclasses, Ia and Ib, which differ only in the ending of the third-person forms.

The endings are:

1st person singular	-ña^{1}na^{3}
2nd person	-a^{1}a^{2}
2nd person (formal)	-aa^{1}ri^{2}
3rd person	-ee^{1} (Ia)/ -ee^{2} (Ib)
1st person plural	-ni^{2}

The majority of the nouns in this class take the endings of Subclass Ia. Monosyllabic nouns in this subclass have a medium tone while the disyllabic ones have a sequence of two medium tones and multisyllabic ones end in a sequence of two medium tones.

==== Class II ====
Tonal raising is not carried out in the nouns of this class. The majority of these nouns end in a low tone, which makes up Subclass IIa, whereas others end in a medium tone, subclass IIb. These conserve the medium tone in all inflectional forms and include monosyllabic as well as multisyllabic names. The formal form of the second-person is followed by the enclitic ri^{1}.

The endings are:

1st person singular	-ña^{1}na^{3}
2nd person	-aa^{3} (IIa) / -a^{2}a^{3} (IIb)
2nd person (formal)	-aa^{3}ri^{1} (IIa) / -a^{2}a^{3}ri^{1} (IIb)
3rd person	-ee^{3} (IIa) / -e^{2}e^{3} (IIb)
1st person plural	-ni^{1}

==== Class III ====
Nouns in this class share certain irregularities in their inflected forms that reveal paradigm shifts by analogy with Subclass IIa. The endings are:

1st person singular	-na^{3} ~ -ña^{1}na^{3}
2nd person	-a^{1}a^{3}
2nd person (formal)	-ri^{1}
3rd person	Ø ~ -ee^{1}
1st person plural	-ni^{2} ~ -i^{1} or -i^{3}

==== Class IV ====
Borrowed terms indicate the person of the possessor with the morphemes of the Ixcatec system. The type of accent that nouns receive in Spanish pronunciation, flat or acute, is diagnostic for its possessed forms in Ixcatec.

Nouns with an accent of plain origin form Subclass IVa. They are pronounced with a high tone in the penultimate syllable and can also be in the final. The tone in syllables that precede a stressed syllable is sub-differentiated and pronounced with a medium or low tone. The endings of Subclass IVa coincide with those of Subclass IIa apart from the endings of the first person singular and plural:

1st person singular	-ña^{2}na^{3}
2nd person	-aa^{3}
2nd person (formal)	-aa^{3}ri^{1}
3rd person	-ee^{3}
1st person plural	-ni^{2}

Nouns that have an acute accent in Spanish comprise Subclass IVb. They have a high tone in the final syllable of the stem while the tone is sub-differentiated in the preceding syllable. The endings of this subclass coincide with Subclass Ia except for the ending of the first person.

Nouns that have an acute accent in Spanish comprise Subclass IVb. They have a high tone in the final syllable of the stem while the tone is sub-differentiated in the preceding syllable. The endings of this subclass coincide with Subclass Ia except for the ending of the first person.

1st person singular	-ña^{2}na^{3}
2nd person	-a^{1}a^{3}
2nd person (formal)	-aa^{1}ri^{2}
3rd person	-ee^{1}
1st person plural	-ni^{2}

=== Plurality ===
The plural expression for personal pronouns is optional, and the same forms are commonly used to reference the singular as well as the plural. For example, to emphasize the plural of the second-person pronoun, different forms of tu^{i}hu^{3}, a verbal root with an inherent meaning of plurality, are added to the original form: i^{2}la^{3}ri^{1}tu^{1}hu^{3}ri^{1} 'you' (formal).

However, when it is expressed in a noun it is only to indicate the plurality of the possessor. The absolute noun expresses number through lexical means with the use of numerals or other adjectives indicating quantity.

Examples
hngu^{2} nǯi^{2}ʔa^{2}	'a house'
u^{1}hu^{2} nǯi^{2}ʔa^{2}	'two houses'
u^{1}ča^{1} nǯi^{2}ʔa^{2}	'many houses'

== Syntax ==
=== The nominal phrase ===
==== Adjectives ====
Nouns and pronouns can go before or after the different classes of adjectives and articles. Adjectives are demonstrative, qualifying, or quantitative. Most adjectives can also be used as adverbs. The order of the nominal phrase is as follows: article, quantitative adjective, noun, demonstrative adjective, and qualifying adjective. Additionally, the particle la^{2} is often found between the noun and its modifier. Its function is seemingly syntactic though its use is optional.

Demonstrative adjectives follow the noun that they describe. The demonstrative rii^{2} indicates a relatively close distance much like the word 'this' whereas raa^{2} indicates a farther distance similar to 'that'.

ya^{2}ši^{1}la^{1} rii^{2}	'this seat'
ya^{2}ši^{1}la^{1} raa^{2}	'that seat'

They often appear in conjunctive and prepositional forms, such as:

šta^{1} raa^{2}	'after that'
nda^{1} raa^{2}	'so that'
nda^{2} me^{1} raa^{2}	'that is'

Quantitative adjectives precede the noun that they are modifying. This class pertains to all adjectives that express a quantitative concept, including numerals.

ku2si2ne2 li1tru1 chĩ2
half liter milk
'half a liter of milk'

či1hngu2 ť̌hĩ2
another day
'another day'

Qualifying adjectives follow the nouns they modify. An adverb, a demonstrative, or the particle la^{2} can be inserted between a noun and a qualifying noun:

šu2wa3 ti1ye1
gourd black
'black gourd'

{ya2 š2} rii2 šhe1
basket that big
'that big basket'

A noun that expresses possession is repeated before an adjective or replaced by the particle la^{2}:

šhu3ni1 šhu3 šhe1
our.cave cave big
'our big cave'

šhua1ni2 la2 šhũ1
our.Language PTCL beautiful
'our beautiful language'

An adjective in predicative function goes before the noun:

ť̌ʔui1 ʔnee1
clean his/her.clothes
'his/her clothes are clean'

The suffix of negation -ʔa^{2}na^{1} follows a predicated adjective, but precedes the enclitic for grammatical person:

si^{1}ʔa^{1}	'you are lazy'
si^{1}ʔa^{2}ʔa^{2}na^{1}	'you are not lazy'
ñu^{1}ma^{1} mi^{2}	'I am poor'
ñu^{1}ma^{1} ʔa^{2}na^{1} mi^{2}	'I am not poor'

==== Articles ====
The definite article sa^{1} or sa^{2} is rarely used and less so when the determination is ambiguous. It is used most often with names of people or nouns that refer to people as well as nouns indicating possession. Additionally, it precedes the noun just like quantitative nouns and can be interchanged with the particle la^{2}. The tone of the determinate article frequently coincides with the first tone of the noun it precedes.

sa2 mi2č ʔa2
'the woman'

pdu2ha3 ndiee1 sa2 ho2se1
puerta his.house the Jose
'the door of Jose's house'

=== Pronouns ===
Coreferential pronouns are used in coreference with a noun, subject or object, mentioned earlier in conversation. They indicate the gender of this noun in third-person forms of the possessive, verb, or the personal pronoun su^{2}wa^{2}.

Each one of the four pronouns is morphologically related to the prefixes for noun classifiers.

Pronoun		Classifier
da^{2}	In names of masculine persons	di^{2}-
kua^{2}	In names of feminine persons	kua^{2}-
ma^{2}	In names of groups of people	mi^{2}-
ba^{2}	In names of animals	u^{2}-

Third-person pronouns are formed by placing the personal pronoun before the coreferential pronouns:

su^{2}wa^{2} da^{3}	'he'
su^{2}wa^{2} kua^{3}	'she'
su^{2}wa^{2} ba^{3}	'it' (animal)
su^{2}wa^{2} ma^{3}	'them'

=== Verbs ===
Ixcatec is a head-marking language with arguments of transitive and intransitive verbs being marked by various suffixes. Word order is SV when unmarked. Subject arguments precede the verb in main clauses whereas adverbial clauses cause them to follow the verb instead with a cross-reference suffix attached to the verb. However, word order for mono-transitive main clauses is strictly SVO.

Verbs can be inflected for grammatical persons and number by means of suffixes attached to stem words.

Suffix	Person	Examples
-na^{3}	First (singular)	šte^{2}na^{3} 'I dance' ba^{2}ka^{2}na^{2} 'I jump'
-i^{1}	First (plural)	šti^{1} 'we dance' ba^{2}ki^{1} 'we jump'
-ri^{2}	Second (singular; formal)	šte^{2}ri^{2} 'you dance' ba^{2}ka^{2}ri^{1} 'you jump'
-ma^{3}	Third (plural)	šte^{1}ma^{3} 'they dance' ba^{2}ka^{2}ma^{2} 'they jump'

The prefixes ba^{2}tu^{2}- and kwa^{1}tu^{2}- represent present and past tense and are distinct in the third-person plural form:

ba^{2}tu^{2}ba^{2}ne^{2}	'they eat'
kwa^{1}tu^{2}ba^{2}ne^{2}	'they ate'

In interrogatives forms there are affixes indicating person as well:

bu^{2}- (second-person plural; formal)	nda^{1}ču^{2} bu^{2}šte^{2}	'Why did you dance?'
bu^{2}- (second-person plural; formal)	nda^{1}ču^{2} bu^{2}ba^{2}ka^{2}	'Why did you jump?'

In past and future tenses, the prefix ku- can be used with different versions of its spelling corresponding to the initial phoneme of the verb. Another prefix is xw-.

pi^{2}na^{3}	'I go'
xwi^{2}na^{3}	'I went'
xwi^{1}na^{3}	'I will go'

== Vocabulary ==
=== Numbers ===
- /hngu²/: one
- /ju¹hu¹/: two
- /nĩ¹hẽ²/: three
- /njũ¹hũ¹/: four
- /ʃʔõ¹/: five
- /ʃhõ³/: six
- /ja¹tu²/: seven
- /hni²/: eight
- /nĩ¹njẽ²/: nine
- /ʔu²te³/: ten

=== Interrogatives ===
Frequently used pronoun interrogatives almost always contain a variation of the consonant clusters ndi- or nda-:

Interrogatives
ndi^{2}ra^{2}	'where'
nda^{1}ra^{2}	'what'
ndi^{2}sa^{1}	'when'
nda^{2}cu^{1}	'why'
nde^{2}de^{1}	'how/what'
nda^{2}na^{1}ra^{2} ~ ya^{2}ra^{2}	'who'
