= Mazatlán Mazatec =

Mazatecan language of Oaxaca, Mexico

- Mazatlán Villa de Flores mazateco de Mazatlán
- Íénná
- Native to: Mexico
- Region: Oaxaca
- Native speakers: (12,000 cited 2000)
- Language family: Oto-Manguean: Popolocan; Mazatecan; Lowland; Valley; Southern; Mazatlán Mazatec

Language codes
- ISO 639-3: vmz
- Glottolog: maza1296

Mazatlán Mazatec, known by its speakers as Íénná, is a Mazatecan language spoken in the Mexican state of Oaxaca, in the town of Mazatlán Villa de Flores. Egland (1978) found 80% intelligibility with Tecóatl and 78% with Huautla, the prestige variety of Mazatec.
