= Chiquihuitlán de Benito Juárez =

Coordinates: 17.9944°N 96.7444°W

- municipality and town
- Location in Mexico
- Country: Mexico
- State: Oaxaca

Area
  - Total: 38.3 km^{2} (14.8 sq mi)

Population (2005)
  - Total: 2,368
- Time zone: UTC-6 (Central Standard Time)

Chiquihuitlán de Benito Juárez is a town and municipality in Oaxaca in south-western Mexico. The municipality covers an area of 38.3 km^{2}. It is part of Cuicatlán District in the north of the Cañada Region.

As of 2005, the municipality had a total population of 2,368.
