= Voiceless palatal nasal =

Consonantal sound represented by ⟨ɲ̊⟩ in IPA

ɲ̊

Audio sample
- source · help

Encoding
- X-SAMPA: J_0
Image

Voiceless alveolo-palatal nasal

n̠̊ʲ

ɲ̊˖

A voiceless palatal nasal is a type of consonantal sound, used in some spoken languages. The symbols in the International Phonetic Alphabet that represent this sound are ⟨ɲ̊⟩ and ⟨ɲ̥⟩, which are combinations of the letter for the voiced palatal nasal and a diacritic indicating voicelessness.

If distinction is necessary, a voiceless alveolo-palatal nasal may be transcribed as ⟨n̠̊ʲ⟩ (devoiced, retracted and palatalized ⟨n⟩), or ⟨ɲ̟̊ / ɲ̊˖⟩ (devoiced and advanced ⟨ɲ⟩); these are essentially equivalent, since the contact includes both the blade and body (but not the tip) of the tongue. A non-IPA letter ⟨ȵ̊⟩ (devoiced ⟨ȵ⟩, which is an ordinary ⟨n⟩, plus the curl found in the symbols for alveolo-palatal sibilant fricatives ⟨ɕ, ʑ⟩) can also be used.

== Features ==
Sagittal section of a voiceless palatal nasal

Features of a voiceless palatal nasal:

- Its manner of articulation is occlusive, which means it is produced by obstructing airflow in the vocal tract. Because the consonant is also nasal, the blocked airflow is redirected through the nose.
- Its place of articulation is palatal, which means it is articulated with the middle or back part of the tongue raised to the hard palate.
- Its phonation is voiceless, which means it is produced without vibrations of the vocal cords.
- It is a nasal consonant, which means air is exclusively allowed to escape through the nose for nasal stops; otherwise, in addition to through the mouth.
- It is a median consonant, which means it is produced by directing the airstream down the midline of the tongue, rather than to the sides.
- Its airstream mechanism is pulmonic, which means it is articulated by pushing air only with the intercostal muscles and abdominal muscles, as in most speech sounds.

== Occurrence ==
Language		Word	IPA	Meaning	Notes
Baniwa	Hohodene	[ĩːɲ̊ə]		'to eat'	
Burmese		ညှာ/nya:	[ɲ̊à]	'considerate'	
Faroese		einki / onki	[ˈɔɲ̊t͡ʃɪ]	'nothing'	See Faroese phonology
Hmong	White Hmong	𖬗𖬣𖬰 / hnyav	[ɲ̥a˨˦]	'heavy'	Contrasts with voiced /ɲ/. In Green Hmong, it has merged with /ɲ/.
Iaai		[ɲ̊øːk]		'to dedicate'	
Icelandic		banki	[ˈpɑu̯ɲ̊cɪ]	'bank'	See Icelandic phonology
Jalapa Mazatec		hñá	[ɲ̊á]	'brush'	
Xumi	Lower	[ʃɐ̃˦ɲ̟̊ɛ˦]		'clean'	Alveolo-palatal; occurs mostly in loanwords from Tibetan.

== See also ==
- Index of phonetics articles

== Notes ==
Place →	Labial					Coronal										Dorsal					Laryngeal			
Manner ↓	Bilabial		Labiodental		Linguolabial		Dental		Alveolar		Postalveolar		Retroflex		(Alveolo-)palatal		Velar		Uvular		Pharyngeal/epiglottal		Glottal	
Nasal	m̥	m	ɱ̊	ɱ		n̼	n̪̊	n̪	n̥	n	n̠̊	n̠	ɳ̊	ɳ	ɲ̊	ɲ	ŋ̊	ŋ	ɴ̥	ɴ				
Plosive	p	b	p̪	b̪	t̼	d̼	t̪	d̪	t	d			ʈ	ɖ	c	ɟ	k	ɡ	q	ɢ	ʡ		ʔ	
Sibilant affricate							t̪s̪	d̪z̪	ts	dz	t̠ʃ	d̠ʒ	tʂ	dʐ	tɕ	dʑ								
Non-sibilant affricate	pɸ	bβ	p̪f	b̪v			t̪θ	d̪ð	tɹ̝̊	dɹ̝	t̠ɹ̠̊˔	d̠ɹ̠˔			cç	ɟʝ	kx	ɡɣ	qχ	ɢʁ	ʡʜ	ʡʢ	ʔh	
Sibilant fricative							s̪	z̪	s	z	ʃ	ʒ	ʂ	ʐ	ɕ	ʑ								
Non-sibilant fricative	ɸ	β	f	v	θ̼	ð̼	θ	ð	θ̠	ð̠	ɹ̠̊˔	ɹ̠˔	ɻ̊˔	ɻ˔	ç	ʝ	x	ɣ	χ	ʁ	ħ	ʕ	h	ɦ
Approximant		β̞		ʋ				ð̞		ɹ		ɹ̠		ɻ		j		ɰ						˷
Tap/flap		ⱱ̟		ⱱ					ɾ̥	ɾ			ɽ̊	ɽ						ɢ̆		ʡ̆		
Trill	ʙ̥	ʙ							r̥	r		r̠	ɽ̊r̥	ɽr					ʀ̥	ʀ	ʜ	ʢ		
Lateral affricate									tɬ	dɮ			tꞎ	d𝼅	c𝼆	ɟʎ̝	k𝼄	ɡʟ̝						
Lateral fricative							ɬ̪		ɬ	ɮ			ꞎ	𝼅	𝼆	ʎ̝	𝼄	ʟ̝						
Lateral approximant								l̪	l̥	l		l̠	ɭ̊	ɭ	ʎ̥	ʎ	ʟ̥	ʟ		ʟ̠				
Lateral tap/flap									ɺ̥	ɺ			𝼈̊	𝼈		ʎ̆		ʟ̆						

		BL	LD	D	A	PA	RF	P	V	U
Implosive	Voiced	ɓ			ɗ		ᶑ	ʄ	ɠ	ʛ
Implosive	Voiceless	ɓ̥			ɗ̥		ᶑ̊	ʄ̊	ɠ̊	ʛ̥
Ejective	Stop	pʼ			tʼ		ʈʼ	cʼ	kʼ	qʼ
Ejective	Affricate		p̪fʼ	tθʼ	tsʼ	tʃʼ	tʂʼ	tɕʼ	kxʼ	qχʼ
Ejective	Fricative	ɸʼ	fʼ	θʼ	sʼ	ʃʼ	ʂʼ	ɕʼ	xʼ	χʼ
Ejective	Lateral affricate				tɬʼ			c𝼆ʼ	k𝼄ʼ	q𝼄ʼ
Ejective	Lateral fricative				ɬʼ					
Click (top: velar; bottom: uvular)	Tenuis	kʘ qʘ		kǀ qǀ	kǃ qǃ		k𝼊 q𝼊	kǂ qǂ		
Click (top: velar; bottom: uvular)	Voiced	ɡʘ ɢʘ		ɡǀ ɢǀ	ɡǃ ɢǃ		ɡ𝼊 ɢ𝼊	ɡǂ ɢǂ		
Click (top: velar; bottom: uvular)	Nasal	ŋʘ ɴʘ		ŋǀ ɴǀ	ŋǃ ɴǃ		ŋ𝼊 ɴ𝼊	ŋǂ ɴǂ	ʞ	
Click (top: velar; bottom: uvular)	Tenuis lateral				kǁ qǁ					
Click (top: velar; bottom: uvular)	Voiced lateral				ɡǁ ɢǁ					
Click (top: velar; bottom: uvular)	Nasal lateral				ŋǁ ɴǁ					
