= Voiceless bilabial nasal =

Consonantal sound represented by ⟨m̥⟩ in IPA

m̥

m̊
- IPA number: 114+402A

Audio sample
- source · help

Encoding
- X-SAMPA: m_0
- Braille: ⠍ (braille pattern dots-134) ⠠ (braille pattern dots-6) ⠫ (braille pattern dots-1246)

A voiceless bilabial nasal is a type of consonantal sound, used in some spoken languages. The symbol in the International Phonetic Alphabet that represents this sound is ⟨m̥⟩, a combination of the letter for the voiced bilabial nasal and a diacritic indicating voicelessness.

== Features ==
Sagittal section of a voiceless bilabial nasal

Features of a voiceless bilabial nasal:

- Its manner of articulation is occlusive, which means it is produced by obstructing airflow in the vocal tract. Because the consonant is also nasal, the blocked airflow is redirected through the nose.
- Its place of articulation is bilabial, which means it is articulated with both lips.
- Its phonation is voiceless, which means it is produced without vibrations of the vocal cords.
- It is a nasal consonant, which means air is exclusively allowed to escape through the nose for nasal stops; otherwise, in addition to through the mouth.
- Because the sound is not produced with airflow over the tongue, the median–lateral dichotomy does not apply.
- Its airstream mechanism is pulmonic, which means it is articulated by pushing air only with the intercostal muscles and abdominal muscles, as in most speech sounds.

== Occurrence ==
| Language | | Word | IPA | Meaning | Notes |
|---|---|---|---|---|---|
| Aleut | | quhmax̂ | [qum̥aχ] | 'white' | Voiced approximants and nasals may be partly devoiced in contact with a voiceless consonant and at the end of a word. |
| Alutiiq | | keghmarluku | [kəɡm̥aχluku] | 'bite it repeatedly' | Contrasts with voiced /m/. |
| Burmese | | မှား/hma: | [m̥á] | 'false' | |
| Central Alaskan Yup'ik | | pisteḿun | [ˈpistəm̥un] | 'to the servant' | |
| English | RP | stop me | [ˈstɒp͡m̥ mɪ] | stop me | |
| Estonian | | lehm | [ˈlehm̥] | 'cow' | Word-final allophone of /m/ after /t, s, h/. See Estonian phonology |
| French | | rythme | [ʁitm̥ᵊ] | 'rythm' | Pausal allophone of /m/ after voiceless consonants. See French phonology |
| Hmong | White Hmong | 𖬌𖬣𖬵 / Hmoob | [m̥ɔ̃́] | 'Hmong' | Contrasts with voiced /m/. In Green Mong, it has merged with /m/. |
| Icelandic | | kempa | [cʰɛm̥pa] | 'hero' | Allophone of /m/ before fortis plosives. Minimally contrastive with /m/ before voiced plosives: kemba [cʰɛmpa] 'to comb'. See Icelandic phonology |
| Jalapa Mazatec | | hma | [m̥a] | 'black' | Contrasts with a voiced and a laryngealized bilabial nasal. |
| Kildin Sami | | лēӎӎьк/ljeehmhmk | [lʲeːm̥ʲːk] | 'strap' | |
| Muscogee | | cvmhcakv | [t͡ʃəm̥t͡ʃɑ́ˑɡə] | 'bell' | Allophone of /m/ before /h/ when in the same syllable. |
| Northern Sámi | | čáihmi | [ˈt͡ʃaːjːm̥iː] | 'freckle' | |
| Ukrainian | | ритм/rytm | [rɪt̪m̥] | 'rhythm' | Word-final allophone of /m/ after voiceless consonants. See Ukrainian phonology |
| Washo | | Mášdɨmmi | [ˈm̥aʃdɨmmi] | 'he's hiding' | |
| Welsh | | fy mhen | [və m̥ɛn] | 'my head' | Occurs as the nasal mutation of /p/. Often realised as a sequence consisting of a voiced nasal and a variably voiced glottal continuant. See Welsh phonology |
| Xumi | Lower | [m̥ɛ̃˦] | | 'medicine' | Contrasts with the voiced /m/. |
| Xumi | Upper | [m̥ɛ̃˦] | | 'medicine' | Contrasts with the voiced /m/. |
| Yi | | ꂓ hmi | [m̥i] | 'name' | |

== See also ==
- Index of phonetics articles
- Voiced bilabial nasal

== Notes ==
| Place → | Labial | | | | | Coronal | | | | | | | | | | Dorsal | | | | | Laryngeal | | | |
| Manner ↓ | Bilabial | | Labiodental | | Linguolabial | | Dental | | Alveolar | | Postalveolar | | Retroflex | | (Alveolo-)palatal | | Velar | | Uvular | | Pharyngeal/epiglottal | | Glottal | |
|---|---|---|---|---|---|---|---|---|---|---|---|---|---|---|---|---|---|---|---|---|---|---|---|---|
| Nasal | m̥ | m | ɱ̊ | ɱ | | n̼ | n̪̊ | n̪ | n̥ | n | n̠̊ | n̠ | ɳ̊ | ɳ | ɲ̊ | ɲ | ŋ̊ | ŋ | ɴ̥ | ɴ | | | | |
| Plosive | p | b | p̪ | b̪ | t̼ | d̼ | t̪ | d̪ | t | d | | | ʈ | ɖ | c | ɟ | k | ɡ | q | ɢ | ʡ | | ʔ | |
| Sibilant affricate | | | | | | | t̪s̪ | d̪z̪ | ts | dz | t̠ʃ | d̠ʒ | tʂ | dʐ | tɕ | dʑ | | | | | | | | |
| Non-sibilant affricate | pɸ | bβ | p̪f | b̪v | | | t̪θ | d̪ð | tɹ̝̊ | dɹ̝ | t̠ɹ̠̊˔ | d̠ɹ̠˔ | | | cç | ɟʝ | kx | ɡɣ | qχ | ɢʁ | ʡʜ | ʡʢ | ʔh | |
| Sibilant fricative | | | | | | | s̪ | z̪ | s | z | ʃ | ʒ | ʂ | ʐ | ɕ | ʑ | | | | | | | | |
| Non-sibilant fricative | ɸ | β | f | v | θ̼ | ð̼ | θ | ð | θ̠ | ð̠ | ɹ̠̊˔ | ɹ̠˔ | ɻ̊˔ | ɻ˔ | ç | ʝ | x | ɣ | χ | ʁ | ħ | ʕ | h | ɦ |
| Approximant | | β̞ | | ʋ | | | | ð̞ | | ɹ | | ɹ̠ | | ɻ | | j | | ɰ | | | | | | ˷ |
| Tap/flap | | ⱱ̟ | | ⱱ | | | | | ɾ̥ | ɾ | | | ɽ̊ | ɽ | | | | | | ɢ̆ | | ʡ̆ | | |
| Trill | ʙ̥ | ʙ | | | | | | | r̥ | r | | r̠ | ɽ̊r̥ | ɽr | | | | | ʀ̥ | ʀ | ʜ | ʢ | | |
| Lateral affricate | | | | | | | | | tɬ | dɮ | | | tꞎ | d𝼅 | c𝼆 | ɟʎ̝ | k𝼄 | ɡʟ̝ | | | | | | |
| Lateral fricative | | | | | | | ɬ̪ | | ɬ | ɮ | | | ꞎ | 𝼅 | 𝼆 | ʎ̝ | 𝼄 | ʟ̝ | | | | | | |
| Lateral approximant | | | | | | | | l̪ | l̥ | l | | l̠ | ɭ̊ | ɭ | ʎ̥ | ʎ | ʟ̥ | ʟ | | ʟ̠ | | | | |
| Lateral tap/flap | | | | | | | | | ɺ̥ | ɺ | | | 𝼈̊ | 𝼈 | | ʎ̆ | | ʟ̆ | | | | | | |

| | | BL | LD | D | A | PA | RF | P | V | U |
|---|---|---|---|---|---|---|---|---|---|---|
| Implosive | Voiced | ɓ | | | ɗ | | ᶑ | ʄ | ɠ | ʛ |
| Implosive | Voiceless | ɓ̥ | | | ɗ̥ | | ᶑ̊ | ʄ̊ | ɠ̊ | ʛ̥ |
| Ejective | Stop | pʼ | | | tʼ | | ʈʼ | cʼ | kʼ | qʼ |
| Ejective | Affricate | | p̪fʼ | t̪θʼ | tsʼ | t̠ʃʼ | tʂʼ | tɕʼ | kxʼ | qχʼ |
| Ejective | Fricative | ɸʼ | fʼ | θʼ | sʼ | ʃʼ | ʂʼ | ɕʼ | xʼ | χʼ |
| Ejective | Lateral affricate | | | | tɬʼ | | | c𝼆ʼ | k𝼄ʼ | q𝼄ʼ |
| Ejective | Lateral fricative | | | | ɬʼ | | | | | |
| Click (top: velar; bottom: uvular) | Tenuis | kʘ qʘ | | kǀ qǀ | kǃ qǃ | | k𝼊 q𝼊 | kǂ qǂ | | |
| Click (top: velar; bottom: uvular) | Voiced | ɡʘ ɢʘ | | ɡǀ ɢǀ | ɡǃ ɢǃ | | ɡ𝼊 ɢ𝼊 | ɡǂ ɢǂ | | |
| Click (top: velar; bottom: uvular) | Nasal | ŋʘ ɴʘ | | ŋǀ ɴǀ | ŋǃ ɴǃ | | ŋ𝼊 ɴ𝼊 | ŋǂ ɴǂ | ʞ | |
| Click (top: velar; bottom: uvular) | Tenuis lateral | | | | kǁ qǁ | | | | | |
| Click (top: velar; bottom: uvular) | Voiced lateral | | | | ɡǁ ɢǁ | | | | | |
| Click (top: velar; bottom: uvular) | Nasal lateral | | | | ŋǁ ɴǁ | | | | | |
