= Voiceless dental and alveolar nasals =

Consonantal sound represented by ⟨n̥⟩ in IPA

Voiceless alveolar nasal

n̥

n̊
- IPA number: 116+402A

Audio sample
- source · help

Encoding
- X-SAMPA: n_0
Image

Voiceless dental nasal

n̪̊

Audio sample
- source · help

Voiceless postalveolar nasal

n̠̊

A voiceless alveolar nasal is a type of consonant in some languages. The symbols in the International Phonetic Alphabet that represent the sound are ⟨n̥⟩ and ⟨n̊⟩, combinations of the letter for the voiced alveolar nasal and a diacritic indicating voicelessness above or below the letter.

== Features ==
Sagittal section of a voiceless alveolar nasal

Features of a voiceless alveolar nasal:

- Its manner of articulation is occlusive, which means it is produced by obstructing airflow in the vocal tract. Because the consonant is also nasal, the blocked airflow is redirected through the nose.
- There are four specific variants of [n̥]:
  - Dental, which means it is articulated with either the tip or the blade of the tongue at the upper teeth, termed respectively apical and laminal.
  - Denti-alveolar, which means it is articulated with the blade of the tongue at the alveolar ridge, and the tip of the tongue behind upper teeth.
  - Alveolar, which means it is articulated with either the tip or the blade of the tongue at the alveolar ridge, termed respectively apical and laminal.
  - Postalveolar, which means it is articulated with either the tip or the blade of the tongue behind the alveolar ridge, termed respectively apical and laminal.
- Its phonation is voiceless, which means it is produced without vibrations of the vocal cords.
- It is a nasal consonant, which means air is exclusively allowed to escape through the nose for nasal stops; otherwise, in addition to through the mouth.
- It is a median consonant, which means it is produced by directing the airstream down the midline of the tongue, rather than to the sides.
- Its airstream mechanism is pulmonic, which means it is articulated by pushing air only with the intercostal muscles and abdominal muscles, as in most speech sounds.

== Occurrence ==
=== Dental or denti-alveolar ===
Language	Word	IPA	Meaning	Notes
Iaai	hnââ	[n̪̊ɔɔ]	small	Contrasts /m̥ m̥ʷ n̪̊ ɳ̊ ɲ̊ ŋ̊/ and their voiced versions.

=== Alveolar ===
Language		Word	IPA	Meaning	Notes
Aleut		uhngix	[un̥ɣix]	'older sister (of a male)'	Voiced approximants and nasals may be partly devoiced in contact with a voiceless consonant and at the end of a word.
Alutiiq		pat'shnarluni	[pat.sn̥aχluni]	'(weather) is cold'	Contrasts with voiced /n/.
Burmese		နှစ်/hnac	[n̥ɪʔ]	'two'	
Central Alaskan Yup'ik		ceńa	[t͡səˈn̥a]	'edge'	
English	RP	chutney	[ˈt̠ʃʌˈt͡n̥ːɪ]	chutney	
English	RP	cotton	[ˈkɒˈtn̥̍]	cotton	
English	Some dialects	knee	[n̥iː]	knee	Occurs in several dialects. Realization of /n/.
Estonian		lasn	[ˈlɑsn̥]	'wooden peel'	Word-final allophone of /n/ after /t, s, h/. See Estonian phonology
Hmong	White Hmong	𖬆𖬰𖬩 / hnub	[n̥u˥]	'day'	Contrasts with voiced /n/. In Green Mong, it has merged with /n/.
Icelandic		hnífur	[ˈn̥iːvʏr̥]	'knife'	See Icelandic phonology
Jalapa Mazatec		hne	[n̥ɛ]	'falls'	Contrasts with a voiced and a laryngealized alveolar nasal.
Kildin Sami		чоӊтэ/čohnte	[t͡ʃɔn̥te]	'to turn'	
Northern Sámi		váhnen	[ˈvaːn̥en]	'parent'	
Polish		kupn	[ˈkupn̥]	'purchase, acquisition' (genitive plural)	Word-final allophone of /n/ after voiceless consonants. See Polish phonology
Welsh		fy nhad	[və n̥aːd]	'my father'	Occurs as the nasal mutation of /t/. See Welsh phonology
Xumi	Lower	[n̥ɑ̃˦]		'fur, animal hair'	Contrasts with the voiced /n/.
Xumi	Upper	[n̥ɔ̃˦]		'fur, animal hair'	Contrasts with the voiced /n/.

=== Post-alveolar ===
Language	Word	IPA	Meaning	Notes
Faroese	einki / onki	[ˈɔn̠̊t͡ʃɪ]	'nothing'	See Faroese phonology

== See also ==
- Index of phonetics articles

== Notes ==
Place →	Labial					Coronal										Dorsal					Laryngeal			
Manner ↓	Bilabial		Labiodental		Linguolabial		Dental		Alveolar		Postalveolar		Retroflex		(Alveolo-)palatal		Velar		Uvular		Pharyngeal/epiglottal		Glottal	
Nasal	m̥	m	ɱ̊	ɱ		n̼	n̪̊	n̪	n̥	n	n̠̊	n̠	ɳ̊	ɳ	ɲ̊	ɲ	ŋ̊	ŋ	ɴ̥	ɴ				
Plosive	p	b	p̪	b̪	t̼	d̼	t̪	d̪	t	d			ʈ	ɖ	c	ɟ	k	ɡ	q	ɢ	ʡ		ʔ	
Sibilant affricate							t̪s̪	d̪z̪	ts	dz	t̠ʃ	d̠ʒ	tʂ	dʐ	tɕ	dʑ								
Non-sibilant affricate	pɸ	bβ	p̪f	b̪v			t̪θ	d̪ð	tɹ̝̊	dɹ̝	t̠ɹ̠̊˔	d̠ɹ̠˔			cç	ɟʝ	kx	ɡɣ	qχ	ɢʁ	ʡʜ	ʡʢ	ʔh	
Sibilant fricative							s̪	z̪	s	z	ʃ	ʒ	ʂ	ʐ	ɕ	ʑ								
Non-sibilant fricative	ɸ	β	f	v	θ̼	ð̼	θ	ð	θ̠	ð̠	ɹ̠̊˔	ɹ̠˔	ɻ̊˔	ɻ˔	ç	ʝ	x	ɣ	χ	ʁ	ħ	ʕ	h	ɦ
Approximant		β̞		ʋ				ð̞		ɹ		ɹ̠		ɻ		j		ɰ						˷
Tap/flap		ⱱ̟		ⱱ					ɾ̥	ɾ			ɽ̊	ɽ						ɢ̆		ʡ̆		
Trill	ʙ̥	ʙ							r̥	r		r̠	ɽ̊r̥	ɽr					ʀ̥	ʀ	ʜ	ʢ		
Lateral affricate									tɬ	dɮ			tꞎ	d𝼅	c𝼆	ɟʎ̝	k𝼄	ɡʟ̝						
Lateral fricative							ɬ̪		ɬ	ɮ			ꞎ	𝼅	𝼆	ʎ̝	𝼄	ʟ̝						
Lateral approximant								l̪	l̥	l		l̠	ɭ̊	ɭ	ʎ̥	ʎ	ʟ̥	ʟ		ʟ̠				
Lateral tap/flap									ɺ̥	ɺ			𝼈̊	𝼈		ʎ̆		ʟ̆						

		BL	LD	D	A	PA	RF	P	V	U
Implosive	Voiced	ɓ			ɗ		ᶑ	ʄ	ɠ	ʛ
Implosive	Voiceless	ɓ̥			ɗ̥		ᶑ̊	ʄ̊	ɠ̊	ʛ̥
Ejective	Stop	pʼ			tʼ		ʈʼ	cʼ	kʼ	qʼ
Ejective	Affricate		p̪fʼ	t̪θʼ	tsʼ	t̠ʃʼ	tʂʼ	tɕʼ	kxʼ	qχʼ
Ejective	Fricative	ɸʼ	fʼ	θʼ	sʼ	ʃʼ	ʂʼ	ɕʼ	xʼ	χʼ
Ejective	Lateral affricate				tɬʼ			c𝼆ʼ	k𝼄ʼ	q𝼄ʼ
Ejective	Lateral fricative				ɬʼ					
Click (top: velar; bottom: uvular)	Tenuis	kʘ qʘ		kǀ qǀ	kǃ qǃ		k𝼊 q𝼊	kǂ qǂ		
Click (top: velar; bottom: uvular)	Voiced	ɡʘ ɢʘ		ɡǀ ɢǀ	ɡǃ ɢǃ		ɡ𝼊 ɢ𝼊	ɡǂ ɢǂ		
Click (top: velar; bottom: uvular)	Nasal	ŋʘ ɴʘ		ŋǀ ɴǀ	ŋǃ ɴǃ		ŋ𝼊 ɴ𝼊	ŋǂ ɴǂ	ʞ	
Click (top: velar; bottom: uvular)	Tenuis lateral				kǁ qǁ					
Click (top: velar; bottom: uvular)	Voiced lateral				ɡǁ ɢǁ					
Click (top: velar; bottom: uvular)	Nasal lateral				ŋǁ ɴǁ					
