= San Felipe Jalapa de Díaz =

- Municipality and town
- Location in Mexico
- Coordinates: 18°04′N 96°32′W
- Country: Mexico
- State: Oaxaca

Area
  - Total: 154.38 km^{2} (59.61 sq mi)

Population (2005)
  - Total: 25,395
- Time zone: UTC-6 (Central Standard Time)

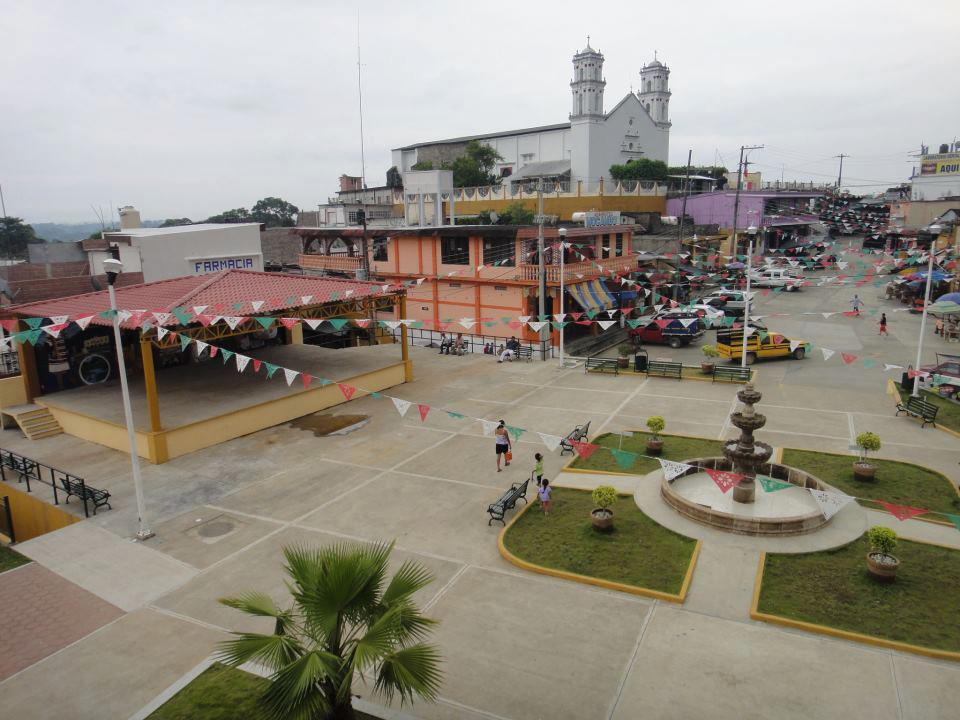
Town center of Jalapa de Diaz

San Felipe Jalapa de Díaz is a town, and the surrounding municipality of the same name, in the Mexican state of Oaxaca. It is some 50 km west of Tuxtepec, and is part of the Tuxtepec District of the Papaloapan Region.

== Geography ==
The municipality is at an altitude of 140 meters above sea level, and covers 154.38 km^{2}, located on the left bank of the Santo Domingo river. The climate is hot, averaging 24.7 °C year round, with rainfall in the months of June, July, August, September and October. Forested areas contain fig, avocado, mahogany, oak, cedar, limaloe, palm and ceiba hormiguillo. Wildlife includes deer, brocket deer, jaguar, white-tailed deer, gray fox, porcupine, armadillo and raccoon. The municipality includes the following communities:

- Agua de Olla,
- Agua de Tierra (Sección la Montaña),
- Arroyo Cacao,
- Arroyo Culebra,
- Arroyo Espuma,
- Arroyo Guaje,
- Arroyo Seco (San José Arroyo Seco),
- Arroyo Venado (Sección Tercera),
- Arroyo Zapotillo,
- Camino de Ixcatlán,
- Camino Zacatal,
- Chuparrosa,
- Colonia la Central,
- Colonia San Andrés,
- Desviación Cerro Quemado,
- Desviación Paso Carretero,
- La Concha,
- La Gloria,
- La Permuta,
- La Soledad,
- La Sorpresa,
- Llano Grande Uluápam,
- Loma Cafetal,
- Loma de San Juan,
- Loma Naranja,
- Los Zárates,
- Paso Carretero,
- Paso del Toro,
- Playa Chica,
- Rancho de la Playa,
- Santo Tomás,
- Sección Arroyo Crecido,
- Sección la Montaña (Agua de Tierra),
- Sección Lavida,
- Sección los Bibiano,
- Sección los Castro,
- Sección los Hernández,
- Sección los Palacios,
- Sección los Roques

== Economy ==
The main economic activity is agriculture, with crops that include large-scale coffee, corn, beans, sugar cane, medicinal plants and fodder. Some of the people keep cattle, goats and pigs. Some engage in hunting and fishing for their own consumption. Weaving at home is another occupation.

== Demography ==
As of 2005, the municipality had 5,035 households with a total population of 25,395, of which 20,654 spoke an indigenous language.
