= Creaky voice =

Type of phonation

◌̰

Encoding
- Entity (decimal): &#816;
- Unicode (hex): U+0330
Image

In linguistics, creaky voice (sometimes called laryngealisation, pulse phonation, vocal fry, or glottal fry) refers to a low, scratchy sound that occupies the vocal range below the common vocal register. It is a special kind of phonation in which the arytenoid cartilages in the larynx are drawn together; as a result, the vocal folds are compressed rather tightly, becoming relatively slack and compact. They normally vibrate irregularly at 20–50 pulses per second, about two octaves below the frequency of modal voicing, and the airflow through the glottis is very slow. Although creaky voice may occur with very low pitch, as at the end of a long intonation unit, it can also occur with a higher pitch. All contribute to make a speaker's voice sound creaky or raspy.

Short demonstration of vocal fry/creaky voice

The creaky voiced glottal approximant is one of the consonants featuring creaky voice.

== In phonology ==
In the Received Pronunciation of English, creaky voice has been described as a possible realisation of glottal reinforcement. For example, an alternative phonetic transcription of attempt [əˈtʰemʔt] could be [əˈtʰem͡m̰t].

In some languages, such as Jalapa Mazatec, creaky voice has a phonemic status; that is, the presence or absence of creaky voice can change the meaning of a word. In the International Phonetic Alphabet, creaky voice of a phone is represented by a diacritical tilde U+0330 ◌̰ COMBINING TILDE BELOW, for example [d̰]. The Danish prosodic feature stød is an example of a form of laryngealisation that has a phonemic function. A slight degree of laryngealisation, occurring in some Korean language consonants for example, is called "stiff voice".

== Social aspects ==
Use of creaky voice across general speech and in singing is termed "vocal fry".

Some evidence exists of vocal fry becoming more common in the speech of young female speakers of American English in the early 21st century, with researcher Ikuko Patricia Yuasa finding that college-age Americans perceived female creaky voice as "hesitant, nonaggressive, and informal but also educated, urban-oriented, and upwardly mobile." Yuasa further theorizes that because California is at the center of much of the entertainment industry, young Americans may unconsciously be using creaky voice more because of the media they consume.

== See also ==
- Creaky-voiced glottal approximant
- T-glottalization
- Vocal fry register
