= Popolocan languages =

Subfamily of Oto-Manguean languages of southern Mexico

Popolocan
- Geographic distribution: Oaxaca, Mexico
- Linguistic classification: Oto-Manguean: Eastern; Popolocan–Zapotecan; Popolocan
- Subdivisions: Chocho–Popoloca; Ixcatec; Mazatecan

Language codes
- ISO 639-3: –
- Glottolog: popo1293

The Popolocan languages are a subfamily of the Oto-Manguean language family of Mexico, spoken mainly in the state of Puebla.

The Popolocan languages should not be confused with the languages called Popoluca spoken in the state of Veracruz, which belong to the unrelated Mixe–Zoquean language family. The term comes from the Nahuatl language and means to speak unintelligibly, which is why Nahuatl speakers called several different unrelated languages "Popolōca". The Nahuatl term was later adopted by the Spanish. The convention now is that the Oto-Manguean languages are referred to as "Popoloca" and the Mixe–Zoquean languages are referred to as "Popoluca", although the latter term is falling into disuse.

== Languages ==
The Popolocan languages are subdivided into:

- the Chocho–Popolocan languages, including the Chocho language and seven distinct varieties of Popoloca.
- the Ixcatec language
- the Mazatecan languages including a number of related languages called Mazatec

== Proto-language ==
Fernández (1951) reconstructed Proto-Popolocan utilizing data from Chocho, Popoloca, Ixcatec, and Mazatec (Huautla de Jiménez, Oaxaca).
