= Tecóatl Mazatec =

Mazatecan language of Mexico

- Eloxochitlán Mazatec (San Jerónimo Tecóatl) (Eloxochitlán de Flores Magón)
- Native to: Mexico
- Region: Oaxaca, Puebla
- Native speakers: (53,000 cited 2000–2016)
- Language family: Oto-Manguean: Popolocan; Mazatecan; Highland; Western; Tecóatl Mazatec

Language codes
- ISO 639-3: Either: maa – Tecóatl Mazatec pbm – Puebla Mazatec
- Glottolog: sanj1286
- Acatepec Mazatec is classified as Vulnerable by the UNESCO Atlas of the World's Languages in Danger.

Tecóatl Mazatec, also known as Eloxochitlán Mazatec and Northern Highland Mazatec, is a Mazatecan language spoken in the Mexican states of Oaxaca and Puebla, notably in the towns of San Jerónimo Tecóatl, Eloxochitlán de Flores Magón, San Lucas Zoquiapam, Santa Cruz Acatepec, San Pedro Ocopetatillo, San Lorenzo Cuaunecuiltitla, Santa Ana Ateixtlahuaca, and San Francisco Huehuetlán. Egland found 76% intelligibility with Huautla, the prestige variety of Mazatec, though SIL reports that speakers of all dialects "have considerable difficulty understanding the prestigious variant spoken in Huautla de Jiménez"

See Mazatecan languages for a detailed description of these languages.

== Phonology ==
=== Vowels ===
The San Jerónimo Mazatec dialect contains four vowel sounds; /i e a o/.

=== Consonants ===
	Labial	Alveolar	Palatal	Retroflex	Velar	Glottal
Plosive		t			k	ʔ
Affricate		ts	tʃ	tʂ		
Fricative		s	ʃ			h
Nasal	m	n	ɲ			
Rhotic		r				
Approximant		l	j		w	

/w/ may have the allophone /β/.
