= Santa María, Oaxaca =

Santa María, Oaxaca may refer to:

- Santa María Alotepec
- Santa María Apazco
- Santa María Atzompa
- Santa María Camotlán
- Santa María Chachoapam
- Santa María Chilchotla
- Santa María Chimalapa
- Santa María Colotepec
- Santa María Cortijo
- Santa María Coyotepec
- Santa María del Rosario
- Santa María del Tule
- Santa María Ecatepec
- Santa María Guelacé
- Santa María Guienagati
- Santa María Huatulco
- Santa María Huazolotitlán
- Santa María Ipalapa
- Santa María Ixcatlán
- Santa María Jacatepec
- Santa María Jalapa del Marqués
- Santa María Jaltianguis
- Santa María la Asunción
- Santa María Lachixío
- Santa María Mixtequilla
- Santa María Nativitas
- Santa María Nduayaco
- Santa María Ozolotepec
- Santa María Pápalo
- Santa María Peñoles
- Santa María Petapa
- Santa María Quiegolani
- Santa María Sola
- Santa María Tataltepec
- Santa María Tecomavaca
- Santa María Temaxcalapa
- Santa María Temaxcaltepec
- Santa María Teopoxco
- Santa María Tepantlali
- Santa María Texcatitlán
- Santa María Tlahuitoltepec
- Santa María Tlalixtac
- Santa María Tonameca
- Santa María Totolapilla
- Santa María Xadani
- Santa María Yalina
- Santa María Yavesía
- Santa María Yolotepec
- Santa María Yosoyúa
- Santa María Yucuhiti
- Santa María Zacatepec
- Santa María Zaniza
- Santa María Zoquitlán

== See also ==
- Municipalities of Oaxaca
