= CORTV =

Public broadcaster of Oaxaca, Mexico

Oaxaca Radio and Television Corporation
- Corporación Oaxaqueña de Radio y Televisión
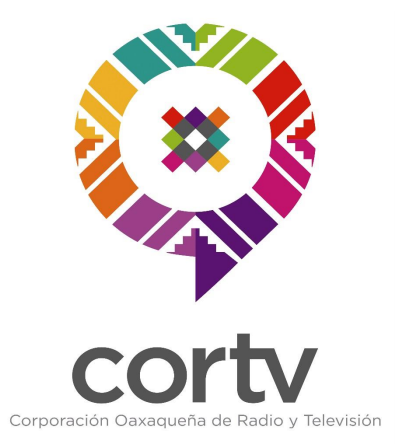

Agency overview
- Formed: 1980
- Agency executive: Alejandro Leyva Aguilar, Director
- Website: www.cortv.oaxaca.gob.mx

The Corporación Oaxaqueña de Radio y Televisión (CORTV, "Oaxacan Radio and Television Corporation") is a government agency of the Mexican state of Oaxaca charged with the operation of radio and television stations in the state.

CORTV operates a television network of the same name, with 16 transmitters, and it owns a 32-station FM radio network with an additional station in Oaxaca. The television network has shed 30 transmitters in recent years and also dropped six additional transmitters by failing to convert them to digital.

== History ==
Public broadcasting in Oaxaca began in the early 1980s under Governor Pedro Vásquez Colmenares, with the insertion of local opt-outs into the programming of the Canal 7 network of Imevisión. Original output consisted entirely of plays staged for television by the Compañía Teatral Palo Bravo, as the state lacked production resources. In 1988, the Instituto Oaxaqueño de Radio y Televisión (IORTV) was established.

On March 21, 1989, under the direction of Virgilio Caballero Pedraza, IORTV was reorganized as Radio y Televisión de Oaxaca (RTO). It adopted its present name in 1993.

The CORTV facilities were seized on August 1, 2006, during protests in the state after CORTV officials refused a women's group air time to make social demands. The takeover was ended on August 20 when the transmitters on Cerro del Fortín were shot at, damaging them and taking CORTV radio and television off the air.

== Television transmitters ==
In 2022, its concessions for television service were consolidated into one: XHCPBR-TDT (primary RF channel 36), which can have transmitters throughout the state. However, the existing transmitters were not moved to channel 36.

CORTV moved from virtual channel 9 to 19 in January 2024.

RF	Location	ERP
21	Acatlán de Pérez Figueroa	.100 kW
23	Concepción Pápalo	.200 kW
22	Corral de Piedra	10 kW
22	Huautla de Jiménez	5 kW
22	Juchitán de Zaragoza	.800 kW
36	Oaxaca	20 kW
15	Pinotepa Nacional	10 kW
27	Santa Catarina Juquila	.200 kW
28	San Agustín Loxicha	.006 kW
20	San Juan Bautista Tuxtepec	5 kW
22	San Pedro Pochutla	10 kW
22	San Pedro Tapanatepec	.200 kW
23	Santa María Ixcatlán	.002 kW
22	Santiago Juxtlahuaca	.200 kW
22	Teotitlán de Flores Magón	.200 kW
21	Tlaxiaco	.200 kW

In March 2018, in order to facilitate the repacking of TV services out of the 600 MHz band (channels 38-51), the transmitters for Juchitán de Zaragoza and Pinotepa Nacional were assigned new channels for continued digital operations.

== Radio transmitters ==
Note that XHOAX-FM "Global 96.9" broadcasts different programming from the other 32 stations in the network. XHCRR on Cerro Corral de Piedra is receivable in the city of Oaxaca.

The CORTV transmitters serving Oaxaca (XHOAX and XHCRR) broadcast in HD Radio.

Callsign	Frequency	City	ERP
XHCHT-FM	90.1	Chalcatongo de Hidalgo	.245 kW
XHHPL-FM	91.9	Huajuapan de León	3 kW
XHUAU-FM	97.3	Huautla de Jiménez	3 kW
XHLAB-FM	100.9	Lagunas/Barrio de la Soledad (Palma Sola)	20 kW
XHMAJ-FM	100.9	Mariscala de Juárez	3 kW
XHMPD-FM	90.9	Miahuatlán de Porfirio Díaz	.6 kW
XHCMA-FM	91.5	Nejapa de Madero	.245 kW
XHOAX-FM	96.9	Oaxaca de Juárez	18 kW
XHPLH-FM	91.7	Pluma Hidalgo	3 kW
XHPES-FM	105.9	Puerto Escondido	.5 kW
XHPUV-FM	92.1	Putla Villa de Guerrero	3 kW
XHSLC-FM	92.9	Salina Cruz	.5 kW
XHSFJ-FM	103.9	San Felipe Jalapa de Díaz	.245 kW
XHJBC-FM	89.3	San Juan Bautista Coixtlahuaca	.245 kW
XHSBC-FM	88.9	San Juan Bautista Cuicatlán	.245 kW
XHJBT-FM	102.7	San Juan Bautista Tuxtepec	.245 kW
XHSJB-FM	95.3	San Juan Bautista Valle Nacional	3 kW
XHSPH-FM	96.7	San Pedro Huamelula	.245 kW
XHPED-FM	107.9	San Pedro Tapanatepec	.245 kW
XHSAJ-FM	99.3	Santa Catarina Juquila	3 kW
XHSMJ-FM	89.7	Santa María Jalapa del Marqués	.245 kW
XHSMT-FM	99.5	Santa María Tecomavaca	.245 kW
XHSTH-FM	94.5	Santa María Tlahuitoltepec	3 kW
XHSTC-FM	107.5	Santiago Choapam	.245 kW
XHSJO-FM	101.1	Santiago Juxtlahuaca	.245 kW
XHSPN-FM	97.3	Santiago Pinotepa Nacional	3 kW
XHCRR-FM	92.9	Santiago Zoquiapan	3 kW
XHTFO-FM	94.3	Teotitlán de Flores Magón	.245 kW
XHPEP-FM	104.1	Teposcolula	3 kW
XHTLJ-FM	88.9	Tlaxiaco	3 kW
XHVTM-FM	102.5	Villa de Tamazulápam del Progreso	3 kW
XHVSE-FM	93.3	Villa Sola de Vega	.380 kW
XHRIG-FM	107.9	Villa Tututepec	.245 kW
