= Mazatlán Villa de Flores =

- Municipality and town
- Location in Mexico
- Coordinates: 18°01′N 96°55′W
- Country: Mexico
- State: Oaxaca

Area
  - Total: 137.79 km^{2} (53.20 sq mi)

Population (2005)
  - Total: 12,934
- Time zone: UTC-6 (Central Standard Time)

Mazatlán Villa de Flores is a town and municipality in Oaxaca in south-western Mexico. It is part of the Teotitlán District in the north of the Cañada Region. As of 2005, the municipality had a total population of 12,934.

== Geography ==
The municipality is located on 18 ° 01' Northern latitude and 96 ° 55' longitude West, at an altitude of 1140 meters above sea level, covering an area of 137.79 km^{2}. It borders to the North with Santa María Tecomavaca until Nopalera, to the South with the municipality of Huautla de Jimenez, to the East with the municipal agency of San Isidro Zoquiapam, which belongs to San Lucas Zoquiapam and Huautepec, and to the West with the municipalities of San Mateo Yoloxochitlán and Cuyamecalco. It is 198 kilometers Northwest of the capital of the State. Mazatlán Villa de Flores is located in a distinctly mountainous area; mountains include cerro Quemado (burnt Hill), the Agua de Cerro (Hill water), Pelón, Piedra Boluda, Peña Blanca, Cerro del Águila (Eagle Hill), Platanillo and Malangares, Pochotepec Hill, and Loma Celosa.

Among the most important rivers is the Rio Chico, also known as Rio Verde; the rio Grande, which reaches hilly land below Cuicatlán, becoming a lagoon called Igualeja and río Frío which originates in a cave. In Loma Celosa, located about 30 km away is a waterfall called Agua Tehuacán.

== History ==
Mazatlán in mazateco language means "Land of deer" (Tierra de Venados).

The town was named Mazatlán de Flores in 1922 and a decree in 1942 ordered the change to Mazatlán Villa de Flores. Teodoro Flores was born here, the father of anarchist and social reform activist Ricardo Flores Magón, who lived his early life here.
