= Sistema Huautla =

Cave system in Oaxaca, Mexico

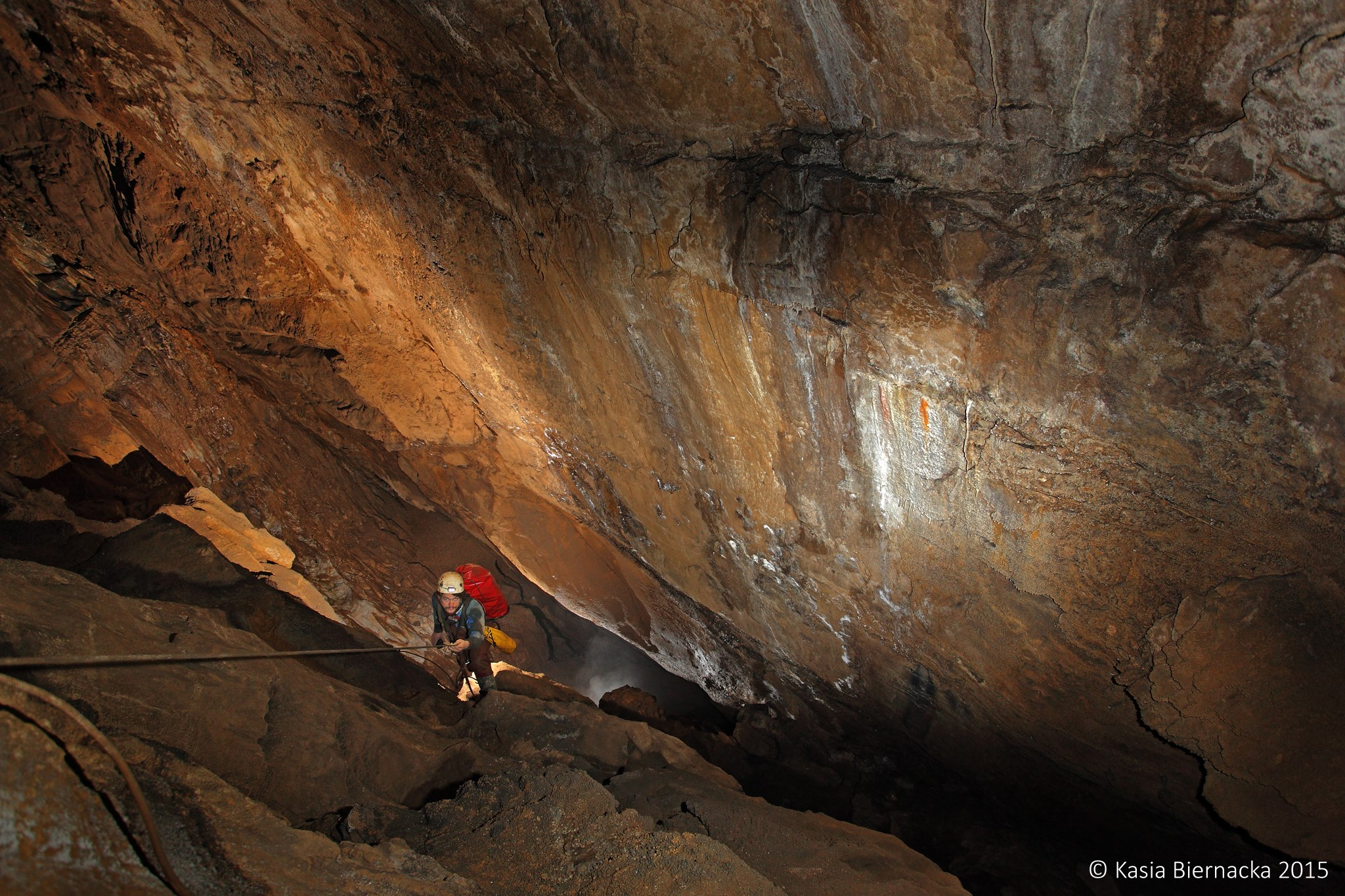
- Interactive map of Sistema Huautla
- Location: Sierra Mazateca, Oaxaca, Mexico
- Coordinates: 18.121214°N 96.800008°W
- Depth: 1,560 metres (5,120 ft) deep.
- Length: 100,242 metres (62.287 mi) total length.

Sistema Huautla is a cave system in the Sierra Mazateca mountains of the southern Mexican state of Oaxaca. As of May 2024, it is the deepest cave system in the Western Hemisphere, 1,560 metres (5,120 ft) from the highest entrance to the lowest reached point in the cave system, with over 62 miles of mapped passageways. It is the ninth-deepest cave in the world. It is also the 28th-longest cave system, with over 100 km of passages. Sistema Huautla has 30 entrances.

== Location ==
Sistema Huautla is a cave system in the Sierra Mazateca mountains in the Teotitlán District of the Cañada region in the southern Mexico state of Oaxaca. It is below the municipalities of Huautla de Jimenez, Huautepec, and Mazatlan Villa de Flores. As of May 2024, it was 100.2 kilometres (62.3 mi) long (total of all mapped passageways) with 30 distinct entrances and a depth measurement of 1,560 metres (5,120 ft) from its highest known entrance to its lowest reached point. Sistema Huautla is the deepest cave in the Western Hemisphere and the ninth-deepest cave in the world, tied in depth with the cave Hirlatzhöhle of Austria; it is listed as the twenty-eight longest.

== History ==
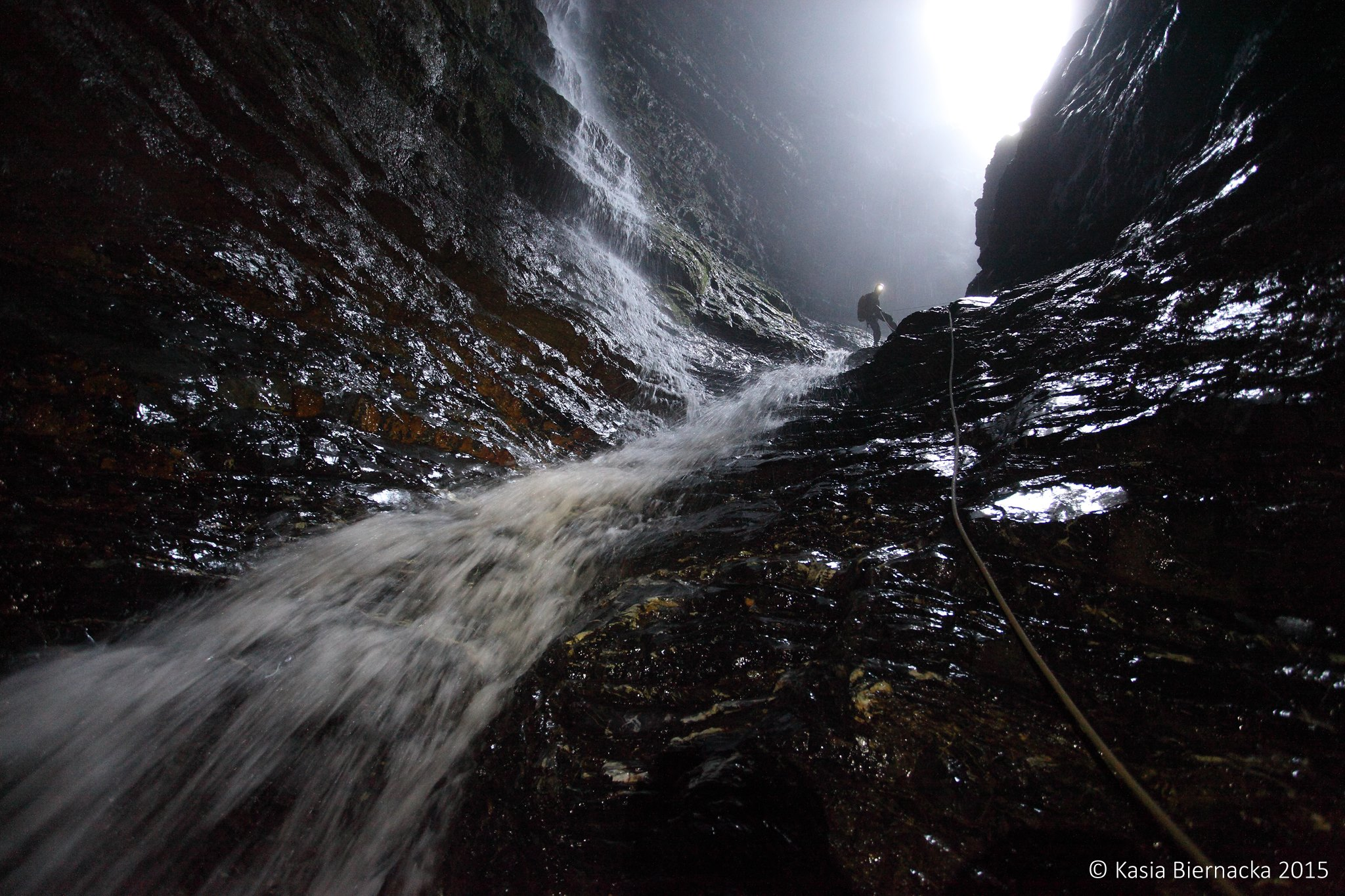
Waterfall in Sistema Huautla.

In 1965, cavers from Austin, Texas, exploring the Sierra Mazateca mountains found several large caves; during the 1960s, North American cavers subsequently gathered survey data and generated maps that showed their proximity to each other. Over time the Sótano de San Agustin was found to be connected to La Grieta and Nita Nanta, and eight more cave entrances were discovered. It became clear that they belonged to one cave system, Sistema Huautla. As of 2015 it is known to have 20 entrances.

In an expedition in 1977, the deepest-known point of the cave system was discovered after staging multiple underground camps, a flooded tunnel at 1325 meters, known as the San Agustín sump. Subsequent scuba-diving expeditions in 1979 and 1981 proved logistically insufficient to transport equipment to explore it further. In 1994, during a 135-day expedition of 44 people, mostly from the UK and the US, 11 were cave diving using closed-cycle life-support systems called rebreathers. They explored three parts of the sump system and discovered an upstream tunnel leading to the only known exit for the water that enters the Huautla caves, the spring of Peña Colorada. During a two-month expedition in 2013 involving 40 team members from the UK, USA, Canada, Poland, and Mexico, cavers entered through Sótano de San Agustin; it took divers three weeks to reach "what looked like a calm, rock-enclosed lake about 100 feet wide", the San Agustín sump. One of them established a new record depth when stopping at 1545 meters. The new survey data gave the cave a total length of 64.2 kilometers. A navigable connection between where water enters Sistema Huautla and where it exits at Peña Colorada has yet to be found.

Since then, consecutive annual expeditions have been launched as part of the Proyecto Espeleológico Sistema Huautla (PESH). In 2018, an international team of 24 cavers could not find a connection of the nearby Cueva de La Peña Colorada Sump VII with Sistema Huautla during their two-month-long expedition.

In 2022, the development of 100 kilometers was reached.

== Geology ==
Sistema Huautla is a karst groundwater basin. In 1994, dye tracing established Nita He and Nita Nashi as tributary caves via 1,100-meter-deep flow paths. The western hydrological boundary is the Huautla Santa Rosa Fault, in the East it is the Agua de Cerro Fault, and in the North the Plan de Escoba Fault.

== See also ==
- List of caves
- Speleology
- List of deepest caves
- List of longest caves
