= Tenango =

Tenango (Nahuatl: "place of walls" or "walled place") may refer to the following entities in Mexico:

== Places ==
- Tenango del Aire, Edomex
- Tenango del Valle, a municipality in Edomex
  - Tenango de Arista, the municipal seat
- Tenango, Chiapas, in Ocosingo, Chiapas
- Tenango, a community in Jantetelco, Morelos
- Tenango de Doria, Hidalgo
- Tenango de las Flores, Huauchinango, Puebla
- Río Tenango, an alternate name of the Amatzinac River in the states of Morelos and Puebla
- San José Tenango, Oaxaca
- San Miguel Tenango, Oaxaca
- Santiago Tenango, Oaxaca

== Other ==
- Battle of Tenango del Valle, an 1812 battle of the War of Mexican Independence
- Tenango embroidery, a style of embroidery which originated in the Tenango de Doria
