= Teotitlán =

Teotitlán may refer to:

- Teotitlán de Flores Magón, town and municipality in Oaxaca, Mexico
- Teotitlán del Valle, town and municipality in Oaxaca, Mexico
- Teotitlán District, district in Oaxaca, Mexico
