= CUX =

CUX, Çûx, or cux may refer to:

- CUX, a brand of motorcycles made by Super Soco
- Cuicatec language, spoken in Oaxaca state, Mexico, by ISO 639 code

- Tepeuxila Cuicatec language, by ISO 639-3 code

- Cuddihy Field, a private-use airport in Corpus Christi, Texas, US; see List of airports in Texas
- CUX, the vehicle plate area code for Cuxhaven District, Lower Saxony, Germany; see Vehicle registration plates of Germany#List of Area Codes
- Çûx, the Kurdish name for Aydınlar, Yayladere, a village in Turkey
- Cuxton railway station, a train station in Cuxton, Kent, England, UK

== See also ==
- Cucks, the plural of cuckold, meaning the husbands of adulterous wives
- Sucks, which has multiple meanings
