= Cuicatec language =

Oto-Manguean language spoken in Mexico

Cuicatec
- Native to: Mexico
- Region: Oaxaca
- Ethnicity: Cuicatecs
- Native speakers: 13,000 (2020 census)
- Language family: Oto-Manguean: Mixtecan; Cuicatec
- Writing system: Latin

Language codes
- ISO 639-3: Either: cux – Tepeuxila cut – Teutila
- Glottolog: cuic1234
- ELP: Cuicatec
- Extent of the Cuicatec language: prior to contact (olive green) and current (red)

Cuicatec is an Oto-Manguean language spoken in Oaxaca, Mexico. It belongs to the Mixtecan branch together with the Mixtec languages and the Trique language. The Ethnologue lists two major dialects of Cuicatec: Tepeuxila Cuicatec and Teutila Cuicatec. Like other Oto-Manguean languages, Cuicatec is tonal.

The Cuicatecs are closely related to the Mixtecs. They inhabit two towns: Teutila and Tepeuxila in western Oaxaca. According to the 2000 census, they number around 23,000, of whom an estimated 65% are speakers of the language. The name Cuicatec is a Nahuatl exonym, from [ˈkʷika] 'song' [ˈteka] 'inhabitant of place of'.

Cuicatec-language programming is carried by the CDI's radio station XEOJN, based in San Lucas Ojitlán, Oaxaca.

== Phonology ==
=== Vowels ===
The Santa Maria Papalo dialect contains six vowel sounds both oral and nasal:

	Front	Back
Close	i ĩ	u ũ
Mid	e ẽ	o õ
Mid	e ẽ	ɔ ɔ̃
Open	a ã	

=== Consonants ===
		Bilabial	Dental	Palatal	Velar		Glottal
		Bilabial	Dental	Palatal	plain	lab.	Glottal
Plosive		p	t		k	kʷ	ʔ
Affricate				tʃ			
Fricative	voiceless		s				
Fricative	voiced	β	ð		ɣ	ɣʷ	
Nasal		m	n				
Rhotic			ɾ, r				
Approximant			l	j		w	

Allophones of the following sounds /β ð ɣ n j t tʃ/ include [b d ɡ~x ŋ j̈ θ ʃ], respectively.

== Bibliography ==
- Anderson, E. Richard & Hilario Concepción R. 1983. Diccionario cuicateco: español-cuicateco, cuicateco-español. Mexico City: Instituto Lingüístico de Verano.
- Bradley, David P. 1991. A preliminary syntactic sketch of Concepción Pápalo Cuicatec. In C. Henry Bradley and Barbara E. Hollenbach (eds.), Studies in the syntax of Mixtecan languages 3, pp. 409–506. Dallas: Summer Institute of Linguistics and the University of Texas at Arlington.
- Campbell, Lyle. 1997. American Indian languages: the historical linguistics of Native America. Oxford: Oxford University Press.
- Needham, Doris & Marjorie Davis. 1946. Cuicateco phonology. International Journal of American Linguistics 12: 139-46.
- Prewett, Joanne and Omer E. 1974. The Segmental Phonology of Cuicateco of Santa María Pápalo Oaxaca, Mexico, pp. 53–92
