= Santos Reyes Pápalo =

Coordinates: 17°49′N 96°51′W

- Municipality and town
- Interactive map of Santos Reyes Pápalo
- Country: Mexico
- State: Oaxaca

Population (2020)
  - Total: 2,490
- Time zone: UTC-6 (Central Standard Time)
- Website: http://www.santosreyespapalo.org.mx/

Santos Reyes Pápalo is a town and municipality in Oaxaca in south-western Mexico. The municipality covers an area of km^{2}. It is part of Cuicatlán District in the north of the Cañada Region.

As of 2020, the municipality had a total population of 2,490.

== Demographics ==
1,896 residents speak the language Cuicateco. 57.5% of the population have only attended primary school. 34.3% of the population have attended middle school and 8.2% have a high school degree or better. 16.1% of the population are illiterate.
