= San Miguel Santa Flor =

- Municipality and town
- Location in Mexico
- Coordinates: 17°56′N 96°48′W
- Country: Mexico
- State: Oaxaca

Area
  - Total: 38.27 km^{2} (14.78 sq mi)

Population (2005)
  - Total: 795
- Time zone: UTC-6 (Central Standard Time)

San Miguel Santa Flor is a town and municipality in Oaxaca in south-western Mexico. The municipality covers an area of 38.27 km^{2}. It is part of Cuicatlán District in the north of the Cañada Region. It received its name as its first settlers cultivated many flowers.

As of 2005, the municipality had a total population of 795.
