= Santiago Texcalcingo =

Coordinates: 18°12′N 96°58′W

- Municipality and town
- Interactive map of Santiago Texcalcingo
- Country: Mexico
- State: Oaxaca
- Time zone: UTC-6 (Central Standard Time)

Santiago Texcalcingo is a town and municipality in Oaxaca in south-western Mexico. The municipality covers an area of km^{2}. It is part of the Teotitlán District in the north of the Cañada Region.

As of 2005, the municipality had a total population of .
