= San Juan Bautista Cuicatlán =

Town in Oaxaca, Mexico

- Municipality and town
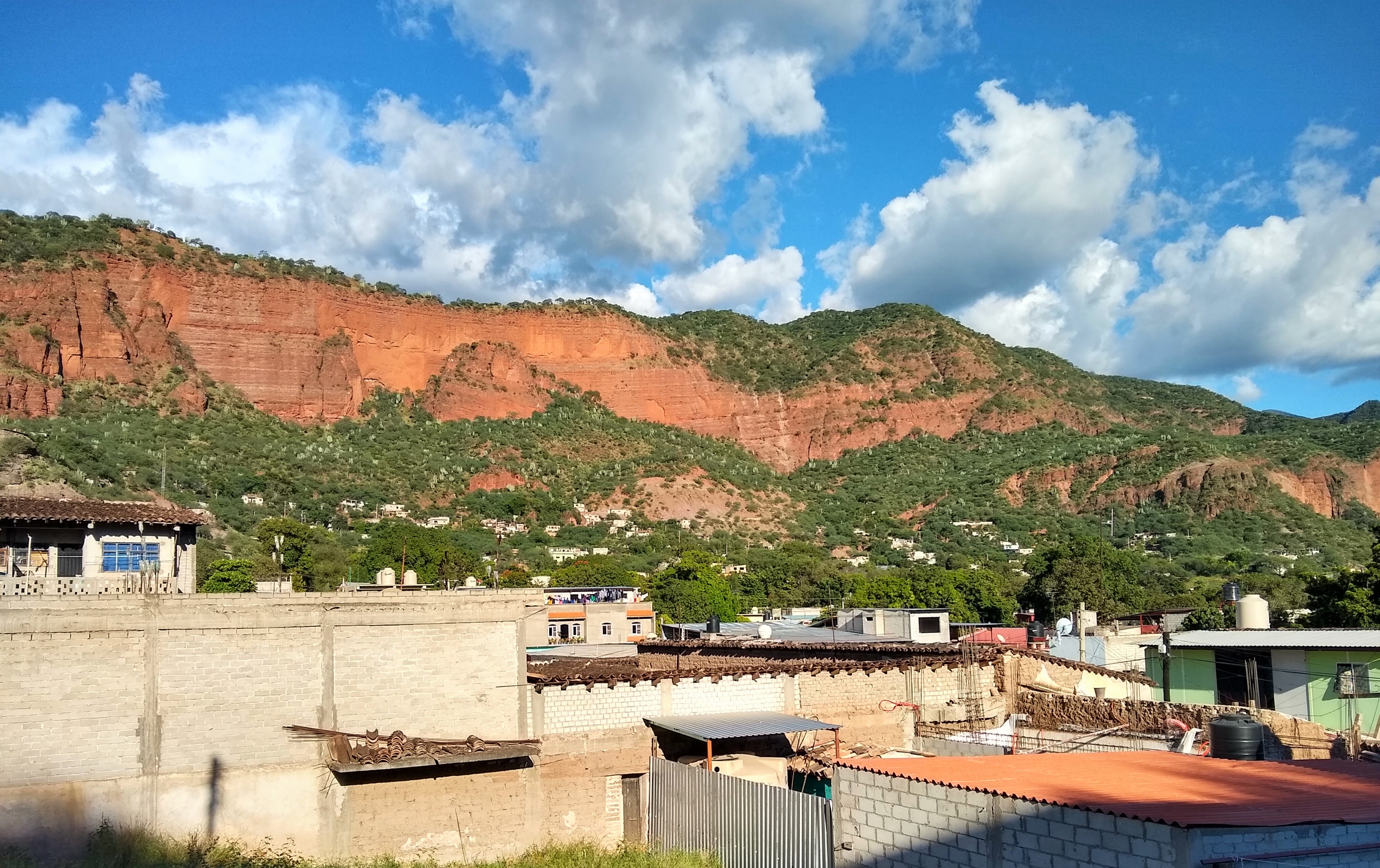
- Motto: Tierra del Canto
- Location in Mexico
- Coordinates: 17°48′N 96°57′W
- Country: Mexico
- State: Oaxaca

Government
  - President: Jorge Guerrero

Area
  - Total: 543.5 km^{2} (209.8 sq mi)
- Elevation: 620 m (2,030 ft)

Population (2005)
  - Total: 9,181.
- Time zone: UTC-6 (Central Standard Time)
- Postal code: 68600
- Area code: 236

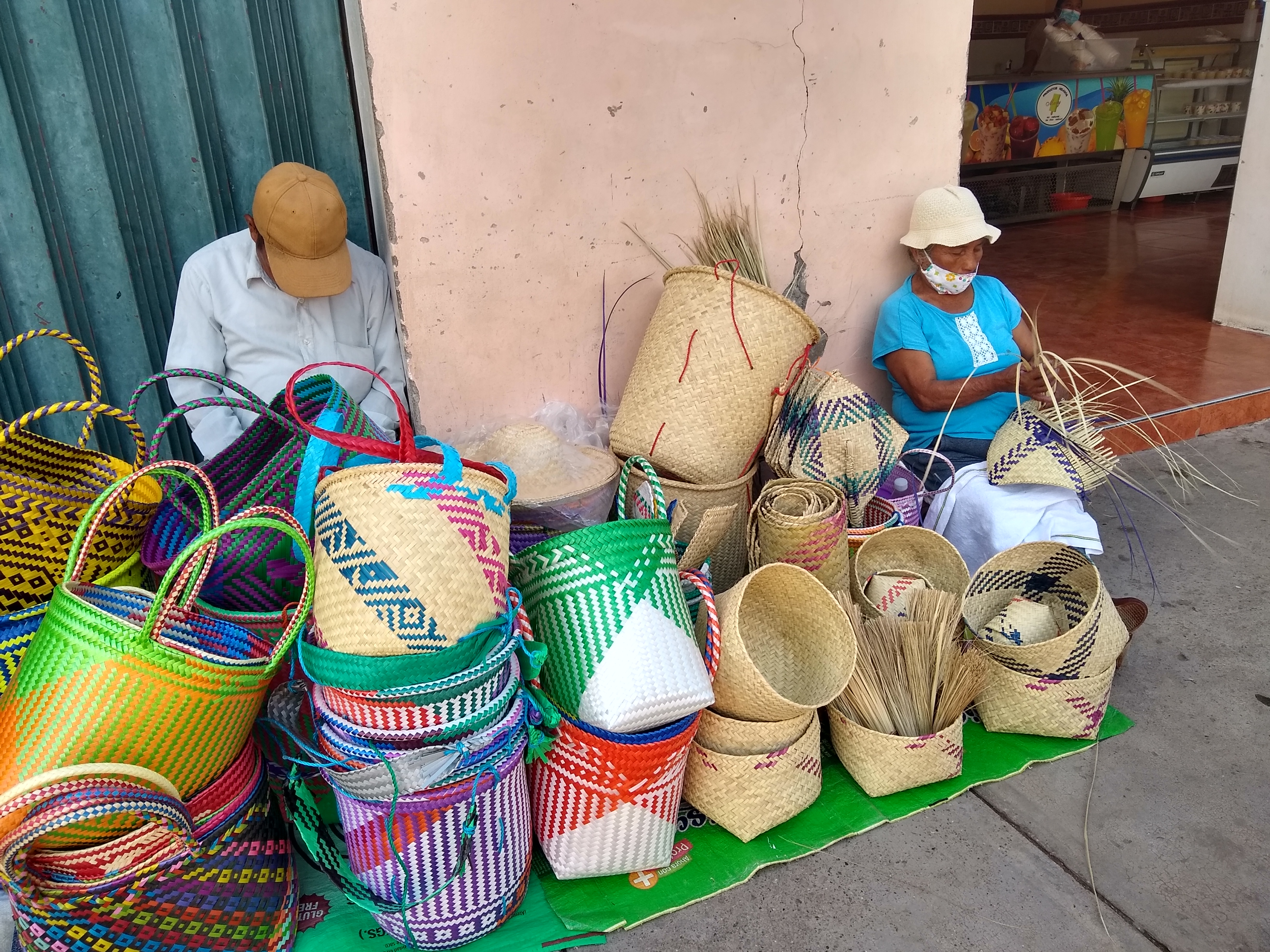
Weaver in San Juan Bautista Cuicatlan

San Juan Bautista Cuicatlán is a town and municipality in Oaxaca in southeastern Mexico. It is located in Cuicatlán District in the north of the Cañada Region.

== Education ==
The education system in Cuicatlán is entirely public schools. 12 pre-schools, 18 primary schools, two secondary schools, and one high school operate there. Four pre-schools and two primary schools are bilingual.

== Culture ==
Cuicatlán hosts its patron saint festival (Saint John the Baptist) on 24 June, with festivities occurring the entire week in the central park including dances, fireworks, rodeos, and basketball games.

Other major fiestas include Day of the Dead (October 31 to November 2), Semana Santa (Easter), and Christmas.

== Amenities ==
Located just outside the city center is the Cuicatlán Botanical Garden, which features trails that meander through a dry tropical forest. The Botanical Garden offers gazebos and an event kitchen. The associated Cuicatlán Archaeological Museum is under construction.

Ecotourism spots include San Jose De Chilar, Santiago Quiotepec, and Santa Maria Tecomovaca. These sites offer green macaw sightseeing tours, guided nature walks, hiking, mountain biking, horseback ridings, kayaking, cabins, camp grounds, and ancient ruins.

== Food ==
Cuicatlán is home to the Chilhuacle, or chili huatle pepper, which is in season in late August and September. Local people use this pepper to make dishes such as chile caldo. Other typical dishes of Cuicatlán include mole negro, mole rojo, salsa de chicatana (ants) which are available during the early summer months.
