= Teotitlán de Flores Magón =

- Municipality
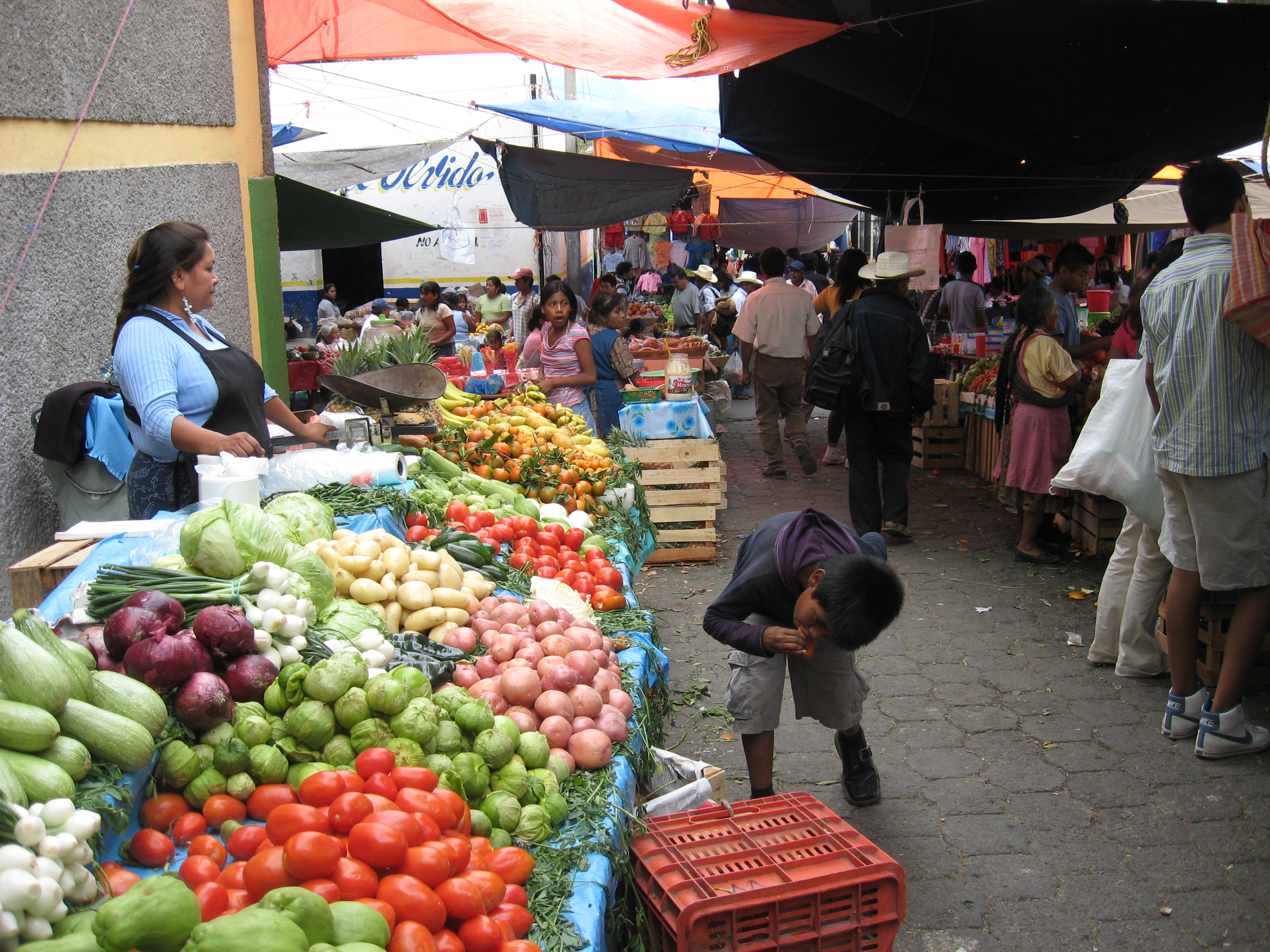
- Mercado in Teotitlán de Flores Magón

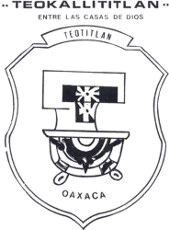
- Coat of arms

- Location in Mexico
- Coordinates: 18°8′N 97°5′W
- Country: Mexico
- State: Oaxaca

Area
  - Total: 95.69 km^{2} (36.95 sq mi)

Population (2005)
  - Total: 8,675
- Time zone: UTC-6 (Central Standard Time)

Teotitlán de Flores Magón, historically known as Teotitlán del Camino, is a town and municipality in the Cañada region of Oaxaca in south-western Mexico. It is part of the Teotitlán District in the north of the Cañada Region.

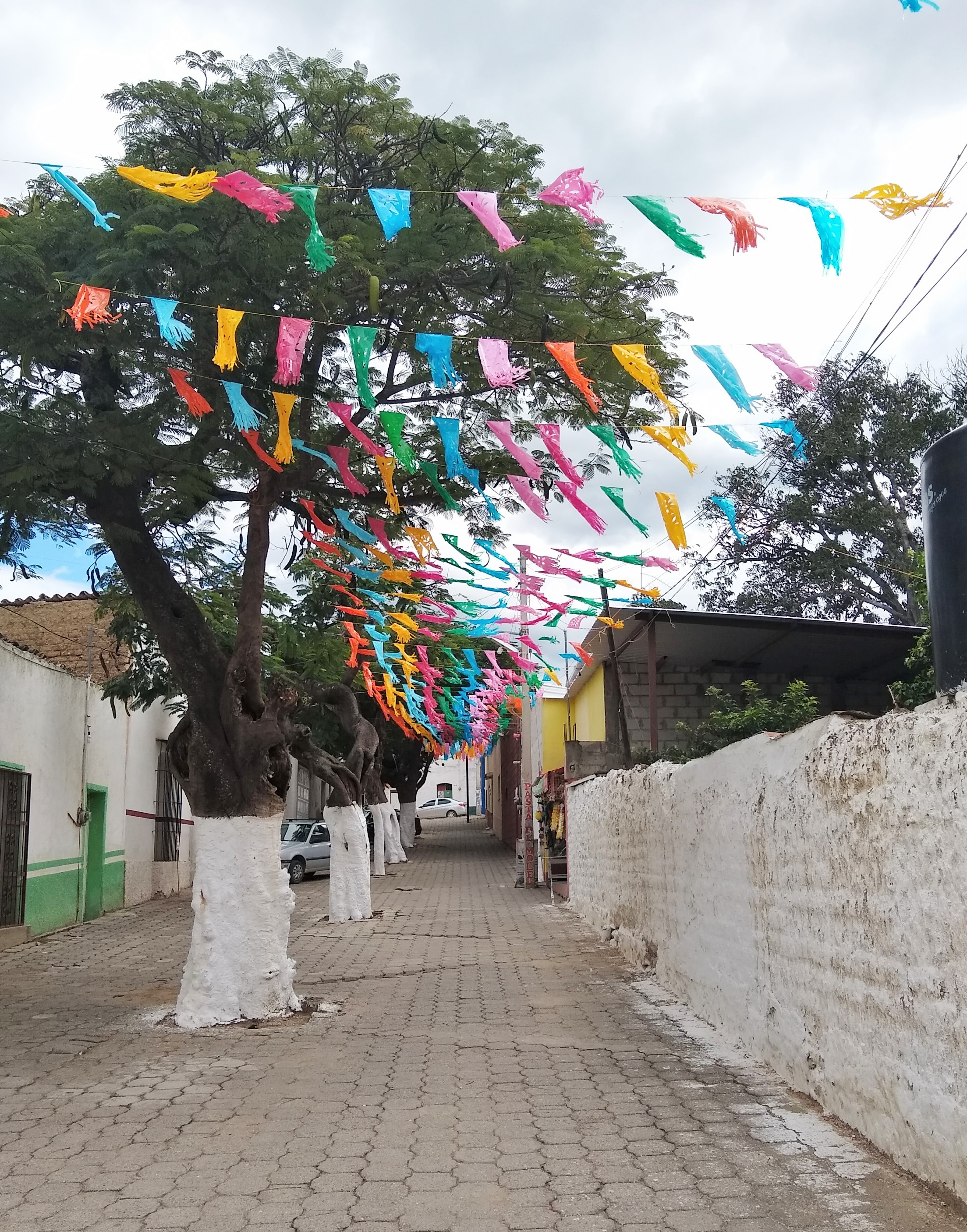
Angel Gil Alfaro street in Teotitlán de Flores Magón

== Municipality ==
The municipality covers an area of 95.69 km^{2}. As of 2005, the municipality had a total population of 8,675 of whom 1,610 speak an indigenous language.

== History ==
In prehispanic times, Teotitlan was an altepetl and a significant religious center. It was populated by Nahuatl-speaking Nonoalca, but much of the surrounding region was inhabited by Mazatec people. Its subject towns included San Antonio Nanahuatipam, Huautla and Mazatlán Villa de Flores. It is debated whether Teotitlan was conquered by the Aztec Empire or was its ally. Teotitlan had three priest-rulers: Teuctlamacaz (the most important one), Ecatlamacaz, and Tetzatlamacaz. The main deities mentioned in historical sources are Cihuacoatl, Coatl (perhaps identified with Quetzalcoatl), and Teiztapalli (a form of Xipe Totec). The local priests were renowned for their strict absistence rites. Teotitlan and its subjects celebrated the eighteen annual festivals of the Aztecs and a new fire ceremony every four years. Crops cultivated included maize, chile, beans and squash, though farmland was somewhat restricted. Consumption of meat was restricted to the nobility, while the macehuales (commoners) subsisted off of tortillas, chiles, and pinole porridge. Teotitlan was a center of clothing production, and it was traded as far away as Guatemala.

Jesús Flores Magón was born in Teotitlán in 1871 and Enrique Flores Magón in 1877, who together with their brother Ricardo Flores Magón- who was born in nearby San Antonio Eloxochitlán- stood out in the opposition to the government of Porfirio Díaz and are considered precursors of the Mexican Revolution. In their honor, in 1977 the Congress of Oaxaca officially changed the name of the town from Teotitlán del Camino to Teotitlán de Flores Magón.
