= Tlalixtac =

Tlalixtac may refer to:

- Tlalixtac de Cabrera
- Santa María Tlalixtac
