= Teutila Cuicatec language =

Oto-Manguean language of Oaxaca, Mexico

Tepeuxila Cuicatec
- Native to: Mexico
- Region: Oaxaca
- Ethnicity: Cuicatec
- Native speakers: (3,100 cited 2000)
- Language family: Oto-Manguean: Mixtecan; Tepeuxila Cuicatec
- Writing system: Latin

Language codes
- ISO 639-3: cut
- Glottolog: teut1235

Teutila Cuicatec is a language spoken in the town of San Pedro Teutila in the Mexican state of Oaxaca.
