= San Andrés Teotilalpam =

- Municipality and town
- Location in Mexico
- Coordinates: 17°57′N 96°39′W
- Country: Mexico
- State: Oaxaca

Area
  - Total: 102.07 km^{2} (39.41 sq mi)

Population (2005)
  - Total: 4,255
- Time zone: UTC-6 (Central Standard Time)

San Andrés Teotilalpam is a town and municipality in Oaxaca in south-western Mexico. The municipality covers an area of 102.07 km^{2}. It is part of Cuicatlán District in the north of the Cañada Region.

As of 2005, the municipality had a total population of 4,255.
