= Eloxochitlán de Flores Magón =

- Municipality and town
- Location in Mexico
- Coordinates: 18°10′35″N 96°52′30″W
- Country: Mexico
- State: Oaxaca

Area
  - Total: 28 km^{2} (11 sq mi)

Population (2005)
  - Total: 4,042
- Time zone: UTC-6 (Central Standard Time)

Eloxochitlán de Flores Magón, formerly known as San Antonio Eloxochitlán, is a city and municipality in the Mexican state of Oaxaca. It is part of the Teotitlán District in the north of the Cañada Region. Approximately 96% of the inhabitants of the municipality speak the indigenous Tecóatl Mazatec.

The municipality encompasses approximately 28 km^{2} and, as of 2005, had a population of 4,042.

== The town ==
Franciscans arrived in about 1827 and founded the town, the first in Mazatec territory to be built by outsiders.

The city is best known as the birthplace of the Mexican Revolutionary journalist and activist Ricardo Flores Magón, after whom the municipality was renamed.

== The municipality ==
As municipal seat Eloxochitlán has governing authority over the following communities:

Agua Ancha, Agua Colorada, Agua de Cuchara (Agua de Cucharón), Agua de Cueva, Agua de Máscara, Agua Escalera, Agua Iglesia, Agua Torcida, Barrio la Escopeta, Barrio Moctezuma, Camote Español, Cerro de Plaza, Colonia las Flores, Corral, El Cimiento, El Maguey, La Raya San Pedro, La Tranca, Peña Colorada, Plan de Cebolla (Cebollín), Puente de Fierro, Puerto Rosete, Rincón de las Flores (Rincón Brujo), and San José Buenavista
