= Jesús Flores Magón =

Mexican politician (1871–1930)

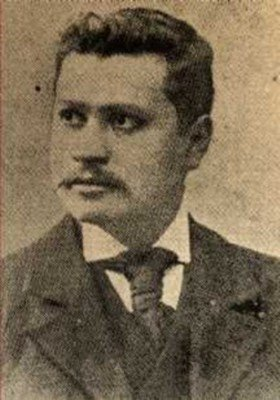
- Born: 6 January 1871; San Jerónimo Tecóatl, Oaxaca
- Died: 7 December 1930 (aged 59); Mexico City
- Occupations: Journalist, politician, lawyer

Gaspar Jesús Melchor Flores Magón (6 January 1871 – 7 December 1930) was a Mexican politician, journalist, and jurist. The more moderate brother of Ricardo and Enrique Flores Magón, he served in the cabinet of Francisco I. Madero.

== Biography ==
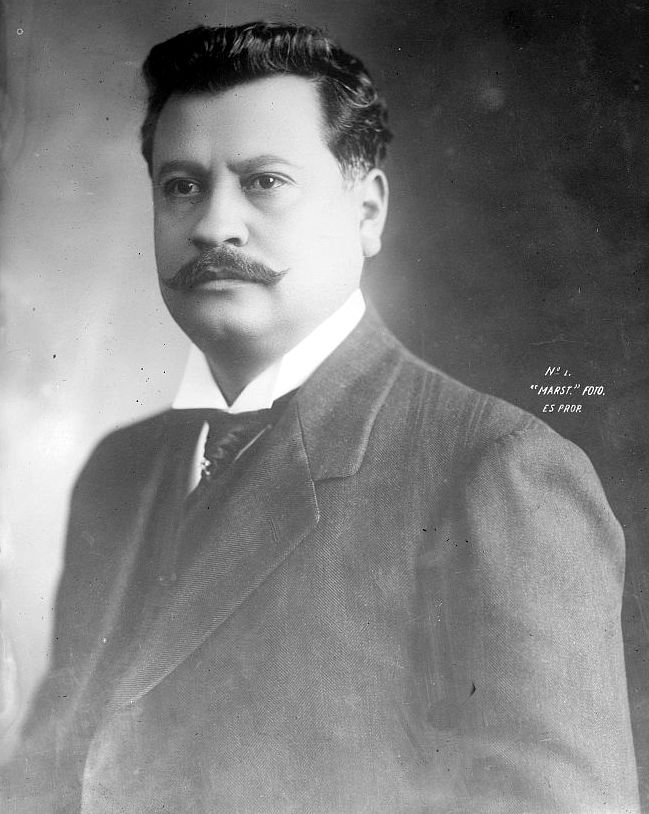
A portrait

Jesús Flores Magón was born in San Jerónimo Tecóatl in the state of Oaxaca in 1871, to Margarita Magón and Teodoro Flores, a Nahua who had fought in Benito Juárez's Liberal Army. At an early age the family relocated to Mexico City.

He graduated in law in 1897 and, in conjunction with his brother Ricardo, founded the newspaper Regeneración, the first edition of which appeared on 7 August 1900. As editor of the paper, he was jailed on several occasions for criticising the judicial system. He was later expelled from the country for his anti-Porfirio Díaz writings; he fled to the United States where his political differences with his brothers – also exiled, and now espousing anarchist beliefs – deepened.

He returned to Mexico in 1910 following the overthrow of Porfirio Díaz in the early days of the Mexican Revolution. In 1911, alongside Antonio Irineo Villarreal, he began publishing a moderate version of the newspaper Regeneración in Mexico City, while his brothers – still in their U.S. exile – published a more radical broadsheet under the same title in Los Angeles, California.

President Francisco I. Madero appointed him under-secretary for justice in his cabinet. He also served as secretary of the interior from February to November 1912 and, subsequently, as secretary for development. Following Victoriano Huerta's coup d'état in February 1913, he again went into exile. Upon returning, he resumed his law practice.

During the tumultuous years that followed, he remained in Mexico City. When Venustiano Carranza assumed the presidency, he chose to leave the country because he had been the running mate of presidential candidate Manuel Calero y Sierra; he returned to Mexico following Carranza's assassination.

== See also ==
- Magonism
- Regeneración
