= Cuicatlán District =

- District
- Oaxaca regions and districts: Cañada to North
- Coordinates: 17°48′N 96°57′W
- Country: Mexico
- State: Oaxaca
- Seat: San Juan Bautista Cuicatlán

Population (2020)
  - Total: 52,434

Cuicatlán District (Spanish: Distrito de Cuicatlán) is located in the south of the Cañada Region of the State of Oaxaca, Mexico. The district includes 20 municipalities, bringing together a total of 233 settlements.

== Municipalities ==
The district includes the following municipalities:

Municipality code	Name	Population		Land Area			Population density	
Municipality code	Name	2020	Rank	km^{2}	sq mi	Rank	2020	Rank
027	Chiquihuitlán de Benito Juárez	2,179	11	35.99	13.90	17	61/km^{2} (157/sq mi)	2
019	Concepción Pápalo	2,754	6	173.6	67.0	4	16/km^{2} (41/sq mi)	16
024	Cuyamecalco Villa de Zaragoza	3,644	5	79.12	30.55	9	46/km^{2} (119/sq mi)	3
098	San Andrés Teotilalpam	4,233	4	145.5	56.2	7	29/km^{2} (75/sq mi)	11
139	San Francisco Chapulapa	2,195	9	62.45	24.11	11	35/km^{2} (91/sq mi)	6
177	San Juan Bautista Cuicatlán	10,365	1	496.4	191.7	1	21/km^{2} (54/sq mi)	14
182	San Juan Bautista Tlacoatzintepec	2,181	10	50.13	19.36	15	44/km^{2} (113/sq mi)	4
220	San Juan Tepeuxila	2,692	7	255.1	98.5	2	11/km^{2} (27/sq mi)	18
276	San Miguel Santa Flor	691	18	19.82	7.65	20	35/km^{2} (90/sq mi)	7
311	San Pedro Jaltepetongo	483	20	51.54	19.90	14	9/km^{2} (24/sq mi)	19
313	San Pedro Jocotipac	730	17	69.44	26.81	10	11/km^{2} (27/sq mi)	17
326	San Pedro Sochiapam	5,052	2	152.2	58.8	5	33/km^{2} (86/sq mi)	8
330	San Pedro Teutila	4,296	3	148.7	57.4	6	29/km^{2} (75/sq mi)	10
355	Santa Ana Cuauhtémoc	681	19	41.27	15.93	16	17/km^{2} (43/sq mi)	15
425	Santa María Pápalo	2,058	12	55.79	21.54	12	37/km^{2} (96/sq mi)	5
436	Santa María Texcatitlán	896	16	35.45	13.69	18	23/km^{2} (59/sq mi)	13
438	Santa María Tlalixtac	1,839	13	24.13	9.32	19	76/km^{2} (197/sq mi)	1
478	Santiago Nacaltepec	1,599	14	204.5	79.0	3	8/km^{2} (20/sq mi)	20
527	Santos Reyes Pápalo	2,490	8	83.42	32.21	8	30/km^{2} (77/sq mi)	9
558	Valerio Trujano	1,376	15	54.71	21.12	13	25/km^{2} (65/sq mi)	12
	Distrito Cuicatlán	52,434	—	2,239	864.48	—	23/km^{2} (61/sq mi)	—
Source: INEGI
