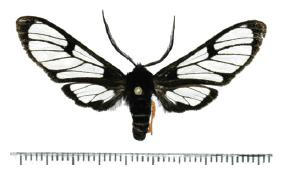

Scientific classification
- Domain: Eukaryota
- Kingdom: Animalia
- Phylum: Arthropoda
- Class: Insecta
- Order: Lepidoptera
- Superfamily: Noctuoidea
- Family: Erebidae
- Subfamily: Arctiinae
- Genus: Homoeocera
- Species: H. papalo

Binomial name
- Homoeocera papalo Laguerre, 2010

= Homoeocera papalo =

Species of moth

Homoeocera papalo is a moth of the subfamily Arctiinae. It is known only from a very restricted area in Oaxaca state in Mexico, at high altitude.

The length of the forewings is 20–21 mm. The biology of this species is unknown.

== Etymology ==
The name is a reference to the type locality, Concepción Pápalo, a small city in north east Oaxaca state. The name Papalo means butterfly.
