= Santa María Teopoxco =

- Municipality and town
- Location in Mexico
- Coordinates: 18°10′N 96°57′W
- Country: Mexico
- State: Oaxaca
- Time zone: UTC-6 (Central Standard Time)

Santa María Teopoxco is a town and municipality in Oaxaca in south-western Mexico. The municipality covers an area of 6 km^{2}. It is part of the Teotitlán District in the north of the Cañada Region.

As of 2005, the municipality had a total population of 4,651.
