= Santa Ana Ateixtlahuaca =

- Municipality and town
- Location in Mexico
- Coordinates: 18°11′N 96°54′W
- Country: Mexico
- State: Oaxaca
- Time zone: UTC-6 (Central Standard Time)

Santa Ana Ateixtlahuaca is a town and municipality in Oaxaca in south-western Mexico. The municipality covers an area of 19.14 km^{2}. It is part of the Teotitlán District in the north of the Cañada Region.

As of 2005, the municipality had a total population of 572.
