= Concepción Pápalo =

Coordinates: 17°51′N 96°52′W

- municipality and town
- Location in Mexico
- Country: Mexico
- State: Oaxaca

Area
  - Total: 94.4 km^{2} (36.4 sq mi)

Population (2005)
  - Total: 2,920
- Time zone: UTC-6 (Central Standard Time)

Concepción Pápalo is a town and municipality in Oaxaca in south-western Mexico. The municipality covers an area of 94.4 km^{2}. It is part of the Cuicatlán District in the north of the Cañada Region.

As of 2005, the municipality had a total population of 2,920.

Moth Homoeocera papalo is named after the town.
