= Santa María la Asunción =

- Municipality and town
- Location in Mexico
- Coordinates: 18°49′N 99°34′W
- Country: Mexico
- State: Oaxaca
- Time zone: UTC-6 (Central Standard Time)
- Website: (in Spanish) /Official site

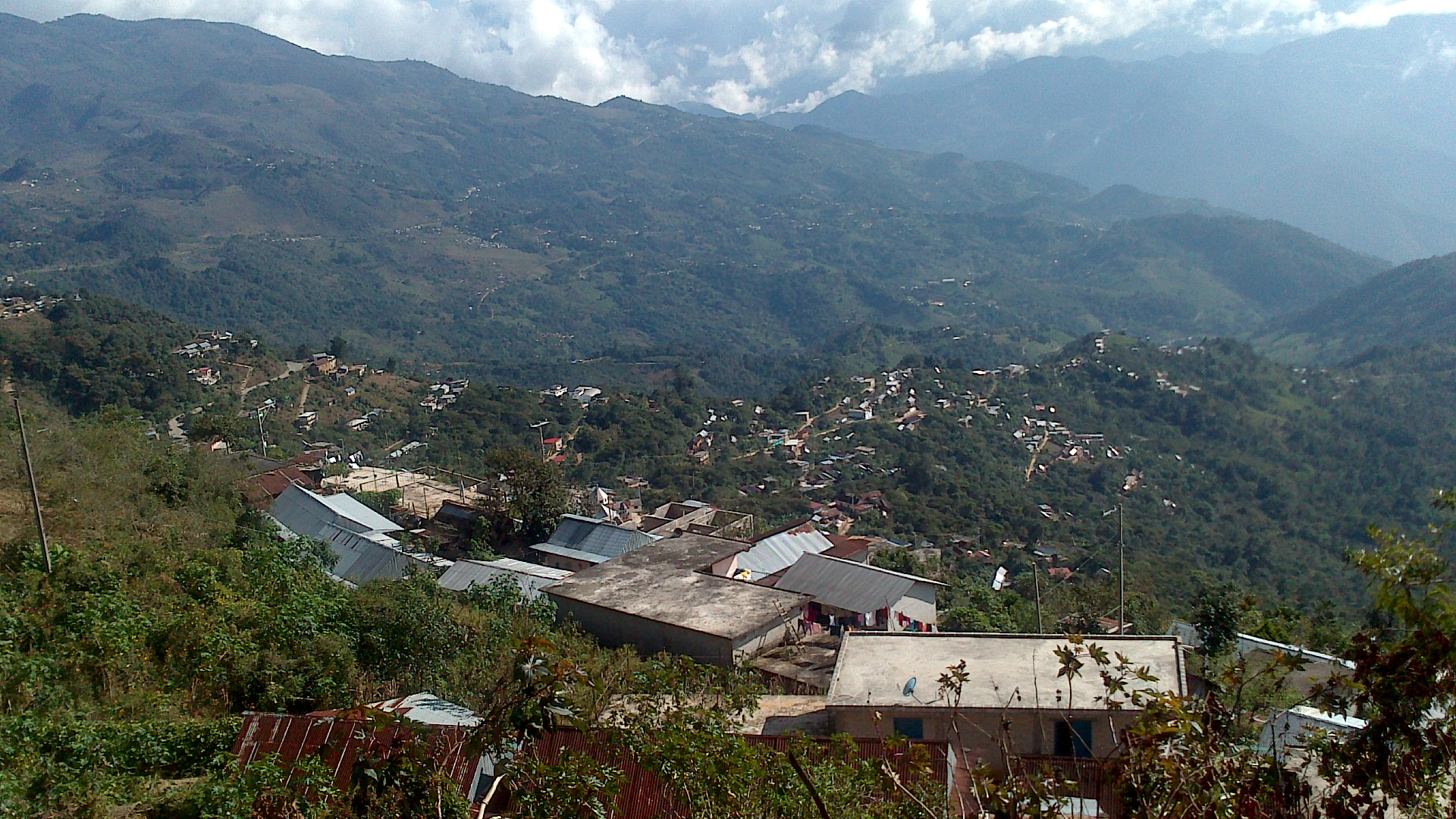

Santa María la Asunción is a town and municipality in Oaxaca in south-western Mexico. The municipality covers an area of km^{2}. It is part of the Teotitlán District in the north of the Cañada Region.

As of 2010, the municipality had a total population of 3,252.
