= Cuicatecs =

Indigenous people of Mexico

Total population
- 13,000 (2020)

Regions with significant populations

Languages
- Cuicatec and Spanish

Religion
- Catholic

Related ethnic groups
- Mixtecs and Triques

The Cuicatecs are an Indigenous people of Mexico. The Cuicatecs traditionally speak the Cuicatec language and are closely related to the Mixtecs. Alongside the Trique and Mixtec, the Cuicatecs form one branch of the Otomanguean language family.

They inhabit two towns in the state of Oaxaca: Teutila and Tepeuxila. According to the 2012 census, they number around 12,785, of whom an estimated 65% are speakers of the language. The name Cuicatec is a Nahuatl exonym, from [ˈkʷika] 'song' [ˈteka] 'inhabitant of place of'.
