= San Pedro Ocopetatillo =

- Municipality and town
- Location in Mexico
- Coordinates: 18°12′N 96°55′W
- Country: Mexico
- State: Oaxaca
- Time zone: UTC-6 (Central Standard Time)

San Pedro Ocopetatillo is a town and municipality in Oaxaca in south-western Mexico. It is part of the Teotitlán District in the north of the Cañada Region.
