= San Francisco Huehuetlán =

- Municipality and town
- Location in Mexico
- Coordinates: 18°12′N 96°57′W
- Country: Mexico
- State: Oaxaca

Area
  - Total: 15.31 km^{2} (5.91 sq mi)

Population (2005)
  - Total: 1,251
- Time zone: UTC-6 (Central Standard Time)

San Francisco Huehuetlán is a town and municipality in Oaxaca in south-western Mexico. The municipality covers an area of 15.31 km^{2}. It is part of the Teotitlán District in the north of the Cañada Region.

As of 2005, the municipality had a total population of 1,251.
