= Huautepec =

- Municipality and town
- Location in Mexico
- Coordinates: 18°06′N 96°47′W
- Country: Mexico
- State: Oaxaca

Population (2005)
  - Total: 5,672
- Time zone: UTC-6 (Central Standard Time)

Huautepec (previously San Miguel Huautepec) is a town and municipality in Oaxaca in south-western Mexico. The municipality covers an area of 35.72km^{2}. It is part of the Teotitlán District in the north of the Cañada Region. As of 2005, the municipality had a total population of 5,672.

== Geography ==
Huautepec belongs to the Teotitlán de Flores Magón district and is located 257 kilometers north of the state capital. It is 1660 meters above sea level; The total area of the municipality is 35.72 square kilometers. The Quiotepec river forms the boundary to the municipality of Chiquihuitlan and serves agricultural needs, like irrigation of fields. As of 2010 Huatepec does not boast many natural resources; past forest areas have been deforested. The weather is temperate all year round with summer rains and winds crossing from north to south.

== Socio-demographic profile ==
In the Mazatec language, Huautepec means "on the hill of eagles".

As of 2005, the municipality had a total population of 5,672. At present young citizens migrate to other latitudes like Tehuacan in Puebla and Tuxtepec in Oaxaca. The percentage of religion in the municipality is high. According to the INEGI in 2000 5,474 people identified themselves as Catholics and only 129 people were not part of any religion. There were a total of 1,243 households. Most people have built their houses with basic construction materials such as concrete, concrete block and sheet metal, but one can still find some adobe houses and palm thatched roofs. The town is located on a dirt road, 3 miles off the road from Huautla to Tuxtepec, which is the only direct route to the municipality. There are other dirt roads connecting the town with its various agencies and communities.

As in all of the region, the dance of the huehuentones is traditionally danced on Día de Muertos.

== Economy ==
There is a significant production of oranges and bananas sold locally. Fields mostly grow maize and beans, which are the basic grains; there are also small coffee producers which are economically important. Livestock primarily consists of sheep, goats and poultry; very little cattle exists.
