= Santa Cruz Acatepec =

- Municipality and town
- Location in Mexico
- Coordinates: 18°9′N 96°52′W
- Country: Mexico
- State: Oaxaca

Area
  - Total: 14.03 km^{2} (5.42 sq mi)
- Time zone: UTC-6 (Central Standard Time)

Santa Cruz Acatepec is a town and municipality in Oaxaca in south-western Mexico. The municipality covers an area of 14.03 km^{2}. It is part of the Teotitlán District in the north of the Cañada Region.

As of 2005, the municipality had a total population of 1,301.
