= San Antonio Nanahuatipam =

- Municipality and town
- Location in Mexico
- Coordinates: 18°08′N 97°07′W
- Country: Mexico
- State: Oaxaca

Area
  - Total: 127.58 km^{2} (49.26 sq mi)

Population (2005)
  - Total: 1,298
- Time zone: UTC-6 (Central Standard Time)

San Antonio Nanahuatipam is a town and municipality in Oaxaca in south-western Mexico. The municipality covers an area of 127.58 km^{2}. It is part of the Teotitlán District in the north of the Cañada Region.

As of 2005, the municipality had a total population of 1,298.
