= San Juan Tepeuxila =

- Municipality and town
- Location in Mexico
- Coordinates: 17°43′N 96°50′W
- Country: Mexico
- State: Oaxaca

Area
  - Total: 366.16 km^{2} (141.38 sq mi)

Population (2005)
  - Total: 2,914
- Time zone: UTC-6 (Central Standard Time)

San Juan Tepeuxila is a town and municipality in Oaxaca in south-western Mexico. The municipality covers an area of 366.16 km^{2}. It is part of Cuicatlán District in the north of the Cañada Region.

As of 2005, the municipality had a total population of 2,914.

== Demographics ==
According to the 2020 Mexican census, San Juan Tepeuxila had a population of 2,692 inhabitants, comprising 1,388 men (51.6%) and 1,304 women (48.4%). The population decreased by approximately 2.9% between 2010 and 2020. Indigenous languages remain widely spoken in the municipality, with approximately 1,700 residents aged three and older reporting that they spoke an indigenous language. Children aged 10 to 14 represented the largest five-year age group, accounting for 269 inhabitants.
