= Huautla de Jiménez =

- Municipality
- Sistema Huautla caves

- Location within Mexico Location within Oaxaca
- Coordinates: 18°7′53″N 96°50′27″W
- Country: Mexico
- State: Oaxaca
- Municipal seat: Huautla de Jiménez
- Largest city: Huautla de Jiménez

Area
  - Total: 71.45 km^{2} (27.59 sq mi)

Population (2005)
  - Total: 31,829
  - Density: 445.5/km^{2} (1,154/sq mi)
- Data source: INEGI
- Time zone: UTC-6 (CST)

Huautla de Jimenez is a town and municipality in the Mexican state of Oaxaca. It is part of the Teotitlán District in the north of the Cañada Region.

The name Huautla comes from the Náhuatl. The town is called "Tejao" (also Eagle's Nest) in the Mazatec language. "De Jiménez" was added to honor General Mariano Jiménez, who was the first governor of the state of Oaxaca in 1884 and the first official to arrive on Mazateca lands. He founded the town Huautla de Jiménez, which is now the municipality's seat.

The origin of the town is unknown, but tribute documents show that it was the largest town in the Mazatec region during the late Postclassic period, when the town paid tribute to the Aztec empire.

== The municipality ==
=== Geography ===
The municipality possesses a territorial extent of 71.45 km^{2}. It is located to the northwest of the capital of the state of Oaxaca and it bordered to the north by Santa María Chilchotla and San José Tenango. Tehuacan is the nearest city and about 4 hours away. The height above sea level varies from San Andrés Hidalgo at 1,820 meters to Rio Santiago at 1,180 meters above sea level. The municipal seat has an altitude of 1,560 meters above sea level. The orography corresponds to the Sierra Madre de Oaxaca, whose topographic relief is extremely broken and formed by hills of different altitudes. The municipality does not have large rivers, merely fast currents, including Saint Augustine, which disappears into an underground cavity called "The Basement of San Agustín", the Santiago River, the Escondido River, the San Lucas River, the San Mateo River and the Santa Cruz, tributaries of the Aguaje River which later flows into the deep tributary river of the Papaloapam. The municipality lacks lakes, but has innumerable water eyes and streams, especially during the rainy season, as well as waterfalls of which the most important is "La Regadera" located on the road leading from Jim's Huautla.

The municipality has a series of caves which are the deepest in the Western Hemisphere, including Sistema Huautla, Gruta Nindo Da-Ge, Sistema Cheve and the Sótano de San Agustín, which are well known in the caving world. It also has natural springs with crystal-blue waters.

=== Climate ===
The climate is semi-humid with rains year round in half of the Municipal area, sub-humid with rains in summer in about 6% of the municipal area, and humid temperate with abundant rainfall in summer in 43% of the Municipal area. The climate is generally considered as humid-temperate with rain most of the year, with the exception of a short hot and rainy season between the months of March and May. As of 2005 the average rainfall varied between 244 and 406 cm^{3} per year; in the evenings and occasionally throughout the day, the Municipality is covered by large mists, most likely due to that the Sierra Mazateca serving as a gateway to the great winds coming from the Gulf of Mexico causing cloudy formations and rainstorms. As of 2005, the ambient temperature of Huautla was 18.9 °C on average; the lowest recorded has been of 4 °C during the winter season and maximum of 37 °C during the dry season.

=== Administration ===
According to the INEGI census of 2005, the total population of the municipality was 31,829 inhabitants. The following communities fall under the governing jurisdiction of the town/municipality:

5 de Mayo, Agua Arco Iris, Agua Álamo, Agua Cabeza de León, Agua Canoa, Agua Caracol, Agua Catitla, Agua de Álamo 1, Agua de Álamo 2, Agua de Carrizo, Agua de Cedro, Agua de Cerro, Agua de Cuerno, Agua de Cueva 1, Agua de Cueva 2, Agua de Estrella, Agua de Flor, Agua de Guayaba, Agua de Hueso (1 ra. Sección), Agua de Hueso (2a. Sección), Agua de la Rosa, Agua de las Flores, Agua de Llano, Agua de Lluvia, Agua de Pluma, Agua de Pozol (San Ramón), Agua de Tierra 1, Agua de Tierra 2, Agua de Tigre, Agua de Tijera, Agua de Tinta, Agua de Yerba Santa, Agua del Monte, Agua Elite (Zoo Yaá n´de), Agua Escalera, Agua Flor Fría 1, Agua Flor Fría 2, Agua Hundida, Agua Iglesia, Agua Neblina, Agua Palmera, Agua Pegado, Agua Sangre, Agua Temazcal, Barranca Seca, Barrio Loma Fortín, Camino Viejo Ayautla, Campo de Aviación Lázaro Cárdenas, Cerro Golondrina, Cerro Iglesia, Cerro Mejía, Cerro Ocote, Cerro Panteón, Cerro Zongolica, Colonia del Valle, Colonia San Rafael, Cruz de Fierro, El Carrizal, Encinal Huautla, Faustino Carrera (Rancho Encinal), Hilatepec Huautla de Jiménez, La Finca, La Providencia, Llano de Águila, Llano de Cedro, Llano de Cedro, Llano de Lodo, Llano Verde, Llano Viejo, Loma Alta, Loma Chapultepec, Loma Chilar, Loma de la Plaza, Loma de Panteón, Loma de Pasto, Loma Frutilla, Loma Maguey, Loma Nazareno, Loma Nopal, Los Pinos, Netzahualcóyotl, Nuevo Progreso 1, Nuevo Progreso 2, Palo de Marca, Patio Iglesia, Peña Campana, Peña del Sol, Peña Verde, Piedra Alta, Piedra Colorada, Plan Carlota, Plan de Arena, Plan de Basura, Plan de Escoba, Plan de Joya, Plan de Lecho, Plan de Ocote, Poza Rica San Andrés, Rancho de Cura, Rancho la Mina, Río Santiago, San Agustín Zaragoza, San Andrés Hidalgo, San Felipe, San Pedro del Río, Santa Catarina Buenavista, Santa Clara, Santa Cruz de Juárez, Sitio Largo, Villa Alta, Xochitonalco, and Zongolica

=== Economy ===
The main mineral resource is lime, which is exploited at a minimal proportion. In terms of natural resources, the forest represents 75% of the municipal area and mainly consists of liquidambar and holly oaks used as a utility; natural forest represents 4% of the Municipal area, consisting mainly of turpentine tree Bursera simaruba, the xochicuahuil and the jobo; only 16% of the municipal area is used for agriculture, main crop being corn for sustenance and coffee, sugar cane and fruit as a cash crop. Principal economic activities besides agriculture are ranching and retail. Ranching consists of goats, cows, pigs, horses and mules. Retail stores include food shops, fruit and vegetable stands, butchers, stores for clothes, footwear, newspapers and magazines.

== The town ==
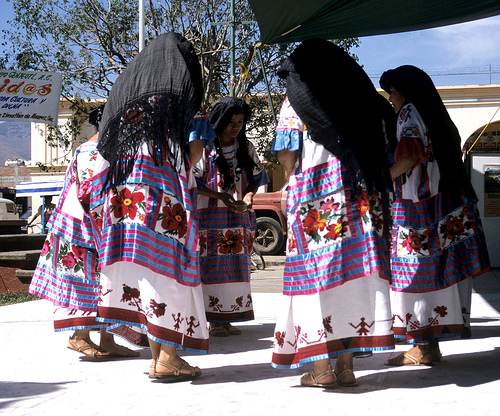
Mazatec women dancing in Huautla de Jimenez

Huautla de Jiménez is noted as the birthplace of María Sabina, a Mazatec curandera famous for her use of Psilocybe mushrooms. After publication of an article titled "Seeking the Magic Mushroom," by Robert Gordon Wasson in Life magazine's May 13, 1957 issue, a number of famous people—including John Lennon and Bob Dylan—are alleged to have visited Huautla de Jimenez, seeking the spiritual guidance of Maria Sabina and other shamanic curers. Tourist attractions include the waterfall of the watering-can, the hill of Adoration, and the caves of San Antonio and San Agustín. People also visit the town to buy brightly colored hand-woven fabrics made by the native Mazatec women, and to consume the endemic entheogenic fungi, especially the Psilocybe mushrooms.
