= Santa María Tlalixtac =

- Municipality and town
- Location in Mexico
- Coordinates: 17°57′N 96°44′W
- Country: Mexico
- State: Oaxaca
- Time zone: UTC-6 (Central Standard Time)

Santa María Tlalixtac is a town and municipality in Oaxaca in south-western Mexico. The municipality covers an area of km^{2}. It is part of Cuicatlán District in the north of the Cañada Region.
