= Tenango de Doria =

- Town and municipality
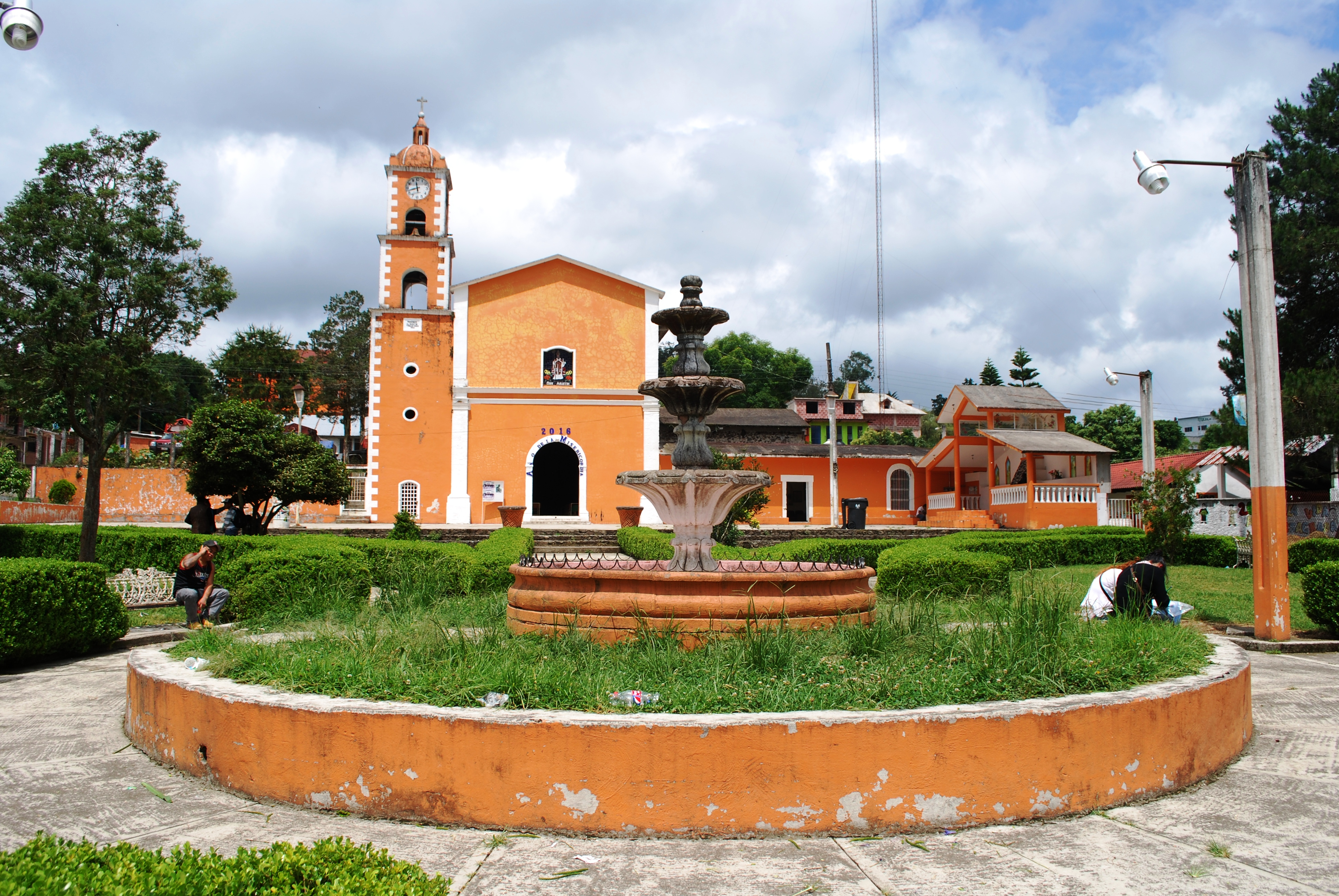
- Main square

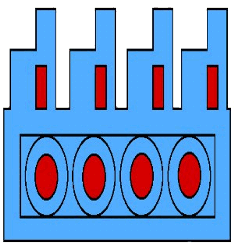
- Coat of arms

- Location within Hidalgo Location within Mexico
- Coordinates: 20°20′08″N 98°13′36″W
- Country: Mexico
- State: Hidalgo
- Municipality: Tenango de Doria

Government
  - Federal electoral district: Hidalgo's 4th

Area
  - Total: 210.7 km^{2} (81.4 sq mi)

Population (2020)
  - Total: 17,503
- Time zone: UTC-6 (Zona Centro)
- Website: tenangodedoria.gob.mx

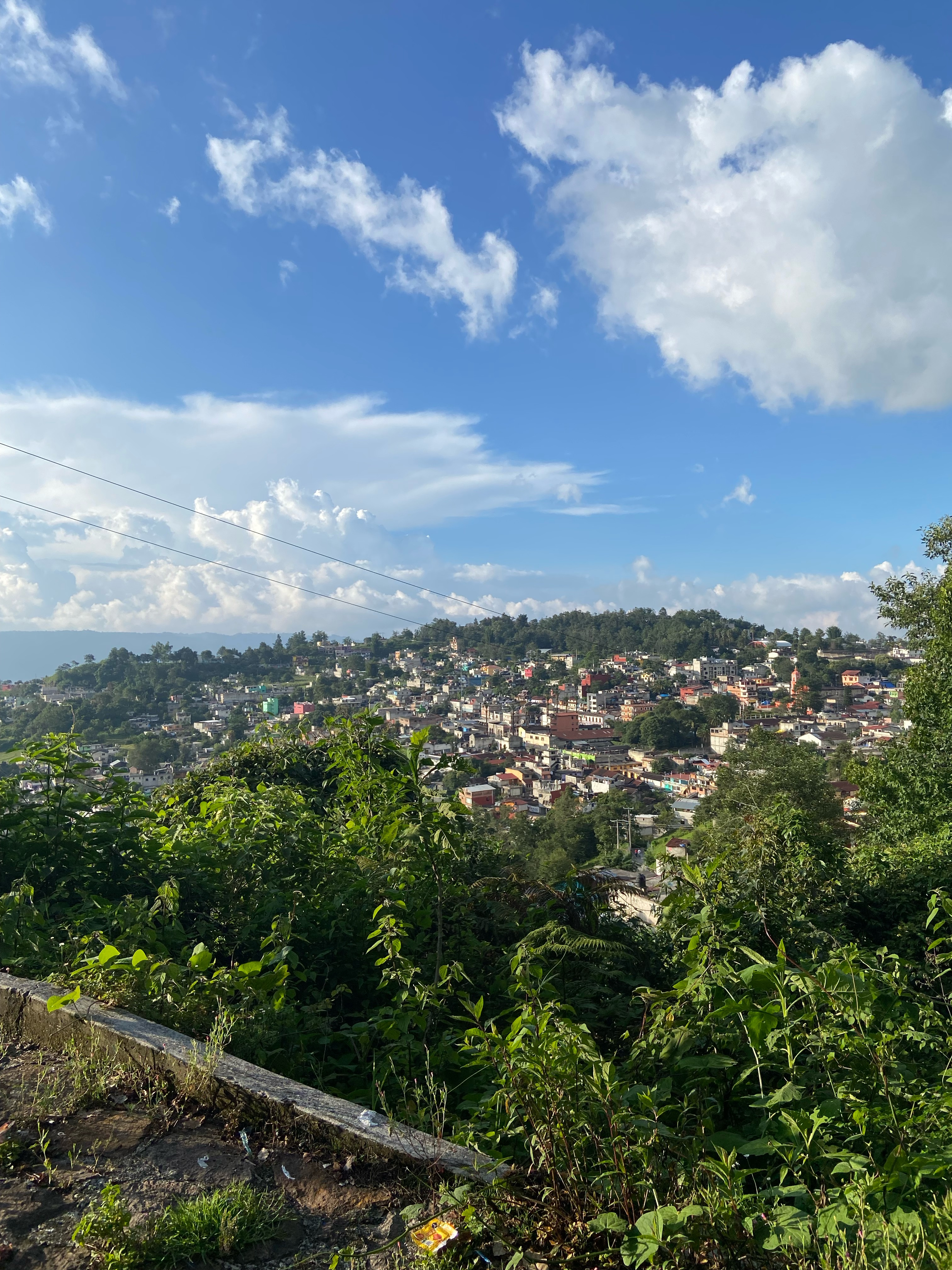
Panoramic View of Tenango de Doria

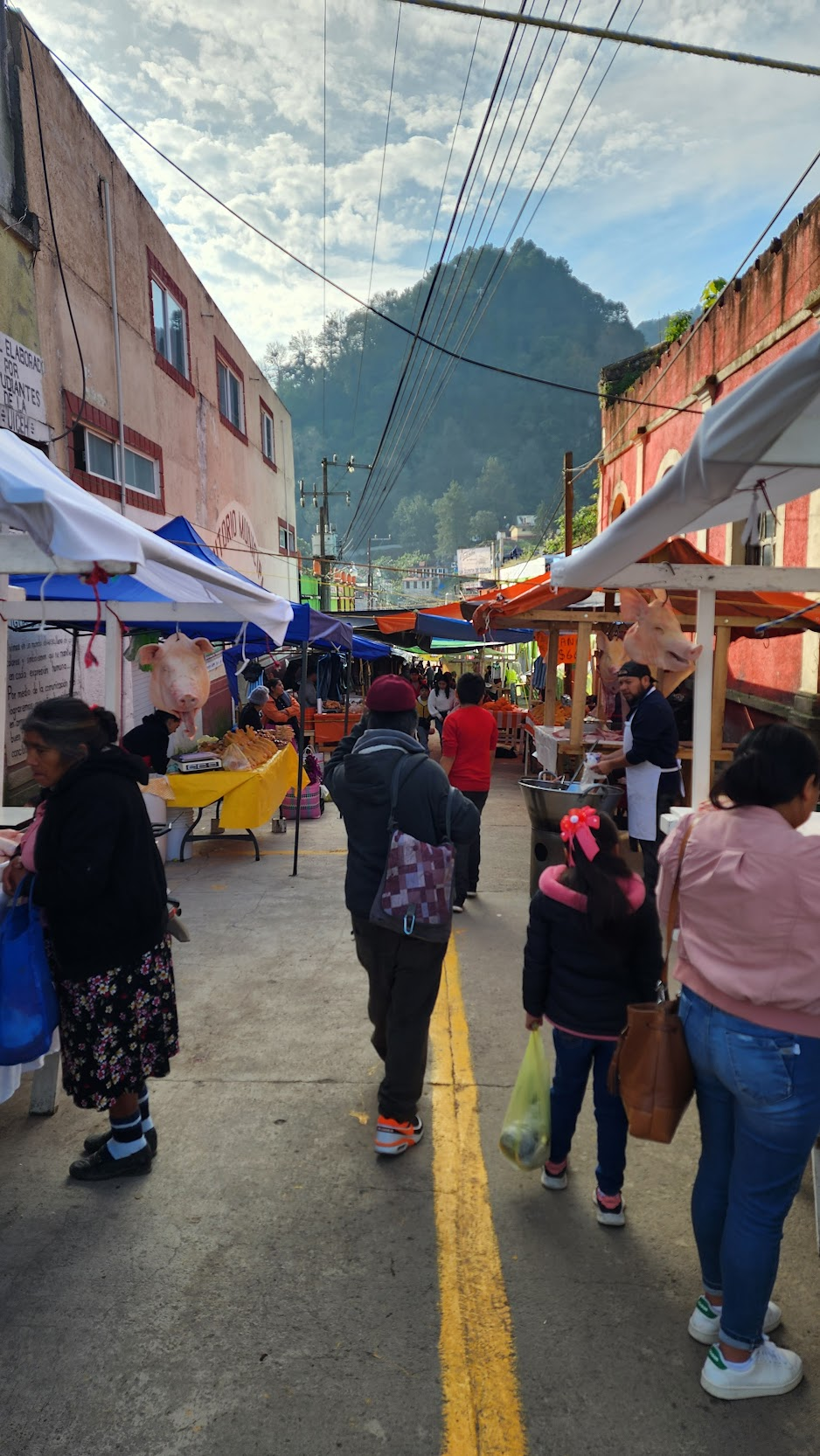
Tenango de Doria's "Plaza" (Market)

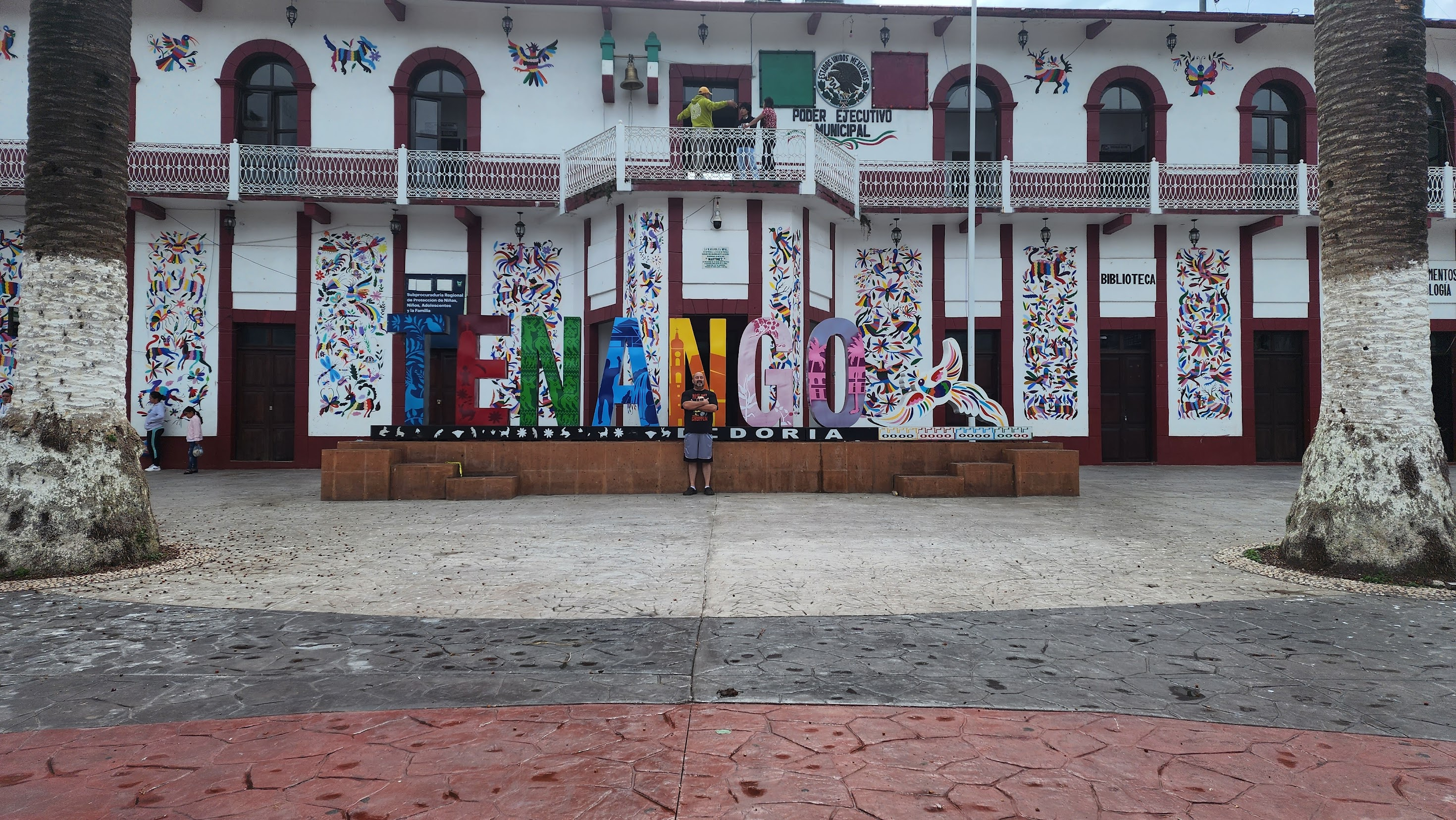
View of Tenango de Doria's sign and city hall

Tenango de Doria is a town and one of the 84 municipalities of Hidalgo, in central-eastern Mexico. The municipality covers an area of 210.7 square kilometers (81.4 sq mi).

As of 2020, the municipality had a total population of 17,503. In 2017 there were 5,030 inhabitants who spoke an indigenous language, primarily Sierra Otomi and Nahuatl.

The municipality is located to the east of Hidalgo between the parallels 20° 15' and 20° 25' of north latitude; the meridians 98° 05' and 98° 20' of west longitude. Its elevation is between 700 and 2,800 meters (2,300–9,200 ft) above sea level. This municipality has an area of 176.61 square kilometers (68.19 sq mi) and accounts for 0.85% of the state’s area, within the geographical region known as Sierra de Tenango.

== Toponymy ==
The name Tenango (or Tenanco) is of Nahuatl origin and means 'in the place of walls', from Nahuatl languages: tenamitl, lit. 'wall' and the locative element co. The suffix de Doria was added in honor of Juan Crisóstomo Doria, the first governor of the state of Hidalgo.

=== Symbols ===
The municipality's emblem represents a wall with upward projections that resemble battlements, with a lower wall with four circles.

== Geography ==
=== Terrain ===
Tenango de Doria is located within the provinces of Sierra Madre Oriental (99.0%) and the Trans-Mexican Volcanic Belt (1.0%); within the subprovince of Carso Huasteco (99.0%), Plains and Sierras of Querétaro and Hidalgo (1.0%). Its terrain is mainly sierra (mountainous) (98.0%), with some plains (1.0%), and plateaus (1.0%). Of the higher elevations found in the municipality, the cerros (hills) of Estribo, Brujo, Debosda el Crío, Macho and the Cuchilla are all at higher than 1,000 meters (3,300 ft) above sea level.

Its geology corresponds to the Jurassic period (34.0%), Cretaceous period (33.0%), Neogene period (31.64%), and Triassic period (1.0%). For igneous rock types, the percentages are as follows: acidic tufts (29.64%), and basalt (3.0%). For sedimentary rock types: limestone (33.0%), sandstone shale (27.0%) limestone-shale (6.0%), and sandstone conglomerate (1.0%). Regarding edaphology, the soil is classified mainly as luvisol (86.64%), regosol (5.0%), and cambisol (8.0%).

=== Hydrology ===
This municipality is located in the hydrological region of Tuxpan-Nautla (97.0%), and of the Pánuco River (3.0%); in the basins of the Tuxpan River (76.0%), Cazones River (21.0%), and the Moctezuma River (3.0%); in the sub-basin of the Pantepec River (76.0%), the San Marcos River (21.0%), and Metztitlán River (3.0%).

The water streams that flow through this area are:

- Tenango
- la Ardilla ('the Squirrel')
- San Francisco
- Agua Grande ('large water')
- Carrizal
- Arenal
- Camarones
- Cuarco
- los María ('the María')
- Cerro Viejo ('old hill')
- Cerro Blanco ('white hill')
- Pie del Cerro ('foot of the hill')
- and Mesillas.

== Demographics ==
According to the results presented by the Census of Population and Housing 2020 from National Institute of Statistics and Geography (INEGI), the municipality has a total of 17,503 inhabitants, with 8,395 men and 9,108 women. There is a population density of 99.1 inhabitants per square kilometer (257/sq mi), with half of the population being 27 years or younger. There are 92 men for every 100 women.

The percentage of the population that speaks an indigenous language is 26.36%. Mainly Sierra Otomi is spoken in this municipality (98.6%), with some people speaking Nahuatl (0.9%). The percentage of the population that is considered Afro-Mexican or Afro-descendant is 1.61%.

=== Localities ===
As of 2020, according to the Catalog of Localities, this municipality has at least 59 localities.

Demographic detail for localities
| INEGI Code | Locality | Population (2020) | Percentage (%) | Population setting | Population category |
|---|---|---|---|---|---|
| 130600001 | Tenango de Doria | 2614 | 14.93 | Urban | Municipal head |
| 130600037 | Santa Mónica | 1381 | 7.89 | Rural | Community |
| 130600034 | San Nicolás | 1322 | 7.55 | Rural | Community |
| 130600010 | El Damo | 996 | 5.69 | Rural | Community |
| 130600061 | San José | 945 | 5.40 | Rural | Community |
| 130600035 | San Pablo el Grande | 793 | 4.53 | Rural | Community |
| 130600036 | Santa María Temaxcalapa | 588 | 3.36 | Rural | Community |
| 130600009 | La Cruz de Tenango | 514 | 2.94 | Rural | Community |
| 130600006 | Cerro Chiquito | 464 | 2.65 | Rural | Farm |
| 130600012 | El Dequeña | 452 | 2.58 | Rural | Farm |
| 130600023 | El Nanthe | 445 | 2.54 | Rural | Farm |
| 130600020 | Ejido López Mateos (La Colonia) | 436 | 2.49 | Rural | Farm |
| 130600032 | San Francisco la Laguna | 397 | 2.27 | Rural | Farm |
| 130600004 | El Bopo | 332 | 1.90 | Rural | Farm |
| 130600026 | Peña Blanca | 316 | 1.81 | Rural | Farm |
| 130600002 | El Aguacate | 314 | 1.79 | Rural | Farm |
| 130600043 | El Xuthi | 306 | 1.75 | Rural | Farm |
| 130600040 | El Texme | 303 | 1.73 | Rural | Farm |
| 130600022 | Agua Zarca | 279 | 1.59 | Rural | Farm |
| 130600051 | Palo Gacho | 279 | 1.59 | Rural | Farm |
| 130600038 | El Temapá | 255 | 1.46 | Rural | Farm |
| 130600005 | El Casiu | 235 | 1.34 | Rural | Farm |
| 130600019 | San Isidro la Laguna | 226 | 1.29 | Rural | Farm |
| 130600062 | La Loma | 215 | 1.23 | Rural | Farm |
| 130600033 | San José del Valle | 204 | 1.17 | Rural | Farm |
| 130600015 | El Gosco | 199 | 1.14 | Rural | Farm |
| 130600029 | El Progreso | 190 | 1.09 | Rural | Farm |
| 130600044 | El Zetoy | 188 | 1.07 | Rural | Farm |
| 130600011 | El Desdavi | 171 | 0.98 | Rural | Farm |
| 130600031 | San Francisco Ixmiquilpan | 166 | 0.95 | Rural | Farm |
| 130600052 | El Tenexco | 155 | 0.89 | Rural | Farm |
| 130600030 | La Reforma | 155 | 0.89 | Rural | Farm |
| 130600058 | La Palizada | 151 | 0.86 | Rural | Farm |
| 130600003 | Los Ahilares | 139 | 0.79 | Rural | Farm |
| 130600048 | Linda Vista | 122 | 0.70 | Rural | Farm |
| 130600054 | El Xindhó | 116 | 0.66 | Rural | Farm |
| 130600016 | Huasquilla | 114 | 0.65 | Rural | Farm |
| 130600049 | El Lindero | 110 | 0.63 | Rural | Farm |
| 130600068 | La Loma del Progreso | 97 | 0.55 | Rural | Farm |
| 130600047 | Las Juntas | 93 | 0.53 | Rural | Farm |
| 130600055 | Ejido Emiliano Zapata | 92 | 0.53 | Rural | Farm |
| 130600067 | Colonia Ermita | 88 | 0.50 | Rural | Farm |
| 130600027 | Los Planes de Santiago | 80 | 0.46 | Rural | Farm |
| 130600060 | El Barrio de San José | 63 | 0.36 | Rural | Farm |
| 130600014 | El Dexhuadá | 63 | 0.36 | Rural | Farm |
| 130600053 | El Tramo | 63 | 0.36 | Rural | Farm |
| 130600057 | El Xaja | 61 | 0.35 | Rural | Farm |
| 130600021 | El Mamay | 48 | 0.27 | Rural | Farm |
| 130600050 | El Madhó | 42 | 0.24 | Rural | Farm |
| 130600066 | Piedras Negras | 35 | 0.20 | Rural | Farm |
| 130600064 | El Dixoy | 34 | 0.19 | Rural | Farm |
| 130600065 | La Joya | 28 | 0.16 | Rural | Farm |
| 130600059 | El Juanthe | 7 | 0.04 | Rural | Farm |
| 130600024 | El Ñanjuay | 7 | 0.04 | Rural | Farm |
| 130600013 | El Despi | 5 | 0.03 | Rural | Farm |
| 130600008 | La Concepción (El Carrizal) | 4 | 0.02 | Rural | Farm |
| 130600069 | La Palma | 3 | 0.02 | Rural | Farm |
| 130600045 | Cerro Grande | 2 | 0.01 | Rural | Farm |
| 130600028 | El Potrero | 1 | 0.01 | Rural | Farm |

== Arts and culture ==
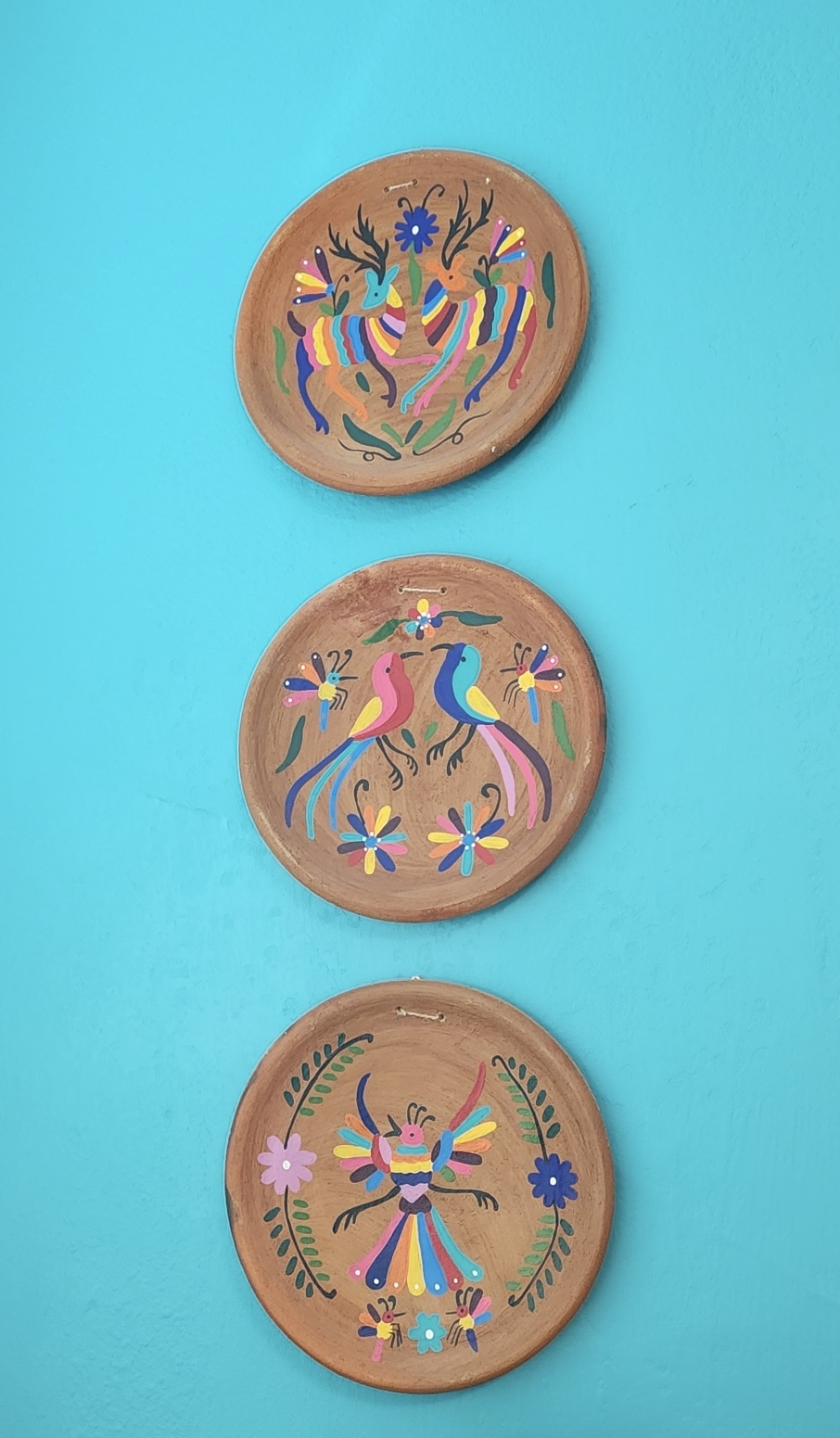
Tenango embroidery style on clay dishes

Tenango de Doria is renowned for its vibrant Tenango embroidery and textiles. Tenangos (or tenancos) are art pieces which are a part of the municipality's history. It is most notable as it has spread to other parts of Mexico, and the world. Not only that, but the Tenango embroidery style has expanded to be applied to other art mediums. Local artisans in Tenango de Doria have used these colorful designs and applied to them to "barro" (clay) dishware, such as plates and teapots.

Tenango de Doria's center of community is found in its municipal hall that has been renovated over the years. This building decorated with flora and fauna that is depicted in the traditional Tenango style reflects the municipality's identity and community. There are large, colorful, Tenango de Doria letters that are set up in front of the city hall's entrance and library. The street that the city hall is located at is also where weekly "plazas" (markets) are set up: each Sunday, vendors set up their stalls and townspeople join to buy products. These goods range from small toys and ice cream, to fresh fruit and meat, to sponges and shoes.

Other notable features and touristic attractions in this town are the Church of San Agustín, built in 1891, and the cerros (hills) Brujo, el Arco, and el Cirio.
