= San Jerónimo Tecoatl =

- Municipality and town
- Location in Mexico
- Coordinates: 18°10′N 96°55′W
- Country: Mexico
- State: Oaxaca

Area
  - Total: 17.86 km^{2} (6.90 sq mi)

Population (2005)
  - Total: 1,522
- Time zone: UTC-6 (Central Standard Time)

San Jerónimo Tecoatl is a town and municipality in Oaxaca in south-western Mexico. The municipality covers an area of 17.86 square kilometres (6.90 sq mi). It is part of the Teotitlán District in the north of the Cañada Region.

In 2005, the municipality had a population of 1,522.
