= Santa María Ixcatlán =

Santa María Ixcatlan
- Municipality and town
- Location in Mexico
- Coordinates: 17°51′N 97°11′W
- Country: Mexico
- State: Oaxaca

Area
  - Total: 201.58 km^{2} (77.83 sq mi)
- Elevation: 1,840 m (6,040 ft)

Population (2005)
  - Total: 573
- Time zone: UTC-6 (Central Standard Time)

Santa María Ixcatlan is a town and municipality in Oaxaca in southeastern Mexico and is the second least densely populated municipality in Oaxaca behind Santa María Chimalapa. It is part of the Teotitlán District in the north of the Cañada Region.

== Geography ==
The municipality has an area of 201.58 km^{2} at an elevation of 1,840 meters above sea level. In the settled areas the climate is hot and humid with abundant rainfall in summer. Other areas are arid with little rainfall.

=== Flora and fauna ===
Trees include morillo, oak and juniper, and fruit-bearing peach, apricot, pomegranates, figs and hawthorn. Local birds include chachalaca, quail, dove, sparrow, goldfinch, orioles, hawks and eagles. Wild life includes coyote, fox, wild cat, wild boar, badger, rattlesnake, coral snake, lizards and scorpions.

== Demographics ==
As of 2005, the municipality had a total population of 573, of whom 37 people spoke an indigenous language. The town is the only one inhabited by speakers of the Ixcatec language. According to the Consejo Nacional para la Cultura y las Artes, there were only 8 speakers of the Ixcateco (Xwja) language in 2008. Most of the population is engaged in cultivation of maize, beans, wheat and barley, and also in manufacture of artisan products made from palms. There is small-scale animal husbandry of goat, cattle, horses and donkeys.

== Economy ==
Mezcal is produced in the village.
