= San Lucas Zoquiapam =

- Municipality and town
- Location in Mexico
- Coordinates: 18°08′N 96°55′W
- Country: Mexico
- State: Oaxaca

Area
  - Total: 38.27 km^{2} (14.78 sq mi)

Population (2005)
  - Total: 7,384
- Time zone: UTC-6 (Central Standard Time)

San Lucas Zoquiapam is a town and municipality in Oaxaca in south-western Mexico. The municipality covers an area of 38.27 km^{2}. It is part of the Teotitlán District in the north of the Cañada Region.

As of 2005, the municipality had a total population of 7,384.

== History ==
In prehispanic times, Zoquiapam was subject to Teococuilco and its patron deity was Coqui Nexo, the "lord of multiplication".
