= Tenango embroidery =

Mexican embroidery style

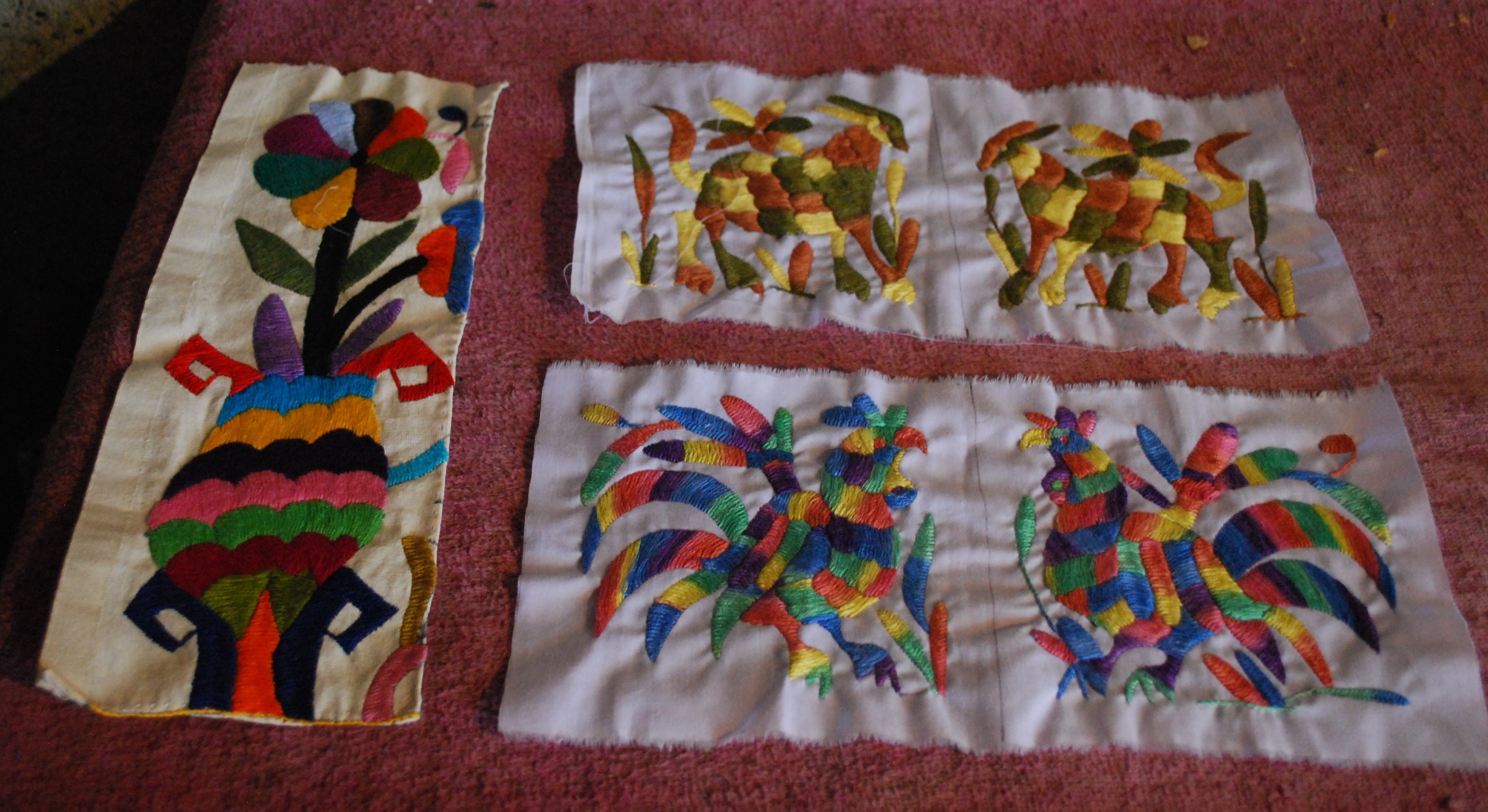
Small panels of tenango embroidery showing detail done by Elvira Clemente Gomez of Santa Monica, Tenango de Doria

Tenango is a style of embroidery which originated in the Tenango de Doria municipality in the Mexican state of Hidalgo. It is a commercialized version of traditional Otomi embroidery, which was developed in the 1960s in response to an economic crisis. It is estimated that over 1,200 artisans practice the craft in Tenango de Doria and the neighborhing municipality of San Bartolo Tutotepec.

== Geographic origin ==
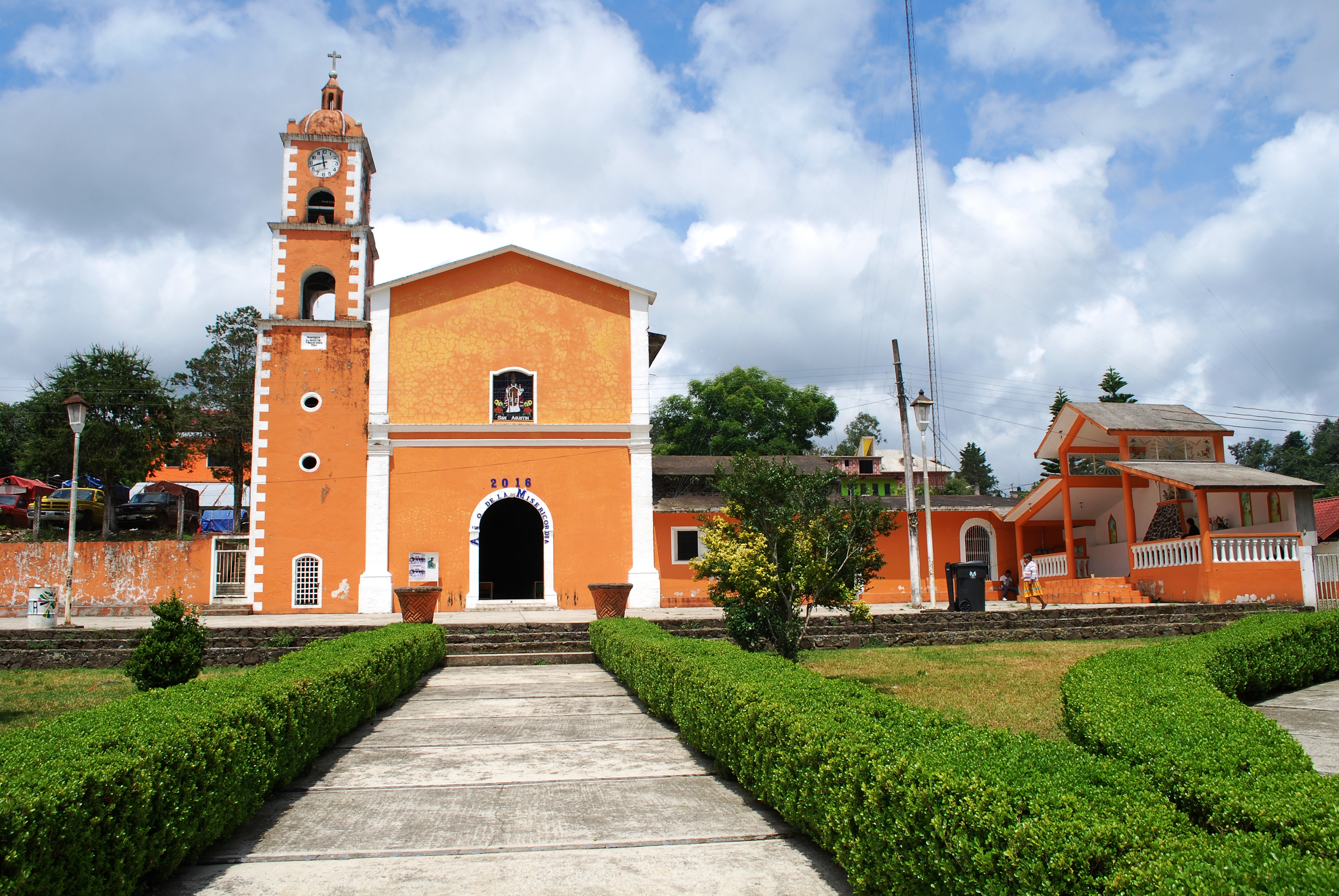
Parish church of Tenango de Doria

Modern authentic tenango embroidery is made in San Nicolas municipalities of Tenango de Doria and, to a lesser extent, neighboring San Bartolo Tutotepec. The design and manufacture is associated with the indigenous Otomi people, who call themselves hñuhñu. The Otomi can be found in several states in central Mexico, but the embroidery is endemic only to this area. The region is a bit different than other Otomi areas. Wedged into steep canyons, communities here located in the western Sierra Madre Oriental. As these mountains trap much of the moisture coming off the Gulf of Mexico, the climate here is significantly wetter with more vegetation than other Otomi areas, which has affected the development of embroidery pattern. It has also isolated the people of this area, allowing them to keep much more of the ancient traditions and worldview. In her book Los Tenangos: mitos y ritos bordados: arte textile hidalguense, researcher Carmen Lorenzo characterizes tenangos as a kind of modern-day codex, giving testimony about everyday life of the rural Otomi is this region. The world vision of these pieces are traditional as much of the ancient ideology of these communities remains intact. Many here still speak Otomi, with a portion speaking only this language. Although there is contact with the outside world via the handcraft and migration out, this has affected the development of the craft.

== Description ==
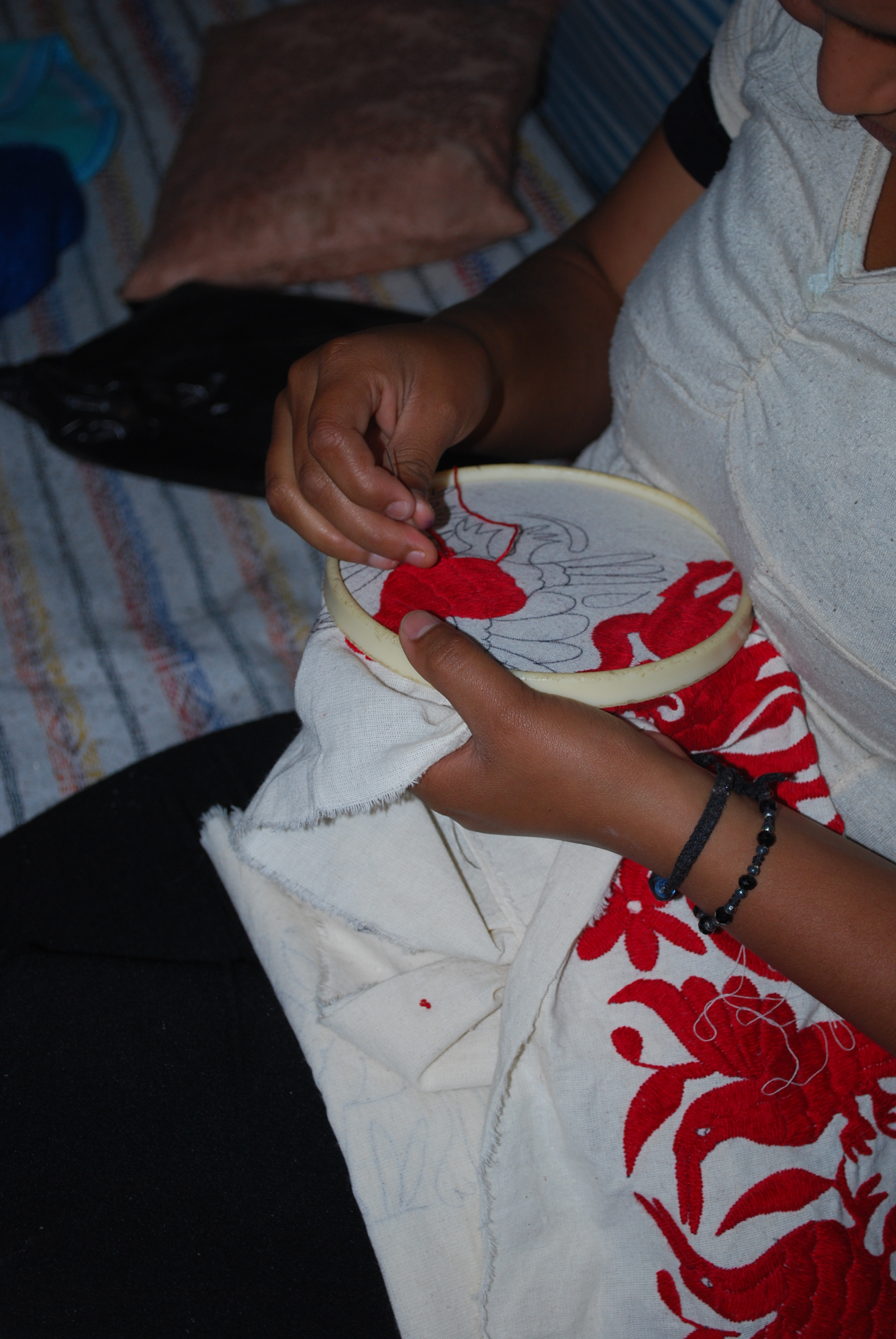
Working on a piece while watching television in the community of Santa Monica, Tenango de Doria

The embroidery is a simplified version of embroidery done for centuries, adapted for products to be sold to the outside world. Pieces generally have multiple figurative elements in stylized form, which are arranged onto the fabric in a geometric pattern, mostly or completely symmetrical. The most common elements are the flora and fauna found in the Tenango de Doria area including chickens, dogs, wild birds, rabbits, horses, flowers and trees. Sometimes people and other objects appear as well. Other figures include figures from amate paper cut-outs made by local shamans/healers and prehistoric paintings found in local caves. These elements are most often arranged in a pattern, but can be set up for form scenes from daily life, folk festival and religion. The most common background fabric colors are white and off-white, generally for tablecloths and the like, followed by black, but other colors such as reds and blues are used as well. Most often, the elements are not done in realistic colors, rather using bright colors such as yellows, greens and blues. All elements may be of a single color, or multicolored. If the latter, the colors are most often combined as a series of stripes over the elements. Better tenangos have small, tight stitches, with a well-done tablecloth or bedspread taking up to six years to make.

== History ==
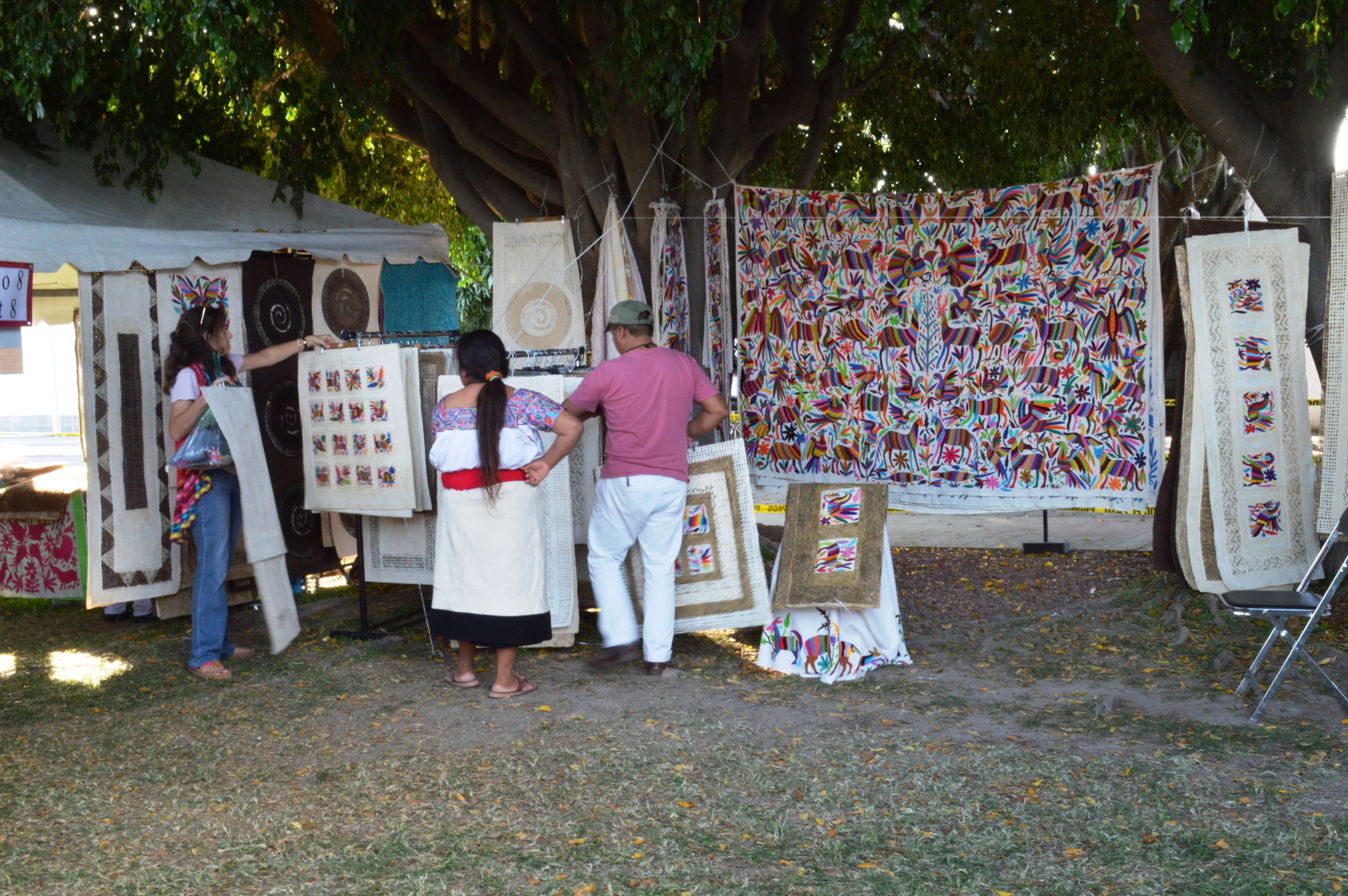
Tenango and amate paper for sale at the Feria Maestros de Arte fair in Chapala, Jalisco

There is evidence that embroidery existed in the pre-Hispanic period in Mesoamerica but it underwent radical change with the introduction of European techniques and designs. It has always been traditionally women's work, with daughters learning from mothers. Even today, most of the work is done within individual families, but there are cooperatives of women who work together to produce and promote their products.

The embroidery style now known as tenango is based on traditional Otomi embroidery of the area, but modified to create pieces to sell. This occurred in the 1960s when a regional drought severely disrupted the local economy's dependence on subsistence agriculture. The origin of this innovation has been traced to the small community of San Nicolas in the municipality of Tenango de Doria. Originally the idea was to make and sell pepenado blouses, a kind of gathered and traditional blouse still worn here. However, these are very time-consuming to make and could not be sold for a sufficient price. Instead, embroidery elements were transferred to flat pieces of fabric. Even those sold for very little, especially at the beginning when the style was unknown. Over time, the embroidery style has been applied to tablecloths, napkins, pillow cases, bedspread, various styles of clothing and more. While the work is still primarily done by women, men have taken it up, not only in Tenango but in prison handcraft programs as well.

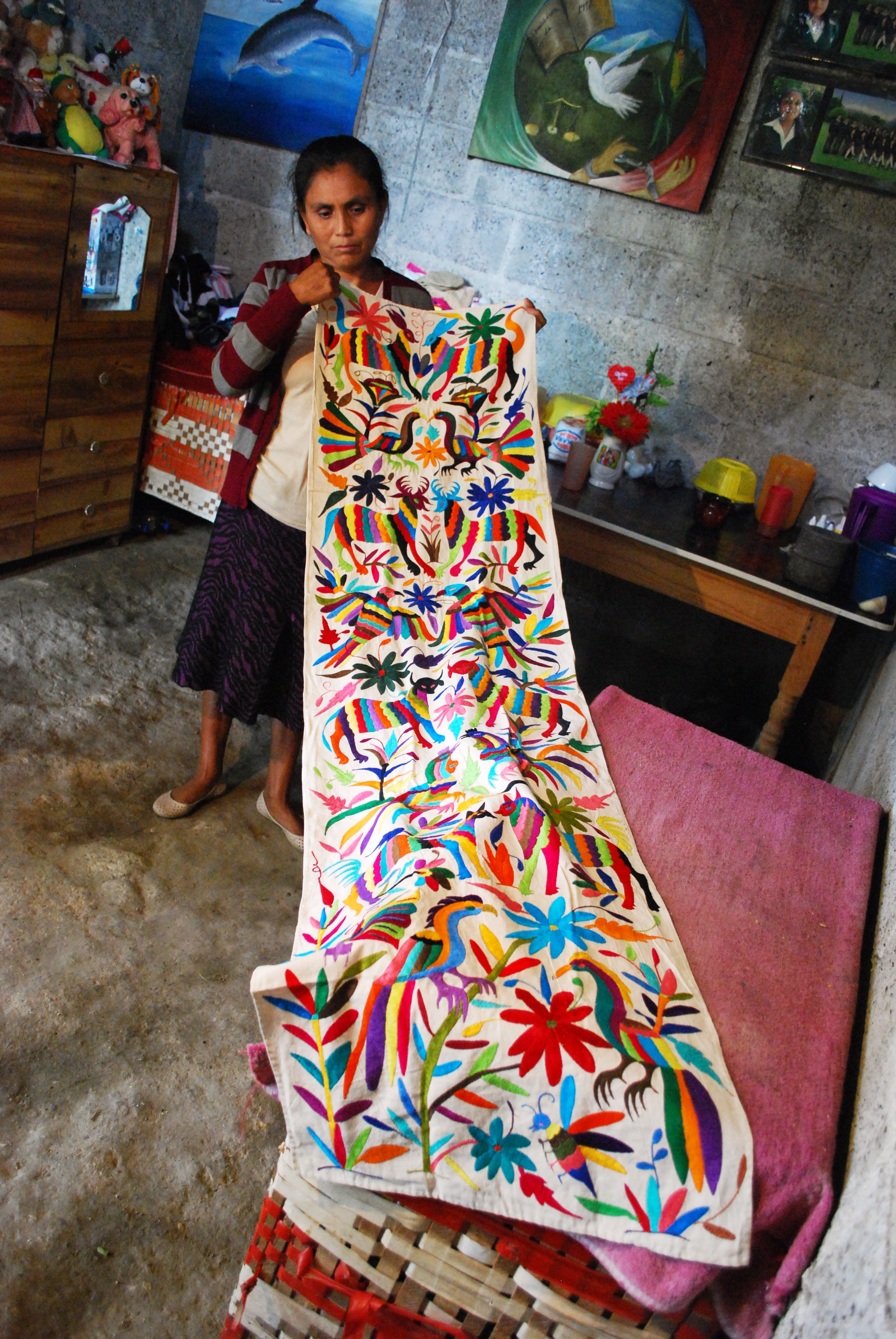
Elvira Clemente Gomez with piece demonstrating life in a coffee-producing village in Hidalgo at her home in Santa Monica, Tenango de Doria

The embroidery has become popular enough to be found in many sales venues in Mexico and regularly shipped abroad. Pieces can sell anywhere from 15 to 10,000 or more Mexican pesos depending on size and quality. They have been sold in upscale hotels and boutiques, with some artisans working with Mexican and foreign designers. For example, in 2011, French fashion label Hermes partnered with the Museo de Arte Popular and various artisans to create reproductions of the embroidery.

However, some of the marketing has been controversial. One of the main problems is that the artisans receive many times less what the piece eventually sells for. Very poor and/or non-Spanish speaking artisans may be exploited, paid as little as 100 pesos for a tablecloth or even exchanging their work for food. It is estimated there are about 1,200 artisans practicing the craft in the municipality, but the number may be much higher as it does not count children as young as five helping with the work. Despite some support from government entities like SEDESOL, the activity pays very little because it is very labor-intensive. Younger generations are not taking it up if they can make more money in another activity. One reason for this is that the design has no legal protection, neither copyright or trademark.
