= Tepeuxila Cuicatec language =

Oto-Manguean language of Oaxaca, Mexico

Tepeuxila Cuicatec
- Native to: Mexico
- Region: Oaxaca
- Ethnicity: Cuicatec
- Native speakers: (8,680 cited 2000)
- Language family: Oto-Manguean: Mixtecan; Tepeuxila Cuicatec
- Writing system: Latin

Language codes
- ISO 639-3: cux
- Glottolog: tepe1280

Tepeuxila Cuicatec is a language spoken in Oaxaca State, Mexico.
