= San Pedro Teutila =

- Municipality and town
- Location in Mexico
- Coordinates: 17°59′N 96°43′W
- Country: Mexico
- State: Oaxaca
- Time zone: UTC-6 (Central Standard Time)

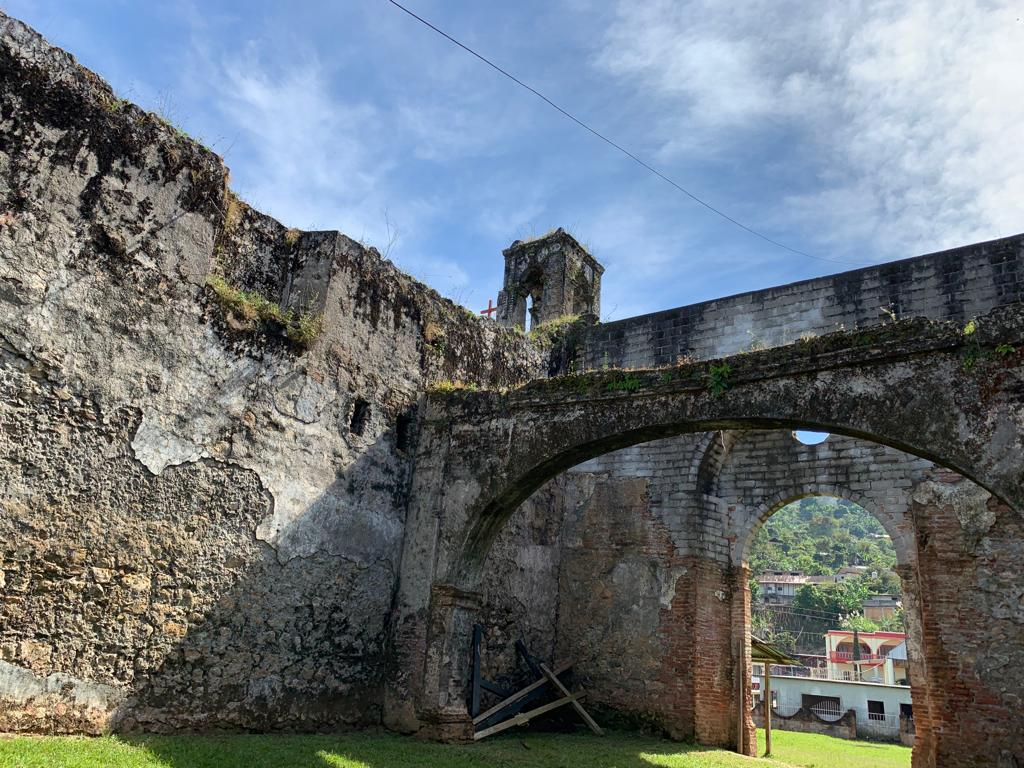
Ruins of an Ancient Temple in Teutila

San Pedro Teutila is a town and municipality in Oaxaca in south-western Mexico. The municipality covers an area of 148 km^{2}. It is part of Cuicatlán District in the south of the Cañada Region.

As of 2010, the municipality had a total population of 4277.
