= Teotitlán District =

- District
- Oaxaca regions and districts: Cañada to the North
- Coordinates: 18°8′N 97°5′W
- Country: Mexico
- State: Oaxaca

Population (2020)
  - Total: 147,891

Teotitlán District (Spanish: Distrito de Teotitlán) is located in the north of the Cañada Region of the State of Oaxaca, Mexico.

== Municipalities ==
The district includes the following municipalities: The district includes the following municipalities:

Municipality code	Name	Population		Land Area			Population density	
Municipality code	Name	2020	Rank	km^{2}	sq mi	Rank	2020	Rank
029	Eloxochitlán de Flores Magón	4,215	8	35.82	13.83	16	118/km^{2} (305/sq mi)	8
040	Huautepec	6,385	7	47.01	18.15	14	136/km^{2} (352/sq mi)	6
041	Huautla de Jiménez	31,710	1	148	57	6	214/km^{2} (555/sq mi)	4
058	Mazatlán Villa de Flores	12,722	4	182.2	70.3	4	70/km^{2} (181/sq mi)	17
109	San Antonio Nanahuatipam	1,232	20	77.20	29.81	9	16/km^{2} (41/sq mi)	23
116	San Bartolomé Ayautla	4,131	9	57.41	22.17	13	72/km^{2} (186/sq mi)	14
142	San Francisco Huehuetlán	842	21	14.26	5.51	20	59/km^{2} (153/sq mi)	19
163	San Jerónimo Tecoatl	1,577	19	17.82	6.88	17	88/km^{2} (229/sq mi)	12
171	San José Tenango	18,102	3	257.9	99.6	3	70/km^{2} (182/sq mi)	15
187	San Juan Coatzospam	1,808	17	66.11	25.53	10	27/km^{2} (71/sq mi)	21
206	San Juan de los Cues	2,421	15	119.5	46.1	8	20/km^{2} (52/sq mi)	22
228	San Lorenzo Cuaunecuiltitla	833	22	9.173	3.542	21	91/km^{2} (235/sq mi)	11
234	San Lucas Zoquiapam	7,163	6	64.95	25.08	11	110/km^{2} (286/sq mi)	9
244	San Martín Toxpalan	3,934	11	64.10	24.75	12	61/km^{2} (159/sq mi)	18
249	San Mateo Yoloxochitlan	3,831	12	7.199	2.780	23	532/km^{2} (1,378/sq mi)	1
322	San Pedro Ocopetatillo	786	23	6.598	2.548	25	119/km^{2} (309/sq mi)	7
354	Santa Ana Ateixtlahuaca	477	24	15.03	5.80	19	32/km^{2} (82/sq mi)	20
374	Santa Cruz Acatepec	1,645	18	7.097	2.740	24	232/km^{2} (600/sq mi)	3
406	Santa María Chilchotla	21,469	2	283.6	109.5	2	76/km^{2} (196/sq mi)	13
416	Santa María Ixcatlán	461	25	177.3	68.5	5	3/km^{2} (7/sq mi)	25
396	Santa María la Asunción	3,259	13	7.593	2.932	22	429/km^{2} (1,112/sq mi)	2
431	Santa María Tecomavaca	1,830	16	371.3	143.4	1	5/km^{2} (13/sq mi)	24
434	Santa María Teopoxco	3,985	10	36.73	14.18	15	108/km^{2} (281/sq mi)	10
490	Santiago Texcalcingo	2,974	14	16.60	6.41	18	179/km^{2} (464/sq mi)	5
545	Teotitlán de Flores Magón	10,099	5	143.9	55.6	7	70/km^{2} (182/sq mi)	16
	Distrito Teotitlán	147,891	—	2,234	862.55	—	66/km^{2} (171/sq mi)	—
Source: INEGI
