= Cañada Region =

Cañada
- Region
- Oaxaco regions - Cañada to the north
- Coordinates: 18°8′N 97°5′W
- Country: Mexico
- State: Oaxaca

Area
  - Total: 4,273 km^{2} (1,650 sq mi)

Population (2005)
  - Total: 196,258

Cañada is a region in the state of Oaxaca, Mexico covering 4,300 square km. It includes two districts, Teotitlán and Cuicatlán. The main administrative center is Teotitlán de Flores Magón, but Huautla de Jiménez is considered the most important cultural center in the region.

The region is named after the Cañada de Cuicatlán, a hot low canyon that links the Valley of Oaxaca to the south with the Valley of Tehuacán in Puebla state to the north. The Cañada was the major Precolumbian route between the two valleys. It was conquered and controlled by the early Zapotec state based on Monte Albán at some time around 300 BC.

The region is fertile with a warm and mild climate, and produces crops of mango, melon and avocado. It consists of flat lands watered by the Salado and Tomellín rivers.
