= Indigenous peoples of Oaxaca =

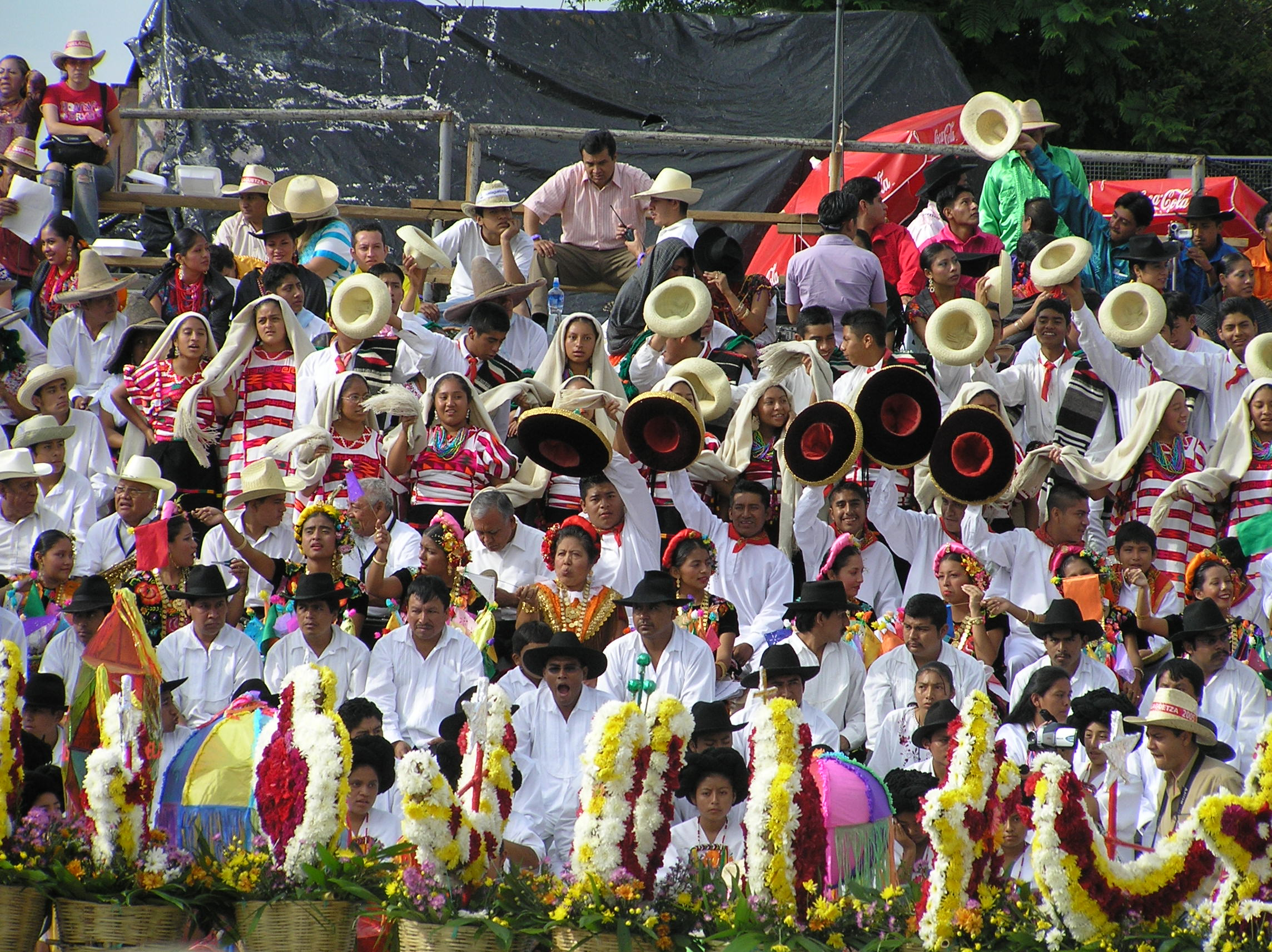
Indigenous people from all parts of Oaxaca participate wearing traditional clothes and artifacts in a celebration known as “Guelaguetza” held every year by mid-July.

The Indigenous people of Oaxaca are descendants of the inhabitants of what is now the state of Oaxaca, Mexico, who were present before the Spanish colonization. Several cultures flourished in the ancient region of Oaxaca from as far back as 2000 BC, of whom the Zapotecs and Mixtecs were perhaps the most advanced, with complex social organization and sophisticated arts.

According to the National Commission for the Development of the Indigenous Peoples (CDI) Oaxaca has the greatest percentage of Indigenous people after Yucatán, at 48% of the population. There are 16 formally registered Indigenous communities, some of which are culturally diverse themselves. Many of the people are socially marginalized, living in poverty.

== Speakers of each language ==
Primary areas occupied by the different Indigenous people in Oaxaca

The 16 groups and the number of speakers of their languages according to the 2005 census are:

- Zapotec – 357,134
- Mixtec – 290,049
- Mazatec – 164,673
- Chinanteco – 104,010
- Mixe – 103,089
- Chatinos – 42,477
- Triqui – 18,292
- Huave – 15,324
- Cuicatecs – 12,128
- Zoque – 10,000 (est)
- Amuzgos – 4,819
- Oaxacan Chontal – 4,610
- Tacuate – 1,726
- Chocho – 524
- Ixcatecos – 207
- Popoloco – 61

Of these, 477,788 are non-Spanish monolingual. The majority of people speak languages of the Oto-Manguean family, either the Popolocan-Zapotecan branch or the Amuzgo-Mixtecan branch.

== Background ==
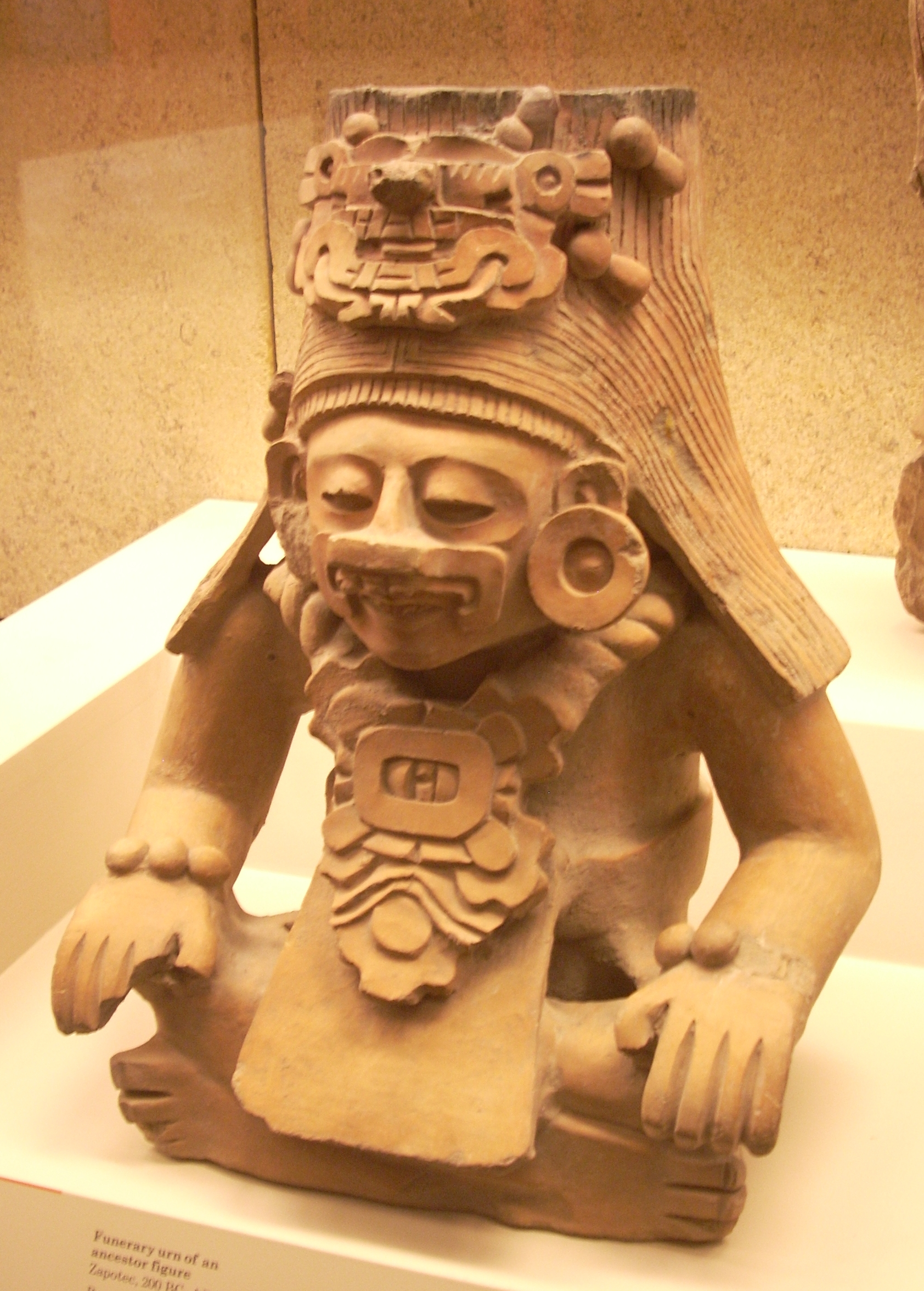
Zapotec funerary urn in the British Museum

The Oaxaca region is at the convergence of the Sierra Madre Oriental and the Sierra Madre del Sur mountain ranges, resulting in a rugged and mountainous terrain with a large, temperate central valley. The climate is temperate, cooler at higher altitudes and warmer by the coast and in the Papaloapan region, which is part of the Gulf of Mexico coastal plain. Oaxaca is the historic home of the Zapotec and Mixtec peoples among others, and contains more speakers of Indigenous languages than any other Mexican state.

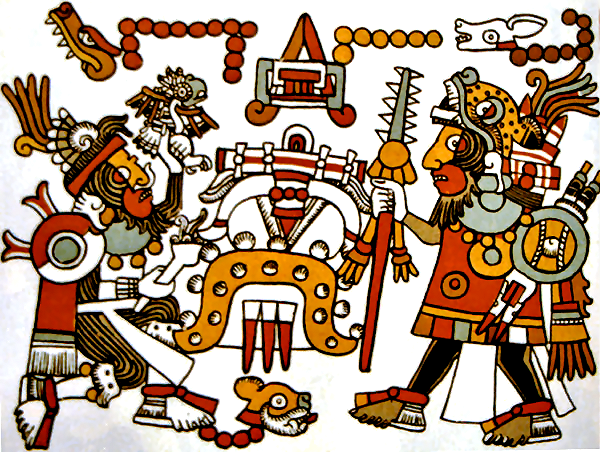
Mixtec king and warlord Eight Deer Jaguar Claw (right) Meeting with Four Jaguar, in a depiction from the precolumbian Codex Zouche-Nuttall.

Excavations have shown that the region has had a settled population for at least 4,000 years. In the pre-Columbian period, the Zapotec developed an advanced civilization centered in Monte Albán in the central valley, which lasted between 300 BC and 700 AD. The state was expansionist, and extended its authority to the north, west, and southwest.

Further to the west, Mixtec settlements have been dated back to 1500 BC, and the Mixtec also developed advanced city states such as Tilantongo and Tututepec. The Mixtec were known for their exceptional mastery of jewelry, in which gold and turquoise figure prominently. Around 1250 AD the Aztecs began pushing down from the North. Mixtec groups in turn invaded the Valley of Oaxaca and established the Cuilapan state. Shortly before the Spanish arrived, most of the west and central areas of Oaxaca had come under Aztec control.

The Aztec empire disintegrated after the fall of their capital of Tenochtitlan to the Spanish in August 1521. The Spanish crown granted Oaxaca to the conquistador Hernán Cortés as his prize. The Spanish introduced new food such as wheat and sugar cane and new methods of cultivation. Diseases introduced by the Spanish greatly diminished the native population of Oaxaca, as did the insatiable appetite for gold, which led more and more Oaxacans into the dangerous mines.

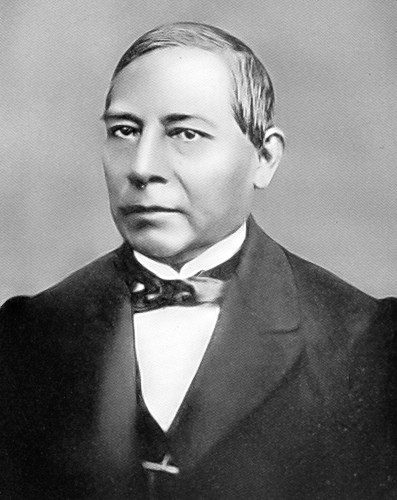
Benito Pablo Juárez, of Zapotec origin, was President of Mexico from 1858 to 1872

Over the 300 years of colonialism, many aspects of life became Europeanized. Important government positions were filled by the Spanish and their descendants, and later by elite mestizos, persons of mixed European and Indigenous ancestry. However, Oaxaca remained largely an agriculture-based economy with little development throughout the colonial period, following Mexican independence in 1821 and following the revolution of 1910. By the 1980s and 1990s, Oaxaca was one of Mexico's poorest states. The state, and the Indigenous people in particular, had some of the nation's highest rates of illiteracy, malnutrition, and infant mortality.

== Oto-Manguean ==
The Oto-Manguean languages are a large family comprising several families of Native American languages, which has not been positively related to any other group of languages. The Oto-Manguean family has existed in southern Mexico at least since 4000 BCE and probably before. The highest number of speakers of these languages are found in Oaxaca where the two largest branches, the Zapotecan and Mixtecan languages, are spoken by almost 1.5 million people combined.

=== Zapotecan group ===
==== Zapotec ====
The Zapotec people are concentrated in Oaxaca, but Zapotec communities exist in neighboring states as well. The present-day population is estimated at 300,000 to 400,000 persons, many of whom are monolingual in one of the native Zapotec languages. In pre-Columbian times the Zapotec civilization was one of the highly developed cultures of Mesoamerica, which among other things included a system of writing.

There are four basic groups of Zapotecs: the istmeños, who live in the southern Isthmus of Tehuantepec the serranos, who live in the northern mountains of the Sierra Madre de Oaxaca, the southern Zapotecs, who live in the southern mountains of the Sierra Sur and the Central Valley Zapotecs, who live in and around the Valley of Oaxaca.

==== Chatino ====
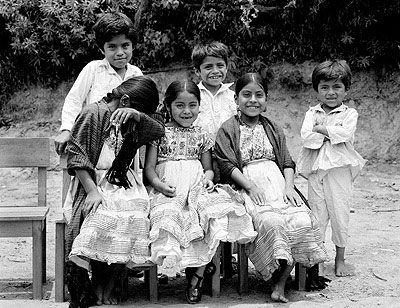
Chatino children

Chatino communities are located in the southeastern region of Oaxaca. Speakers of Chatino languages are numbered around 23,000 (Ethnologue surveys), but ethnic Chatinos may number many more. They call themselves Kitse Cha'tño and their language Cha'tña. Chatino populations are found in the following Oaxacan municipalities, mostly in the area around Juquila: Santos Reyes Nopala, San Juan Quiahije, San Miguel Panixtlahuaca, Santiago Yaitepec, Santa Cruz Zezontepec, San Juan Lachao, Santa María Temaxcaltepec, Santa Catarina Juquila and Tataltepec de Valdés.

The region that the Chatinos inhabit is rich in natural resources. Traditionally many Chatino people have been involved in agriculture which depends very much on the climate, so some Chatinos have had to emigrate to the corners of the district of Juquila to work on coffee plantations. Most Chatino communities have public services, and there are runways for airports in many municipalities. Federal bilingual schools, high schools, and telesecundarias (distance education programs for secondary and high school students) have been established.

The traditional authorities of this people are organized in a system based on civil and religious roles, in which advice from elders is treated as the greatest authority. They believe in the Holy Grandmother, the Holy Father Sun, the Holy Mother Earth, and the Holy Mother Moon. In addition, they worship the deities of water, wind, rain, the mountain, and fire.

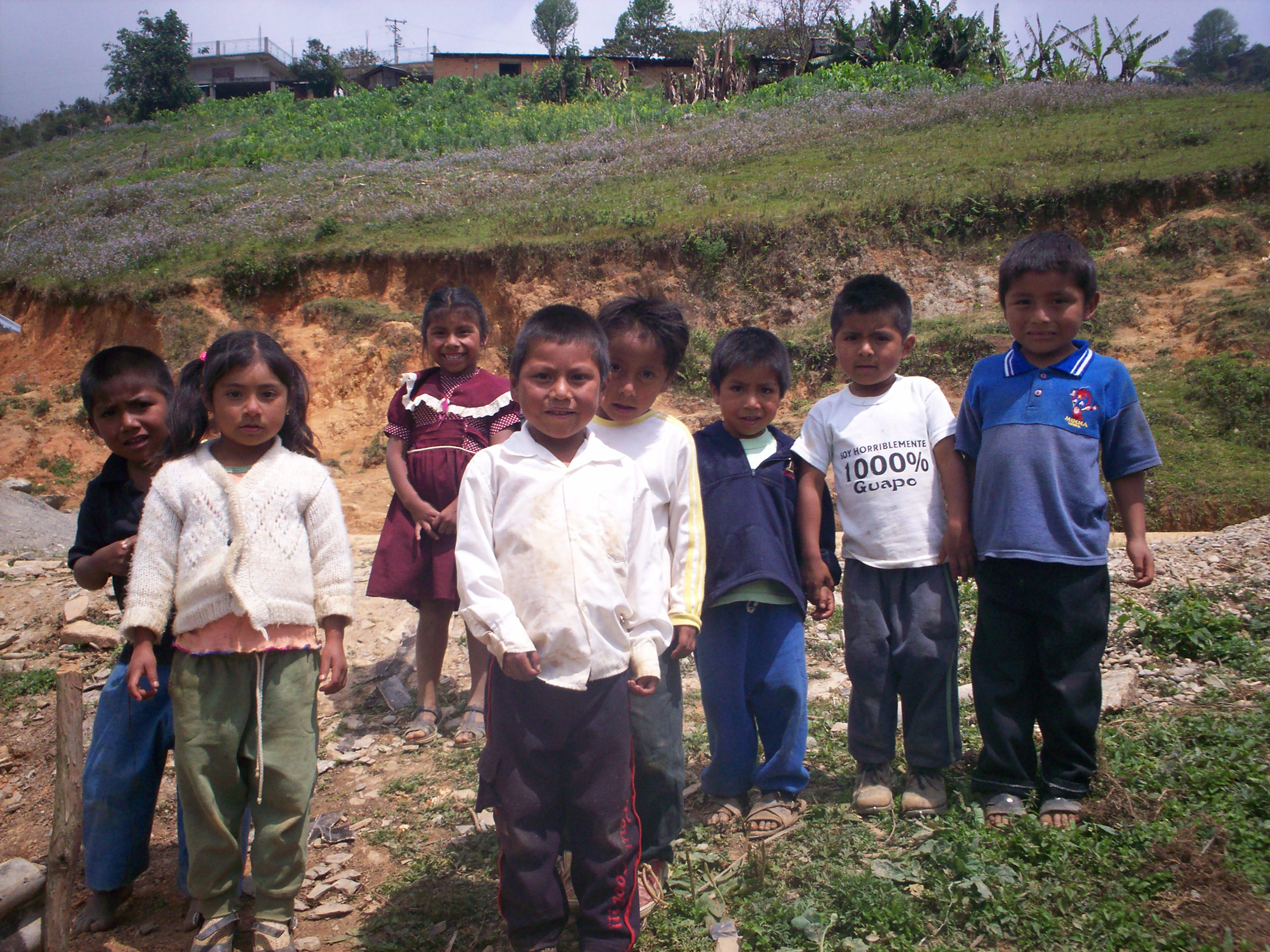
Primary student in Agua Iglesia, in the municipality of Eloxochitlán de Flores Magón

=== Popolocan group ===
==== Mazatec ====
The Mazatec speak a closely related group of languages spoken in the northern part of the state of Oaxaca, and in some communities in the states of Puebla and Veracruz. The name Mazatec is an exonym and comes from Nahuatl, meaning "deer people". The Mazatec people refer to themselves in their own languages as Ha shuta Enima (or other variants), meaning approximately "workers of the mountains, humble people of custom".

The Mazatec shamans are known for their ritual use of psilocybe mushrooms. Some shamans on occasion use other plants, such as Salvia divinorum and morning glory seeds. María Sabina was one of the best known of the Mazatec Shamans. Julieta Casimiro, a Mazatec Healer, has gained international recognition as a member of the International Council of 13 Indigenous Grandmothers – a group of spiritual elders, medicine women and wisdom keepers since its founding in 2004.

==== Chocho ====
The Chocho people live in the Oaxaca communities of Santa María Nativitas, San Juan Bautista Coixtlahuaca and San Miguel Tulancingo in the Coixtlahuaca district of the Mixteca Region. Starting from around 1900, improved education in Spanish resulted in reduction of the number of Chocho speakers, who are now mostly elderly. As of 1998, the Chocho language had 770 speakers.

The terrain of the Chocho country is mountainous with low rainfall, hot summers and cold winters. Traditional houses have wood frames with walls made from the stem of the maguey plant, and roofs of palm or maguey leaves. The main source of cash comes from weaving palm-leaf hats, which is done in caves to prevent the leaves from drying out. The staple Chocho diet is maize supplemented with beans, chiles and fruits. They may eat goat meat on Sundays, and chicken or turkey during festivals. Coixtlahuaca was a thriving Chocho and Ixtatec market until about 1900, but since then many people have had move away due to loss of topsoil to erosion.

==== Ixcatec ====
Ixcatec, also known as Xwja, is a language spoken by the people of the village of Santa María Ixcatlan in the north of the Cañada region of Oaxaca. The name Ixtepec means "people of cotton" in Nahuatl. The number of speakers was given to be 119 in the early 1980s, but according to the Consejo Nacional para la Cultura y las Artes, there were only 8 speakers of the language in 2008. The last speakers of the language are persons aged 70 years who can barely speak Spanish and cannot read or write, handicapping efforts to document and preserve the language.

==== Popoloco ====
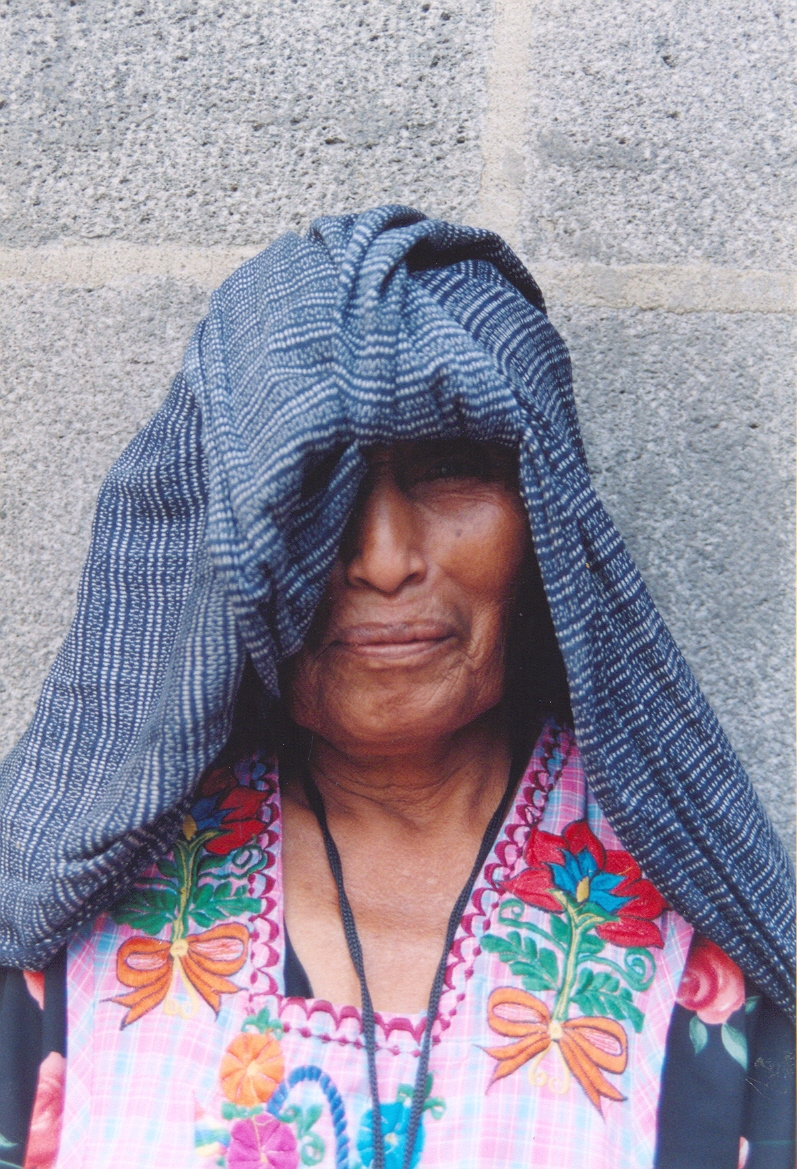
Popoloca woman

The name "Popoloco" is a Náhuatl word meaning "incomprehensible", and is applied to several unrelated people. The Popoluca of Oaxaca call themselves Homshuk, which means "God of Corn". In the 2000 census, only 61 Popoloco speakers were counted in Oaxaca. The language is related to Mazatec and Chochotec.

=== Amuzgo-Mixtecan group ===
==== Mixtec ====
The Mixtec inhabit Oaxaca, Guerrero and Puebla in a region known as La Mixteca. The Mixtecan languages form an important branch of the Otomanguean language family. The term Mixtec (Mixteco in Spanish) comes from the Nahuatl word Mixtecapan, or "place of the cloud-people."

==== Amuzgo ====
The Amuzgo language is spoken in the Costa Chica region of Guerrero and Oaxaca by about 44,000 speakers. The name Amuzgo is claimed to be a Nahuatl exonym but its meaning is shrouded in controversy; multiple proposals have been made, including [amoʃ-ko] 'moss-in'. A significant percentage of the Amuzgo speakers are monolingual; the remainder also speak Spanish.

Four variants of Amuzgo are officially recognized by the governmental agency, the Instituto Nacional de Lenguas Indígenas (INALI).

==== Cuicatec ====
The Cuicatec are closely related to the Mixtecs. They inhabit two towns: Teutila and Tepeuxila in western Oaxaca. According to the 2000 census, they number around 23,000, of whom an estimated 65% are speakers of the language.

==== Triqui ====
The Trique are an Indigenous people of the western part of Oaxaca, centered in the municipalities of Juxtlahuaca, Tlaxiaco and Putla. They number around 23,000 according to the Ethnologue surveys. All Triqui peoples are known for their distinctive woven huipiles, baskets, and morrales (handbags).

Triqui people live in a mountainous region, called "La mixteca baja", in the Southwest part of Oaxaca. The elevation within the Triqui region varies between 1,500–3,000 meters (4,900–9,800 ft). This high elevation permits low-lying cumulus clouds to envelop entire towns during the afternoons and evenings.

Like many other southern Mexicans, many Triqui men travel to Oaxaca City, Mexico City, or the United States as day laborers or migrant workers. As the average daily salary of a rural Oaxacan is less than $5 (U.S.) and La Mixteca is the poorest region of Oaxaca, migration and remittances sent back to Oaxaca confer economic benefits to both migrant Triquis and their families in Oaxaca. Triqui women are more likely to remain in the Triqui region and do not travel as often as Triqui men do.

==== Tacuate ====
As of 1992, there were about 6,000 speakers of Tacuate, a Mixtec language, of whom less than 20% were monolingual. Most of the people are engaged in subsistence agriculture, with some keeping cattle and goats, and with women producing textile crafts for a source of cash. Land tenure is usually communal. The Tacuate live in two municipalities in the Mixteca de la Costa area: Santa María Zacatepec in the Putla district and Santiago Ixtayutla in the Jamiltepec district.

=== Chinantec ===
The Chinantecs live in the Chinantla region of Oaxaca, in the districts of Choapam, Cuicatlán, Ixtlán, Tuxtepec, and Villa Alta. Their languages belong to the Western Oto-Mangue group. The Ethnologue lists 14 different Chinantecan languages.

== Mixe–Zoque family ==
People who speak languages of the Mixe–Zoque family in Oaxaca are the Mixe and the Zoque. It has been speculated that they may be descendants of the Olmec people, who created the first Mesoamerican civilization around 1500 to 400 BC.

=== Mixe ===
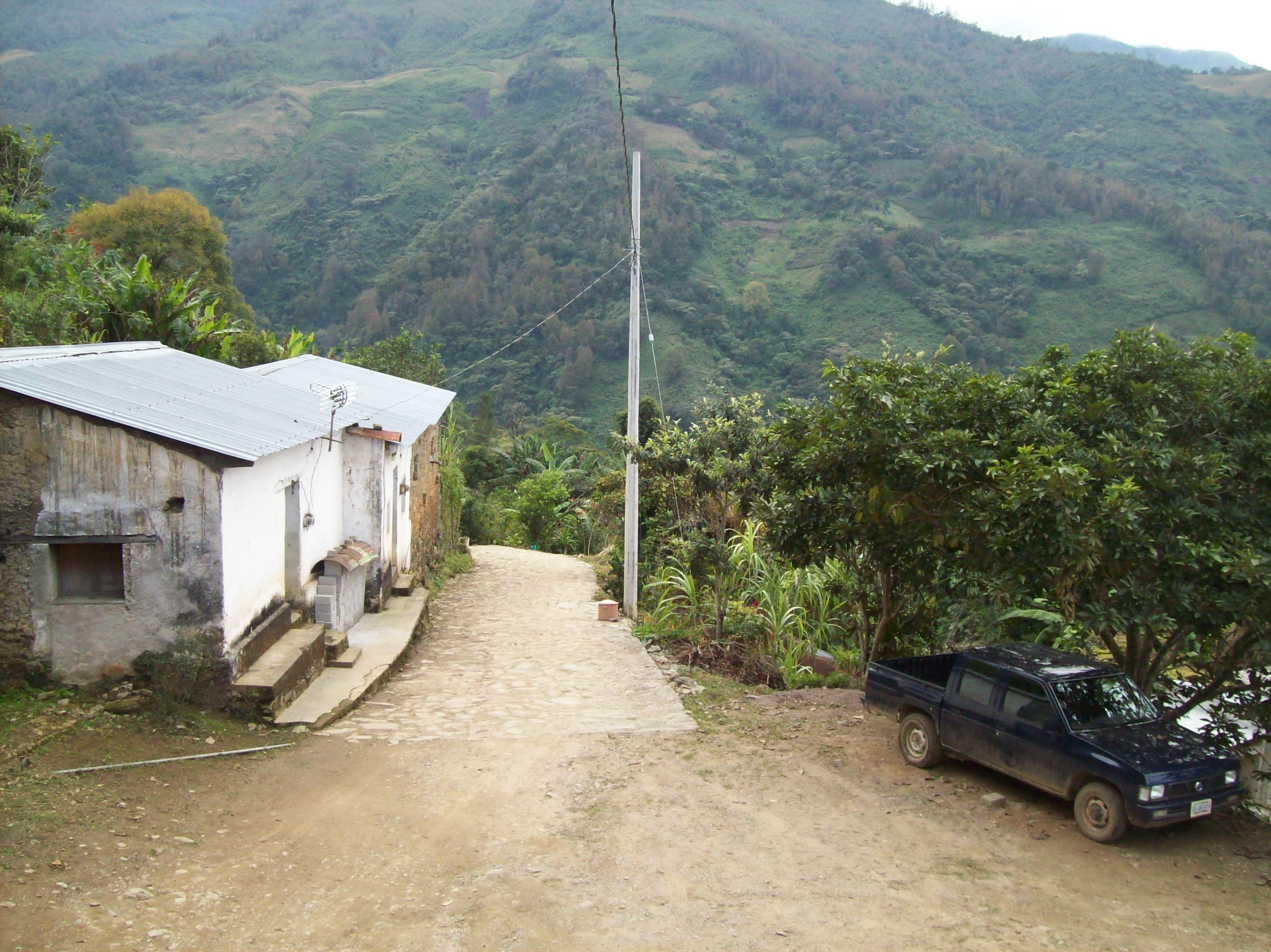
San José Chinantequilla in the Mixe region

The Mixe inhabit the eastern highlands of Oaxaca. They speak the Mixe languages, and are more culturally conservative than other Indigenous groups of the region, maintaining their language to this day. A population figure of 90,000 speakers of Mixe were estimated by SIL international in 1993. The Mixe name for themselves is ayüükj'ä'äy meaning "people who speak the mountain language". The word "Mixe" itself is probably derived from the Nahuatl word for cloud: mixtli.

=== Zoque ===
The Zoque of Oaxaca live primarily in the municipalities of Santa María Chimalapa and San Miguel Chimalapa in the Selva Zoque (Zoque forest), an area of 594,000 hectares of diverse and ecologically important forests in the Istmo de Tehuantepec region. Due to immigration of other groups, they now account for perhaps 34% of the population in this area. As of the year 2000, about 1,757 Zoque speakers lived in Santa María and 1,675 in San Miguel Chimalapa.

In the pre-Hispanic period, the Zoque lived throughout Chiapas, and as far away as the Isthmus of Tehuantepec and parts of the state of Tabasco. In 1494 they were invaded and defeated by the Aztecs, during the reign of Ahuizotl, and forced to pay tribute. The Spanish conquest of the Zoque lands commenced in 1523, under the leadership of Luis Marin. The Zoque were parceled out amongst the settlers, where they endured forced labor and were obliged to pay high tribute. Diseases, exploitation and the miserable conditions under which they lived contributed to a significant decrease in their numbers.

== Other languages ==
=== Chontal ===
Oaxacan Chontal, also called Tequistlatecan, consists of two related but mutually unintelligible languages, Huamelultec (Lowland Oaxaca Chontal), and Highland Oaxaca Chontal. There has been speculation that the languages may be part of the Hokan family of California, or perhaps the Jicaque family of Honduras. The name "Chontal" comes from the Nahuatl, meaning "foreigner" or "foreign", and is also applied to an unrelated language of Tabasco. The Chontal may have lived in the Villa Alta region to the east up to around 300 AD, but moved westward under pressure from the Mixes and moved to their present location in the 15th century due to Zapotec aggression.

Lowland Chontal is mostly spoken around San Pedro Huamelula and Santiago Astata in the Pacific coastal area of the western Tehuantepec District, which is in the west of the Istmo region. There may be about 200 fluent first-language speakers and another 750 semi-speakers, all older than 40. Lowland Chontal is considered an endangered language. The coastal lowlands cover about 870 km² made up of rugged foothills and mountain ridges 50–700 m above sea level. The climate is tropically hot and sub-humid with a dry season from October to May and a rainy season from June to September Some trees are suitable for lumber, but the region is becoming deforested. Mostly the people use slash-and-burn agriculture to cultivate maize.

As of 1990, about 3,600 spoke highland or Sierra Chontal. The speakers of this language live in the districts of Yautepec and Tehuantepec in the municipalities of San Carlos Yautepec, Santa María Ecatepec, Asunción Tlacolulita, San Miguel Tenango and Magdalena Tequisistlán. They practice subsistence agriculture growing corn, squash, beans and vegetables as well as fruit trees such soursop, mamey, sapodilla, avocado, guava and nanche. They also grow maguey mezcal, sugar, pepper and coffee. Livestock includes chickens, turkeys, pigs, goats and cattle. Hunting and fishing provide alternative food sources.

=== Huave ===
The Huave people live on a peninsula reserved for them called the Zona Huave between the Gulf of Tehuantepec and the Pacific Ocean in the Istmo de Tehuantepec region. Terrain includes low forested hills, pastures and swamps. The towns are San Mateo de Mar, San Dionisio del Mar, San Francisco del Mar and Santa Maria del Mar. There are approximately 10,000 Huave speakers, most of whom fish or practice traditional agriculture. Recently a handicrafts union has been attempting to introduce traditional weavings as a commercial product. The Huave language is a language isolate, unrelated to any other. The most vibrant speech community is in San Mateo del Mar, whose people call themselves Ikoots, meaning "us" and refer to their language as ombeayiiüts, meaning "our language".

=== Nahuatl ===
A dialect of Nahuatl referred to as Tehuacan–Zongolica Nahuatl is spoken by around 13 thousand people in a few places in the far north of Oaxaca, near Huautla de Jiménez.

=== Pochutec ===
Pochutec is an extinct language once spoken in Pochutla and surrounding areas, related to Nahuatl. It went extinct sometime in the 20th century.

== See also ==
- Indigenous peoples in Mexico
