= Tolatecan languages =

Proposed language family

Tolatecan
- (abandoned)
- Geographic distribution: Mesoamerica
- Linguistic classification: Proposed language family
- Subdivisions: Tequistlatecan (Chontal); Tolan

Language codes
- Glottolog: None
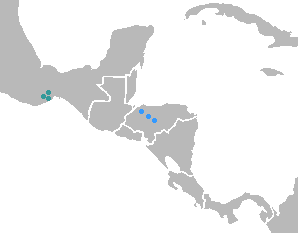

Tolatecan is a proposal by Campbell and Oltrogge (1980) linking two language families of Mesoamerica, Tequistlatecan (Chontal of Oaxaca) and Tol/Jicaque languages of Honduras. Later, Campbell (1997) said that Tolatecan is not likely to be a valid language family.

Both Tequistlatecan and Tol have been at times also included in the larger Hokan proposal, but without any special relationship within it.

== Vocabulary ==
Below is a comparison of selected basic vocabulary items in Proto-Jicaque and the Tequistlatecan languages.

gloss	Proto-Jicaque	Huamelultec	Highland Chontal	Tequistlatec
head	*ha(y)pʰuk	hwaj	ƚiWak	fa
hair	*¢ʼil	hwak’	ƚaWak	fah
eye		a’u	ƚiʔi	’uh
ear	*pʰa¢ʼ	as’mas	lišʔmas	
nose	*mik	’nał	ƚiʔnat	’nali
tooth	*wis	a’ay’	lihaʔ	ai’
tongue	*pelam	pał	ƚipaƚ	pala
mouth	*mɨy-pʰini(h); *lala	ak’o	likó	ko
hand	*mas ?	mane’	ƚimane	
foot	*tek 'leg'	a’miš	liʔmi¢	
breast		tyuwe	latuwe	pare
meat	*pis	išik’	lišik’	ci’
blood	*kʼas	hwac’	ƚaWa¢’	fas
bone	*kʰele	ekał	lekaƚ	
person	*yom	akwe’	kal šans	
name		puftyiñe	ƚaftine	
dog	*¢ʰiyo(h)	milya’	kal ¢iki	tsigi
fish	*kʰul	atyu’	ƚatu	tu’u
louse	*tɨtʼ	aykwix	ƚaykwi	
tree	*yo(h)	’ex	al ʔek	
leaf		ipela	lipela	pela
flower		ipa’	lipaʔ	pipi
water	*sɨ(tʰ)	axa’	lahaʔ	xa
fire	*kʼawa	unkwa’	ƚuŋa	ngwa
stone	*pe(h)	apix	ƚapik	pih
earth	*(a)ma(h)	amac’	ƚama¢’	
salt	*¢olim	u’we	ƚoʔwe	weh
road		ane’	lane	ne
eat	*la ?	sago’ma	lihaʔ 'food'	te, tes
die	*pɨʔ ?	ma’ma	timá	ma
I	*nap ?	iya’	iyaʔ	ya
you	*hip	ima’	imaʔ	ma
