= San Mateo del Mar =

- Municipality and town
- Location in Mexico
- Coordinates: 16°12′N 94°59′W
- Country: Mexico
- State: Oaxaca

Area
  - Total: 75.2 km^{2} (29.0 sq mi)

Population (2005)
  - Total: 12,667
- Time zone: UTC-6 (Central Standard Time)

San Mateo del Mar is a coastal town and municipality in Oaxaca in south-western Mexico. It is part of the Tehuantepec District in the west of the Istmo Region. It is the largest of four Huave towns in the region, the others being San Dionisio del Mar, San Francisco del Mar and Santa María del Mar.

As of 2005, the municipality had a total population of 12,667.

== Geography ==
The total area of the municipality is 75.2 km^{2}. It is located on the shores of the Pacific Ocean.

=== Climate ===
San Mateo del Mar has a warm climate, with rainfall in summer and early autumn.

=== Flora and fauna ===
Flora include Pochote, Mesquite and Tepehuaje. Fauna include wild boar, coyote, badger, rabbit, armadillo, chachalaca and buzzard.

== History ==
San Mateo del Mar was founded in 1606.

On 21–22 July 2020, thirteen men and two women were tortured and burned alive in a political-electoral dispute. Bishops of the Roman Catholic Diocese of Tehuantepec have called for peace and reconciliation.

== Demography ==
The population of San Mateo del Mar, according to the 2005 Census, is 12,667. There are 2,352 dwellings.

=== Language ===
Almost all of the town's population speak a dialect of the Ikoot language. According to a 1990 census, 1,800 of these Ikoot speakers are monolingual.

=== Religion ===
The predominant religion in San Mateo del Mar is Christianity, including both Catholic and evangelical adherents.

The first church building in San Mateo del Mar was constructed under the supervision of Spanish priests between 1591 and 1620. According to local legend, four men were buried alive at each corner of the church's foundation as it was built.

== Local facilities ==
=== Utilities ===
Ninety percent of the town has immediate access to drinking water.

=== Education ===
The municipality has 3 kindergartens, 2 primary schools and 1 high school.

=== Health care ===
There are four medical centres in San Mateo del Mar. The health center that was built by former governor Ulises Ruiz Ortiz (PRI) in 2009 was never equipped or staffed and this neglect was cited as one of the root causes of the July 2020 dispute that led to the massacre of 15 Ikoots.

=== Sport and recreation ===
The town has basketball, baseball and volleyball facilities.

=== Places of interest ===
San Mateo del Mar has a museum with exhibitions about Ikoot culture, located at 'La Casa del Pueblo' (People's House).

== Economy ==
The main economic activities of San Mateo are commercial fishing and agriculture. Shrimp is the most common seafood export, and bass and bream are also commercially fished. In terms of agriculture, residents grow crops such as corn and vegetables, and breed cattle, pigs and goats.

In addition, some of the townspeople make crafts. Traditional crafts include basket-making, pottery and earthenware.

== See also ==
- Huave language
