= Huave =

Huave may refer to:

- Huave people, an ethnic group of Mexico
- Huave language, their language

== See also ==
- Hoava, a language of the Solomon Islands
- Huabei
- Huawei
