= Huamelula =

Huamelula may refer to:

- San Pedro Huamelula, Oaxaca, Mexico
- Huamelula language
