= Santa María Mixtequilla =

- Municipality and town
- Location in Mexico
- Coordinates: 16°22′N 95°15′W
- Country: Mexico
- State: Oaxaca

Population (2020)
  - Total: 4,690
- Time zone: UTC-6 (Central Standard Time)

Santa María Mixtequilla is a town and municipality in Oaxaca in south-western Mexico. The municipality covers an area of km^{2}. It is part of the Tehuantepec District in the west of the Istmo Region.

As of 2010, the municipality had a total population of 3,638.
