= Santa María Jalapa del Marqués =

- Municipality and town
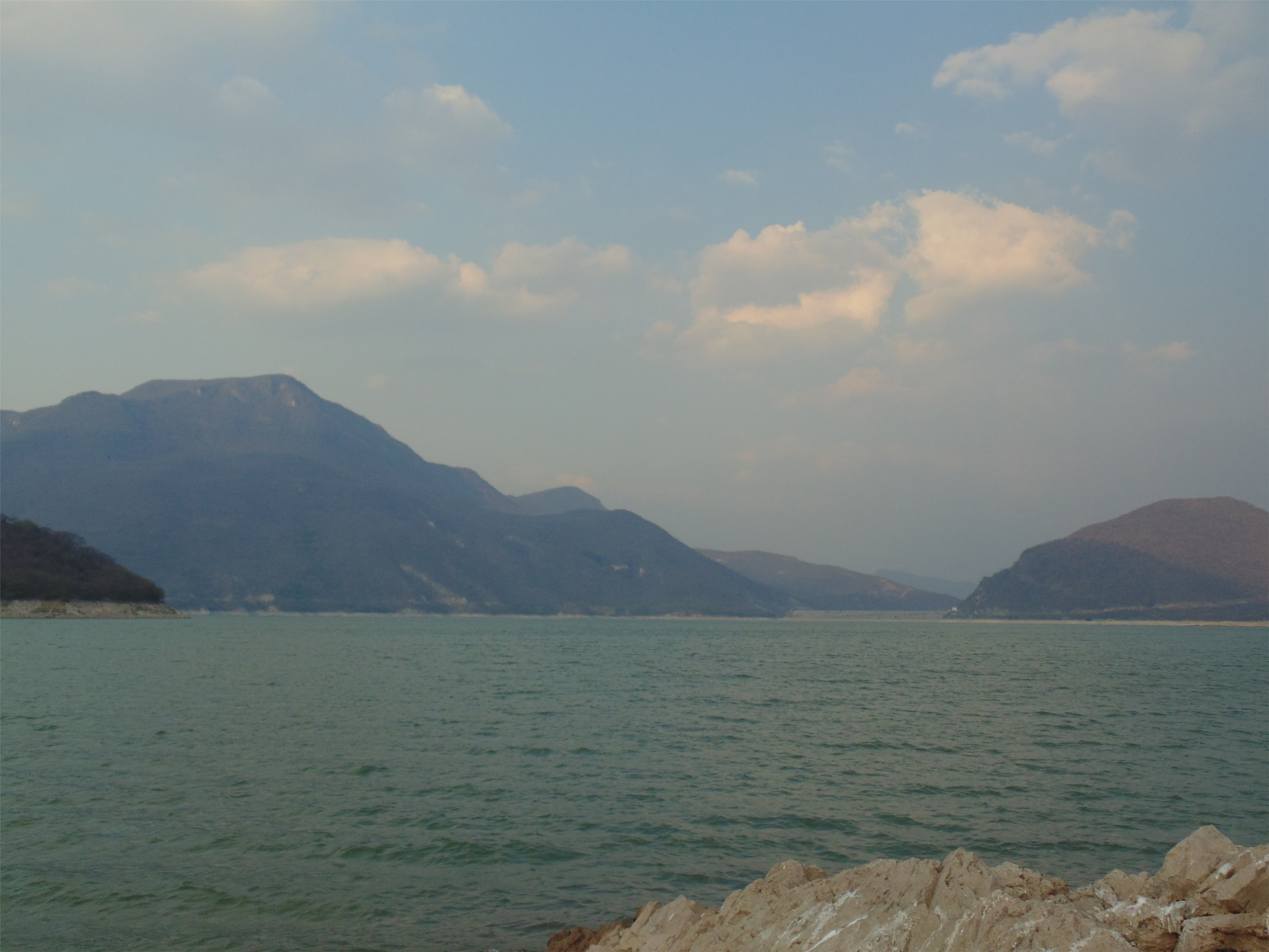
- View from the shore of Lake Benito Juárez

- Location of the municipality in Oaxaca

- Location in Mexico
- Coordinates: 16.441°N 95.444°W
- Country: Mexico
- State: Oaxaca
- Region: Istmo
- District: Tehuantepec District

Population (2020)
  - Total: 11,735
- Time zone: UTC-6 (Central Standard Time)

Santa María Jalapa del Marqués is a small city and a municipiality in the Mexican state of Oaxaca. They are both part of the Tehuantepec District in the west of the Istmo Region.

== The city ==
Jalapa del Marqués stands on Federal Highway 190, on the southern shore of the Presa Juárez reservoir. The city serves as the municipal seat and administrative centre for the surrounding municipality of the same name.

== The municipality ==
In 2020, the population was 11,735 (48.2% men and 51.8% women). Santa María Jalapa del Marqués municipality governs the following communities:

- Arroyo las Truchas
- Benito Juárez Chica
- Campamento de la Victoria (Quinta la Iguana)
- Cerro del Chivo, Cerro del Marqués
- Colonia Presidente Juárez
- El Arenal
- El Reparo
- El Tamarindo
- Granja del Ángel
- Guadalupe Victoria
- Guichiquero
- Llano Grande
- Llano Vería
- Loma Bonita
- Magdalena Guelavence
- Peña San Juan
- Pochotillo
- San Cristóbal
- Santa Elena de la Cruz
- Solo Dios
- Vishiñadu (El Palenque)
