= San Blas Atempa =

- Municipality and town
- Location in Mexico
- Coordinates: 16°19′N 95°13′W
- Country: Mexico
- State: Oaxaca

Area
  - Total: 148 km^{2} (57 sq mi)

Population (2005)
  - Total: 16,899
- Time zone: UTC-6 (Central Standard Time)

San Blas Atempa is a town and municipality in Oaxaca in south-western Mexico. The municipality covers an area of 148 square kilometres (57 sq mi).

It is part of the Tehuantepec District in the west of the Istmo Region.

As of 2005, the municipality had a total population of 16,899.
