= Huave language =

Language of Oaxaca, Mexico

Huave
- Ombeayiiüts, Umbeyajts
- Native to: Mexico
- Region: Oaxaca
- Ethnicity: Huave people
- Native speakers: 20,000 (2020 census)
- Language family: Language isolate
- Dialects: Eastern (San Dionisio and San Francisco del Mar); Western (San Mateo and Santa Maria del Mar)

Language codes
- ISO 639-3: Variously: hue – San Francisco del Mar huv – San Mateo del Mar hve – San Dionisio del Mar hvv – Santa María del Mar, Oaxaca
- Glottolog: huav1256
- ELP: Huave

Huave (also spelled Wabe) is a language isolate spoken by the indigenous Huave people on the Pacific coast of the Mexican state of Oaxaca. The language is spoken in four villages on the Isthmus of Tehuantepec, in the southeast of the state, by around 20,000 people (see table below).

Constenla Umaña (1994) suggests that Huave may have been the language of the Tacacho, a group that lived in a town called Yacacoyaua located in Maribio territory in sixteenth-century Nicaragua.

== Name ==
The Huave people of San Mateo del Mar, who call themselves Ikoots, meaning "us", refer to their language as ombeayiiüts, meaning "our language". In San Francisco del Mar, the corresponding terms are Kunajts ("us") and umbeyajts ("our language"). The term "Huave" is thought to come from the Zapotec languages, meaning "people who rot in the humidity", according to the 17th-century Spanish historian Burgoa. However, Martínez Gracida (1888) claims the meaning of the term means 'many people' in Isthmus Zapotec, interpreting hua as "abundant" and be as a shortened form of binni ("people"). The etymology of the term requires further investigation. Neither of the above etymologies is judged plausible by Isthmus Zapotec speakers.

== Classification ==
Although genetic relationships between the Huave language and several language families have been proposed, none has been substantiated, and Huave continues to be considered an isolate (Campbell 1997 pg. 161). Paul Radin proposed a relationship between Huave and the Mayan and Mixe–Zoquean languages, and Morris Swadesh proposed a connection to the Oto-Manguean languages that has been further investigated by Rensch (1976), but all proposals have been inconclusive.

An automated computational analysis (ASJP 4) by Müller et al. (2013) found lexical similarities among Huave, Totozoquean, and Chitimacha. However, since the analysis was automatically generated, the similarities could be either due to mutual lexical borrowing or genetic inheritance.

== Current use and status ==
While Huave is still in use in most domains of social life in at least one of the four villages where it is spoken, it is an endangered language. Recently, fieldwork and revitalization projects have been carried out in the Huave communities by universities of different countries.

As of 2011, it is reported that teenagers have taken to texting in Huave, so as to be able to communicate without their parents' knowing what they are saying. (The Mexican Kickapoos’ whistled speech was developed around 1915 for much the same reason.) Also as of 2011, a radio station in San Mateo del Mar, Radio Ikoots, was broadcasting in Huave.

== Dialects ==
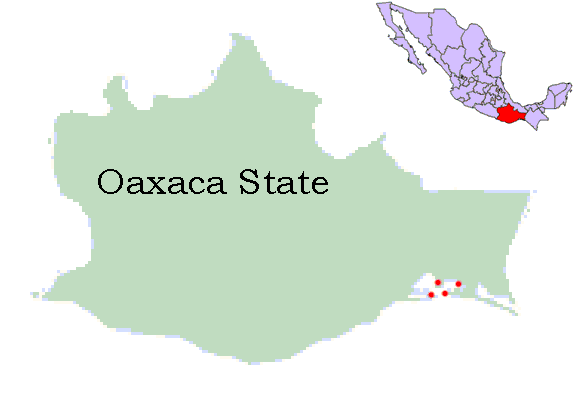
Location of the four Huave-speaking towns within the state of Oaxaca

Huave is spoken in the four coastal towns of San Francisco del Mar, San Dionisio del Mar, San Mateo del Mar and Santa Catarina del Mar. The most vibrant speech community is in San Mateo del Mar which was fairly isolated until recently. Negative speakers' attitudes towards their language and a strong social pressure from the dominant Spanish language are the main reasons for the endangerment of Huave.

Dialect and place	Number of Speakers (ca.)	ISO 639-3 (SIL)
San Dionisio del Mar	5,000	hve
San Francisco del Mar	900	hue
San Mateo del Mar	12,000	huv
Santa María del Mar	500	hvv

Although considered separate languages by SIL according to the needs of literacy materials, Campbell (1997) considers them dialects of a single language. INALI distinguishes two varieties, Eastern (Dionisio and Francisco) and Western (Mateo and Maria).

== Phonology ==
Huave of San Mateo del Mar is partly tonal, distinguishing between high and low tone in penultimate syllables only. Huave is one of only two Mesoamerican languages not to have a phonemic glottal stop (the other is Purépecha).

The phonemic inventory, reconstructed for the common ancestor of the four existing Huave varieties as presented in Campbell 1997, is as follows:

- Consonants: /p, t, ts, k, kʷ, ᵐb, ⁿd, ᵑɡ, ɡʷ, s, l, r, w, h/ (and /ɾ, j, ð/ as marginal phonemes)
- Vowels: /i, e, a, ɨ, o, u/ (and, depending on the variety, vowel length, low and high tone, aspiration).

The following phonemes are from San Francisco del Mar Huave. The San Dionisio del Mar dialect has an additional vowel phoneme, /y/, cognate with /e/ in San Mateo.

- Vowels: /i, e, u, o, ɑ/. All vowels have aspirated forms.

Consonants
		Bilabial	Alveolar	Palatal	Velar		Glottal
		Bilabial	Alveolar	Palatal	plain	labialized	Glottal
Stop	voiceless	p	t		k	kʷ	
Stop	prenasalized	ᵐb	ⁿd		ᵑɡ	ᵑɡʷ	
Affricate	voiceless		t͡s				
Affricate	prenasalized		ⁿt͡s				
Fricative		ɸ	s				h
Nasal		m	n				
Approximant		w	l	j			
Trill			r				
Flap			ɾ				

== Grammar ==
Huave is similar to the Mayan languages in being both morphologically and syntactically ergative and consistently head-marking. It is less morphologically complex than Mayan languages, however, and usually each word has only a few affixes. There are obligatory categories on the verb of absolutive person and present, past or future tense, plus additional categories of transitive subject, indefinite subject and reflexive.

Complex sentences in Huave often juxtapose multiple verbs each inflected for the appropriate person. An interesting feature of Huave is that verbs meaning "give" can be used to produce causative meaning, whilst a verb meaning "come" is used to produce purpose clauses (i.e. meaning "in order to" in English). There are other purpose clauses introduced by more ordinary particles in which the verb is inflected for a special subordinate mode.

Word order, like verb morphology, in Huave follows a fully ergative pattern. The basic word order can be expressed very simply as Ergative Verb Absolutive. This means that whilst in transitive clauses the word order is AVO, in intransitive clauses the word order is verb–subject (VS). Adjectives and demonstratives can be placed either before or after the noun to which they refer, whilst numerals obligatorily precede their nouns.

Reduplication is a very productive phonological process in Huave. The verb root is reduplicated and the newly formed word's meaning is an intensified or repeated version of the meaning of the base verb. Huave also contains some partial reduplication, where only part of the root is reduplicated (typically its final VC sequence). Unlike full reduplication, this process is not productive.

== Sample text ==
Practical orthographies are currently in use by literate speakers in San Mateo, San Francisco, San Dionisio and Santa María del Mar. There is an effort going on by the Mexican INALI (National Institute for Indigenous Languages) to standardize the orthography together with speakers from all four communities.

The following text-sample is a passage from Cuentos Huaves III published by the Instituto Lingüístico de Verano:

Tambüw chüc ambiyaw chüc xicuüw,
'Two compadres went to kill deer'

ambiyaw chüc coy, nggwaj. Apiüng chüc nop:
'and they went to kill rabbits. One (of them) said:'

—Tabar combül, ambiyar coya, ambiyar xicuüwa, ambiyar püecha —aw chüc.
'Let's go, compadre, to kill rabbits, deer and chachalacas'.

—Nggo namb —aw chüc.
'I won't go', he said'.
