= Santo Domingo Chihuitán =

Coordinates: 16°35′N 95°10′W

- Municipality and town
- Interactive map of Santo Domingo Chihuitán
- Country: Mexico
- State: Oaxaca
- Time zone: UTC-6 (Central Standard Time)

Santo Domingo Chihuitán is a town and municipality in Oaxaca in south-western Mexico. The municipality covers an area of km^{2}. It is part of the Tehuantepec District in the west of the Istmo Region.

As of 2005, the municipality had a total population of .
