= San Pedro Comitancillo =

- Municipality
- Location in Mexico
- Coordinates: 16°29′N 95°9′W
- Country: Mexico
- State: Oaxaca
- District: Tehuantepec District

Area
  - Total: 165.86 km^{2} (64.04 sq mi)
- Elevation: 70 m (230 ft)
- Time zone: UTC-6 (Central Standard Time)

San Pedro Comitancillo is a town and municipality in Oaxaca in south-western Mexico. It is part of the Tehuantepec District in the west of the Istmo Region.

== Geography ==
The municipality covers an area of 165.86 km^{2}. The only river is the Guigu Shunii. The climate is warm, sub humid with summer rains. Flora include nopal, guayacan cuajilote, huamuchil, fig, acacia, huaje, oak, mahogany, mango, coconut and lemon. Wild fauna include coyote, opossum, raccoon, hare, chachalaca, dove, quail, armadillo, iguana and rabbit.

== Economy ==
As of 2005, the municipality had 1,018 households with a total population of 3,858, of whom 1,941 spoke the Zapotec language. The main economic activities include agriculture, growing corn, beans, sesame and peanuts, and breeding of cattle, pigs and goats. Hunting and fishing is practiced for local consumption. The forests are logged for fine wood to be used in furniture making, and for fuel and construction.

There are some local businesses in San Pedro Comitancillo Oaxaca. One is the local free market where people from the town goes to sell their local products, such as corn, cheese, milk or some traditional dishes. The second is an old drugstore "Farmacia San Pedro" which has 27 years old of history in this town, and is the most complete store. There are two more drugstores and some other kind of locals. There are several puestos de comida which sell tlayudas.
