= San Miguel Tenango =

- Municipality and town
- Location in Mexico
- Coordinates: 16°16′N 95°36′W
- Country: Mexico
- State: Oaxaca

Area
  - Total: 326.61 km^{2} (126.10 sq mi)

Population (2005)
  - Total: 684
- Time zone: UTC-6 (Central Standard Time)

San Miguel Tenango is a town and municipality in Oaxaca in southeastern Mexico and is the fourth least densely populated municipality than Oaxaca, but is not as sparsely populated as Santa Magdalena Jicotlán, Santa María Ixcatlán, or Santa María Chimalapa. It is part of the Tehuantepec District in the west of the Istmo Region.

== Geography ==
The municipality covers an area of 326.61 km^{2} at an altitude of 1,550 meters above sea level in the Sierra Madre del Sur mountains. The climate is cool, with abundant rains in summer and autumn. Flora includes pine, oak, Tepehuaje, copal, kapok tree, bean pod, locust, Guanacaste, fruit trees and herbaceous plants. Wild fauna include coyote, wild boar, deer, raccoon, badger, armadillo, birds and reptiles.

== Population ==
As of 2005, the municipality had 172 households with a total population of 684 of whom 7 spoke an indigenous language. Some speak the highland version of Oaxacan Chontal.

== Economy ==
Economic activities include agriculture (beans, sorghum, pumpkin, sesame, vegetables and corn), animal husbandry (cattle, goats and pigs), dairy processing and manufacture of various crafts. Hunting and fishing are practiced for personal consumption.
