= San Pedro Huamelula =

Huamelula
- Municipality and town
- Location in Mexico
- Coordinates: 16°1′N 95°40′W
- Country: Mexico
- State: Oaxaca

Area
  - Total: 505.23 km^{2} (195.07 sq mi)
- Elevation: 80 m (260 ft)

Population (2005)
  - Total: 8,834
- Time zone: UTC-6 (Central Standard Time)

Huamelula is a town and municipality in Oaxaca in south-western Mexico. It is in the west of the Tehuantepec District in the west of the Istmo Region, on the Pacific coast.

== Geography ==
The municipality covers an area of 505.23 km^{2} of hilly and partly wooded country. The Rosario lagoon is in the southwest of the municipality. The climate is warm, with rains in summer and autumn. Flora include nopal, huaje, palm, pine, Guanacaste, pochote, Tepehuaje, acacia, sapodilla and pitaya. Wild fauna include wild boar, coyote, rabbit, opossum, armadillo, dove, chachalaca and rook.

== History ==
An ancient settlement was found near the current village dating back to around 300 AD, which appears to have been occupied until the colonial period. Several years ago, a monumental mound was bulldozed to give way for a baseball ground. Under direction, school children collected an array of artifacts from the site, which is now the main collection of the Museo Chontal at San Pedro Huamelula. It includes hacha-style stone sculptures and large vessel fragments. San Pedro Huamelula was founded in 1499. The original name Huamimilolli means "beside the mound of amaranth".

== Population ==
The town is 80 meters above sea level. As of 2005, the municipality had 2,280 households with a total population of 8,834 of whom 546 spoke an indigenous language. The Huamelula language is spoken in the municipality. Some of the people speak the lowland version of Oaxacan Chontal, a language that is in danger of extinction.

== Economy ==
The main economic activity is agriculture, with crops of mainly coffee and tropical fruits, and to a lesser extent corn and beans. Some of keep cattle or goats. Commercial fishing includes species such as shrimp and snapper. Cottage industries make clay pots and wooden products. There is some logging for fine woods from the forests.

== Tradition ==
The town is known for a custom of marriage between the town's mayor and a female caiman that has been practiced for over 230 years. This commemorates the agreement on peace by two native communities, the Huave and the Chontal Maya. The mayor represents the Chontal king and the caiman represents the Huave princess. In July 2023, the mayor Victor Hugo Sosa thus married the caiman Alicia Adriana, whom he called "the princess girl" and professed his love for her. The caiman was dressed in a green skirt, a colourful hand-embroidered tunic and a headdress of ribbons and sequin. The pair travelled from house to house, accompanied by musicians and dancers. After the caiman was put in white bride's clothing, the ceremony continued in the town hall where the pair was officially married. The local people hope this would bring them luck and good fishing.

== See also ==
- Huamelultec vocabulary list on the Spanish Wikipedia
