= San Pedro Huilotepec =

- Municipality and town
- Location in Mexico
- Coordinates: 16°15′N 95°9′W
- Country: Mexico
- State: Oaxaca

Area
  - Total: 103.06 km^{2} (39.79 sq mi)
- Elevation: 20 m (66 ft)

Population (2005)
  - Total: 2,396
- Time zone: UTC-6 (Central Standard Time)

San Pedro Huilotepec is a town and municipality in Oaxaca in south-western Mexico. It is part of the Tehuantepec District in the west of the Istmo Region. "Huilotepec" means stone wasp.

== Geography ==
The municipality covers an area of 103.06 km^{2}, and is between the city of Salina Cruz and the Superior Lagoon. The Tehuantepec river flows past the town. The climate is warm with little variation during the year. Flora include Guanacaste, ceiba, congo, sauce, mango and coconut. Fauna include wild cat, badger, coyote, wild boar, birds and reptiles.

== Population ==
As of 2005, the municipality had 614 households. The main town is San Pedro Huilotepec, with a population of 2,396 people.

== Economy ==
Economic activity includes cultivation of corn, sesame, beans and vegetables, extensive cattle grazing, and fishing, perhaps the most important activity. The Union of Indigenous Communities of the Isthmus Region, a cooperative founded in 1982, assists in production and distribution of the local products under a fair trade label.
