= Santiago Lachiguiri =

- Municipality and town
- Location in Mexico
- Coordinates: 16°41′N 95°32′W
- Country: Mexico
- State: Oaxaca
- District: Tehuantepec District

Area
  - Total: 673.63 km^{2} (260.09 sq mi)
- Elevation: 800 m (2,600 ft)
- Time zone: UTC-6 (Central Standard Time)

Santiago Lachiguiri is a town and municipality in Oaxaca in south-western Mexico. It is part of the Tehuantepec District in the west of the Istmo Region.

== Geography ==
The municipality covers an area of 673.63 km^{2} (260.09 sq mi). The Cerro de las Flores is the highest mountain in the Isthmo region at 2,200 meters (7,200 ft) above sea level. The climate in the lower south side of the mountains is hot, with a constant wind from north to south.

=== Flora and fauna ===
Flora include pine, oak, mango, avocado, sapodilla, tamarind, plum, granaditas, peach and banana. Wild fauna include tapir, badgers, cat, raccoon, armadillo, rabbit, boar, porcupines, coyotes, parrots and various reptiles.

== Demography ==
As of 2005, the municipality had 1,110 households with a total population of 4,361 of which 2,339 people spoke an indigenous language.

== Economy ==
The villagers grow coffee, maize, beans and chiles, raise cattle and log the cedar, pine and oak trees. They practice hunting and fishing for private consumption. The Union of Indigenous Communities of the Isthmus Region, a cooperative founded in 1982, assists in production and distribution of the local products, notably coffee, under fair trade or organic labels.

There are copper, iron, gold and quartz mines in the vicinity. Arco Resources of Canada owns two mining claims near the town, El Pochotle and El Pochotle II, which it is investigating for precious metals. Continuum Resources, another Canadian company, also has 3000 hectares of mining concessions near Santiago Lachiguiri. These include older mines that in the past were used to access silver-rich zones of lead-zinc sulphides and oxides.
