= Santiago Astata =

Santiago Astata Municipality
- Municipality
- Location in Mexico
- Coordinates: 15°59′N 95°40′W
- Country: Mexico
- State: Oaxaca

Area
  - Total: 446.54 km^{2} (172.41 sq mi)
- Elevation: 30 m (98 ft)
- Time zone: UTC-6 (Central Standard Time)

Santiago Astata is a town and municipality in Oaxaca in south-western Mexico. It is part of the Tehuantepec District in the west of the Istmo Region. The name "Astata" means "place of herons".

== Geography ==
The municipality covers an area of 446.54 km^{2} at an elevation of 30 metres above sea level. The climate is very warm. Flora includes deciduous trees and shrubs such as passion fruit, cachimbo and mesquite. Wild fauna consist of deer, rabbit, badger and wild boar.

=== Climate ===
Climate data for Santiago Astata (1991–2020 normals, extremes 1979–present)
Month	Jan	Feb	Mar	Apr	May	Jun	Jul	Aug	Sep	Oct	Nov	Dec	Year
Record high °C (°F)	40.5 (104.9)	39.5 (103.1)	40.5 (104.9)	42 (108)	42 (108)	40 (104)	41 (106)	41.5 (106.7)	41 (106)	40 (104)	39.5 (103.1)	39.5 (103.1)	42 (108)
Mean daily maximum °C (°F)	33.7 (92.7)	34.4 (93.9)	34.9 (94.8)	35.3 (95.5)	35.3 (95.5)	33.4 (92.1)	33.9 (93.0)	33.7 (92.7)	32.7 (90.9)	33.3 (91.9)	34.2 (93.6)	33.8 (92.8)	34.0 (93.2)
Daily mean °C (°F)	26.8 (80.2)	27.1 (80.8)	27.8 (82.0)	28.5 (83.3)	29.0 (84.2)	27.8 (82.0)	27.9 (82.2)	27.8 (82.0)	27.1 (80.8)	27.1 (80.8)	27.6 (81.7)	27.0 (80.6)	27.6 (81.7)
Mean daily minimum °C (°F)	19.9 (67.8)	19.9 (67.8)	20.8 (69.4)	21.7 (71.1)	22.7 (72.9)	22.2 (72.0)	22.0 (71.6)	22.0 (71.6)	21.5 (70.7)	21.0 (69.8)	21.0 (69.8)	20.2 (68.4)	21.2 (70.2)
Record low °C (°F)	11 (52)	13 (55)	12 (54)	15 (59)	17 (63)	15 (59)	14 (57)	15.5 (59.9)	15 (59)	14 (57)	13.5 (56.3)	11.5 (52.7)	11 (52)
Average precipitation mm (inches)	30.3 (1.19)	1.2 (0.05)	3.6 (0.14)	8.7 (0.34)	80.6 (3.17)	305.1 (12.01)	199.7 (7.86)	198.2 (7.80)	235.7 (9.28)	100.9 (3.97)	35.2 (1.39)	8.7 (0.34)	1,207.9 (47.56)
Average precipitation days	1.7	0.3	0.8	0.7	5.3	13.2	10.9	12.4	14.1	6.4	1.2	0.6	67.6
Source: Servicio Meteorológico Nacional

== Demography ==
As of 2005, the municipality had a total population of 3,642 of whom 273 spoke an indigenous language. A few people speak the lowland version of Oaxacan Chontal, a language that is in danger of extinction.

== Economy ==
Economic activities include agriculture (beans, corn, sesame, sorghum, watermelon, cantaloupe, tomatoes and peanuts), animal husbandry (cattle, goats and pigs), harvesting the ocean for fish and shellfish for the Salina Cruz market, limestone quarrying and logging.
