= Magdalena Tequisistlán =

- Municipality and town
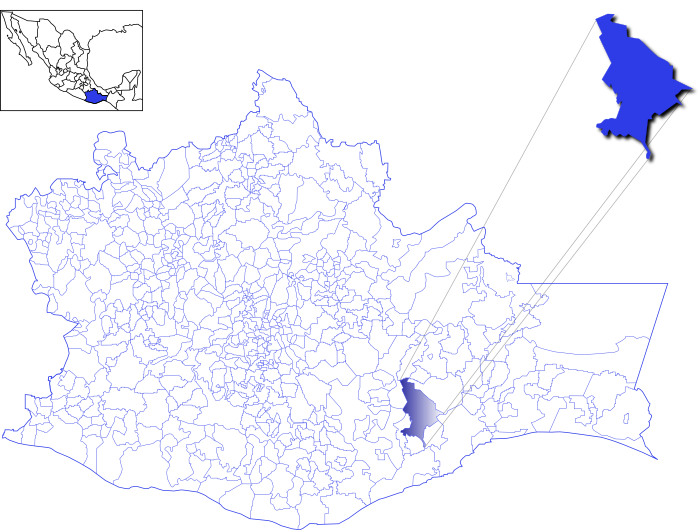
- Location of the municipality in Oaxaca

- Location in Mexico
- Coordinates: 16°24′N 95°37′W
- Country: Mexico
- State: Oaxaca

Area
  - Total: 599.64 km^{2} (231.52 sq mi)

Population (2005)
  - Total: 6,014
- Time zone: UTC-6 (Central Standard Time)

Magdalena Tequisistlán is a town and municipality in the Mexican state of Oaxaca, located 470 km (290 mi) southeast of Mexico City. It is part of the Tehuantepec District in the west of the Istmo Region. The town was founded in 1410 under the present name. In the Chontal language it was known as "Maadú".

Older spelling variations include Tequixistlán.

== History ==
The Tequistlatec language, now extinct, used to be spoken in Tequisistlán.

== Geography ==
The municipality covers an area of 599.64 km^{2} at an altitude of 190 meters above sea level. The climate is warm sub humid, with summer rains.

=== Flora and fauna ===
Flora include chepil, epazote, purslane, pine, oak, tepehuaje, pochote, and coconut. Wild fauna include deer, skunk, opossum, coyote, armadillo, and wild boar.

== Demography ==
As of 2005, the municipality had 1,524 households with a total population of 6,014 of whom 232 who spoke an indigenous language. Some speak the highland version of Oaxacan Chontal. The people grow corn, coffee and vegetables for personal consumption. About 30% of the population is engaged in raising cattle. Hunting and fishing are practiced for personal consumption. There are large deposits of marble that are exploited by local cooperatives, employing 40% of the economically active population. Mezcal is made also to a lesser extent.

== Communities ==
As municipal seat, Magdalena Tequisistlán has governing jurisdiction over the following communities:

- Ampliación Colonia Guadalupe,
- Bambita,
- Barrio de la Cruz,
- Barrio del Calvario,
- Barrio del Rosario,
- Barrio Pancilo,
- Colonia Marilú,
- El Ciprés,
- El Polvorín,
- El Sauce
- Huerta los Rosales (Barrio Centro),
- La Concepción,
- La Pájima,
- Las Majadas,
- Las Minas,
- Los Nanches,
- Pochotillo (Casa Blanca),
- Colonia San Jose,
- San Miguel Ecatepec,
- San Pedro Jilotepec.

== See also ==
- Tequistlatecan languages
