= Tequistlatec language =

Extinct Chontal language

Tequistlatec
- Native to: Mexico
- Region: Oaxaca
- Extinct: after 1930s
- Language family: Hokan ?: Tequistlatecan; Tequistlatec

Language codes
- ISO 639-3: None (mis)
- Glottolog: tequ1245

Tequistlatec is an extinct Chontal language of Tequisistlán town, Oaxaca. Highland Oaxaca Chontal is sometimes also called Tequistlatec, but it is a distinct language.

== Classification ==
Tequistlatec is related to the other Chontal languages of Oaxaca to the south of it, which are sometimes erroneously called "Tequistlatec" also. Tequistlatec proper, as described by Angulo and Freeland (1925), appears to have been closer to the lowland variety than the highland variety, even though the Tequistlatecs lived farther away from the coast than from the mountains.

Oltrogge and Campbell have proposed that the Chontal languages are related to the Jicaquean languages of Honduras and offered comparative lexical evidence to support their hypothesis.

== Phonology ==
The phonological inventory includes glottalization contrasts:

		Labial	Alveolar	Alveolar palatal.	Palatal		Velar	Glotal
		Labial	Alveolar	Alveolar palatal.	simple	affric.	Velar	Glotal
Stop		p ~ b	t (d)	tʲ	kʲ	ɡɣ	k (g)	ʔ
Fricative		f	s ~ ʃ				x	h
Nasal	simple	m	n	nʲ				
Nasal	glottal.		nʼ					
Tap			ɾ					
Approximant		w	l	lʲ	j			

Tequistlatec has six phonemic vowels: /i, e, a, ã, o, u/.

== Vocabulary ==
Tequistlatec was briefly described by Angula and Freeland (1925). Of the 200 words listed by these authors, more than half have cognates in Highland Oaxaca Chontal and Huamelultec, and in some cases the words are identical across all three languages. Of the remaining words, about 25 are cognate only with Huamelultec, and 19 are cognate only with Highland Chontal. Another eleven terms are similar in the other two varieties but different in Tequistlatec. Finally, 20 words are different among the three languages.

Word list derived from de Angulo and Freeland (1925):

gloss	Chontal of Tequixistlan	notes
fire	ngwa	
to boil	mb’ula	
to dry	hur	
water	xa	
river	pana’ m’am	
to bathe	pos	
sea	maxa	(cf. water, river)
(Perfect)	-pa, -ba	
(Continuative)	-ngu (sg.), -mi (pl.)	
(Present Future)	-ma (sg.), -me (pl.)	
(Imperative)	-ra (sg.), -re (pl.)	
(temporal suffix of obscure meaning)	-li	
(Andative)	-kiç	
(Causative)	-mu	
(Impending Future)	-ga (sg.), -ri	
big	be	
little	taç, tçofi, tyof	
one	nula, nuli	
two	kwesi	
three	fane	
four	malbu	
yes	akya, oy	
not	tçi, tçite	
dog	tsigi	
chile, pepper	kasi	
plátano, banana	owe, labe	
tomato	ngone	
corn, maize	kosa’	
bean	r’ane	
flower	pipi	
person	sans (sg.), sanu (pl.)	
man, adult	kwe (sg.), gurbe (pl.)	
woman	tee (sg.), deya (pl.)	
girl	bata	
child (either sex), daughter, son	’wa (sg.), naske (pl.)	
I	ya	
thou	ma	
he	gge	
we	yã	
ye	mã	
they	re	
it	i (sg.), n (pl.)	an indefinite demonstrative pronoun equivalent to "he", "the", "that", etc.
the	al, dal, gal, la	
stranger	gwaya	
Chontal	fale	
Zapotec	nye	
Yalalag	xoço	
Tehuantepec	uçia	
Oaxaca	pampala	
Tequixistlan	al riya	"the village"
word, language	taygi	
