= Final clause =

Dependent adverbial clause expressing purpose

A final clause in linguistics is a dependent adverbial clause expressing purpose. For this reason it is also referred to as a purposive clause or a clause of purpose.

In English, final clauses are relatively rare. A final clause is a reply to a question containing the question word wherefore or what for (sometimes also why). The prescription for their construction is rather complicated:

A final clause is introduced by the following linking words (conjunctions):

- that (sometimes preceded by in order or so, or, in literary language, to the end)
- lest (equivalent to that not, sometimes with the meaning for fear that, both of these naturally belonging to the that category)

Depending on the conjunction used, two forms of final clause exist:

- if that is used, the final clause takes may in the present and future, and might in the past, sometimes also shall because of the Latin subjunctive
  - Wherefore do you play the violin? – I play the violin that I may enjoy myself.
  - What did you hit me for? – I hit you so that they might not become suspicious of us.
  - Why did you go to the city? – I went to the city in order that I might buy some new clothes in the shopping centre.
  - I grabbed the rope that I might not fall.
- if lest is used, the final clause takes should or may (the latter being obsolescent, and used only for the present and the future), or the subjunctive.
  - I grabbed the rope lest I should fall.
  - I play the violin lest I should (or may) be bored.
  - He does what he is told lest he be sacked. (subjunctive)
  - He used the subjunctive lest they thought him uncouth. (past subjunctive, which appears the same in UK English as the past)

Final clauses that refer to the same subject as the main clause of the sentence can be expressed with to, in order to, so as to, for fear of, et cetera. This short form of the final clause is much more common than the final clause itself.

- She reads that she may be wise. = She reads to be wise.
- You cried for fear that you might not have impressed the examiners. = You cried for fear of not impressing the examiners.
- I paint in order that I may be happy. = I paint to be happy.

Karsten Schmidtke-Bode examined final clauses, in the context of purpose clauses, as intended to bring about a specific matrix clause situation in a complex sentence construction. There are recurring trends of grammatical coding across many languages. It is common for languages to have purpose clauses expressed in different strategies. Purpose clause topological mapping aims to explain the universal conceptual characteristics of morphosyntactic coding in the communicative functions, as well as the cognitive-psychological mechanisms involved in the use. Purpose clauses differ from typical adverbial relations, and are a special case which, is closely related to complement clauses and some relative clauses.

Purpose, as a simple grammatical infinitive, follows verbs that express or imply motion in English, according to Hubert Gibson Sharin.
