= Highland Oaxaca Chontal =

Chontal language of Oaxaca, Mexico

- Slijuala xanuk
- Native to: Mexico
- Region: Oaxaca
- Ethnicity: Oaxaca Chontal
- Native speakers: 4,394 (2010 census)
- Language family: Hokan ?: Tequistlatecan; Highland Oaxaca Chontal

Language codes
- ISO 639-3: chd
- Glottolog: high1242
- ELP: Highland Chontal

Highland Oaxaca Chontal, or Chontal de la Sierra de Oaxaca, is one of the Chontal languages of Oaxaca, Mexico. It is sometimes called Tequistlatec, but is not the same as Tequistlatec proper, which is extinct.

== Background ==
Highland Oaxaca Chontal (or Chontal de la Sierra de Oaxaca) is one of three Tequistlatecan languages family groups. The other two are Huamelultec (Lowland Oaxaca Chontal) and Tequistlatec (extinct). They are spoken or once spoken by the Chontal people of Oaxaca State, Mexico. Tequistlatecan language is also referred to as the Chontal of Oaxaca. The distinct breakdown in the dialect of the Chontal of Oaxaca is as follows: Highland Chontal (the mountainous terrain) and Lowland Chontal (of Pacific coast).

It was spoken by 4,400 people in 2010.

== Phonology ==
=== Consonants ===
Highland Chontal has a medium-sized inventory of 23 native consonants, along with four borrowed consonants from Spanish /β ð ɾ r/. It distinguishes ejective consonants, including the cross-linguistically unusual ejective labiodental fricative /f'/.

| | | Labial | Alveolar | | Palato- (-alveolar) | Velar | Glottal or placeless |
| | | Labial | Median | Lateral | Palato- (-alveolar) | Velar | Glottal or placeless |
|---|---|---|---|---|---|---|---|
| Stop | Plain | p | t | | | k | ʔ |
| Stop | Voiced | b | d | | | g | |
| Stop | Ejective | | | | | kʼ | |
| Affricate | Plain | | ts | | tʃ | | |
| Affricate | Ejective | | tsʼ | tɬʼ | tʃʼ | | |
| Fricative | Plain | f | | ɬ | ʃ | x~h | |
| Fricative | Ejective | fʼ | | | | | |
| Fricative | Voiced | (β) | (ð) | | | | |
| Nasal | | m | n | | | | ɴ̥ |
| Glide | | | | | j | w | |
| Tap | | | (ɾ) | | | | |
| Trill | | | (r) | | | | |

Turner (1966) transcribes the ejective lateral affricate [tɬʼ] as an ejective fricative /ɬʼ/. It is not clear whether the ejective labiodental fricative /fʼ/ might likewise be a phonetic affricate [p̪fʼ] or similar.

The placeless voiceless nasal /ɴ̥/ assimilates to the place of articulation of the consonant following it, e.g. /ɴ̥t/ > [n̥t]. Thus it has four allophones [m̥ n̥ ɲ̊ ŋ̊]. Its place of articulation before glottal consonants, vowels or pause is unclear, if it occurs in these environments at all.

Highland Chontal Glottalized Phonemes
| | Bilabial | Labiodental | Alveolar | Palato Alveolar | Velar |
|---|---|---|---|---|---|
| Ejective Stop | | | | | k' |
| Ejective Affricatives | | | ts' | tʃ' | |
| Glottalized Fricatives | | f' | | | |
| Glottalized Nasals | m' | | n' | | ŋ’ |
| Glottalized Lateral Fricatives | | | ɫ’ | | |

Highland Chontal Non-Glottalized consonant Phonemes
| | Bilabial | Labio-dental | Alveolar | Palato-Alveolar | Palatal | Velar | Glottal |
|---|---|---|---|---|---|---|---|
| Plosives | p, b | | t, d | | | k, g | ʔ |
| Affricates | | | ts | tʃ | | | |
| Fricatives | | f | s | ʃ | | | |
| Nasals | m | | n | | ɲ | ŋ | |
| Lateral fricatives | | | ɫ | | | | |
| Lateral Approximants | | | l | | | | |
| Trill | | | r | | | | |
| Central Approximants | ʍ, w | | | | | | |

=== Vowels ===
Highland Chontal has an inventory of five vowels, an arrangement similar to Spanish and many other world languages:

| | Front | Central | Back |
|---|---|---|---|
| Close | i | | u |
| Mid | e | | o |
| Open | | a | |

The distinction between /e/ and /a/ is neutralized before /j/.

There is no vowel hiatus (since all syllables begin with a consonant), nor any phonemic diphthongs.

In the Highland Chontal also has stressed vowels which are /í é á ó ú/.

== Orthography ==
In Highland Chontal, phonemes correspond to orthographic conventions which are in angled brackets <>.

| p | t, c <ts> | č <ch> | k <c, qu/_i, e> | | |
| f' | c' <ts'> | č' <ch'> | k'<c' q' u/_i, e> | ʔ <h> | t' |
| f | s.N<jn> | š <x> | W<ju> | h <j> | t |
| b | d | | g | | |
| m | n | y | ŋ w | | l |

== Syntax ==
The structure for highland Chontal is formatted but, not limited to: Verb-Subject-Object or VSO, another order is SVO. Rules for prefixes depend on the tense used,

Example: in the first-person plural for an object, if it is present in a sentence, it does not allow subject prefix. The order for certain words like adjectives and nouns can change, the examples below can be used for reference:

la-pin-jla ijle l-ipa alfujka, iya ka-pina-m-u lumshali k-ipa
1S.OBJ-give-NM.IMP DEM LIM-flower white 1S 1S.NPAST-give-FUT-2S.OBJ red LIM-flower
‘Give me the white flower and I will give you the red flower.’

=== Suffixes ===
Identifying a singular person object in a sentence is marked by a suffix, plural objects in sentences are always suffixes.

=== Morphemes ===
The morpheme in the sentence structure determines which roots are used by verb stems. Readers can identify nouns in sentences by "limiters", these are described as prefixes. Limiters can be in a sentence structures as initial words and also be present if possession prefixes are present.

The Highland Chontal of Tequistlatecan has a complex system of verbal prefix system. According to Gregory Richter, the author of "Highland Chontal Morphology: Some New Perspectives", the current morphological structure for Highland Chontal is that there are distinct verb classes and they each have a set of corresponding prefixes. Highland Chontal can be differentiated from Lowland with its tense and subject prefixes, the sets of rules for prefixes in highland is not found with lowland chontal.

| | singular | plural |
|---|---|---|
| 1st person | l-ayn-inu-ba when-1SG-run-RCT "when I ran" | l-al-inul-ba when-1PL-run-RCT "when we ran" |
| 2nd person | l-om-inu-ba when-2SG-run-RCT "when you ran" | l-ol-inul-ba when-2PL-run-RCT "when you ran" |
| 3nd person | l-inu-ba when-run-RCT "when he ran" | l-inul-ba when-run=PL-RCT "when they ran" |

Morphological Structure for Run
| | Recent indicative | Present Indicative |
|---|---|---|
| 1sg | n-inu-ba | g-inu |
| 2sg | m-inu-ba | d-a-ynu |
| 3sg | inu-ba | d-inu |
| 1pl | l-inul-ba | l-inul-yi |
| 2pl | ol-inul-ba | d-ul-inul-yi |
| 3pl | inul-ba | d-inul-yi |

Morphological structure: VERB--> (NPST-) (PREFIX-) ROOT (-SUFFIX)

The tables above show the one to one correspondence between segments of a prefix and its underlying representation.

The table shows the changes in the paradigm of /inu/ (run) when appended to the particle /l/ (when).with yes/no are used by rising the pitch of speech in speaking. Examples:

inu gal-tejua?
hot LIM-food
‘Is the food hot?’

o-tsewoh-ma al-plaza?
2S-go-IMPF LIM-plaza
‘Did you go to the plaza?’

o-shim-pa jiwa jl-unga?
2S-see-PAST ahead LIM-fire
‘Did you see the fire up ahead?’

=== Particles ===
Highland Chontal contains three main interrogative particles for inquiring more information, the particles are:

be- ‘where’, nai- ‘who’, and te ‘what’

nai-li-shim-p-o
who-3P.PAST-see-PAST-2S.OBJ
‘Who saw you?’

nai-ko-shim-pa?
who-2S.PAST-see-PAST
‘Who did you see?’

te-ko-na-juohma
what-2S.PAST-buy-RCT.PAST
‘What did you buy?’

be-go-paha
where-2S.PAST-be
‘Where are you?’
