= Tehuantepec District =

- District
- Oaxaca regions and districts: Istmo to Southeast
- Coordinates: 16°19′N 95°13′W
- Country: Mexico
- State: Oaxaca
- Seat: Tehuantepec

Area
  - Metro: 6,180 km^{2} (2,390 sq mi)

Population (2020)
  - District: 251,727

Tehuantepec District is located in the west of the Istmo Region of the State of Oaxaca, Mexico. It includes the cities of Salina Cruz and Tehuantepec.

== Gallery ==
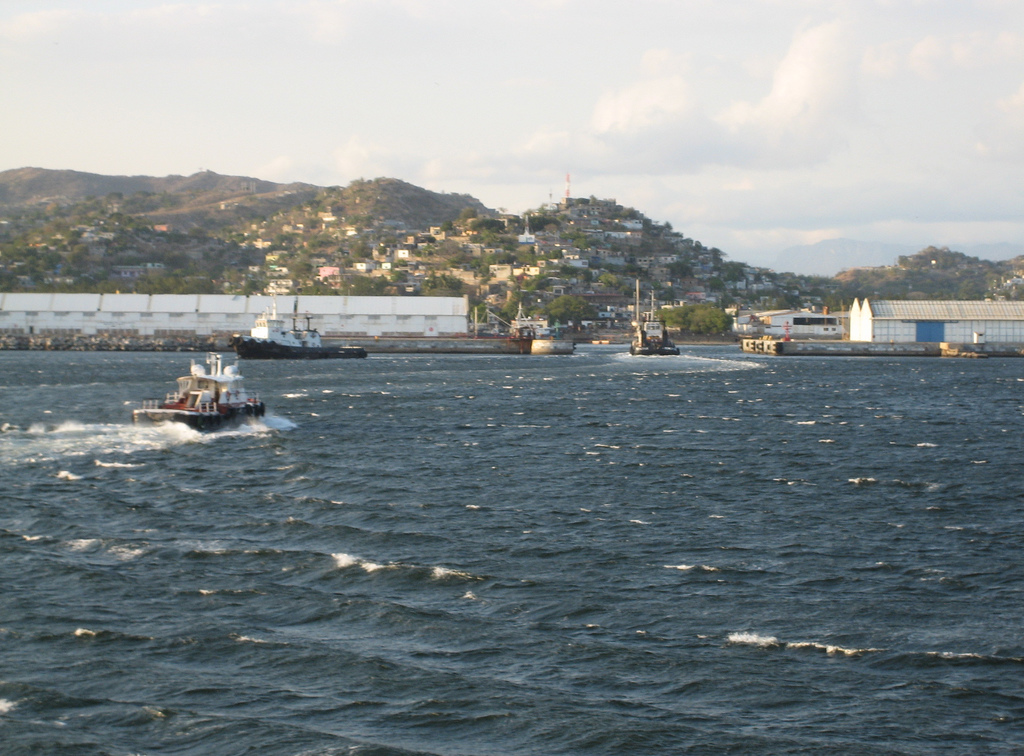
Salina Cruz Bay, the largest and most important port in the state of Oaxaca, Mexico.

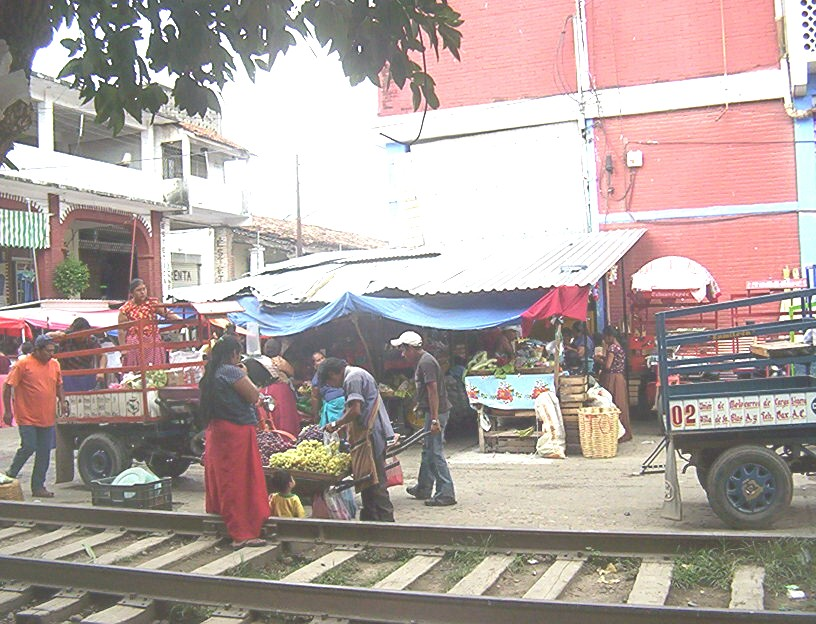
Market in Santo Domingo Tehuantepec

== Municipalities ==
Tehuantepec municipalities

The district includes the following municipalities:

Municipality code	Name	Population		Land Area			Population density	
Municipality code	Name	2020	Rank	km^{2}	sq mi	Rank	2020	Rank
036	Guevea de Humboldt	5,256	8	280.9	108.5	7	19/km^{2} (48/sq mi)	10
052	Magdalena Tequisistlán	5,996	7	840.6	324.6	2	6/km^{2} (15/sq mi)	18
053	Magdalena Tlacotepec	1,297	17	124.4	48.0	14	10/km^{2} (27/sq mi)	14
079	Salina Cruz	84,438	1	131.9	50.9	13	640/km^{2} (1,658/sq mi)	1
124	San Blas Atempa	19,696	3	208.3	80.4	18	95/km^{2} (245/sq mi)	4
248	San Mateo del Mar	15,571	4	89.73	34.64	16	174/km^{2} (449/sq mi)	2
282	San Miguel Tenango	653	19	205.6	79.4	10	3/km^{2} (8/sq mi)	19
305	San Pedro Comitancillo	4,333	11	46.80	18.07	18	93/km^{2} (240/sq mi)	5
307	San Pedro Huamelula	9,735	6	693.9	267.9	4	14/km^{2} (36/sq mi)	12
308	San Pedro Huilotepec	3,307	14	26.50	10.23	19	125/km^{2} (323/sq mi)	3
412	Santa María Guienagati	3,178	15	389.3	150.3	6	8/km^{2} (21/sq mi)	16
418	Santa María Jalapa del Marqués	11,735	5	729.6	281.7	3	16/km^{2} (42/sq mi)	11
421	Santa María Mixtequilla	4,690	9	147.8	57.1	12	32/km^{2} (82/sq mi)	7
440	Santa María Totolapilla	812	18	114	44	15	7/km^{2} (18/sq mi)	17
453	Santiago Astata	3,918	12	186	72	11	21/km^{2} (55/sq mi)	9
470	Santiago Lachiguiri	4,394	10	433	167	5	10/km^{2} (26/sq mi)	15
472	Santiago Laollaga	3,361	13	263.1	101.6	8	13/km^{2} (33/sq mi)	13
508	Santo Domingo Chihuitán	1,618	16	71.06	27.44	17	23/km^{2} (59/sq mi)	8
515	Santo Domingo Tehuantepec	67,739	2	1,198	463	1	57/km^{2} (146/sq mi)	6
	Distrito Tehuantepec	251,727	—	6,180	2,386.11	—	41/km^{2} (105/sq mi)	—
Source: INEGI
