= San Dionisio del Mar =

- Municipality and town
- Location in Mexico
- Coordinates: 16°19′N 94°45′W
- Country: Mexico
- State: Oaxaca

Area
  - Total: 237.3 km^{2} (91.6 sq mi)

Population (2005)
  - Total: 5,165
- Time zone: UTC-6 (Central Standard Time)

San Dionisio del Mar is a town and municipality in Oaxaca in south-western Mexico. It is part of the Juchitán District in the east of the Istmo de Tehuantepec region. The town is named after its patron saint.

== Geography ==
The municipality covers an area of 237.3 km^{2} at an elevation of 10 meters above sea level and includes a peninsula in the Gulf of Tehuantepec on the Pacific coast. The climate is warm sub humid with summer rains. Flora include bushes, mesquite, guanacaste and native grasslands. Wild fauna include iguana, armadillo, opossum, pigeon and rook.

== Demography ==
As of 2005, the municipality had 1,225 households with a total population of 5,165 of whom 2,639 spoke an indigenous language. The municipality is home to the Huave people, who speak a unique language unrelated to any other.

== Economy ==
The main economic activity is fishing. The people also practice agriculture, growing maize, sesame, sorghum, squash and fruit, and keep cattle, horses and pigs.
