= Huave people =

Indigenous people of Mexico

Huave
Ikoots, Kunajts
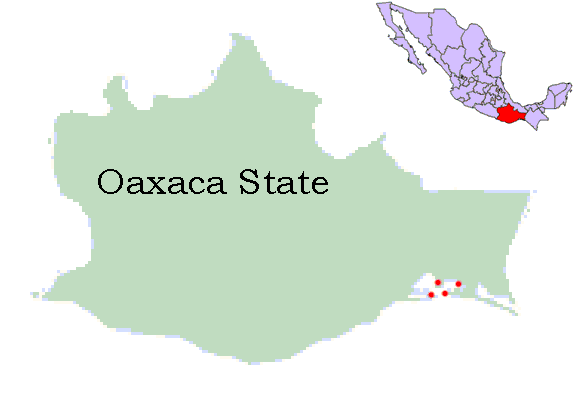
- The four Huave settlements

Total population
- 29,931 (2010)

Regions with significant populations
- Mexico (southeast coast: Juchitán District, Oaxaca)
- San Dionisio del Mar: 4,940 (2000)
- San Francisco del Mar: 3,900 (1990)
- San Mateo del Mar: 12,000 (1990)
- Santa María del Mar: 500 (1993)

Languages
- San Dionisio del Mar Huave, San Francisco del Mar Huave, San Mateo del Mar Huave, San María del Mar Huave, and Spanish

Religion
- Indigenous religion, Roman Catholicism

The Huave (autonyms: Ikoots and Kunajts) are an Indigenous people of Mexico. They have lived the Isthmus of Tehuantepec for more than 3,000 years, preceding the Zapotec people in settling the area. Today they live in several villages (most notably San Mateo del Mar, in the Tehuantepec District, and Santa María del Mar, San Dionisio del Mar and San Francisco del Mar, in the Juchitán District) on the sandspits of the Pacific Ocean and trade marine products with inland neighbors.

According to the 2000 census, 13,687 people declared themselves to be Huave speakers; however, many non-speakers still identify as Huaves or Mareños. Their language is called Huave, ombeayiüts, or umbeyajts, depending on the dialect.

== Name ==
The Huave are all called the Huavi, Huazantecos, or Wabi. Their autonym is Ikoots or Kunajts (the first-person inclusive pronoun, thus meaning "Us"), or Mareños (meaning "Sea People" in Spanish).

== History ==
In the 16th century, Huave settlement extended as far as the coastal region around Tonalá, Chiapas.

== Economy ==
Many Huave people work as fishermen and agriculturalists.

== Social organization ==
Huave families are patrilocal and reside in homes with thatched roofs. Male members of each Huave village belong to the escalafón, which is a community organization for civic and religious affairs.

== Languages ==
Huave people speak four languages, some of which are mutually intelligible: San Dionisio del Mar Huave, San Francisco del Mar Huave, San Mateo del Mar Huave, and San María del Mar Huave. They also speak Spanish.
