= San Francisco del Mar =

- Municipality and town
- Location in Mexico
- Coordinates: 16°20′N 94°31′W
- Country: Mexico
- State: Oaxaca

Area
  - Total: 400.61 km^{2} (154.68 sq mi)

Population (2005)
  - Total: 6,874
- Time zone: UTC-6 (Central Standard Time)

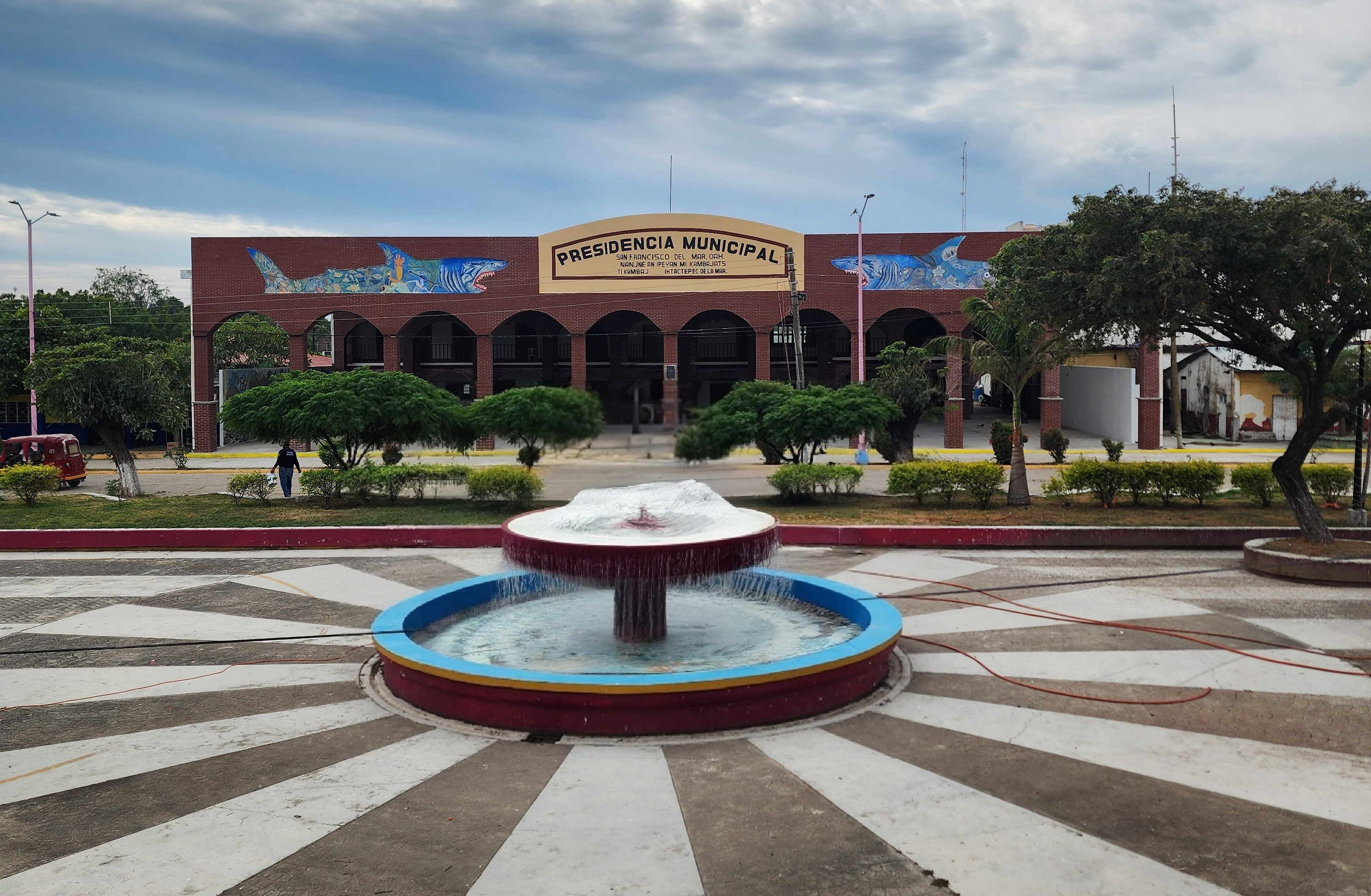
San Francisco del Mar Municipal Palace

San Francisco del Mar is a town and municipality in Oaxaca in south-western Mexico. It is part of the Juchitán District in the west of the Istmo de Tehuantepec region.

== Geography ==
The municipality covers an area of 400.61 km^{2} at an elevation of 10 meters above sea level on the Pacific coast. The climate is warm, subhumid with summer rains and strong winds blowing from south to north.

=== Flora and fauna ===
Flora include trees and shrubs such as Guanacaste, Tepehuaje, Pochote, Tepescohuite, Mango, Lemon, Tamarind and Coconut. Wild fauna include Coyote, Mazatec, Bobcat, Opossum, Armadillo and Pigeon.

== Demography ==
As of 2005, the municipality had 1,517 households with a total population of 6,874 of whom 926 spoke an indigenous language. The municipality is home to the Huave people, who speak a unique language unrelated to any other.

== Economy ==
The main economic activity is fishing, The people also grow maize, sorghum, sesame, watermelon, melon, and mango, and raise some livestock. Tourists are attracted for sport fishing and for the traditional festival in April.
