= Huamelultec language =

Chontal language of Oaxaca, Mexico

Huamelultec
- Lowland Oaxaca Chontal
- Native to: Mexico
- Region: San Pedro Huamelula, Oaxaca
- Native speakers: (1,100 cited 2000)
- Language family: Hokan ?: Tequistlatecan; Huamelultec

Language codes
- ISO 639-3: clo
- Glottolog: lowl1260
- ELP: Lowland Chontal

Huamelultec (also known as Huamelula Chontal, Lowland Oaxaca Chontal, or Chontal de la Costa de Oaxaca) is one of the Chontal languages of Oaxaca, Mexico. It is spoken in the Oaxacan municipalities of San Pedro Huamelula (settlements of Barra de la Cruz, El Bejuco, El Coyul, El Gavilán, El Limón, El Porvenir, Guayacán, Los Cocos, Maximino Cruz (Rancho Maximino Cruz), Morro Ayuta, Paja Blanca, Río Papaya, Río Seco, San Isidro Chacalapa, San Pedro Huamelula, Santa María (Santa María Huamelula), and Tapanala), Santiago Astata (settlements of La Cotorra, La Tortolita (Fraccionamiento la Tortolita), Santiago Astata, Zaachila, and Zaachilac), and Tehuantepec (settlement of Morro Mazatán). The name has been misspelled Tlamelula.

== Phonology ==
=== Vowels ===
	Front	Back
Close	i	u
Mid	e	o
Open	a	

=== Consonants ===
		Labial	Alveolar		Palato- alveolar	Palatal	Velar	Glottal
		Labial	central	palatal	Palato- alveolar	Palatal	Velar	Glottal
Plosive	voiceless	p	t	tʲ			k	ʔ
Plosive	voiced	b	d				ɡ	
Plosive	ejective						kʼ	
Affricate	voiceless		ts		tʃ			
Affricate	ejective		tsʼ		tʃʼ			
Fricative	voiceless	f	s		ʃ		x	
Fricative	lateral		ɬ	ɬʲ				
Fricative	glottalized	fʼ	ɬʼ					
Nasal	central	m	n	nʲ			(ŋ)	
Nasal	glottalized	mʼ	nʼ					
Rhotic	tap		ɾ					
Rhotic	trill		r					
Approximant	central	w				j		
Approximant	lateral		l	lʲ				
Approximant	glottalized	wʼ	lʼ					

- /n/ is regularly pronounced as [ŋ] when in coda position, unless followed by an alveolar consonant.
- Glottalized sounds /fʼ, ɬʼ/ are also said to have been pronounced as affricates [pɸʼ], [tɬʼ].

== See also ==
- Huamelultec vocabulary list on the Spanish Wikipedia
