= Tequistlatecan languages =

Language group

Tequistlatec
- Chontal
- Geographic distribution: Oaxaca
- Native speakers: 5,600 (not counting 1,700 speakers of unidentified "Chontal") (2020 census)
- Linguistic classification: Hokan ?: Tequistlatecan–Tolan ?; Tequistlatec
- Subdivisions: Highland Chontal; Coastal Chontal

Language codes
- Glottolog: tequ1244
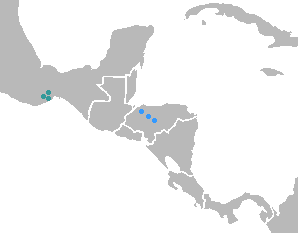
- The Tequistlatecan languages are in Mexico at the left of the map.

The Tequistlatecan languages, also called Chontal, are three close but distinct languages spoken or once spoken by the Chontal people of Oaxaca State, Mexico.

Chontal was spoken by 6,000 or so people in 2020.

== Languages ==
The Tequistlatecan languages are:

- Huamelultec (Lowland Oaxaca Chontal)
- †Tequistlatec
- Highland Oaxaca Chontal

== Name ==
Although most authors use the form tequistlatec(an) today, this is based on an improper derivation in Nahuatl (the correct derivation from Tequisistlán would be Tequisistec(an), and both terms were used by Sapir interchangeably).

== Classification ==
The Tequistlatecan languages are part of the proposed Hokan family, but are often considered to be a distinct family. Campbell and Oltrogge (1980) proposed that the Tequistlatecan languages may be related to Jicaquean (see Tolatecan), but this hypothesis has not been generally accepted.
