= Istmo de Tehuantepec =

- Region
- Oaxaca regions - Istmo de Tehuantepec to the east
- Coordinates: 16°10′57″N 95°11′45″W
- Country: Mexico
- State: Oaxaca
- Largest settlement: Juchitán de Zaragoza

Area
  - Total: 19,356 km^{2} (7,473 sq mi)

Population (2020)
  - Total: 633,518

Istmo de Tehuantepec is the largest region of the state of Oaxaca, located in southeastern Mexico.

== Geography ==
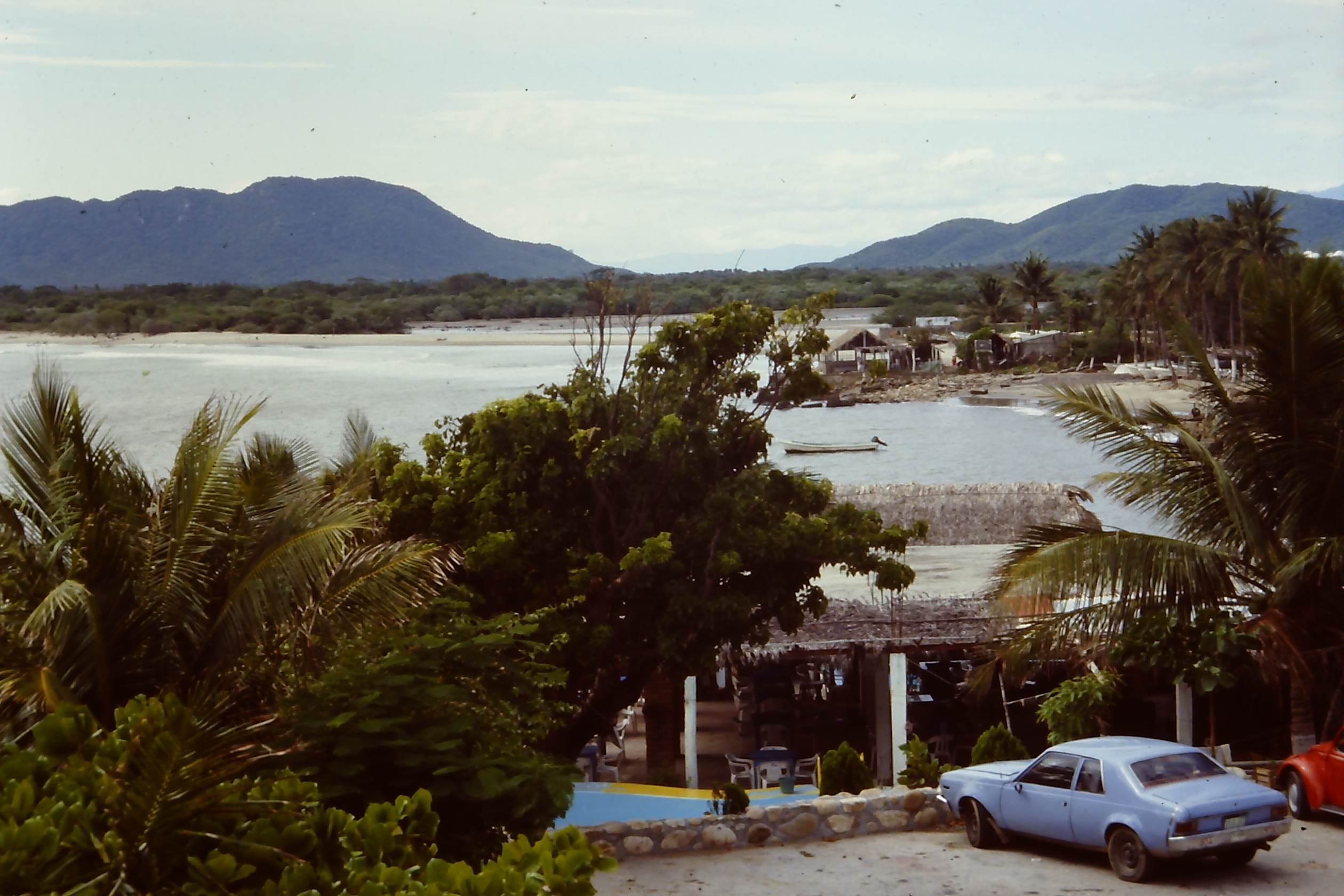
Istmo coast on the Gulf of Tehuantepec.

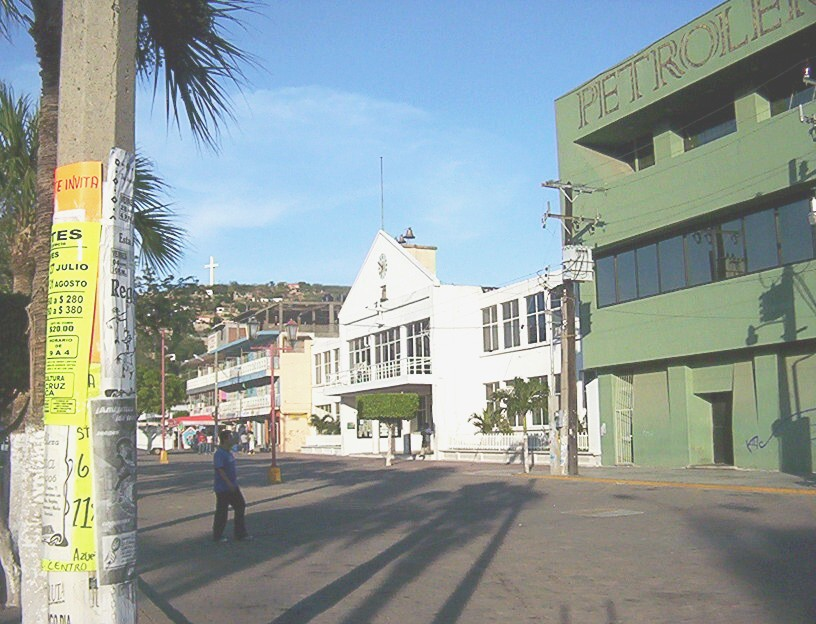
Salina Cruz, the largest city in Istmo de Tehuantepec.

It covers the southern part of the Isthmus of Tehuantepec, the shortest route between the Gulf of Mexico and the Pacific Ocean before the Panama Canal was opened.

The Istmo region has two districts, Juchitán District and Tehuantepec District, and 41 municipalities.

The region contain the largest part of the Selva Zoque (Zoque Forest) ecological region, that extends into adjacent Veracruz and Chiapas states. It is an area of significant ecological importance, including the largest intact tropical cloud forest in Central America. It also has lowland tropical rainforests, tropical dry forests, Sierra Madre de Oaxaca pine-oak forests and Sierra Madre del Sur pine-oak forests, and Chimalapas montane forests. The forest is also home to 300 species of native orchids, representing 27% of known Mexican orchid species and 60% of recorded Mexican orchid genera.

== Economy ==
The region has cement and lime plants. The main industry is the Pemex oil refinery in the port of Salina Cruz, the largest city in Istmo de Tehuantepec, located on the Pacific coast at the Gulf of Tehuantepec. The isthmus has extensive livestock production operations. Crops include sesame, coffee, rice, sorghum, pineapple, banana, coconut, melon, and sugarcane. Fishing cooperatives harvest shrimp and other seafood from the Pacific.

The government has plans to develop the trans-Isthmus of Tehuantepec corridor, including improving transportation routes, developing an industrial zone along the highway, and expanding the petroleum and petrochemical industries in Salina Cruz. Other plans include creating coffee plantations and cattle corridors; expanding production of beans, maize, and chili; and exploiting the bio-genetic resources of native medicinal plants.

The proposed 2021 budget contemplates MXN $4,133 billion (US $199.3 million), and 18.% increase over 2020, for the Corredor Multimodal Interoceánico Istmo de Tehuantepec (Interoceanic Corridor of the Isthmus of Tehuantepec).

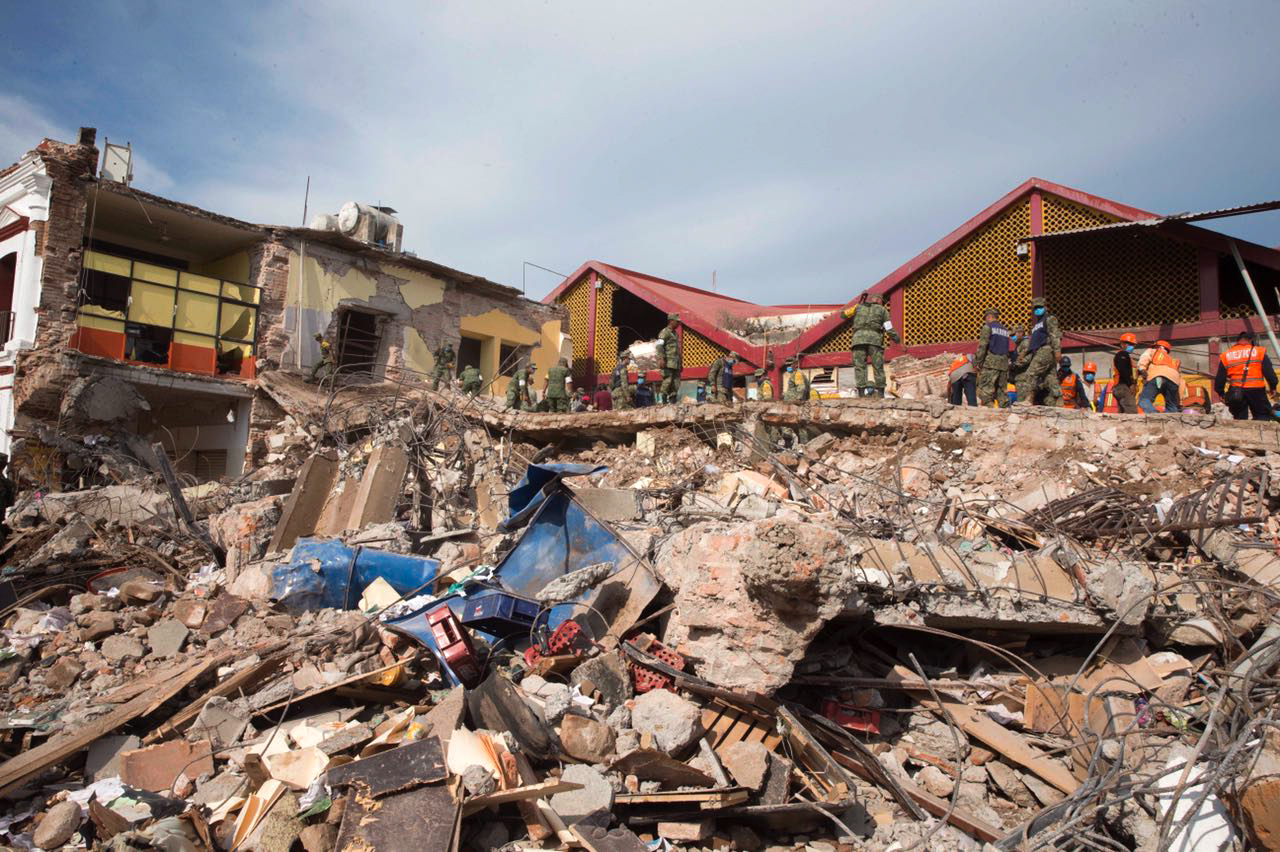
Aftermath of the 2017 Chiapas earthquake in the Istmo region.

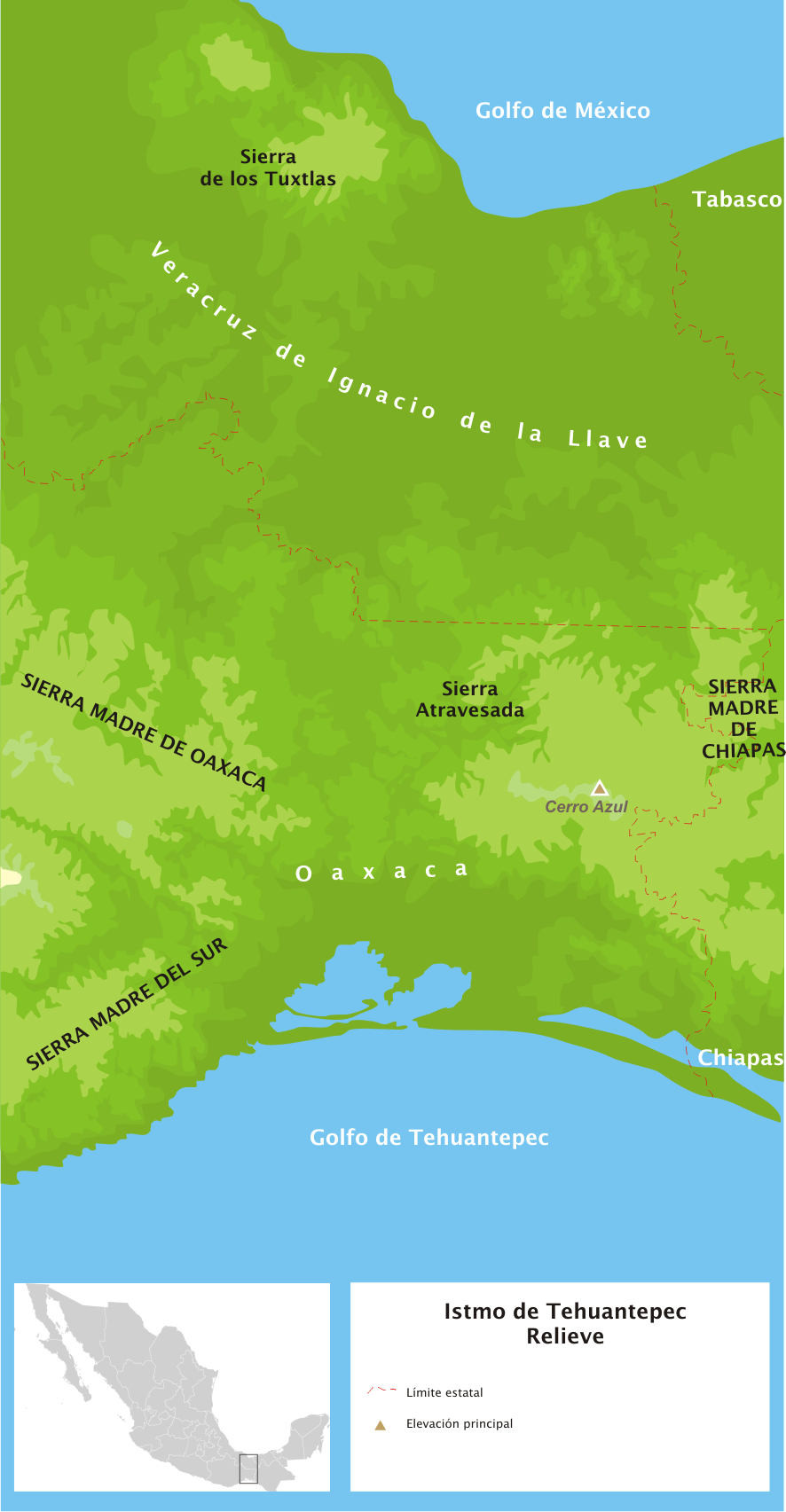
Isthmus of Tehuantepec map.

== 2017 Chiapas earthquake ==
The 2017 Chiapas earthquake severely damaged buildings in the region on 7 September 2017. It measured 8.2 on the moment magnitude scale and a maximum Mercalli intensity of IX (Violent) and occurred approximately 87 kilometres (54 mi) south of Pijijiapan off the Chiapas coast in the Gulf of Tehuantepec.

== See also ==
- Istmo de Tehuantepec Region topics
