= Chinantla (disambiguation) =

Chinantla (also La Chinantla) is a cultural and biological region in the Mexican state of Oaxaca.

Chinantla or La Chinantla may also refer to:

- Chinantla (municipality), in the Mexican state of Puebla
  - Chinantla, Puebla, the main town in that municipality
- La Chinantla, a town in the Mexican state of Veracruz
