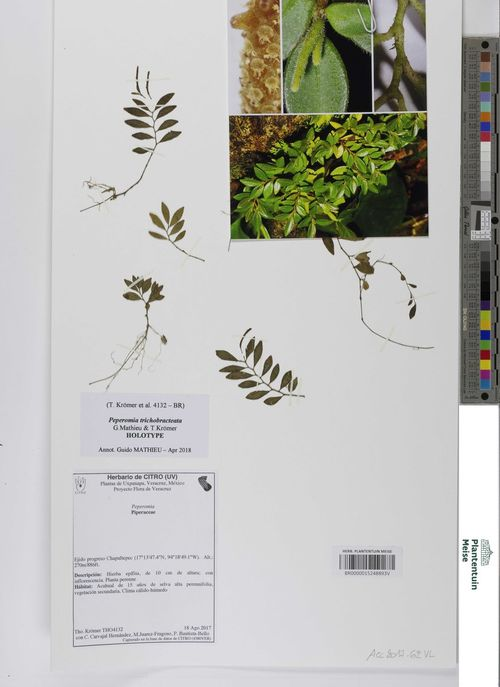

Scientific classification
- Kingdom: Plantae
- Clade: Tracheophytes
- Clade: Angiosperms
- Clade: Magnoliids
- Order: Piperales
- Family: Piperaceae
- Genus: Peperomia
- Species: P. trichobracteata

Binomial name
- Peperomia trichobracteata G.Mathieu & T.Krömer

= Peperomia trichobracteata =

Species of flowering plant

Peperomia trichobracteata is a species of epiphyte in the genus Peperomia that is endemic in Mexico. It primarily grows on wet tropical biomes. Its conservation status is Threatened.

== Description ==
The first specimens where collected in Uxpanapa.

Peperomia trichobracteata isa small epiphytic herb up to 10 cm tall. The stems are 2-4 branched from the base, erect horizontally, sometimes geniculate. Its internodes are 5-10 mm long, slightly thicker just above the node, the foliar scars are distinct and elevated. It doesn't feature internodal ribs, densely hairy, curved trichomes, appressed at the tip. It has stolons from the base with internodes being 1-1.5 cm long. The leaves alternate, distichous, subopposite from the base of the inflorescences with petioles being 1-2 mm long, sulcate. The sulcus is less prominent in older leaves, glabrous to moderately hairy, its trichomes curved in an apical direction. The stamen is elliptic to obovate being 2-3 x 0.7-0.9 cm. Its tip is acute and rounded in the basal leaves. The base is acute, with the margin being entirely ciliate, both sides pubescent with trichomes curved towards the tip, both side clear hyaline dotted. Its adaxial dots are often denser near the margin with an adaxial central nerve. The leaf has its only central nerve visible and slightly sunken, white-dark green. Its inflorescence has 1-2 spadices together. The second spadix is subtended by the reduced leaf. Its peduncle is 4-5 mm long and 1 cm white. Its stamens are 2 mm long with white short filaments. Its ovary is round with the stigma at the tip. The mature fruits aren't seen. Its rachis is a bent glabrous papillose that can reach up to 2-3 cm long and 2-3 mm wide. Its flowers are densely disposed from the rachial pits. Its floral bracts are round being 0.4 mm wide.

This species resembles Peperomia castilloi and Peperomia xalana. Between this species of P. castilloi, leaves show an average length to width ratio of 3 and 2.5 respectively while P. xalana has the average ratio of 5. When flowering, this species is easily recognized by its thick and bent inflorescences and the conspicuous trichomes of the floral bract margin.

== Taxonomy and Naming ==
It was described in 2018 by Guido Mathieu in Phytotaxa 369, from specimens collected by Thorsten Krömer. The epithet is inspired by the presence of conspicuous trichomes on the margin of the floral bracts, a characteristic rarely seen in the genus.

== Distribution and Habitat ==
It is endemic in Mexico, specifically Uxpanapa. It grows on a epiphyte environment at an altitude of 75-280 meters. It grows on wet tropical biomes. It flowers in August.

== Conservation ==
This species is assessed as Threatened, in a preliminary report.
