= Santo Domingo Ingenio =

- Municipality and town
- Nickname: Sto. Dom. Ing.
- Location in Mexico
- Coordinates: 16°35′N 94°46′W
- Country: Mexico
- State: Oaxaca

Area
  - Total: 354.68 km^{2} (136.94 sq mi)
- Elevation: 40 m (130 ft)

Population (2005)
  - Total: 7,299
- Time zone: UTC-6 (Central Standard Time)

Santo Domingo Ingenio is a town and municipality in Oaxaca in south-western Mexico. It is part of the Juchitán District in the west of the Istmo de Tehuantepec region.

== Geography ==
The municipality covers an area of 354.68 km^{2} at an average elevation of 40 meters above sea level. The town lies on the Pan-American highway, connecting it to Santiago Niltepec and Juchitán de Zaragoza. The land is generally flat, part of the Pacific coastal plain of the Isthmus, with some hills in the northern part.

=== Hydrography ===
Some streams flow northward, feeding the Coatzacoalcos River, while the Chicapa River flows south towards the Laguna Superior. The climate is warm, with annual rainfall averaged 1050 mm, mostly falling in the summer.

=== Flora and fauna ===
Flora include Guanacaste, ceiba, teposcohuite, kapok tree, and fruit trees and pastures. Wild fauna include armadillo, rabbit, coyote, opossum and birds common to the region.

== Demography ==
As of 2005, the municipality had 2,033 households with a total population of 7,299 people, of whom 465 spoke an indigenous language.

== Economy ==
The main economic activity is agriculture, with crops such as maize, sorghum, peanuts, watermelon, melon, sweet potato, cucumber, pumpkin, sesame and sugar cane. The community has a sugar mill. Farmers also raise cattle, goats, pigs.
