= Juchitán District =

- District
- Oaxaca regions and districts: Istmo to the east
- Coordinates: 16°26′N 95°01′W
- Country: Mexico
- State: Oaxaca

Area
  - Land: 13,176 km^{2} (5,087 sq mi)

Population (2020)
  - Total: 381,791

Juchitán District is located in the east of the Istmo de Tehuantepec region of the State of Oaxaca, Mexico and the easternmost district in Oaxaca, covering the southern part of a low-lying corridor through the mountains that separates the Gulf of Mexico from the Pacific Ocean. The district has an area of 13,176 km^{2} and a population as of 2020 of 381,791.

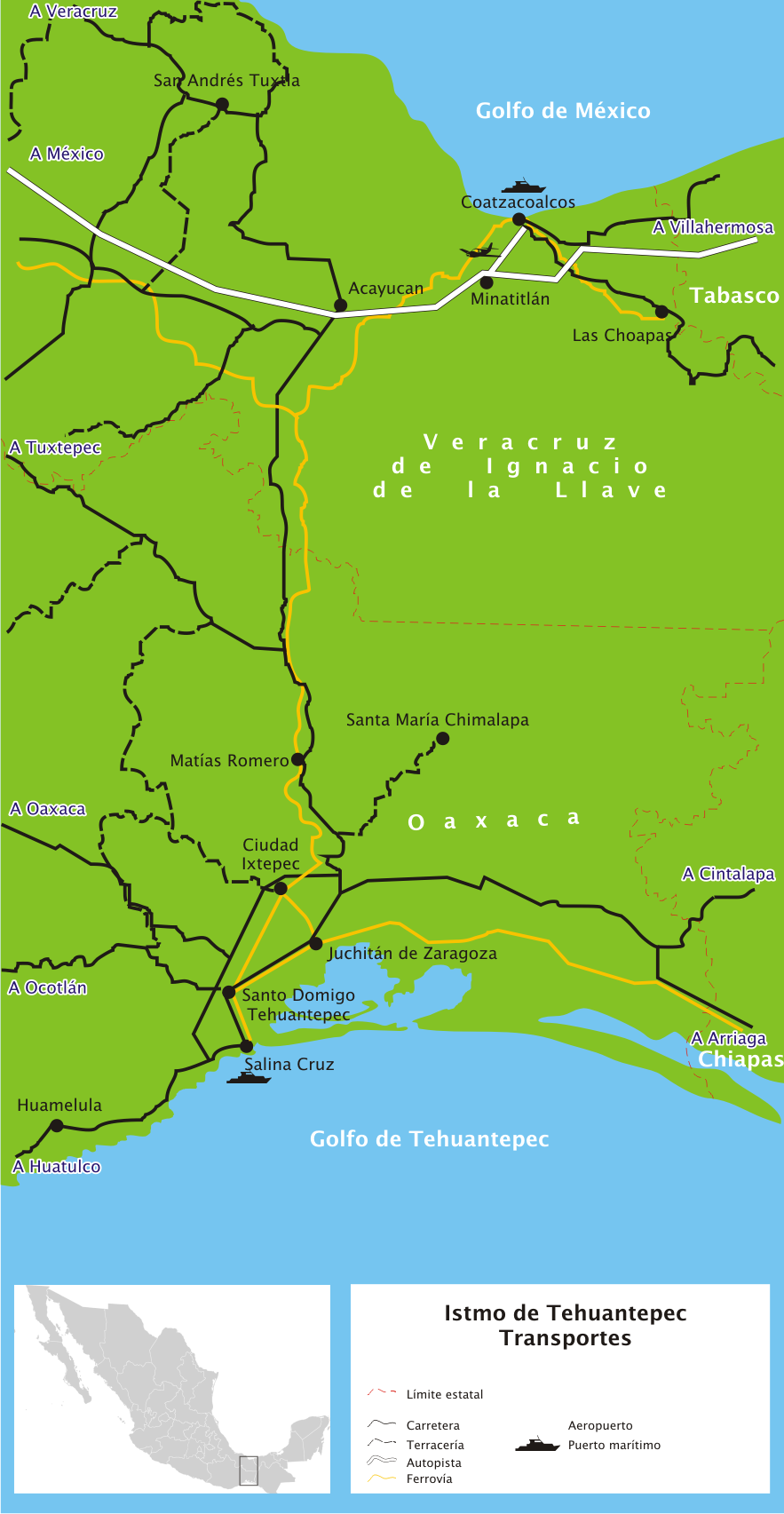
Isthmus of Tehuantepec road and railways. Juchitán in the south

== Environment ==
The climate is warm. The district is relatively flat in the southern coastal plain, bounded by lagoons and then the ocean. Inland to the north it is hillier, rising to the crest of the isthmus and then descending towards the Veracruz coastal plain of the Gulf of Mexico. The land rises to mountains to the West (Sierra Madre de Oaxaca) and the East (Sierra Madre de Chiapas). The municipalities of Santa María Chimalapa and San Miguel Chimalapa contain a large part of the Selva Zoque, the largest tract of tropical rainforest in Mexico, which contains the majority of terrestrial biodiversity in the country.

== Economy ==
Other than in the towns of the trans-isthmus corridor in the west of the district, most people are engaged in agriculture. Near the coast, there is fishing activity, and in some inland areas fine lumber is extracted for use in furniture making. The government has plans to develop the trans-isthmus corridor. This includes improving transportation routes across the isthmus between the Caribbean and the Pacific, and developing an industrial zone along the highway. Other plans include creating coffee plantations and cattle corridors, expanding production of beans, maize and chili and exploiting the bio-genetic resources of native medicinal plants.

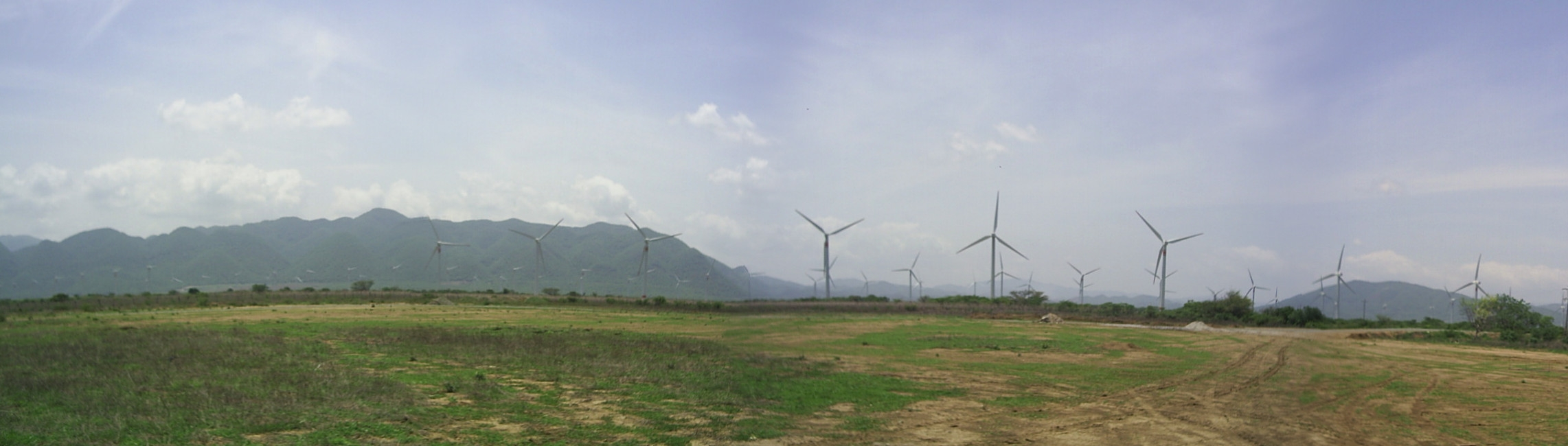
La Venta wind farm

The isthmus has reliable, dominant north-south winds. Some pilot wind farms have been built, notably at La Venta. There are plans to build more, although there has been local resistance due to the communal ownership of land and concerns that the annual rental prices offered are too low A plan first proposed in 1977 for a dam in Los Chimalapas has been stalled due to environmental concerns. In June 2008 the State of Oaxaca was again proposing construction of a storage dam in the El Corte River basin in the Chimalapa sub-region, with the potential to irrigate 100,000 hectares of the Isthmus of Tehuantepec and to supply water to the Salina Cruz Refinery.

== Municipalities ==
Municipalities in Juchitán District

The district includes the following municipalities:

Municipality code	Name	Population		Land Area			Population density	
Municipality code	Name	2020	Rank	km^{2}	sq mi	Rank	2020	Rank
005	Asunción Ixtaltepec	15,261	7	658.9	254.4	7	23/km^{2} (60/sq mi)	14
025	Chahuites	11,356	11	22.67	8.75	21	501/km^{2} (1,297/sq mi)	2
014	Ciudad Ixtepec	28,082	4	294.1	113.6	13	95/km^{2} (247/sq mi)	7
010	El Barrio de La Soledad	13,474	9	485.9	187.6	10	28/km^{2} (72/sq mi)	12
030	El Espinal	8,730	15	56.06	21.64	18	156/km^{2} (403/sq mi)	3
043	Juchitán de Zaragoza	113,570	1	911.3	351.9	4	125/km^{2} (323/sq mi)	4
047	Matías Romero	38,183	2	28.17	10.88	20	1,355/km^{2} (3,511/sq mi)	1
075	Reforma de Pineda	2,660	21	33.7	13.0	19	79/km^{2} (204/sq mi)	9
130	San Dionisio del Mar	5,180	20	354.9	137.0	11	15/km^{2} (38/sq mi)	17
141	San Francisco del Mar	8,710	16	678.1	261.8	6	13/km^{2} (33/sq mi)	18
198	San Juan Guichicovi	29,802	3	797	308	5	37/km^{2} (97/sq mi)	11
265	San Miguel Chimalapa	6,711	18	1,184	457	2	6/km^{2} (15/sq mi)	20
327	San Pedro Tapanatepec	15,479	6	993.7	383.7	3	16/km^{2} (40/sq mi)	16
407	Santa María Chimalapa	9,578	12	4,547	1,756	1	2/km^{2} (5/sq mi)	21
407	Santa María Petapa	16,706	5	155.7	60.1	15	107/km^{2} (278/sq mi)	5
441	Santa María Xadani	9,234	13	86.07	33.23	17	107/km^{2} (278/sq mi)	6
066	Santiago Niltepec	5,342	19	547.6	211.4	9	10/km^{2} (25/sq mi)	19
505	Santo Domingo Ingenio	7,681	17	199.2	76.9	14	39/km^{2} (100/sq mi)	10
513	Santo Domingo Petapa	9,027	14	339.7	131.2	12	27/km^{2} (69/sq mi)	13
525	Santo Domingo Zanatepec	12,483	10	646.2	249.5	8	19/km^{2} (50/sq mi)	15
557	Unión Hidalgo	14,542	8	155.7	60.1	16	93/km^{2} (242/sq mi)	8
	Distrito Juchitán	381,791	—	13,176	5,087.28	—	29/km^{2} (75/sq mi)	—
Source: INEGI

== Gallery ==
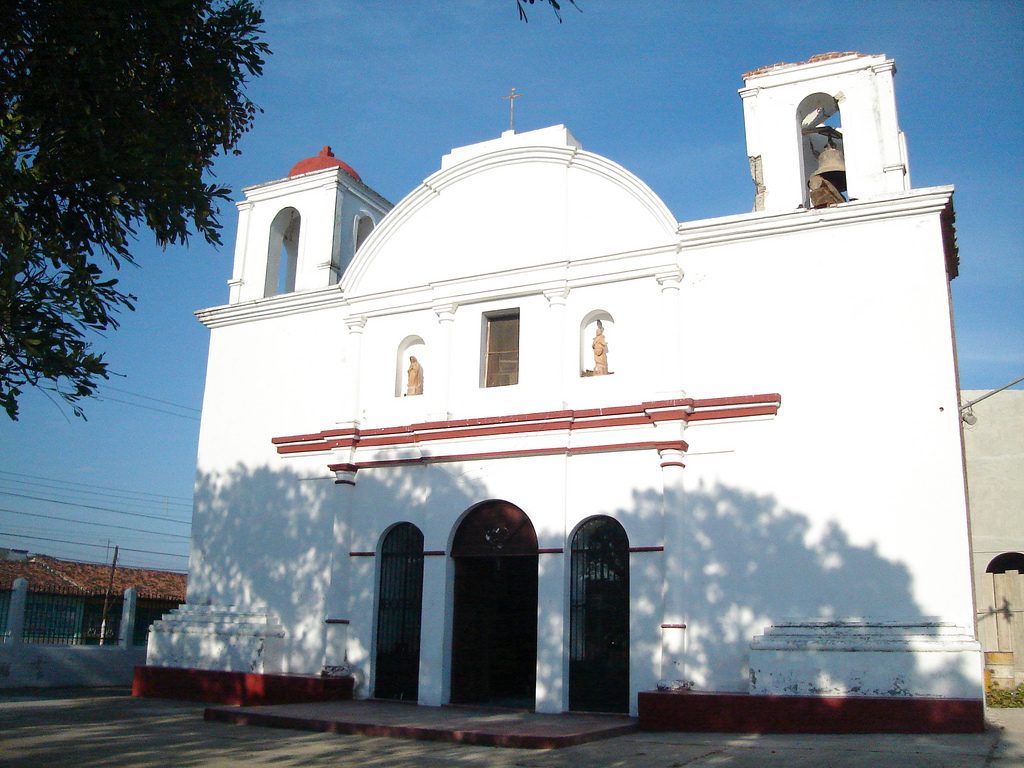
Church of the Virgin of Asunción

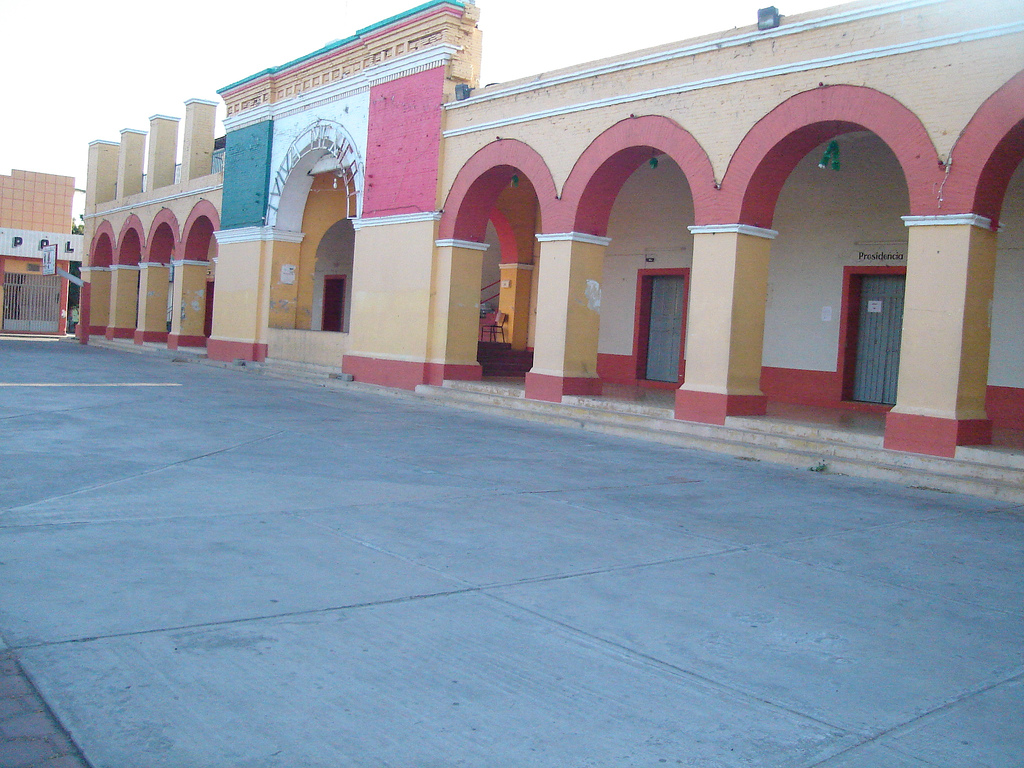
Municipal Palace of Asunción

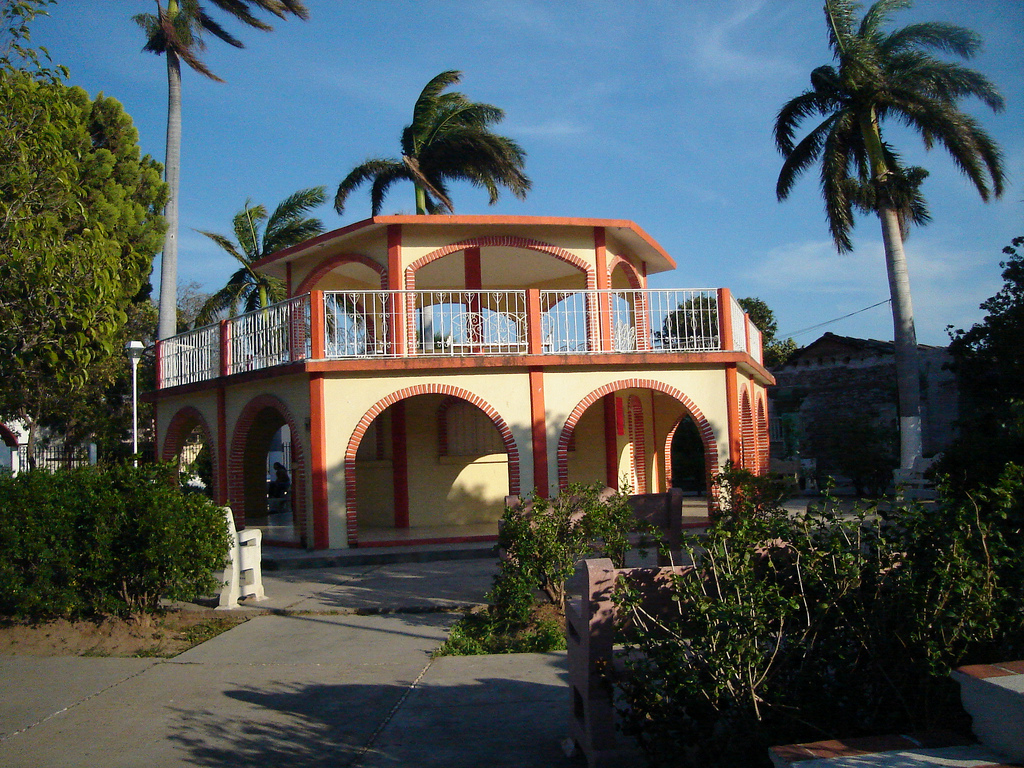
Kiosk in the Jesus Rasgado park, of Asunción

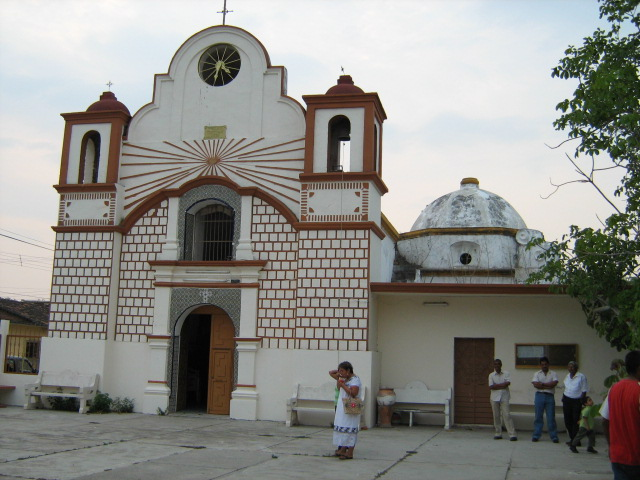
Church in Espinal

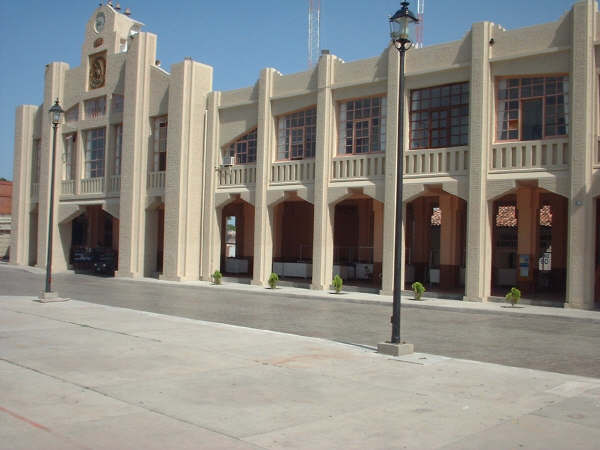
Palacio Municipal in Ciudad Ixtepec

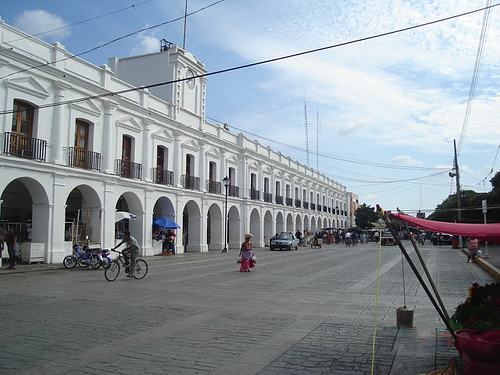
Juchitán Municipal Palace

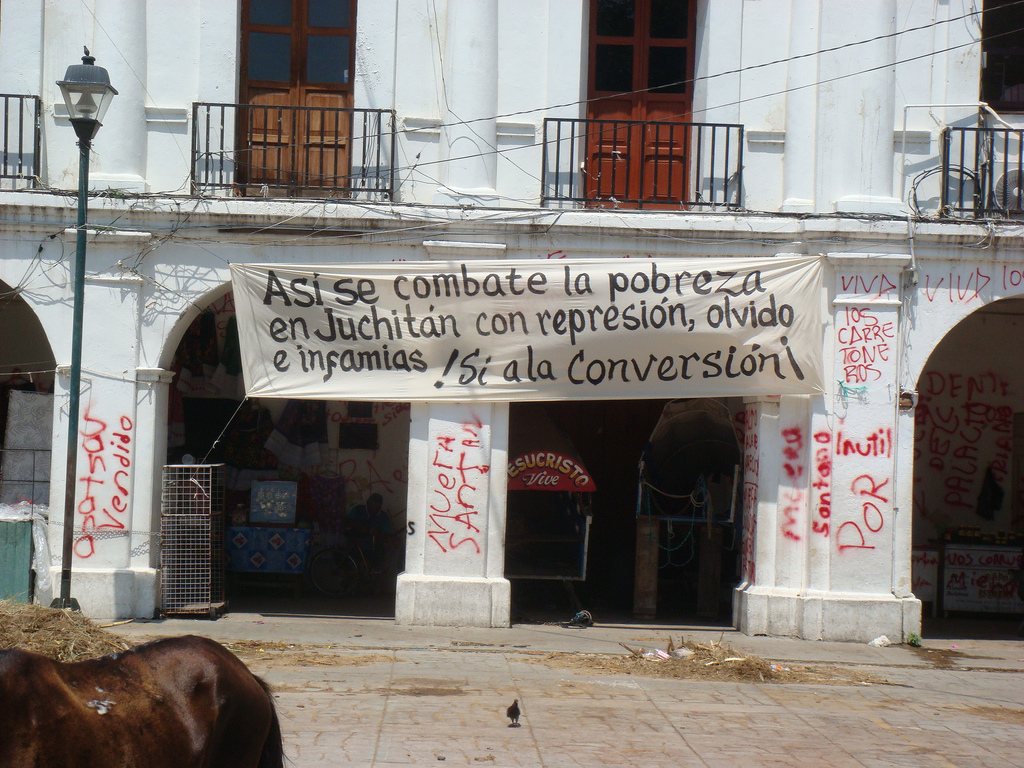
Graffiti in Juchitán

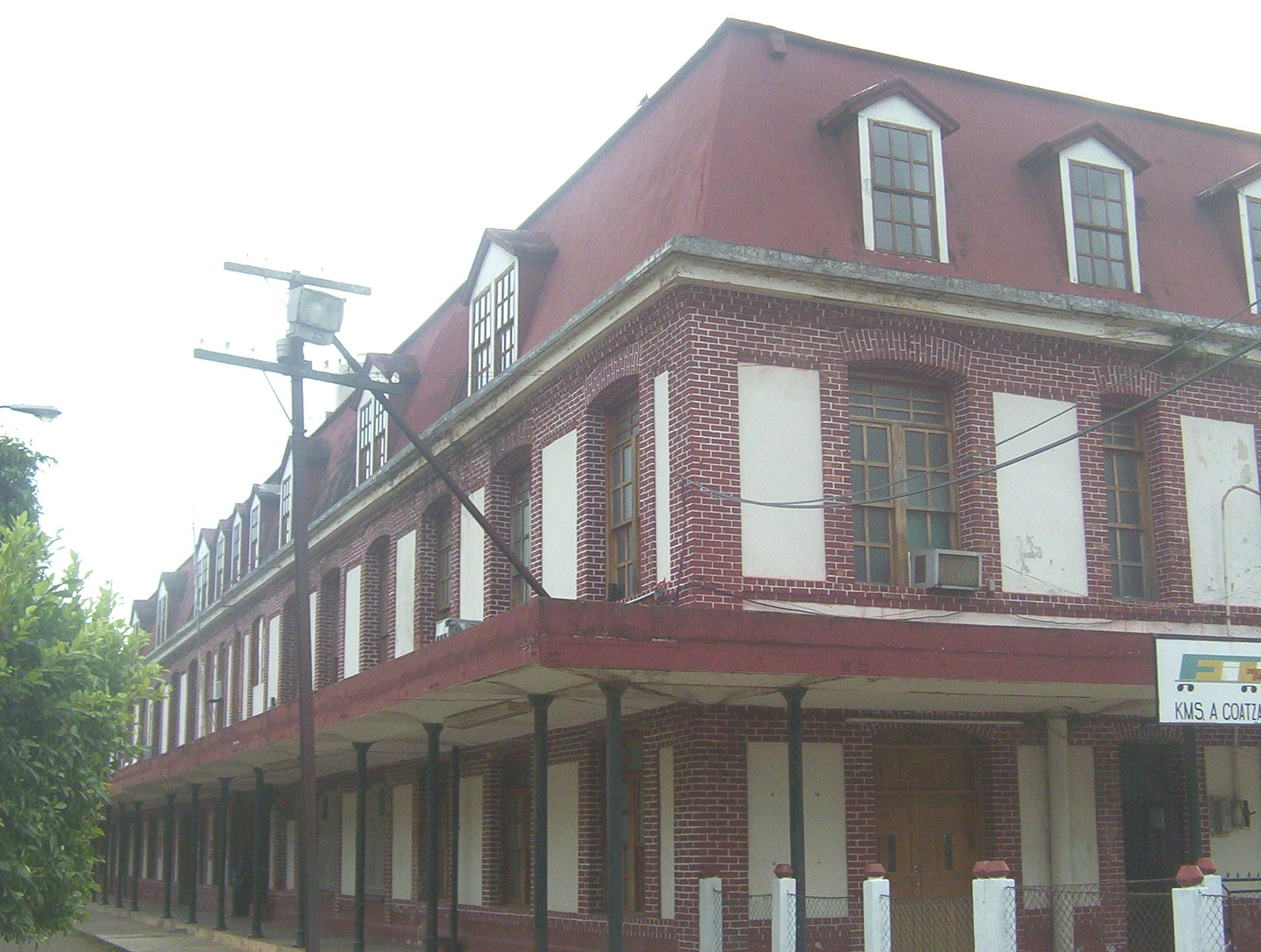
Railway Station, the landmark of Matias Romero

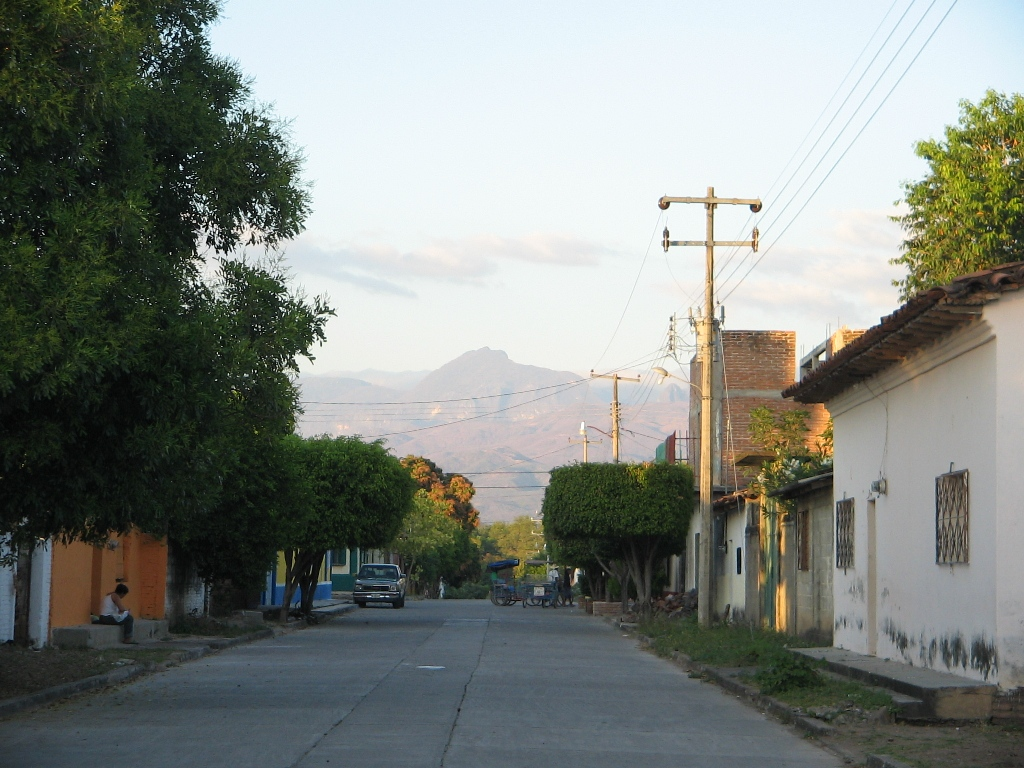
Street in Santo Domingo Zanatepec
