= Uspanapa River =

Uspanapa Uxpanapa, Uzpanapa
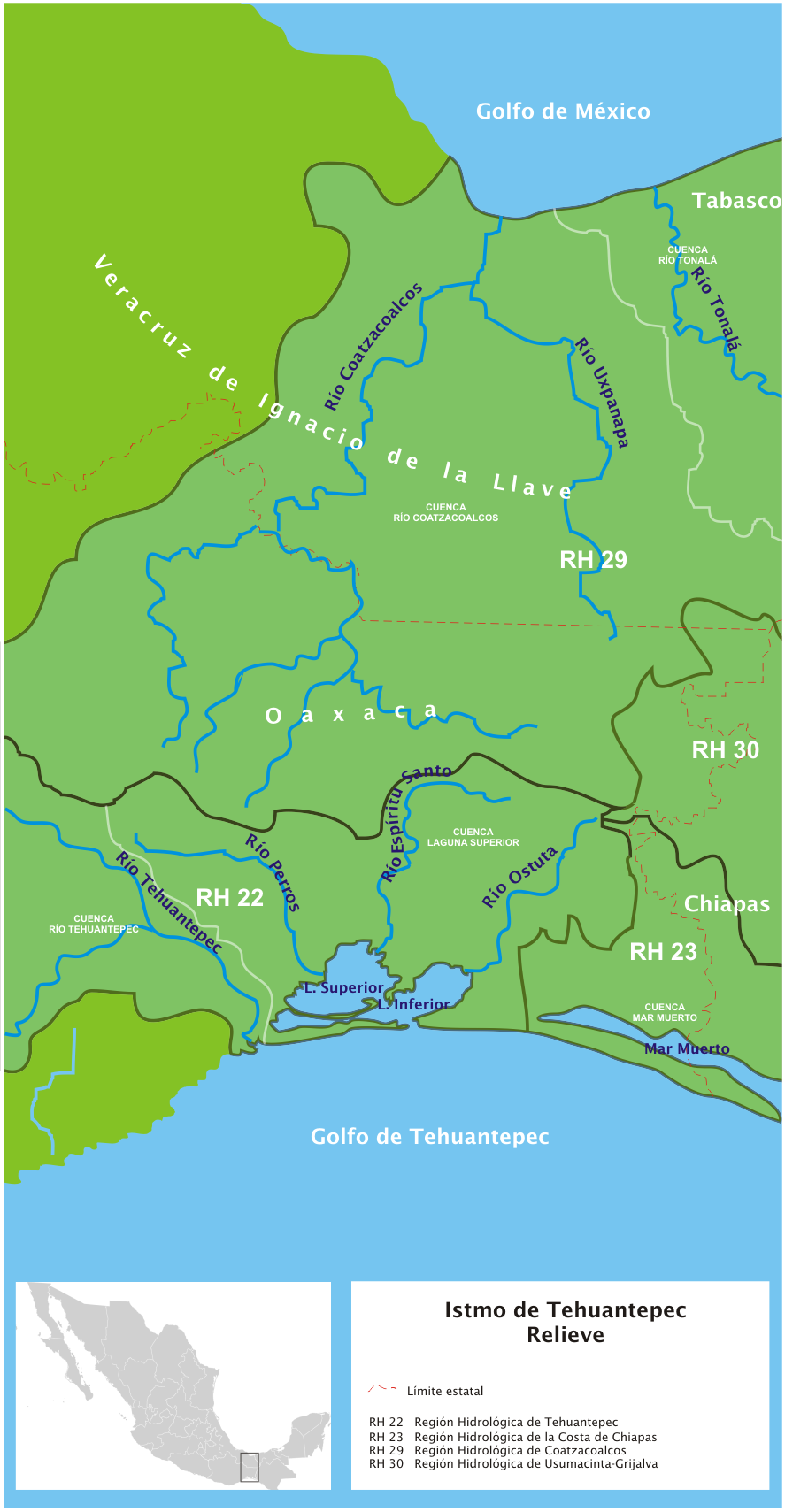

Location
- Country: Mexico
- State: Oaxaca, Veracruz
- Region: Isthmus of Tehuantepec

Physical characteristics
- Source
  - coordinates: 17°6′54″N 94°16′59″W
- Mouth: Coatzacoalcos River
  - coordinates: 17°58′14″N 94°28′30″W

The Uspanapa River, also known as the Uxpanapa or Uzpanapa, is a river of Mexico. It originates in the foothills of Sierra Atravesada subrange of the Sierra Madre de Chiapas mountains in the state of Oaxaca. It flows through the Selva Zoque and the municipio of Uxpanapa in the state of Veracruz from which it takes its name. It is a tributary of the Coatzacoalcos River, which it joins downstream from the city of Minatitlán and upstream from Nanchital.

== See also ==
- List of rivers of Mexico
