= Tusch =

Tusch is a surname. Notable people with the surname include:

- Maria Tusch (1868–1939), Austrian trade unionist
- Mary E. Tusch (1874/1875–1960), American known as the "Mother of Aviators"
