= Selva Zoque =

Area of ecological importance in Mexico

Coordinates: 16°56′20.10″N 94°46′18.63″W

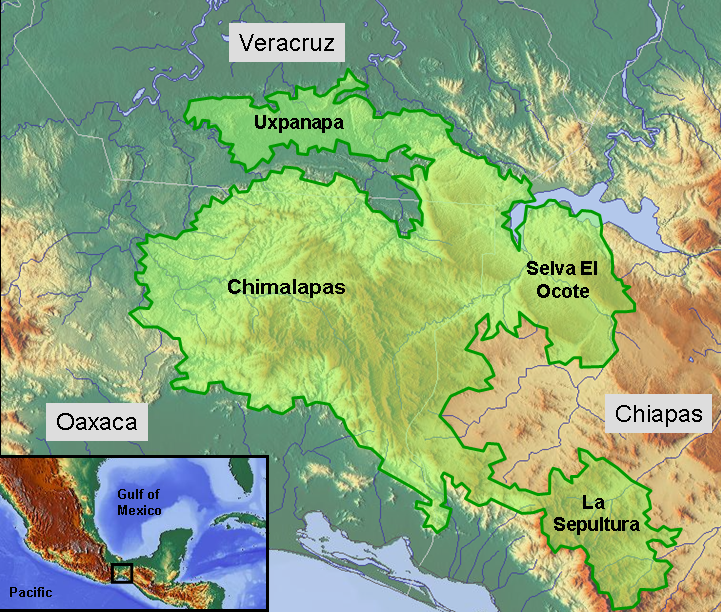
Selva Zoque region of Southern Mexico

The Selva Zoque (English: Zoque Forest), which includes the Chimalapas rain forest, is an area of great ecological importance in Mexico. Most of the forest lies in the state of Oaxaca but parts are in Chiapas and Veracruz. It is the largest tract of tropical rainforest in Mexico, and contains the majority of terrestrial biodiversity in the country. The forest includes the Selva El Ocote, a federally-protected biosphere reserve, but is otherwise not yet protected. Despite the rich ecology of the region, a 2003 study that focused on bird populations stated that "the fauna of the heart of the Chimalapas, including its vast rainforests, have seen little or no study". As it is an impoverished region, efforts to preserve the ecology are often at odds with demands to improve the economy.

== Geography ==
The forest lies between 16°00'32"N, 17°32'00"N, 93°21'40"W and 94°53'53"W in the eastern part of the mountain range that forms the spine of the Isthmus of Tehuantepec. The terrain is rugged and includes a complex mixture of forest types at different levels. Geologically, the region dates from the Upper Cretaceous and the Cenozoic. Elevations range from 100m to 2,700m. Average monthly temperatures in most areas range between 18 °C and 22 °C, and annual rainfall between 500 and 2,500 mm, with high humidity throughout most of the region although there are dry interior valleys. In some of the higher areas, mean annual temperatures are as low as 13 °C.

Excluding the Uxpanapa and La Sepultura extensions, the forest region covers about one million hectares. The main Chimalapas region in Oaxaca covers approximately 600,000 hectares. The forest contains the headwaters of five hydrological systems: the El Corte River watershed, the Negro River watershed, which feeds the Nezahualcoyotl (Malpaso) Dam, the Uxpanapa River watershed and the Coatzacoalcos River which flow into Veracruz's southern wetlands and the Gulf of Mexico; and the Espiritu Santo River watershed which supplies the lagoon system to the south in the Pacific Ocean.

== Vegetation ==
The region has highly diverse plant communities. For example, over 300 orchid species have been identified, 60% of all orchid genera in Mexico. Over 200 canopy tree species have been found in the Uxpanapa lowlands, and the entire region is estimated to have 3,500 vascular plant species. Several genera and one family are found only in this area of Mexico. Valuable plants include the tropical red cedar (Cedrela odorata) and bigleaf mahogany (Swietenia macrophylla). Palmita (Chamaedorea sp.) is an important source of revenue for the local people, with the ornamental leaves harvested carefully to avoid killing the plant. Types of vegetation cover include:

Type	Percent	Description
Cloud forest	5%	Dense vegetation in a humid, temperate climate, found only above 800 m. These may represent the largest area of undisturbed cloud forest in Mexico and Central America.
Pine forest	20%	Mostly pines, typically found in temperate and cooler areas.
Semi-deciduous tropical forest	6%	Trees are 4–15 m high, and more than 75% of the species lose their leaves during the dry season.
Tropical rain forest	56%	The canopy exceeds 30 m in height and more than 75% of the species preserve their leaves throughout the year.
Farmed	5%	Agriculture, livestock and forestry
Others	8%	

== Fauna ==
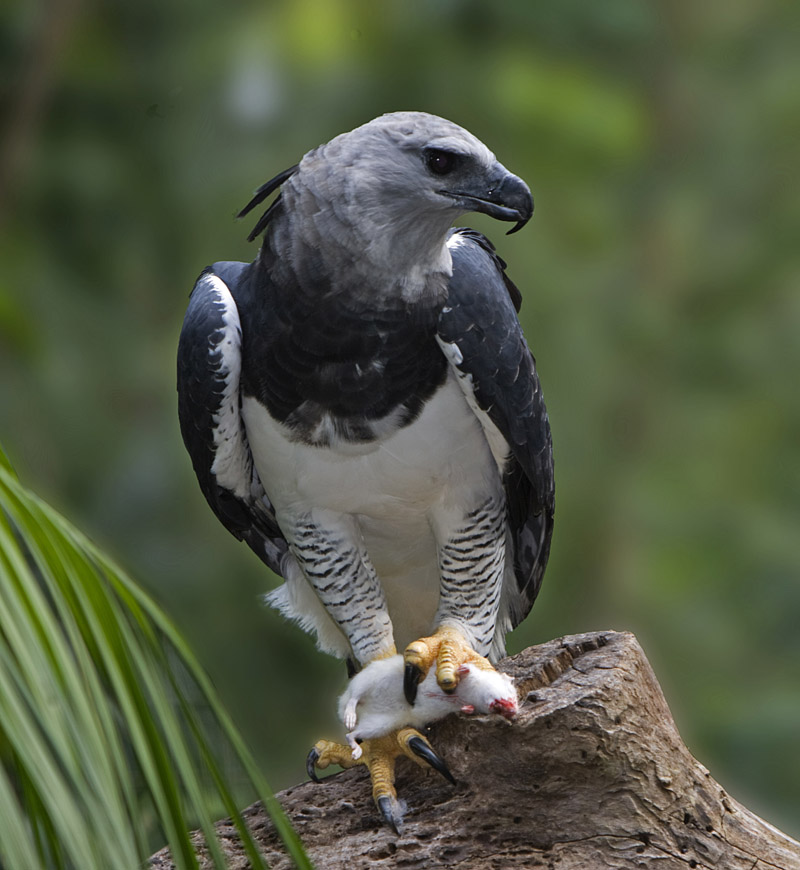
Harpy eagle

The forest forms a vital biological corridor between North and Central America and has very diverse zoology, lying at the conjunction between the Nearctic and Neotropical realms and spanning a range of montane and lowland habitats. It is home to species that include the ocelot, Baird's tapir, and puma. Highly threatened species include jaguar, Geoffroy's spider monkey, white-lipped peccary, horned guan, resplendent quetzal and harpy eagle. There are estimated to be more than 600 bird species, including great curassow, crested guan and ornate hawk-eagle. Recent herpetological studies have found many new forms, including at least eight endemic reptile and amphibian species.

== People ==
Before the Mexican colonial period, the area was inhabited by the Chima, a Zoque people believed to be descendants of the Olmec. With the arrival of the Spanish, the Uxpanapa colony to the north established settlements on the Corte River (English: Cut River), which is easily navigable, and began to exploit the forest. From 1731 to 1747, the region around Santa María Chimalapa was an important source of giant pines, used for masts and beams by the Spanish navy. The trees were floated down the Corte River, which owes its name to the cutting of these trees, to Coatzacoalcos and carried across to the Havana Shipyards.

Despite continued contacts with the colonialists and prospectors, in their relatively inaccessible terrain the Chimas in the forest region were largely undisturbed until the later half of the nineteenth century, when the government started selling off concessions to exploit their "vacant" lands for timber and grazing. The process slowed with the revolution of 1910, then picked up speed in the 1970s with fresh immigrants moving into the region, often assisted by the government.

In the early 1970s, the federal government launched a program in the Uxpanapa region to resettle small farmers displaced by the Cerro de Oro Dam, bulldozing and burning large areas of the forest to open it up for farming. Approximately 26,000 people, mostly Chinantec, were moved into the area. The planned large scale agricultural schemes failed, although small farmers were able to make a living. The displaced people were dissatisfied with the new conditions and protested, but did not achieve much. Several of their leaders were jailed. Migrants also settled in other parts of the Selva Zoque. Some of the new arrivals engaged in small scale farming and hunting, while others moved into more destructive activities such as ranching, illegal logging of valuable tree species and cultivation of narcotics.

In the core Chimalapas region there was a total population of about 18,000 in 1999. Two towns, Santa Maria Chimalapa and San Miguel Chimalapa had a combined population of 3,000. The remainder was split between 38 "recognized" settlements and 34 informal settlements along the river banks and in the valleys. Some of the informal settlements were created by official colonization schemes and others by invading peasants. The area is now ethnically diverse, with the Zoques reduced to a minority of perhaps 30%. The region is extremely poor, with limited infrastructure such as roads and schools.

== Development plans ==
The Mexican government has plans to develop the trans-isthmus corridor that borders the region to the west. This includes improving transportation routes across the isthmus between the Caribbean and the Pacific, developing an industrial zone along the highway and expanding the petroleum and petrochemical industries in Salina Cruz on the Pacific coast. Other plans include creating coffee plantations and cattle corridors, expanding production of beans, maize and chili and exploiting the bio-genetic resources of native medicinal plants. A plan first proposed in 1977 for a dam in the Chimalapas has been stalled due to environmental concerns. In June 2008 the State of Oaxaca was again proposing construction of a storage dam in the Rio El Corte Basin in the Chimalapa sub-region, with the potential to irrigate 100,000 hectares of the Isthmus of Tehuantepec and to supply water to the Salina Cruz Refinery.

To reduce impact of this nearby development on the Chimalapas the government has in the past made offers to buy forest land and turn it into a biosphere reserve, but these have been rejected by the native people who would lose their ancestral lands. The local government officials and their families are dedicated to sell tracks of virgin forest to create ranch operations and destroy the forest, and use the money to help the Zapatista warlords, they use their influences inside the state to legalize the plots of lands that they sold, this is evidenced in the new town called Arroyo Dos Arcos, deep into federally protected land. More recently, plans (at least in Oaxaca) have involved the communities affected and have emphasized sustainable use of the forest resources. This approach appears to have more promise.

== Environmental issues ==
The jaguar is one of the threatened species of the region

Environmental issues include destructive forestry, land clearance for grazing livestock and clearance for cultivation of illegal drugs. Rare animal species are at risk from illegal hunting, and valuable trees such as mahogany and cedar are extracted through illegal forestry. Construction of Federal roads may cause loss of continuity between the different forest areas. In the Uxpanapa area more than 80% of the original cover has been lost, and in the Ocote area 40%. Loss of original cover has been relatively low in Los Chimalapas area.

At the end of the dry season in early 1998 there were extensive forest fires in the region, affecting over 200,000 hectares. The season had been exceptionally dry, partly due to El Niño. When the rains came, flooding resulted and since then land productivity has fallen. Various theories were put forward to explain the fires, ranging from slash and burn clearing within the forest and deliberate burns to remove stubble from farmland that ran out of control to a plot by the government to create the fires from the air. Some pointed out that much of the burned land was in the area that would be covered by the proposed dam and highway. The implication that fires were set deliberately is based on the belief that there are powerful interests who would like to see the region exploited for its lumber and farmland potential, and to see the large hydropower potential put to work.

The forest has been designated "outstanding at a bioregional level" by the World Bank and the World Wide Fund for Nature (WWF), and has been recognized as a Global 200 ecoregion. The government has recognized the rights of the communities in Chimalapas to be involved in conservation planning. The Maderas rainforest conservancy has been active in the area, seeking to prevent further fires and encourage sustainable land use. The WWF has also been active in attempting to encourage conservation efforts in the Chimalapas area. The area of El Ocote is now protected, although with mixed results. Pronatura Chiapas and Pronatura Veracruz are also working on conservation projects in the area. The goal is to improve environmental protection while supporting sustainable use of the natural resources by the local population.

However, it is difficult to strike a balance between protecting this unique environment, respecting the rights of the traditional inhabitants and improving the economy to eliminate poverty, malnutrition and disease.

== See also ==
- Chimalapas territory conflict
