= El Corte River =

Coordinates: 16°56′20.10″N 94°46′18.63″W

Río El Corte
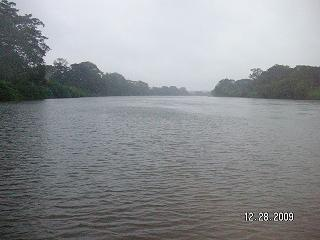

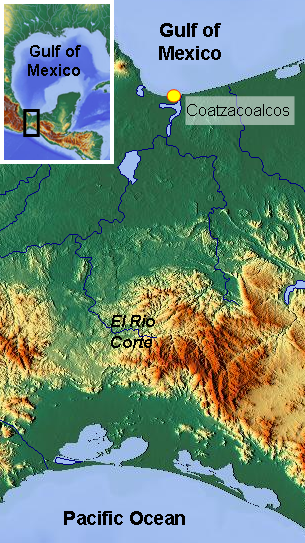
- Isthmus of Tehuantepec, Mexico showing El Rio Corte

Location
- Country: Mexico

El Corte River (in Spanish Río El Corte, meaning "The Cut River") is the primary tributary of the Coatzacoalcos River, flowing through the Mexican states of Oaxaca and Veracruz to the Gulf of Mexico.

== Geography ==
The river originates in the mountains to the east of the Isthmus of Tehuantepec, a lowland corridor between the Gulf of Mexico and the Pacific Ocean. In its upper reaches it flows westward through the Zoque Forest (Selva Zoque), an ecologically important zone with high biological diversity, part of the Mesoamerican Biological Corridor. It is home to cichlids among many other species of fish. The river provides water to the township of Santa María Chimalapa and to Cuauhtémoc, the most important arable and livestock region of the state of Oaxaca. Running north through the Isthmus, the river joins the Coatzacoalcos River which trends in a roughly northeast direction to the gulf.

== Development ==
During the Mexican colonial period, the Uxpanapa colony to the north established settlements on the river, which is easily navigable, and began to exploit the forest. From 1731 to 1747, the forests around Santa María Chimalapa were an important source of giant pines, used for masts and beams by the Spanish Navy. The trees were floated down El Corte (which owes its name to the cutting of these trees) to Coatzacoalcos, and from there were taken to the shipyards of Havana.

The Zoque Forest today is under pressure from forestry and forest fires, human population growth, agrarian conflict, cattle production, subsistence hunting and illegal trafficking of threatened species, development and infrastructure projects and narco-trafficking. The World Wide Fund for Nature, with financial assistance from USAID is developing Watershed Management Plans for El Corte (Santa Maria Chimalapa) and Espíritu Santo (San Miguel Chimalapa) rivers to alleviate these threats.

Projects under the Puebla-Panama Plan, such as an industrial corridor to the west of the Zoque forest around the trans-isthmus highway, and rural industrialization through tree and coffee plantations and cattle corridors, may threaten the river's ecology. In June 2008 the State of Oaxaca was considering construction of a storage dam in the Río El Corte Basin in the Chimalapa sub-region, with the potential to irrigate 100,000 hectares of the Isthmus of Tehuantepec and to supply water to the Salina Cruz Refinery.
