= Sierra Atravesada =

Mountain range in Oaxaca, Mexico

The Sierra Atravesada or Sierra de Niltepec is a mountain range in the state of Oaxaca, Mexico, in the region of the Isthmus of Tehuantepec.

== Geography ==
The range forms, with the Sierra de Tres Picos range, the northwestern foothills of the Sierra Madre de Chiapas that straddle the states of Oaxaca and Chiapas. The range runs east−west.

The Sierra Atravesada consist mostly of metamorphic and granite rocks, and forms the most important division of the Isthmus of Tehuantepec.

=== Peaks ===
The main peaks of the Sierra Atravesada are:

- Cerro Azul — 2,250 metres (7,380 ft)
- Cerro Baul — 2,050 metres (6,730 ft).

== Watersheds ==
On its eastern slope waters flow into the Rio Uxpanapa system, which flows into the Gulf of Mexico, while the main collector of its western slope is the Rio Chimalapa, which flows into the Pacific Ocean.

The Rio Negro, a tributary of the Grijalva, rises on the eastern slope of this mountain range. Other rivers of importance that have their origins in the Sierra Atravesada are the rivers Salado, Chivela, Chichigua and the Sarabia, all of which are tributaries of the Coatzacoalcos, one of the largest rivers in Mexico.

Rain in this area is very abundant, being in the path of humid winds blowing south from the Gulf of Mexico. Rainfall varies between 2,800 and 4,000 mm/year, depending on the slope. The relatively high temperatures (with an annual average of 25 °C) and the high amount of sunshine make the entire region a good example of a tropical rainforest.
