= Mary E. Tusch =

American aeronautical collector

Mary E. "Mother" Tusch
- Born: December 26, 1874 or 1875
- Died: 1960; Washington, DC
- Burial place: Sunset View Cemetery, Contra Costa County, California
- Years active: 1915–1950
- Known for: Aeronautical artifact collection
- Spouse: Cary Tusch
- Children: Irene Garber

Mary E. "Mother" Tusch (born 1874 or 1875; died 1960) was a woman known as the "Mother of Aviators" due to her hosting hundreds of future pilots at her bungalow in Berkeley, California.

== Berkeley residence ==
Tusch resided in a cottage across the street from the United States School of Military Aeronautics at the University of California, Berkeley that was dubbed "The Hangar," the "Chapel of Aviation," and the "Shrine of the Air." She welcomed cadets from the school into her home, offering them hospitality and refreshments, and served as a mother figure to them, resulting in them referring to her as "Mother." She was known for bidding farewell to the students who visited her, whom she referred to as her "boys," by telling them, "God bless you."

== Aeronautical artifact collection ==
Tusch maintained a register of visitors to her home, as well as a birthday book on which she recorded the birthdays of visitors. Visitors would also sign her wallpaper, including signatures from Charles Lindbergh and Eddie Rickenbacker.

The students who visited her would go on to flight school and then to the various theatres of World War I and World War II, and would send her back aeronautical memorabilia, which collected in her cottage. Some examples of objects in her collection include what was claimed to be a piece of the wreckage of the Hindenburg, a propeller from the first flight between San Francisco and Oakland, a cloth cap worn by Richard E. Byrd, a protective helmet worn by Henry H. Arnold, a gasoline cap, fabric, a spare hose, and a drain plug. She also maintained correspondence with many of these former cadets.

Her collection also includes both formal and informal photographs and images signed by famous aviators, including Ruth Law and Earle Ovington.

== Later life and death ==
In 1950 her health deteriorated and she moved to Washington, DC to live with her daughter, Irene. Irene's husband Paul Garber was the curator of the Smithsonian's National Air Museum, the precursor to the National Air and Space Museum.

When she died, she donated her memorabilia, including autographed wallpaper from her home, to the museum. Parts of the collection were put on display shortly after her death.

== Preservation of Berkeley house ==
In 1947, when a plan to expand the University of California's campus threatened to raze her house, former cadets campaigned to preserve it.

== Honors ==
Mother Tusch was an honorary member of the Women Flyers of America, the Veterans of Foreign Wars, the National Aeronautic Association, the Exchange Club, and the National League of American Penwomen.
