= Paul Garber =

American primatologist

Paul Alan Garber

Academic background
- Education: Washington University in St. Louis
- Thesis: Locomotor behavior and feeding ecology of the panamanian tamarin (Saguinus oedipus geoffroyi, callitrichidae, primates) (1980)

Academic work
- Discipline: Primatology
- Institutions: University of Illinois at Urbana–Champaign

Paul Garber is a primatologist and the author and editor of several books and articles about primates. He is a professor at the University of Illinois. He is editor of the American Journal of Primatology and director of research and education at La Suerte Biological Field School in Costa Rica. Books he has authored or edited include New Perspectives in the Study of Mesoamerican Primates: Distribution, Ecology, Behavior, and Conservation (Developments in Primatology: Progress and Prospects), On the Move: How and Why Animals Travel in Groups, Adaptive Radiations of Neotropical Primates. and South American Primates: Comparative Perspectives in the Study of Behavior, Ecology, and Conservation (Developments in Primatology: Progress and Prospects) In 2014, he co-edited two books on howler monkeys. He has also studied interrelationships between the moustached tamarin and the saddleback tamarin.

Professor Garber received his Ph.D. in Anthropology from Washington University in St. Louis in 1980.
