= El Barrio de La Soledad =

- Municipality and town
- Location in Mexico
- Coordinates: 16°48′N 95°07′W
- Country: Mexico
- State: Oaxaca

Area
  - Total: 233.48 km^{2} (90.15 sq mi)
- Elevation: 240 m (790 ft)

Population (2005)
  - Total: 14,439
- Time zone: UTC-6 (Central Standard Time)

El Barrio de La Soledad is a town and municipality in Oaxaca in southeastern Mexico. The municipality covers an area of 233.48 km^{2}. It is part of the Juchitán District in the west of the Istmo de Tehuantepec region

As of 2005, the municipality had a total population of 13,439.
