= Santa María Petapa =

Santa María Petapa "guigo daa" or "guego daa" (Zapoteca); "petlal" "pan" (Nahuatl).
- Municipality and town
- Location in Mexico
- Coordinates: 16°49′N 95°7′W
- Country: Mexico
- State: Oaxaca

Area
  - Total: 145.44 km^{2} (56.15 sq mi)
- Elevation: 260 m (850 ft)

Population (2005)
  - Total: 15,387
- Time zone: UTC-6 (Central Standard Time)

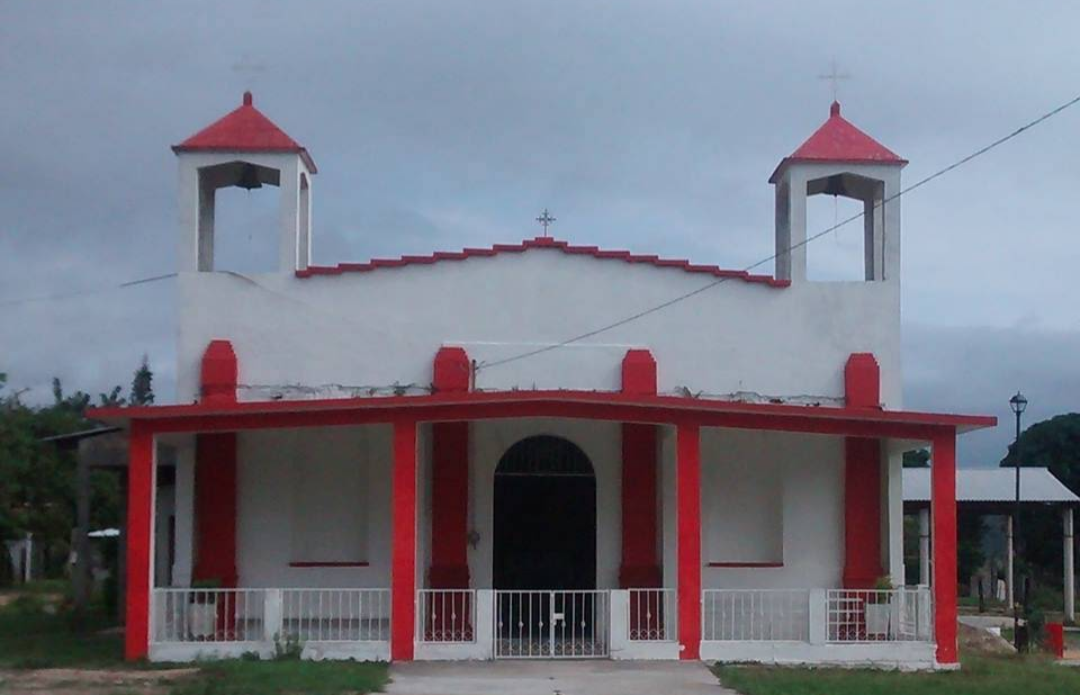
Church of Santa María Petapa

Santa María Petapa is a town and municipality in Oaxaca in south-western Mexico. It is part of the Juchitán District in the west of the Istmo de Tehuantepec region.

== Name ==
The name comes from the Zapotec language words meaning "four winds". The town was given this name in 1525.

After Espiritu Santu (now Coatzacoalcos) it is the oldest Spanish town in the Isthmus of Tehuantepec. Guigo or guego and petlatl means "river" and daa or petlatl means petate. It is original name of Petapa.

== Geography ==
The town is located on a plain, bounded to the north and west by high mountains. It is at an elevation of 260 meters above sea level. The municipality covers an area of 145.44 km^{2}. The land is irrigated by the Petapa River. The climate is warm and humid, with abundant rainfall in the spring, summer and autumn.

=== Flora and fauna ===
The forests contain oak, mahogany, cedar, guaiac, rosewood, spring, Nopo, mamey, avocado, pine and cedar. Wild fauna include Toucan, boar, deer, tepeizcuinte, coyote, raccoon, armadillo and skunk.

== Demographics ==
The church of Our Lady of the Assumption was built in the sixteenth century. An 1852 description said the town had once contained a population of 5,000 but had by that time been reduced to 1,300.

As of 2005, the municipality had 3,476 households with a total population of 13,867 of which 3,294 spoke an indigenous language.

== Economy ==
The main economic activity is agriculture, with crops of corn, beans, coffee and vegetables. Animal husbandry is also important, including cattle, pigs, goats, sheep, horses and poultry. Logging is also practiced, with fine wood marketed for furniture manufacturing.
