= Jaltepec River =

Location
- Country: Mexico

The Jaltepec River is a river in Mexico. It is a tributary of the Coatzacoalcos River.

== See also ==
- List of rivers of Mexico
