= San Pedro Tapanatepec =

- Municipality and town
- Location in Mexico
- Coordinates: 16°22′N 94°12′W
- Country: Mexico
- State: Oaxaca
- District: Juchitán District

Area
  - Total: 544.78 km^{2} (210.34 sq mi)
- Elevation: 40 m (130 ft)
- Time zone: UTC-6 (Central Standard Time)

San Pedro Tapanatepec is a town and municipality in Oaxaca in southeastern Mexico. It is part of the Juchitán District in the west of the Istmo de Tehuantepec region.

== History ==
The town was founded on 23 April 1669, and became a municipality on March 15, 1825. The name means "broken hill". Before the arrival of the Spanish, the town was inhabited by Zoque people, and may have been part of the Xoconochco province of the Zapotec kingdom of Tehuantepec.

== Geography ==
The municipality covers an area of 544.78 km^{2}. The town is at an elevation of 40 meters above sea level. There is one river, the Novillero, which rises at El Potrerito in the Sierra Madre. The climate is warm, sub-humid with summer rains. Flora include mesquite, mango, sapodilla, lemon, tepezcohuite, pochote, low scrub and grassland. Wild fauna include wild boar, rabbit, coyote, deer, armadillo and iguana.

== Population ==
As of 2005, the municipality had a total population of 13,647 of whom 609 spoke an indigenous language.

== Economy ==
Economic activity included growing corn, sorghum, sesame, watermelon, melon, mango and lemon, and raising cattle, goats, sheep, horses and poultry. Dairy farming is important in the community. The town also has facilities for canning fruit.
