= Ometepe Biological Field School =

Coordinates: 11.4162999°N 85.5398165°W

The Ometepe Biological Field School, located in San Ramón, Ometepe Island, Nicaragua, is one of two field school operated by the Maderas Rainforest Conservancy (the other being La Suerte Biological Field School). It houses courses in primatology, ecology, botany, and other courses related to the flora and fauna of Ometepe, Nicaragua. It was established in 1997.

== Location ==
The location is Isla de Ometepe. Ometepe is an island of 276 square kilometers lying in Lake Nicaragua. It is one of the largest islands in the world situated in a freshwater lake. Two forested volcanoes dominate the island. One called Maderas raises 1,400 meters above the lake. The other, Concepción reaches a height of nearly 1,700 meters. Ometepe is situated in southeastern Nicaragua and has a population of 30,000 people. The majority of the people who live on the island are of Indian ancestry.

== Field research and schools ==
The site is where the Maderas Rainforest Conservancy houses many of its conservation initiatives. These include: a veterinary field mission, a children's workshop for the local children of Ometepe to learn about conservation, a primate corridor project to combat deforestation in the area, and an educational facility to build conservation professionals. This education facility is the field school which offers courses to university students from around the world.

=== Primate Field School ===
The conservancy runs a primate field school at Ometepe which has such courses as "Primate Behavior and Ecology", "Advanced Primate Behavior and Ecology", "Primate Conservation", and "Primate Communication". The courses center on the two native primate species of the area: white-faced capuchin monkeys (Cebus capucinus) and Mantled Black Howler Monkeys (Alouatta palliata). Daily lectures cover a variety of subjects in primatology. Students are divided into small groups to learn skills important to primate field research. Using the forests of Ometepe as classrooms, students learn how to map a trail system; how to conduct vegetation sampling and analysis; methods of assessing food availability; and observation techniques to study the social, feeding, and ranging behavior of primates.

==== Independent Research Projects ====
After completing the field methods section of the class, students begin work on their own projects. Faculty members work closely with students as they undertake this portion of the course. First, each student develops a research proposal detailing the subject to be investigated and the methods to be used. Each student presents his or her proposal to the class. Next, each student must collect data for his or her project; data analysis follows. Finally, students write a final paper on their project and make an oral presentation to the class.

=== Ecology Field School ===
Ecology is also offered at the field school. This course offers an opportunity to study the unique elfin forest in Nicaragua. This forest is part of the famous cloud forests, which are habitats that are globally endangered. These mountain forests are inherently cool and rainy, representing unique ‘sky islands’ with a high proportion of endemic species, many not even described to science, yet. The course objectives are to document and quantitatively inventory, for the first time, the existing biodiversity of this habitat located at approximately 1000 meters in altitude. The Maderas volcano offers a unique altitudinal gradient and mountain top to assess this tropical mountain wilderness, but also human impacts including climate change and invasive species. This course teaches expedition skills, and makes use of the nearby Ometepe field station as the base.

=== Botany Field School ===
Tropical Ethnobotany is offered at this location. The course covers primarily the medicinal plants of the area, although plants from other areas such as the Amazon will also be discussed. The course will include: Identification of some of the commonly used medicinal plants, methods of preparation, including teas, decoctions, tinctures and salves, medical conditions and diseases for which the various plants are used, and the chemical structure and mode of action of selected medicinal plants. It is also designed to give students hands-on experience in the search for medicinal plants in the Neotropics.

=== Other courses ===
Other courses at the field school include Comparative Anatomy and Function, Tropical Herpetology, and Photography.
