= Peperomia xalana =

Scientific classification
- Kingdom: Plantae
- Clade: Embryophytes
- Clade: Tracheophytes
- Clade: Angiosperms
- Clade: Magnoliids
- Order: Piperales
- Family: Piperaceae
- Genus: Peperomia
- Species: P. xalana

Binomial name
- Peperomia xalana G.Mathieu

Species of plant

Peperomia xalana is a species of plant from the genus Peperomia. It was discovered in Veracruz, Mexico by Guido Mathieu in 1982. In Uxpanapa, Peperomia xalana has an elevation range of 120 m.
