= Santo Domingo Zanatepec =

- Municipality and town
- Location in Mexico
- Coordinates: 16°28′N 94°21′W
- Country: Mexico
- State: Oaxaca

Area
  - Total: 1,024.49 km^{2} (395.56 sq mi)
- Elevation: 60 m (200 ft)

Population (2005)
  - Total: 10,716
- Time zone: UTC-6 (Central Standard Time)

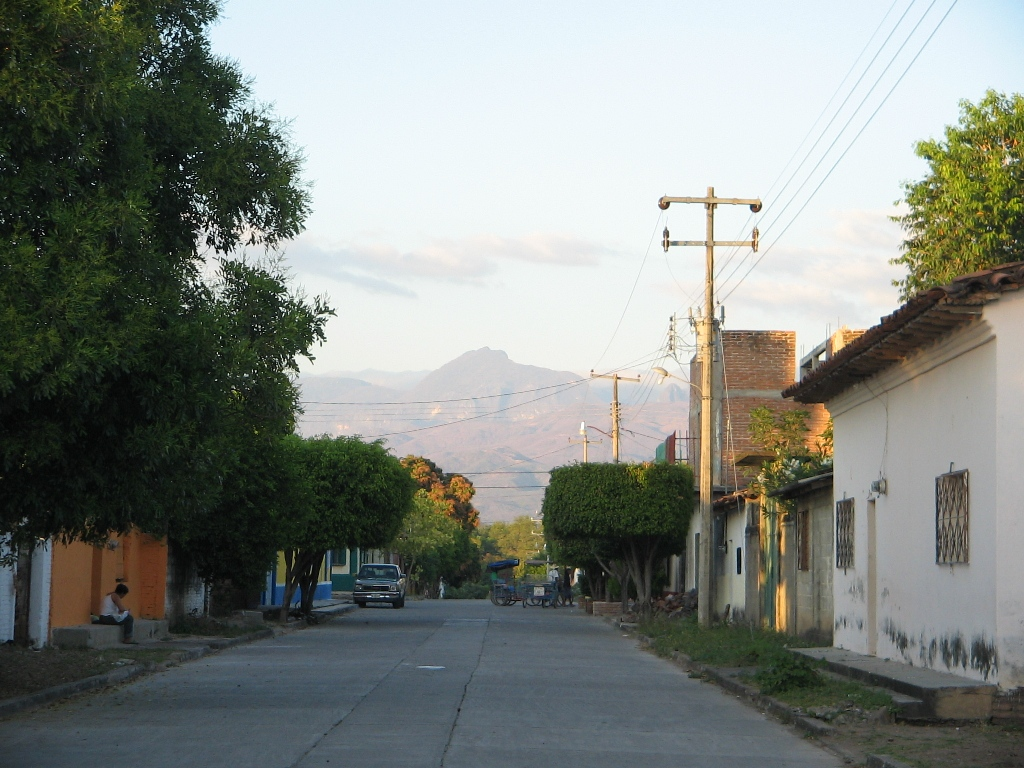
Street in Santo Domingo Zanatepec

Santo Domingo Zanatepec is a town and municipality in Oaxaca in south-western Mexico. It is part of the Juchitán District in the west of the Istmo de Tehuantepec region.

== Geography ==
The municipality, established on 15 March 1825 covers an area of 1024.49 km^{2}. The climate is warm and humid with rain in summer and autumn, averaging 1,220 mm annually. The municipality is mainly grassland, with areas of wood. Wildlife include hare, rabbit, gray fox, coyote, deer, iguana, armadillo and wild birds such as doves, quail and rook.

== Demography ==
As of 2005, the municipality had 2,727 households with a total population of 10,716 of whom 211 spoke an indigenous language.

== Economy ==
The main economic activity is cultivation of maize, sorghum, sesame, vegetables and fruit (mango and tamarind). Some families breed cattle, pigs and goats. There are archaeological sites in the city of Santo Domingo and in Coyotera Regadillo. The church of Santo Domingo dates to the sixteenth century.
