= La Suerte Biological Field School =

Costan Rican rainforest educational institution

Coordinates: 10.4486409°N 83.7822814°W

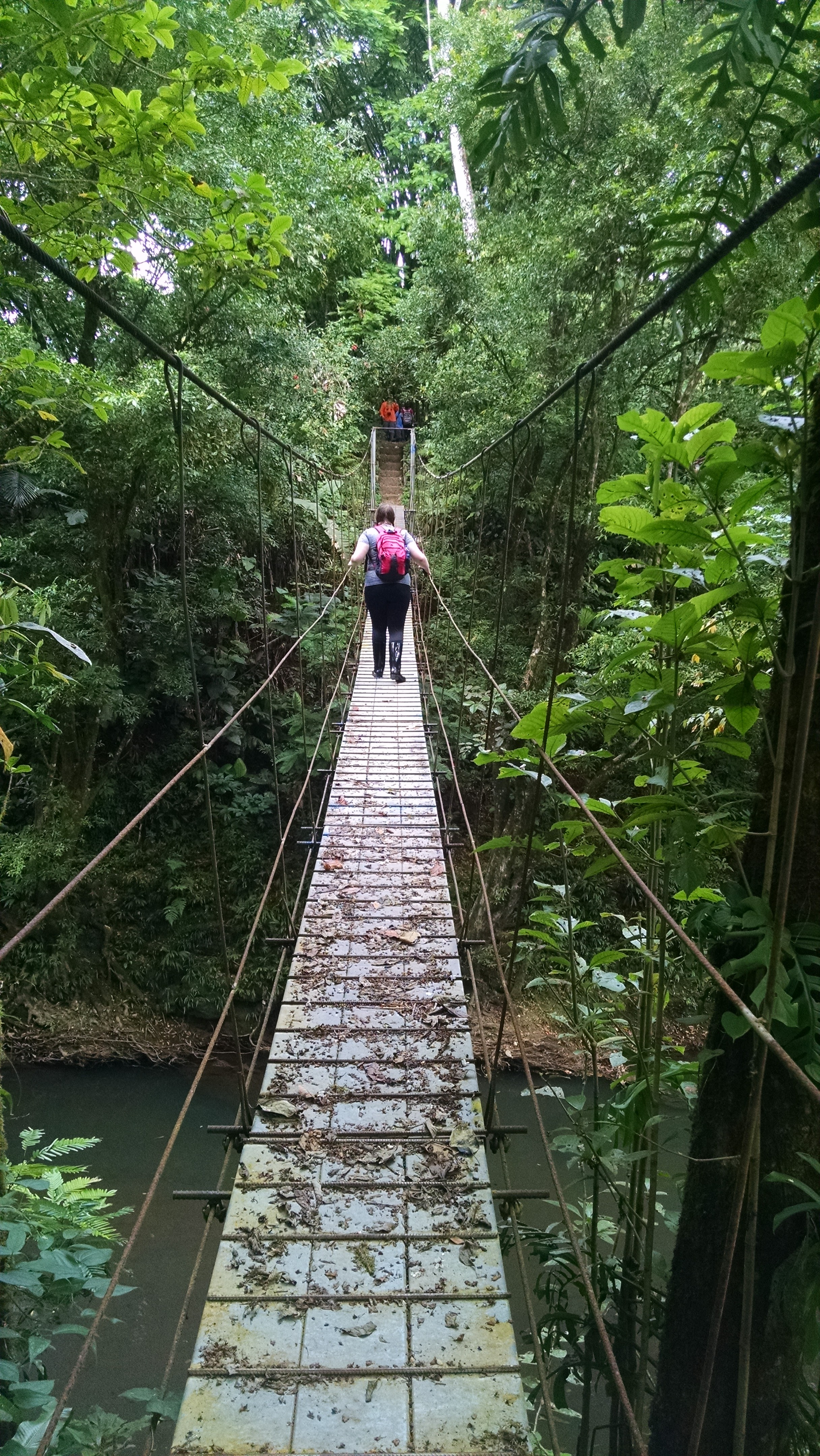
Swinging bridge over the Rio La Suerte

La Suerte Biological Field School, located in Northeastern Costa Rica, is one of two field schools operated by the Maderas Rainforest Conservancy (the other being the Ometepe Biological Field School in Nicaragua). The site is situated in a tropical rainforest basin. It houses courses in primatology, ecology, botany, and other courses related to the flora and fauna of Northeastern Costa Rica.

== Location ==
This lowland Neotropical region remains one of the most biologically diverse in the world. The list of animals include three monkey species (white-face capuchins, mantled howlers and spiders), pacas and agoutis, keel-billed toucans, white-crowned parrots, strawberry poison-dart frogs, eyelash vipers and green iguanas.

The Research Station and surrounding forests and farm were purchased by the Molina family in 1987. The field station encompasses 700 acres (2.8 km^{2}) containing a wealth of habitats including primary and secondary forests, swamps, marshes and pasture. In addition, much of the property lies along the Rio La Suerte, a flowing river that empties into the Caribbean at Tortuguero National Park

== Field School ==
Since it was established in 1993, La Suerte has attracted over 550 students from across the United States, Canada, Latin America, India and Japan to study tropical rainforest ecology and conservation.

The Field School offers broad undergraduate and graduate training in Neotropical field ecology. Classes are limited to around 22 students. With one senior faculty and three graduate teaching assistants per course, the small class size insures an optimal student to faculty ratio of 1 to 5. Courses include primate ecology and behavior, rainforest ecology, ornithology and herpetology. Designed to be "classrooms in nature", these hands-on courses get students into the field, designing and conducting individualized research projects. In previous years, students at La Suerte have chosen to study a wide range of topics such as positional and feeding behavior of capuchin monkeys, plant diversity between artificial and natural forest gaps, inter- and intrasexual territoriality in northern jacanas, effects of ultraviolet radiation on leaf-breeding frog eggs, activity patterns and diet in giant bala ants, and attitudes in the local community toward conservation. Additionally, several long-term research projects are on-going at La Suerte that include primate behavior, poison-dart frog territoriality, ant distribution and abundance, and bird-mediated plant succession in pastures.

=== Primate Field School ===
The conservancy runs a primate field school at La Suerte which has such courses as "Primate Behavior and Ecology", "Advanced Primate Behavior and Ecology", and "Primate Conservation". The courses center on the two native primate species of the area: white-faced capuchin monkeys (Cebus capucinus) and Mantled Black Howler Monkeys (Alouatta palliata). Daily lectures cover a variety of subjects in primatology. Students are divided into small groups to learn skills important to primate field research. Using the tropical rainforest of La Suerte as classrooms, students learn how to map a trail system; how to conduct vegetation sampling and analysis; methods of assessing food availability; and observation techniques to study the social, feeding, and ranging behavior of primates.

==== Independent Research Projects ====
After completing the field methods section of the class, students begin work on their own projects. Faculty members work closely with students as they undertake this portion of the course. First, each student develops a research proposal detailing the subject to be investigated and the methods to be used. Each student presents his or her proposal to the class. Next, each student must collect data for his or her project; data analysis follows. Finally, students write a final paper on their project and make an oral presentation to the class.

=== Ecology Field School ===
Ecology is also offered at the field school. This offering is an intensive, nine-day field course. Through a total immersion in the tropical ecosystems we will be exploring, students will learn both the principles and practice of ecology. Students examine the biological and ecological processes that have developed and maintain the biodiversity of the tropical terrestrial biota. Students discuss issues of conservation, sustainable development and resource use, and the human impact on these fragile ecosystems. This course involves extensive field work and completion of field projects.

=== Neotropical Natural History Field School ===
Neotropical Natural History is a field course in the basic principles and methodologies of natural history studies in a tropical environment. Topics include climates and ecosystems, rainforest structure and diversity, evolutionary patterns, coevolutionary complexities and the ecology of fruit, the neotropical pharmacy, land use in the neotropics, savannas and dry forests, mangroves and coral reefs, and deforestation and conservation of biodiversity. Field and lab activities focus on amphibians, reptiles, birds, and mammals. Students study the taxonomy and ecology of each of these faunal groups and develop skills in locating, observing, handling, and field identification of common neotropical species.

=== Other courses ===
Other courses at the field school include Comparative Anatomy and Function, Tropical Herpetology, and Photography.
