= Chinantla (municipality) =

- Municipality
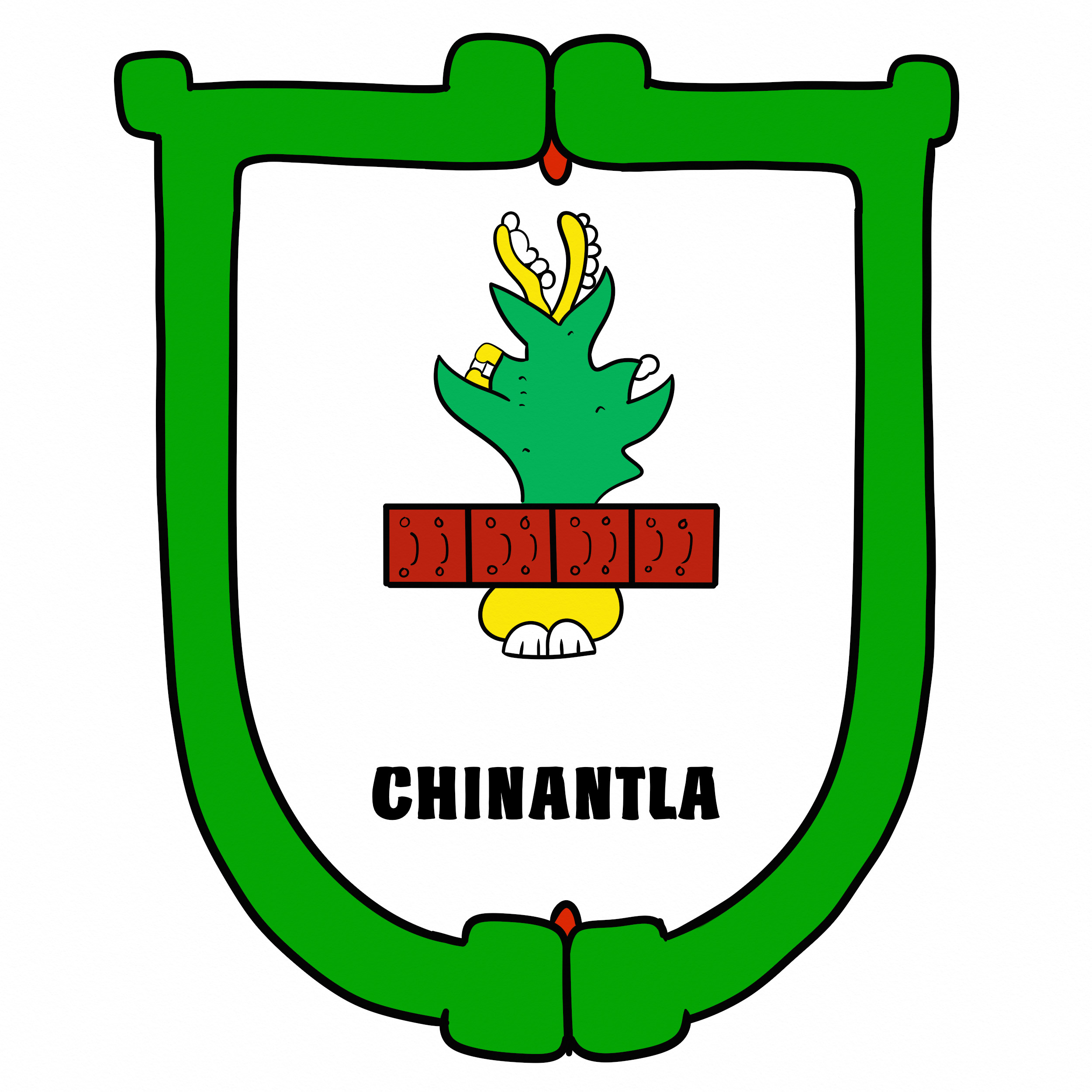
- Coat of arms

- Location of the municipality in Puebla
- Coordinates: 18.202°N 98.262°W
- Country: Mexico
- State: Puebla
- Municipal seat: Chinantla, Puebla

Population (2010)
  - Total: 2,468
- Time zone: UTC-6 (Zona Centro)
- Website: ayuntamientodechinantla.gob.mx

Chinantla is a municipality in the Mexican state of Puebla. The municipal seat is the town of Chinantla, Puebla.

According to INEGI figures the municipality had a 2010 population of 2,468 inhabitants.
