= Coatzacoalcos River =

River in Veracruz, Mexico

Coatzacoalcos
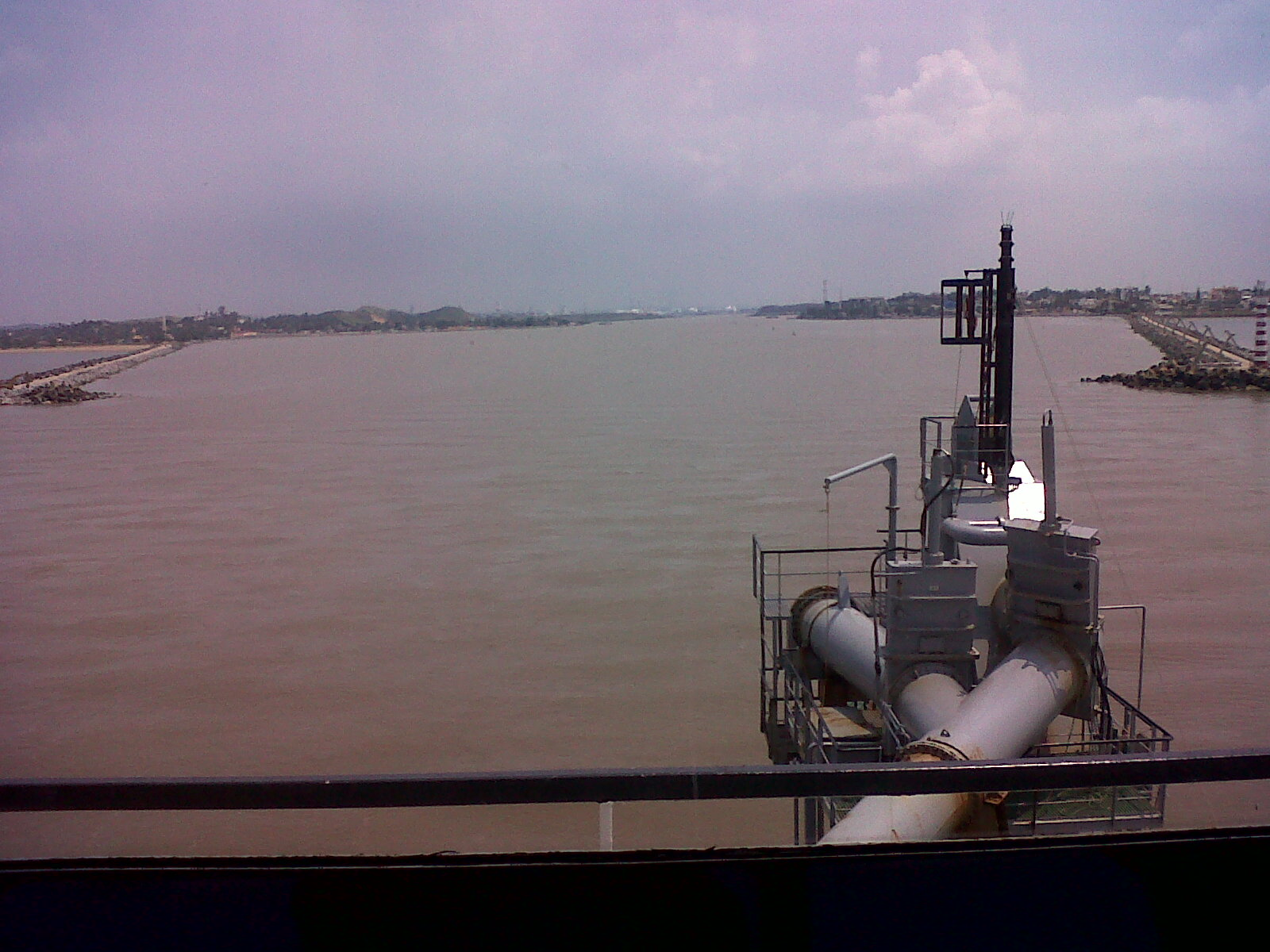
- Approaching the mouth of the river from the Gulf of Mexico. The city of Coatzacoalcos is to starboard, and Allende to port. (2011)

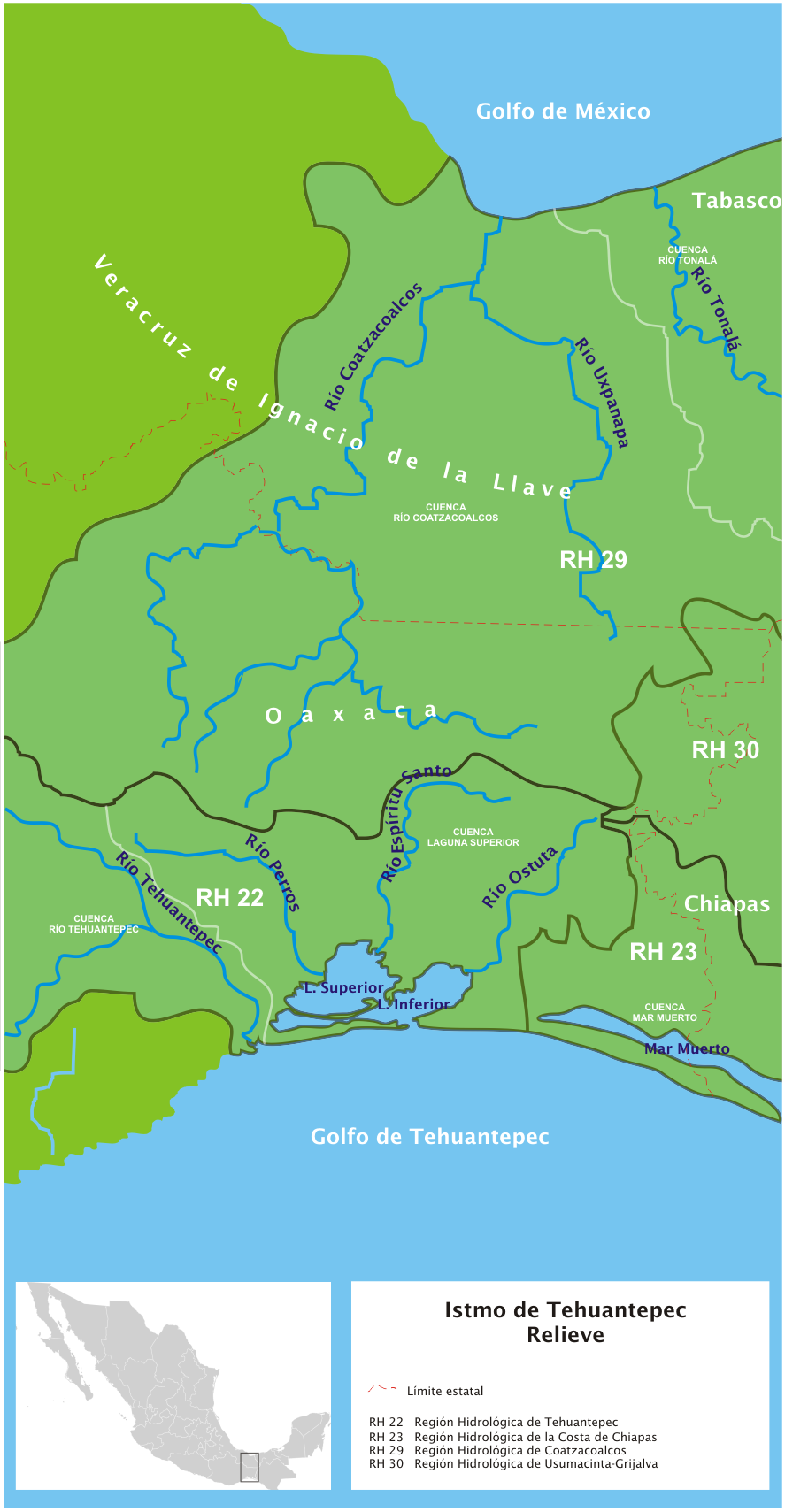

- Location of mouth
- Etymology: "where serpent hides" (Nahuatl)

Location
- Country: Mexico
- State: Oaxaca, Veracruz
- Region: Isthmus of Tehuantepec
- Cities: Matías Romero, Minatitlán, Nanchital, Coatzacoalcos

Physical characteristics
- Source
  - coordinates: 16°56′44″N 94°37′1″W
- Mouth
  - coordinates: 18°9′56″N 94°24′50″W
  - elevation: 0 m (0 ft)
- Length: 325 km (202 mi)
- Basin size: 17,563 km^{2} (6,781 sq mi)
- Discharge
  - average: 1,163 m^{3}/s (41,100 cu ft/s)

Basin features
- Tributaries
  - left: Sarabia, Jaltepec
  - right: El Corte, Uxpanapa

The Coatzacoalcos is a large river that feeds mainly the south part of the state of Veracruz; it originates in the Sierra de Niltepec and crosses the state of Oaxaca in the region of the Isthmus of Tehuantepec, flowing for 325 kilometres (202 miles) toward the Gulf of Mexico. Tributaries include El Corte, Sarabia, Jaltepec, Chalchijalpa, El Chiquito, Uxpanapa, and Calzadas. The merging of all these rivers creates one of the largest current flows in the entire region. Two-thirds of the streams are navigable.

Juan de Grijalva's 1518 expedition encountered the river. Hernán Cortés sent Diego de Ordaz to explore the river as a possible port.

== History ==
The Coatzacoalcos River is one of the most important rivers in Mexico. The oldest map of this river was drawn by Francisco Gali in 1580. Unlike most maps made in New Spain in the last quarter of the sixteenth century, this map is purely European in style and is somewhat reminiscent of a nautical chart. Analysis of the map suggests that it was made hastily. Both the errors in the distances and the numerous corrections that can still be observed support this conjecture. It seems that Francisco Gali was more interested from his point of view as an explorer and navigator in the most important aspect of the region: the possibility of connecting the North Sea and the South Sea through the Strait of Tehuantepec. In this respect, the map of Coatzacoalcos would have been drawn to show the viability of using the river as an interoceanic passage.

== Legend ==
According to legend, the Mesoamerican god Quetzalcoatl was aboard a raft made of a serpent skin and navigated until getting lost into the horizon. Ever since, the river has been known as Coatzacoalcos, which means "the place where the serpent hides" in Nahuatl.

== Port ==
The city of Coatzacoalcos, at the river's mouth, is one of the most commercial and industrialized ports, considered the third most important in the Gulf of Mexico, offering one of the most important means of transportation for an international commerce whose products are important to the local industrial farming business, forestry, and commerce in general for the Isthmus of Tehuantepec.

== Pollution ==
The Coatzacoalcos is also among the world's most contaminated rivers, partly because of the lack of environmental laws protecting the public water. According to the Mexican Center of Environmental Law (CEMDA) the biggest polluting body is the petrochemical industry of Mexico Pemex.

== See also ==
- CG Railway
- List of longest rivers of Mexico
- List of most-polluted rivers
- Selva Zoque
