= Santiago Niltepec =

- municipality and town
- Location in Mexico
- Coordinates: 16°34′N 94°37′W
- Country: Mexico
- State: Oaxaca

Area
  - Total: 680.01 km^{2} (262.55 sq mi)
- Elevation: 60 m (200 ft)

Population (2005)
  - Total: 4,961
- Time zone: UTC-6 (Central Standard Time)

Santiago Niltepec is a town and municipality in Oaxaca in southwestern Mexico. It is part of Juchitán District in the west of the Istmo de Tehuantepec region. The name means "Hill of Indigo."

== Geography ==
The town is 60 meters above sea level. The municipality covers an area of 680.01 km^{2}, watered by the Niltepec river which rises in the mountains and flows to the lower lagoon. The climate is tropical, with hot summers.

=== Flora and fauna ===
Flora includes mahogany, Nopo, Guanacaste, scrub and grassland. Wildlife includes wild boar, raccoon, squirrel, armadillo and iguana.

== Demography ==
As of 2005, the municipality had 1,367 households with a total population of 4,961 of whom 56 spoke an indigenous language. Economic activities include cultivation of corn, sesame, sorghum, melon and watermelon, cattle farming and production of Mezcal and traditional textiles. Since the town is located on Highway 190, there is some tourist trade in local handicrafts and mezcal. There are plans to develop wind farms in the municipality, but these have met local resistance due to the communal ownership of land and concerns about the annual rental prices offered, $98 to $117 per hectare.
