= Chinantla, Puebla =

Chinantla
- town
- Interactive map of Chinantla
- Coordinates: 18.202°N 98.262°W
- Country: Mexico
- State: Puebla

Population (2000)
  - Total: 2,810
- Website: ayuntamientodechinantla.gob.mx

Chinantla is a town in the Mexican state of Puebla. It serves as the municipal seat for the municipality of the same name. It is situated in the southeastern part of the state, and lies some 220 km (136.7mi) from the city of Puebla, the state capital.
