= La Chinantla =

Town in Uxpanapa, Veracruz, Mexico

Coordinates: 17.277°N 94.451°W

La Chinantla (Poblado 10) is a town in the municipality of Uxpanapa, in southwest Veracruz, Mexico.

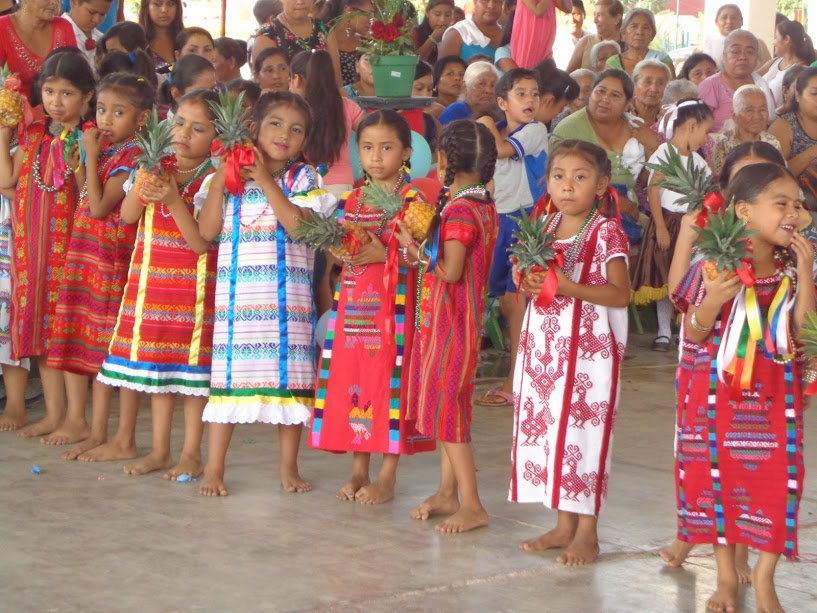
Pineapple folk dance in La Chinantla, 2015

The town was founded in 1977 as a resettlement town for indigenous people displaced by the construction of the Malpaso Dam in Chiapas. The town was planned, drafted, founded, and built by the Mexican military and Instituto Nacional Indigenista, now Comisión Nacional para el Desarrollo de los Pueblos Indígenas.

The town was founded in the middle of the jungle; it has a single dirt road leading in and out. Because it was built by the Mexican government, it has many amenities that other towns do not have, such as paved roads, concrete sidewalks, schools, a community center, electricity and potable water.

Every town in the region was assigned a number from 1 to 15; La Chinantla was assigned number 10 and therefore had originally been known as Poblado 10. The town changed its official name in 1997 when the municipality of Uxpanapa was authorized by the state legislature. The town is now called "La Chinantla" in honor of the Chinantec indigenous people that live in the region.

The town has Internet and phone service. The telephone area code (clave lada) is 923, and the postal code is 96998.
