= Maderas Rainforest Conservancy =

Nonprofit organization

The Maderas Rainforest Conservancy is a nonprofit organization which was established to promote the conservation, protection, and management of Mesoamerican forests and animal and plant biodiversity through education, reforestation, preservation, and by working with local communities, and national and international institutions and universities.

Increases in real estate sales, irresponsible tourism, live animal capture for the pet trade, and agricultural deforestation have left the species and ecosystems of Mesoamerican forests extremely vulnerable. The Maderas Rainforest Conservancy exists to combat these growing concerns.

The Maderas Rainforest Conservancy grew out of two field school locations offering classes in rainforest ecology, primatology, art workshops, and other classes relevant to the area: Ometepe, Nicaragua and La Suerte, Costa Rica. Rampant deforestation of these areas prompted the creation of a nonprofit organization geared to protecting and reforesting these areas.

== Mission ==
The Maderas Rainforest Conservancy states its mission to be threefold: According to the conservancy, first and foremost, the mission is to protect the ecosystems of Mesoamerican forests by purchasing and managing forested and deforested lands in strategic locations, initially in Costa Rica and Nicaragua. Deforested lands will be tactically replanted. Forested lands will be protected from clearing. Animals in these areas will be protected from capture and hunting. Secondly, the conservancy runs field schools in two locations (one in Nicaragua, the other in Costa Rica) where undergraduate and graduate students can take classes based on the ecosystems of these areas. These classes (including primatology, rainforest ecology, and art in the rainforest) give students the opportunity to explore Mesoamerican forests and gain a first hand understanding of the ecology therein. It is the hope that these students turn this education into increased awareness of the conservation issues facing both these forests and vulnerable habitats everywhere in the world. Finally, the conservancy seeks to establish a relationship with local communities in the preservation of these lands. It is the philosophy of the MRC that the strongest allies these lands can have are the local communities. Through greater local education of the importance of these lands, greater conservation efforts will be gained.

== Reforestation projects ==
Forest fragments on the island of Ometepe, Nicaragua are ecologically fragile due to the lack of native arboreal primate species who will not traverse the fragmented areas. The Maderas Rainforest Conservancy is in the process of obtaining and protecting these forests around the Maderas volcano on Ometepe. The area is home to an extremely biodiverse population of fauna. Of prime interest to the project are the capuchin monkeys (Cebus capucinus) and howler monkeys (Alouatta palliata). Both capuchin monkeys and howler monkeys are seed germinators and seed disperses What has occurred in the area is agricultural deforestation cutting through corridors that these species use to traverse across the forest. Because of this, large pockets of the forest are left without these species and the seed dispersal they provide the forest. The conservancy is currently mapping out and taking a census of the population and a survey of where these primate species are traveling. This will enable the Maderas Rainforest Conservancy to strategically acquire deforested land for a reforestation project of primate corridors.

== Field school ==
The Maderas Rainforest Conservancy operates two field schools: Ometepe Biological Field School and La Suerte Biological Field School. Both schools offer classes in primatology. These classes offer students the opportunity to study both white-faced capuchin monkeys (Cebus capucinus) and mantled howler monkeys (Alouatta palliata) at the two sites. The field school employs primatologists from universities worldwide to teach the courses. Students usually design, perform, and write up their own research projects.

Besides primatology courses, the field school offers courses in rainforest ecology, herpetology, comparative anatomy, and conservation. In addition to this, the field school has an art program where students can take a variety of art courses in the rainforest.

== Notable research and papers ==
- Garber, P. A.; Rehg, J. A. (1999). "The ecological role of the prehensile tail in white-faced capuchins (Cebus capucinus)". American Journal of Physical Anthropology. 110 (3): 325–39. doi:10.1002/(SICI)1096-8644(199911)110:3<325::AID-AJPA5>3.0.CO;2-D. ISSN 1096-8644. PMID 10516564.
- Winkler, Linda A.; Zhang, Xichen; Ferrell, Robert; Wagner, Robert; Dahl, Jeremy; Peter, Gregory; Sohn, Rex (February 1, 2001). "Geographic Microsatellite Variability in Central American Howling Monkeys". International Journal of Primatology. 25 (1): 197–210. doi:10.1023/B:IJOP.0000014650.86577.b4. ISSN 1573-8604. S2CID 33212552.
- Popp, Jesse N.; Neubauer, Denise; Paciulli, Lisa M.; Huettmann, Falk. "Using TreeNet for Identifying Management Thresholds of Mantled Howling Monkeys' Habitat Preferences on Ometepe Island, Nicaragua, on a Tree and Home Range Scale". Journal of Medical and Biological Sciences. 1 (1). ISSN 1934-7189.
- Garber, P.A.; Pruetz, Jill D.; Lavallee, A.C.; Lavallee, S.G. (December 1999). "A Preliminary Study of Mantled Howling Monkey (Alouatta palliata) Ecology and Conservation on Isla de Ometepe, Nicaragua". Neotropical Primates. 7 (4): 113–17. doi:10.62015/np.1999.v7.434.
