= Sarabia River =

River in Oaxaca and Veracruz, Mexico

Coordinates: 17.1934°N 94.9229°W

Location
- Country: Mexico

The Sarabia River is a river of Mexico.

== See also ==
- List of rivers of Mexico.
