= Havana Shipyards =

The Havana Shipyards are located in the Bay of Havana, Cuba. Managed by Caribbean Drydock Company, Havana Shipyards in 2006 had one graving dock and two floating dry docks, with capacity to 15,000 tonnes deadweight (DWT). They assert the capacity for new construction of pilot boats and barges to 70m, as well as repairs with certification of ISO 9001.
