= Uxpanapa (municipality) =

- Municipality
- Location in Mexico
- Coordinates: 17°17′0″N 94°27′0″W
- Country: Mexico
- State: Veracruz
- Municipal seat: La Chinantla (Poblado 10)
- Municipality created: 31 January 1997

Government
  - Municipal President: Juan Cuauhtémoc Vargas Mendoza (AFV)

Area
  - Total: 2,600 km^{2} (1,000 sq mi)
- Elevation: 38 m (125 ft)

Population (2005)
  - Total: 24,906
  - Density: 9.6/km^{2} (25/sq mi)
- Website: www.uxpanapa.gob.mx

Uxpanapa is a municipality in the southeastern part of the Mexican state of Veracruz, adjacent to the state of Oaxaca. It is bordered by the municipalities of Jesús Carranza, Hidalgotitlán, Minatitlán, and Las Choapas in Veracruz, as well as Santa María Chimalapa in Oaxaca. It has an area of 2,600 km².

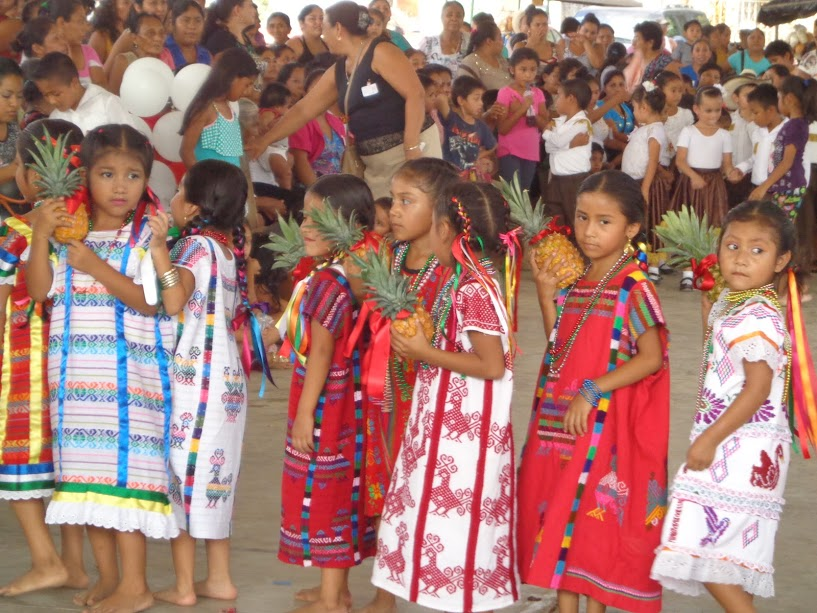
"Dance of the Pineapples" Chinantec dance in Uxpanapa Veracruz Mexico 2015

Its municipal seat is the town of La Chinantla (Poblado Diez), its largest community, with a 2005 census population of 2,579 inhabitants. Other significant communities in the municipality include the towns of Villa Juarez (poblado 1), Saturnino, Helio García Alfaro (Poblado Once), Río Uxpanapa (Poblado Catorce), La laguna, Agustin Melgar, La Horqueta (Poblado Doce), Hermanos Cedillo (Poblado Dos A), Plan de Arroyo (poblado 2 B), and Poblado Cinco. In the 2005 INEGI census the municipality recorded a population of 24,906 inhabitants. The municipality contains a northern extension of the ecologically sensitive Selva Zoque tropical rainforest.

The municipality is located in a valley of the same name, it has excellent ecotourism views, jungles, rock formations and rivers lined with sandy and gravel beaches and caves. The dry season starts in March and ends in June, and the wet season starts in July and ends in February, when it may rain for a whole month.

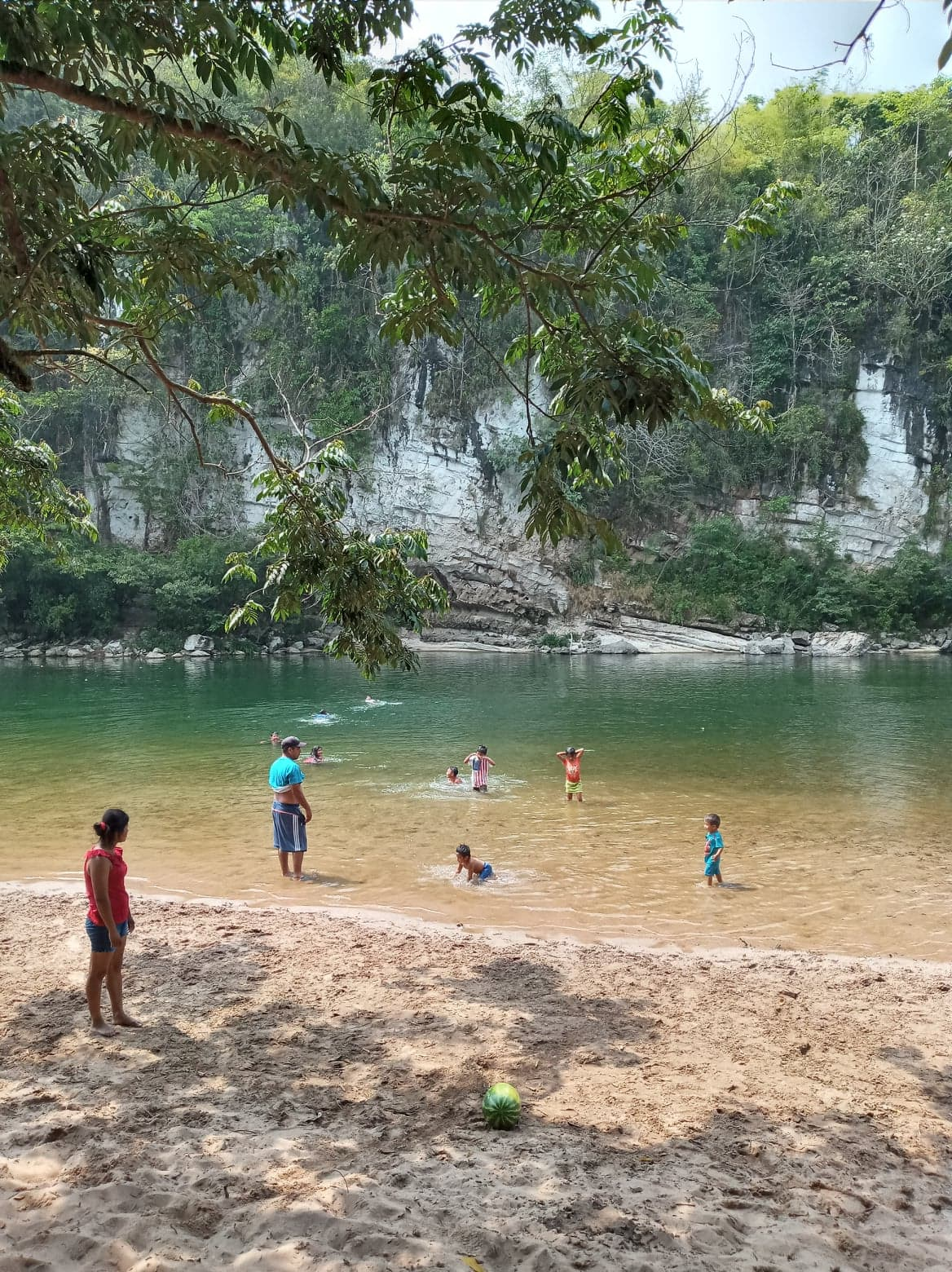
Carolino Anaya River Uxpanapa 2021 (1) 07

It is populated by people of different races, Mexican Blacks (negros, Mulatos), indigenous people, ( Mixe, Zapotec, Chinantec and Tecos as well as mestizos, and people of Spaniard, French, Arabic, and German origins.

The religion of the people is mostly catholic, Protestants, Native Mexican religions, Pre-colonial witchcraft, Wiccan and Atheism.

The region is a source of Olmec, Mayan, Chimalapan, Zapotec and Totonacan Antiquities treasured by the inhabitants, best represented by the lion statue on top of La Esmeralda, Chimalapa municipal agency.

The municipality was the base of "La Gringa" and "EL Corte" plantations, dedicated to the cultivation of rubber plants, bananas, and coffee and the illegal extraction of Emeralds, Gold and Rubies, owned by American companies before being expelled during the Mexican Revolution of 1910.
