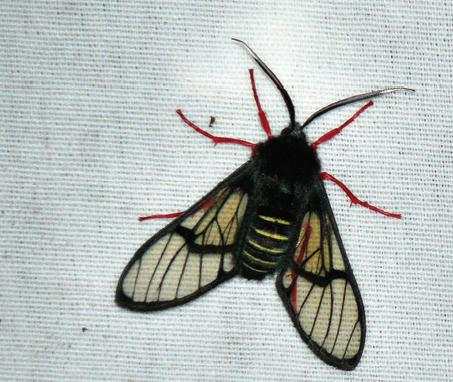

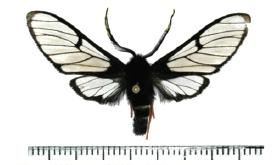

Scientific classification
- Domain: Eukaryota
- Kingdom: Animalia
- Phylum: Arthropoda
- Class: Insecta
- Order: Lepidoptera
- Superfamily: Noctuoidea
- Family: Erebidae
- Subfamily: Arctiinae
- Genus: Homoeocera
- Species: H. georginas

Binomial name
- Homoeocera georginas Laguerre, 2010

= Homoeocera georginas =

Species of moth

Homoeocera georginas is a moth of the subfamily Arctiinae. It is known only for a restricted area in Guatemala, on the Pacific slope, at high altitude.

The length of the forewings is 18–20 mm. The biology of this species is unknown.

== Etymology ==
The name is a reference to the type locality: Fuentes Georginas, a popular spot with hot springs high in the mountains on the Pacific slope.
