= Homoeocera affinis =

Scientific classification
- Domain: Eukaryota
- Kingdom: Animalia
- Phylum: Arthropoda
- Class: Insecta
- Order: Lepidoptera
- Superfamily: Noctuoidea
- Family: Erebidae
- Subfamily: Arctiinae
- Genus: Homoeocera
- Species: H. affinis

Binomial name
- Homoeocera affinis Rothschild, 1931

Species of moth

Homoeocera affinis is a moth of the subfamily Arctiinae. It is found in Venezuela.
