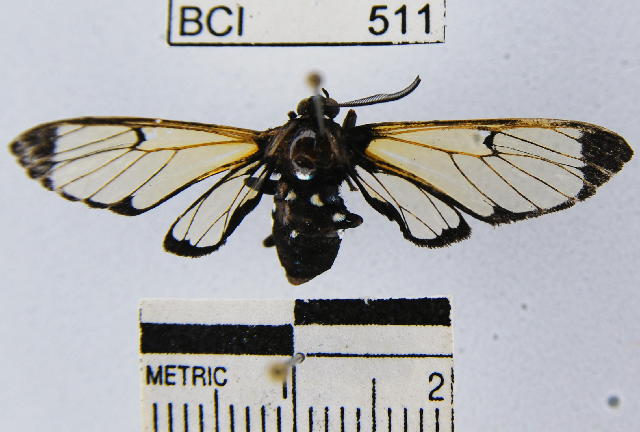

Scientific classification
- Kingdom: Animalia
- Phylum: Arthropoda
- Clade: Pancrustacea
- Class: Insecta
- Order: Lepidoptera
- Superfamily: Noctuoidea
- Family: Erebidae
- Subfamily: Arctiinae
- Genus: Homoeocera
- Species: H. stictosoma

Binomial name
- Homoeocera stictosoma Felder, 1874

= Homoeocera stictosoma =

Species of moth

Homoeocera stictosoma is a moth of the subfamily Arctiinae. It is found in Colombia and Panama.
