= Homoeocera crassa =

Scientific classification
- Kingdom: Animalia
- Phylum: Arthropoda
- Clade: Pancrustacea
- Class: Insecta
- Order: Lepidoptera
- Superfamily: Noctuoidea
- Family: Erebidae
- Subfamily: Arctiinae
- Genus: Homoeocera
- Species: H. crassa

Binomial name
- Homoeocera crassa Felder, 1874

Species of moth

Homoeocera crassa is a moth of the subfamily Arctiinae. It was described by Felder in 1874. It is found in Costa Rica, Bolivia and Colombia.
