= Homoeocera rodriguezi =

Scientific classification
- Domain: Eukaryota
- Kingdom: Animalia
- Phylum: Arthropoda
- Class: Insecta
- Order: Lepidoptera
- Superfamily: Noctuoidea
- Family: Erebidae
- Subfamily: Arctiinae
- Genus: Homoeocera
- Species: H. rodriguezi

Binomial name
- Homoeocera rodriguezi H. Druce, 1890

Species of moth

Homoeocera rodriguezi is a moth of the subfamily Arctiinae first described by Herbert Druce in 1890. It is found in Mexico, Guatemala and Costa Rica.
