= Homoeocera tolosa =

Scientific classification
- Domain: Eukaryota
- Kingdom: Animalia
- Phylum: Arthropoda
- Class: Insecta
- Order: Lepidoptera
- Superfamily: Noctuoidea
- Family: Erebidae
- Subfamily: Arctiinae
- Genus: Homoeocera
- Species: H. tolosa

Binomial name
- Homoeocera tolosa (H. Druce, 1883)

Synonyms
- Isanthrene tolosa H. Druce, 1883

Species of moth

Homoeocera tolosa is a moth of the subfamily Arctiinae first described by Herbert Druce in 1883. It is found in Ecuador.
