= Homoeocera sahacon =

Scientific classification
- Domain: Eukaryota
- Kingdom: Animalia
- Phylum: Arthropoda
- Class: Insecta
- Order: Lepidoptera
- Superfamily: Noctuoidea
- Family: Erebidae
- Subfamily: Arctiinae
- Genus: Homoeocera
- Species: H. sahacon

Binomial name
- Homoeocera sahacon H. Druce, 1896

Species of moth

Homoeocera sahacon is a moth of the subfamily Arctiinae! first described by Herbert Druce in 1896. It is found in Panama.
