= Homoeocera rhodocera =

Scientific classification
- Domain: Eukaryota
- Kingdom: Animalia
- Phylum: Arthropoda
- Class: Insecta
- Order: Lepidoptera
- Superfamily: Noctuoidea
- Family: Erebidae
- Subfamily: Arctiinae
- Genus: Homoeocera
- Species: H. rhodocera

Binomial name
- Homoeocera rhodocera Schaus, 1904

Species of moth

Homoeocera rhodocera is a moth of the subfamily Arctiinae. It is found in Panama.
