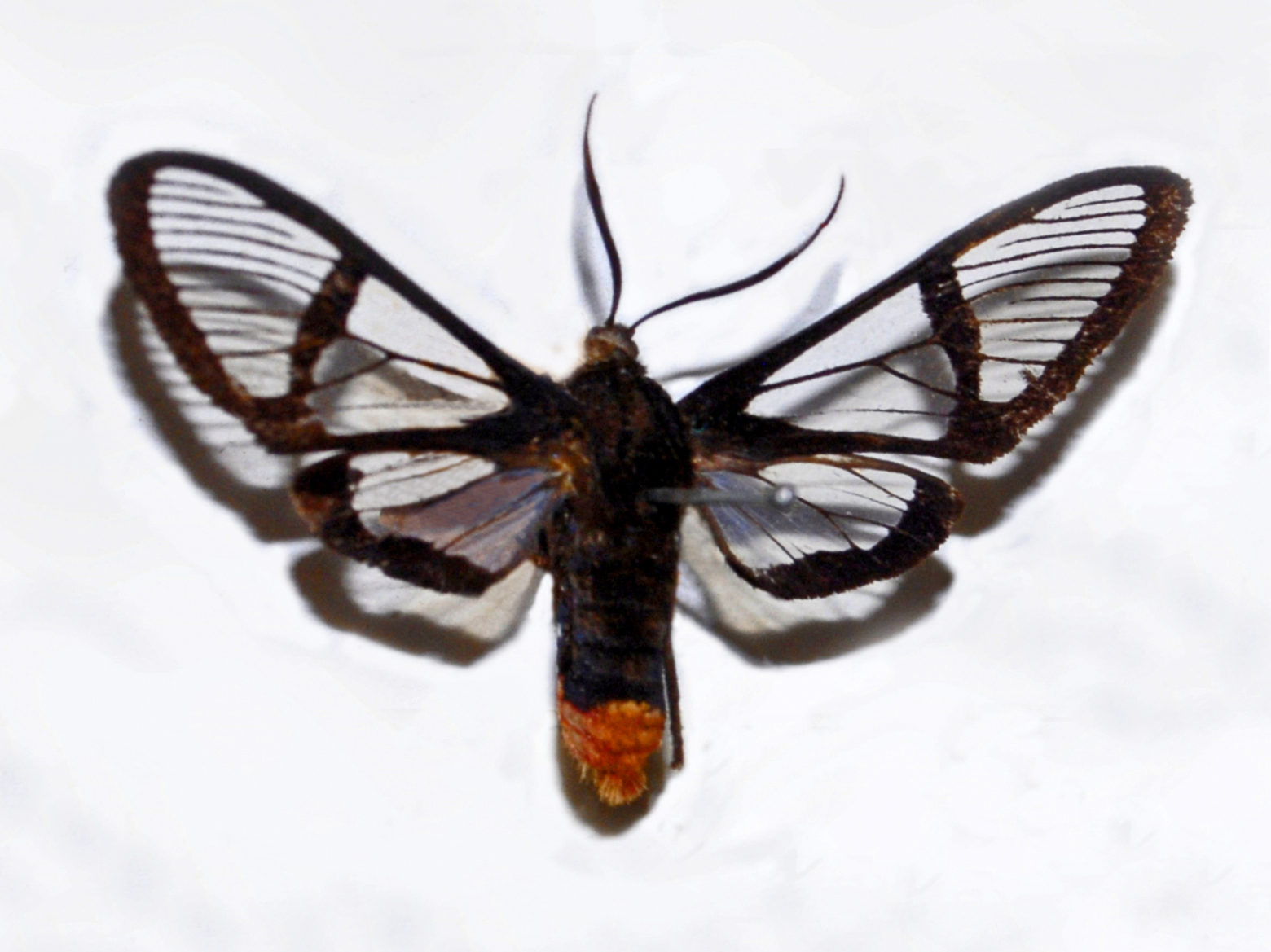

Scientific classification
- Domain: Eukaryota
- Kingdom: Animalia
- Phylum: Arthropoda
- Class: Insecta
- Order: Lepidoptera
- Superfamily: Noctuoidea
- Family: Erebidae
- Subfamily: Arctiinae
- Genus: Homoeocera
- Species: H. lophocera

Binomial name
- Homoeocera lophocera H. Druce, 1898

= Homoeocera lophocera =

Species of moth

Homoeocera lophocera is a moth of the subfamily Arctiinae first described by Herbert Druce in 1898. It is found in Brazil.
