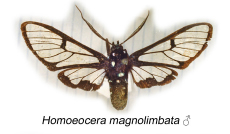

Scientific classification
- Domain: Eukaryota
- Kingdom: Animalia
- Phylum: Arthropoda
- Class: Insecta
- Order: Lepidoptera
- Superfamily: Noctuoidea
- Family: Erebidae
- Subfamily: Arctiinae
- Genus: Homoeocera
- Species: H. magnolimbata

Binomial name
- Homoeocera magnolimbata Dognin, 1911

= Homoeocera magnolimbata =

Species of moth

Homoeocera magnolimbata is a moth of the subfamily Arctiinae. It is found in French Guiana.
