= Homoeocera modesta =

Scientific classification
- Domain: Eukaryota
- Kingdom: Animalia
- Phylum: Arthropoda
- Class: Insecta
- Order: Lepidoptera
- Superfamily: Noctuoidea
- Family: Erebidae
- Subfamily: Arctiinae
- Genus: Homoeocera
- Species: H. modesta

Binomial name
- Homoeocera modesta Draudt, 1915

Species of moth

Homoeocera modesta is a moth of the subfamily Arctiinae. It is found in Bolivia.
