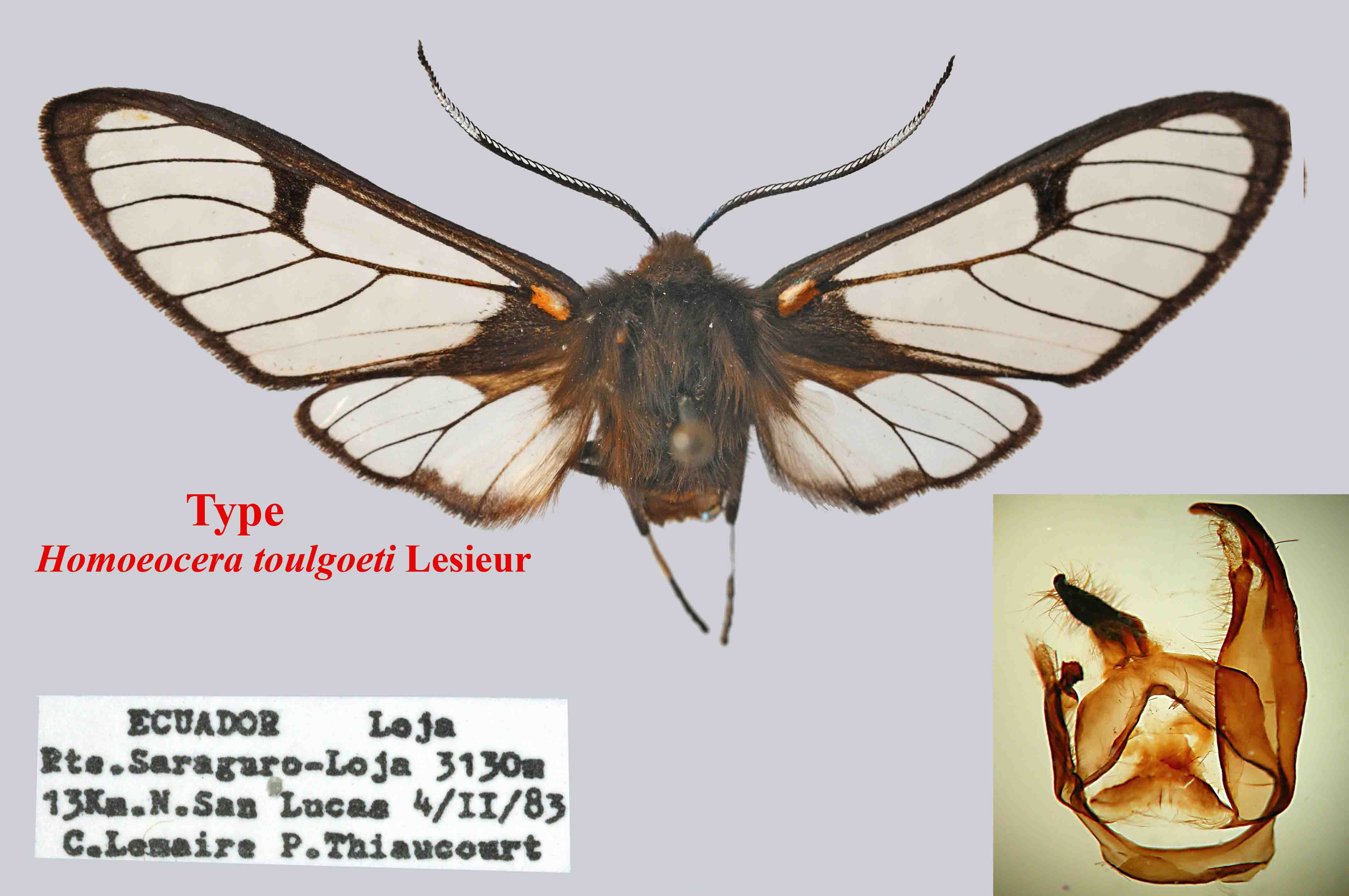
- Homoeocera toulgoeti

Scientific classification
- Domain: Eukaryota
- Kingdom: Animalia
- Phylum: Arthropoda
- Class: Insecta
- Order: Lepidoptera
- Superfamily: Noctuoidea
- Family: Erebidae
- Subfamily: Arctiinae
- Genus: Homoeocera
- Species: H. toulgoeti

Binomial name
- Homoeocera toulgoeti Lesieur, 1984

= Homoeocera toulgoeti =

Species of moth

Homoeocera toulgoeti is a moth of the subfamily Arctiinae first described by Xavier Lesieur in 1984. It is found in Ecuador.
