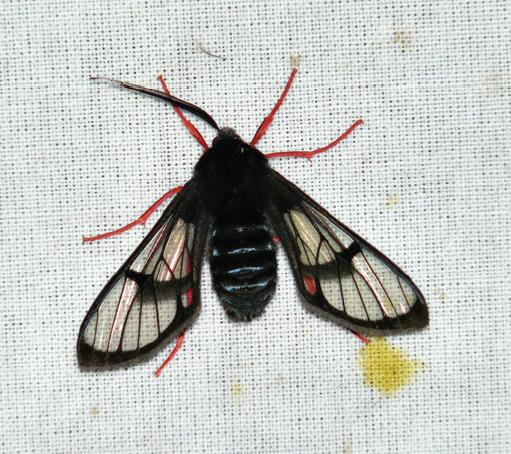
- Homoeocera gigantea

Scientific classification
- Domain: Eukaryota
- Kingdom: Animalia
- Phylum: Arthropoda
- Class: Insecta
- Order: Lepidoptera
- Superfamily: Noctuoidea
- Family: Erebidae
- Subfamily: Arctiinae
- Subtribe: Euchromiina
- Genus: Homoeocera; Felder, 1874

Type species
- Homoeocera crassa Felder, 1874

= Homoeocera =

Genus of moths

Homoeocera is a genus of moths in the subfamily Arctiinae The genus was erected by Cajetan Felder in 1874.

== Species ==
- Homoeocera affinis Rothschild, 1931
- Homoeocera acuminata (Walker, 1856)
- Homoeocera crassa Felder, 1874
- Homoeocera duronia Druce, 1910
- Homoeocera georginas Laguerre, 2010
- Homoeocera gigantea Druce, 1884
- Homoeocera ianthina Draudt, 1915
- Homoeocera lophocera Druce, 1898
- Homoeocera magnolimbata Dognin, 1911
- Homoeocera modesta Draudt, 1915
- Homoeocera multipuncta Rothschild, 1931
- Homoeocera papalo Laguerre, 2010
- Homoeocera rhodocera Schaus, 1904
- Homoeocera rodriguezi Druce, 1890
- Homoeocera sahacon Druce, 1896
- Homoeocera sandion Druce, 1910
- Homoeocera stictosoma Druce, 1898
- Homoeocera tolosa (Druce, 1883)
- Homoeocera toulgoeti Lesieur, 1984
- Homoeocera trizona Dognin, 1906
