= Homoeocera trizona =

Scientific classification
- Domain: Eukaryota
- Kingdom: Animalia
- Phylum: Arthropoda
- Class: Insecta
- Order: Lepidoptera
- Superfamily: Noctuoidea
- Family: Erebidae
- Subfamily: Arctiinae
- Genus: Homoeocera
- Species: H. trizona

Binomial name
- Homoeocera trizona Dognin, 1906

Synonyms
- Homoeocera albizonata Dognin, 1914; Homoeocera staminea Draudt, 1915

Species of moth

Homoeocera trizona is a moth of the subfamily Arctiinae first described by Paul Dognin in 1906. It is found in Colombia and Venezuela.
