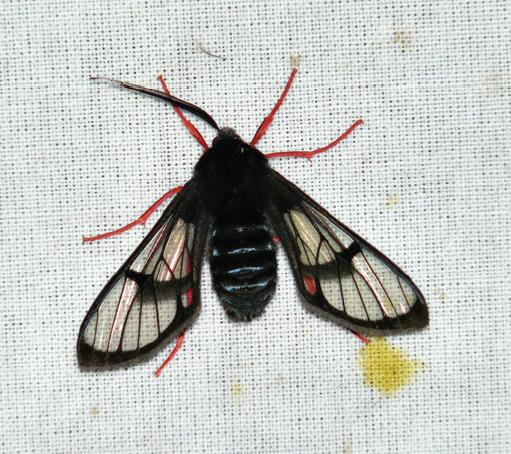

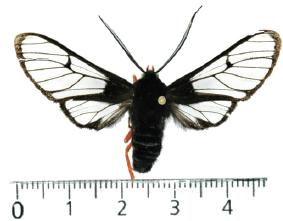

Scientific classification
- Domain: Eukaryota
- Kingdom: Animalia
- Phylum: Arthropoda
- Class: Insecta
- Order: Lepidoptera
- Superfamily: Noctuoidea
- Family: Erebidae
- Subfamily: Arctiinae
- Genus: Homoeocera
- Species: H. gigantea

Binomial name
- Homoeocera gigantea (H. Druce, 1884)

Synonyms
- Gymnelia gigantea H. Druce, 1884

= Homoeocera gigantea =

Species of moth

Homoeocera gigantea is a moth of the subfamily Arctiinae first described by Herbert Druce in 1884. It is found from Guatemala to Costa Rica, generally at high altitude in very humid biotopes. It is not presently known from Nicaragua, possibly because collecting at high altitude is difficult due to the topography of the country.

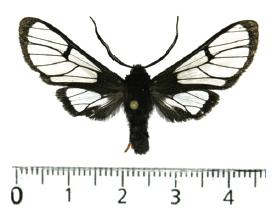

The biology of this species is unknown.

== Description ==
It is a robust species, characterized by clear (not yellowish) transparent wings with black borders and crimson-red legs. The length of the forewings is 21–24 mm.
