= Homoeocera acuminata =

Scientific classification
- Kingdom: Animalia
- Phylum: Arthropoda
- Class: Insecta
- Order: Lepidoptera
- Superfamily: Noctuoidea
- Family: Erebidae
- Subfamily: Arctiinae
- Genus: Homoeocera
- Species: H. acuminata

Binomial name
- Homoeocera acuminata (Walker, 1856)

Synonyms
- Lagaria acuminata Walker, 1856; Gartha dalsa Schaus, 1892; Homoeocera leucostalacta Burmeister, 1879; Homoeocera quinquepuncta Heyl

Species of moth

Homoeocera acuminata is a moth of the subfamily Arctiinae first described by Francis Walker in 1856. It is found in Paraná, Brazil.
