= Classification of Mixtec languages =

Internal classification of Mixtec languages

The distribution of various Mixtec languages and their classification per Glottolog

Regions and districts of Oaxaca

The internal classification of Mixtec is controversial. Many varieties are mutually unintelligible and by that criterion separate languages. In the 16th century, Spanish authorities recognized half a dozen lenguas comprising the Mixtec lengua. (See #Classical Mixtec.) It is not clear to what extent these were distinct languages at the time. Regardless, the colonial disintegration of the Mixtec nation and resulting isolation of local communities led to the rapid diversification of local dialects into distinct languages. Below are some attempts at Mixtec classification by various scholars.

== Geographic divisions ==
Josserand (1983:106) lists 5 major geographic (not linguistic) divisions of Mixtec, which together cover a total of about 25,000 square kilometers. Enclaves of Amuzgo, Trique, Cuicatec, Ixcatec, and Chocho speakers are scattered nearby.

1. Puebla Mixtec
2. Guerrero Mixtec
3. Mixteca Baja
4. Mixteca Alta
5. Mixteca de la Costa

== Colonial divisions ==
De los Reyes, in his Arte de Lengua Mixteca (1593), spoke of half a dozen lenguas in the Mixtec lengua. To these, his contemporaries added the dialects of Guerrero:

- the lengua of Teposcolula, including the major communities of Tamazulapan, Tilantongo, Texupa, and Mitlatongo (Jiménez-Moreno: Tepozcolula–Tilantongo; the prestige dialect chosen by de los Reyes)
- the lengua of Yanhuitlán, incl. Coixtlahuaca, Xaltepec, and Nochixtlán (Jiménez-Moreno: Yuanhuitlán–Cuilapan)
- the lengua of Tlaxiaco and Achiutla (the prestige dialect chosen by Hernández)
- the lengua of the Mixteca Baja
- the lengua of Cuilapa and Guaxolotitlán in the Valley of Oaxaca (Jiménez-Moreno: Cuauhxochpan–Cuyamecalco)
- the lengua of the Mixteca de la Costa
- the Mixtec of Guerrero

Josserand found that native mundane writing of the colonial era corresponded well to de los Reyes; based on phonological and orthographic consistencies, she divides the dialects into five groups, as follows:

- the Baja area around Huajuapan (though there were multiple varieties in Baja, more than de los Reyes recognized)
- the Oaxaca Valley around Cuilapan, closely related to the next
- the northeastern Alta around the Valley of Nochixtlan, including Yanhuitlan and Coixtlahuaca
- the eastern Alta around the Valleys of Teposcolula and Tamasulapa
- the western Alta around the Valley of Tlaxiaco, Achiutla, and Chalcatongo

== Holland (1959) ==
The following classification is given by William R. Holland (1959), as cited in Josserand (1983:134-135). This preliminary classification is a glottochronological study of the dialects of 22 Mixtec and 4 Cuicatec towns.

- Zone 1: Ixtayutla, Mechoacán, Jamiltepec, Huazolotitlán, Pinotepa Nacional
- Zone 2: Ixtayutla, Mechoacán, Jamiltepec, Pinotepa de Don Luis, Pinotepa Nacional, Atoyac, Tlacamama
- Zone 3: Santo Tomás Ocotepec, Santa Lucía Monte Verde, San Miguel el Grande, San Esteban Atatlahuca
- Zone 4: San Rafael Guerrero
- Zone 5: Juxtlahuaca
- Zone 6: Santa María Peñoles, Huitepec
- Zone 7: Peñoles
- Zone 8: Jocoticpac / Jocotipac
- Zone 9: Cuyamecalco
- Zone 10: San Juan Coatzospan
- Zone 11: Chigmecatitlán, Santa Catarina Tlaltempan

Holland (1959) also gives 3 areal groupings for these zones.

- Costa: Zones 1, 2
- Alta: Zones 3, 4, 5, 6, 7
- Baja: Zones 8, 9, 10, 11

However, Josserand (1983) states that these groupings are based on flawed methodologies, including a faulty conception of the geographical layout of the Mixteca. Many towns that Holland listed as Baja are in fact Alta, and vice versa.

== Arana (1960) ==
The following classification is given by Evangelina Arana-Osnaya (1960:257), as cited in Josserand (1983:137).

- Group 1: Chigmecatitlán, Tlaltempan
- Group 2: Cuyamecalco, San Juan Coatzospan
- Group 3a: Huitepec, Peñoles, Santa María Peñoles, San Juan Tamazola
- Group 3b: Cuilapan; probably also Xoxocotla and other towns - where Mixtec is now no longer spoken
- Group 4a: San Miguel el Grande, San Esteban Atatlahuca, Santo Tomás Ocotepec, Jocoticpac; San Rafael in Guerrero
- Group 4b: Mechoacán, Jamiltepec, Pinotepa de Don Luis, Ixtayutla, Huazolotitlán, Tlacamama, Pinotepa Nacional, Atoyac

== Mak & Longacre (1960) ==
Cornelia Mak and Robert Longacre (1960) is the first reconstruction of Proto-Mixtec, which is the ancestor of Mixtec proper as opposed to Mixtecan. Below is a classification inferred from Mak & Longacre (1960) by Josserand (1983:142). 9 groups and a total of 28 towns are given.

- Central Mixteca Alta: San Miguel el Grande, San Esteban Atatlahuca
- Southern Mixteca Alta: Santiago Yosondúa, Santa Cruz Itundujia, San Mateo Santigui, San Pedro el Alto, San Fernando Yucucundo
- Western Mixteca Alta: Santo Tomás Ocotepec
- Lowland Mixteca (Mixteca de la Costa): Jicaltepec, Pinotepa de Don Luis, Mechoacán, Tlacamama, Atoyac
- Mixteca Baja: San Juan Mixtepec, Juxtlahuaca
- Guerrero: Metlatonoc
- Puebla: Tonahuixtla, Xayacatlán, Chigmecatitlán
- Eastern Mixteca Alta: Estetla, Tilantongo, Tidaa, San Juan Diuxi, Santiago Mitlatongo, Nuxaa, San Juan Tamazola
- Northeastern Mixteca Alta: San Juan Coatzospan, Cuyamecalco

== Spores (1967) ==
The following classification, based on "archaeological, ethnohistorical and modern information in his delimitation of interaction spheres within the Mixteca", is given by Richard Spores in The Mixtec Kings and Their People (1967), as cited in Josserand (1983:128). A total of 18 dialects are given.

- Apoala, Apasco, Sosola; eastern frontier with Chinantec, Cuicatec, and Zapotec
- Coixtlahuaca, Huautla, Tequixixtepec
- Tonalá, Chila, Petlalcingo, Mariscala, Acatlán; towns on the northern frontier with Nahuatl and Tlapanec
- Huajuapan
- Silacayoapan; ranchos on Guerrero border
- Tecomaxtlahuaca, Juxtlahuaca
- Tlaxiaco, and its ranchos of Cuquila, Ñumí, Mixtepec
- Teposcolula, and its ranchos; Tayata, Achiutla, and about 8 other communities, all of which use the Teposcolula market
- Tilantongo, and its ranchos; Mitlatongo
- Chalcatongo, San Miguel el Grande
- Yucuañe, and 9 or 10 surrounding communities
- Teozacoalco, Peñoles
- Putla
- Zacatepec
- Tututepec, Jamiltepec
- Yolotepec
- Yanhuitlán, Chicahua, Soyaltepec, Cántaros, Coyotepec, Nochixtlán, Tonaltepec
- Tamazulapan, Tejutla, Teotongo, Chilapa de Díaz

== Bradley (1968, 1970) ==
The following classification is given by C. Henry Bradley (1970), as cited in Josserand (1983:132). A total of 11 languages are given. His classification was most likely based on SIL International's mutual intelligibility surveys.

- Northern: Xayacatlán, Huajuapan, Chigmecatitlán
- Northeastern: Apoala, Coatzospan, Cuyamecalco
- Eastern: Peñoles, Tilantongo, Huitepec
- East-central: Amoltepec
- Central: Yosondúa, San Miguel, Molinos, San Esteban (Atatlahuca), Santo Tomás (Ocotepec), Mixtepec
- South-central: Nuyoo–Yucuite, Itundujia
- West-central: Silacayoapan–Juxtlahuaca
- Western: Metlatonoc, Coicoyán
- Southwestern: Ayutla
- Southern: Jicaltepec, Chayuco, Zacatepec
- Southeastern: Tututepec

However, Bradley (1968) had given a different classification which included only 7 languages.

- Northeast: Apoala, Cuyamecalco
- Northwest: Chigmecatitlán, Xayacatlán–Chazumba, Cacaloxtepec
- Mixteca Baja: Mixtepec, Juxtlahuaca–Silacayoapan, Coicoyán
- Guerrero: Coatzingo, Malinaltepec, Yolosochitl, Ayutla
- Mixteca de la Costa: Zacatepec, Pinotepa, Ixtayutla, Jamiltepec, Tututepec
- Western Mixteca Alta: Ñumí, Chalcatongo, Yosondúa, Itundujia, Atatlahuca
- Eastern Mixteca Alta: Peñoles, Tilantongo

== Egland & Bartholomew (1983) ==
Egland & Bartholomew find 29 groups at a 70% mutual-intelligibility level. The towns they tested are the following, grouped at 60% intelligibility; a question mark indicates that intelligibility testing had not been done with non-neighboring varieties.

- Coatzospan–Cuyamecalco
  - Santa Ana Cuauhtémoc [w Cuyamecalco per E16], Coatzospan [miz]
  - Cuyamecalco [xtu]
- Apoala, Jocotipac, Ixtaltepec, Chicahua [mip]
- San Bartolo Soyaltepec [vmq]
- Santiago Chazumba [xtb], Tonahuixtla, Cosoltepec [xtb], Xayacatlán de Bravo [mit], Tepejillo, Zapotitlán Palmas [mit]; Petlalcingo [mit, xtb both in the town]
  - [65% Xayacatlán in the other direction]
- Chigmecatitlán [mii]
- Nuxaá [mxy]
- Estetla, Peñoles [mil]; Huitepec [mxs, mil]; Tlazoyaltepec [mqh, mil]; San Juan Tamazola [vmx]
- Tidaá [mtx] (60% w Peñoles)
- San Miguel Piedras [xtp]
- Tilantongo [xtd]
- ?Ñumí–Tlacotepec
  - Ñumí, Nunduchi, Nicananduta, San Antonio Monteverde [xtn], Sto. Tomás Ocotepec [mie]; Yucuañe [mvg]
  - Tlacotepec [xtm] (69% w Atatláhuca)
- Yucunicoco [vmc], San Juan Mixtepec [mix] (unidirectional intelligibility)
- Nuyoo, Yucuhiti [meh]
- San Esteban Atatláhuca (68% w Yosondúa) [mib], Santa Lucía Monteverde [mdv]; Molinos; Itundujía [mce]
- Yosondúa (70% w Atatláhuca) [mpm], San Miguel el Grande, Chalcatongo [mig]; Yolotepec; Teita [xtj]
- Santa Maria Sindihui [xts]
- Silacayopan group
  - Cacaloxtepec [miu]
  - Silacayoapan, San Jorge Nuchita [mks], Ixpantepec Nieves, Santiago Tamazola, San Simón Zahuatlán, Atenango, Yucuñuti [mxb], San Miguel Ahuehuetitlán;
    Juxtlahuaca: Tecomastlahuaca, San Rafael Tepejillo, Juxtlahuaca, Tindú [vmc]; Cahuatache [mim]; Metlatónoc [mxv]
  - Coicoyán, S. M. Peras [jmx]
  - Guadalupe Portezuelo [mxa w Zahuatlán]
- ?Cuatzoquitengo [mim] (not close to Cahuatache)
- Ayutla [miy] (divergent)
- Amoltepec [mbz]
- Tututepec (61% w Ixtayutla), Acatepec [mtu]
- Chayuco–Zacatepec
  - San Cristobál (60% w Jicaltepec) [mxt], Mechoacán, Chayuco [mih] (69% Coicoyán)
  - ?Ixtayutla [vmj] (80% w San Cristobál, 79%/63% Amoltepec, 59% Chayuco)
  - Zacatepec [mza]
- Jicaltepec [mio] (74% w Ixtayutla), Colorado [mjc], Tepetlapa, Sayultepec, Don Luis, [Western] Jamiltepec, Jicayán, San Lorenzo, Atoyac; Huazolotitlán [w Eastern Jamiltepec per E16]

== Ethnologue ==
The classification of Ethnologue is largely based on Egland & Bartholomew. There is no sub-classification, only a list of 52 varieties, though these are reported to have a great range of intelligibility, from essentially none to 90% or higher.

- Alacatlatzala Mixtec [mim]
- Alcozauca Mixtec [xta]
- Amoltepec Mixtec [mbz]
- Apasco-Apoala Mixtec [mip]
- Atatláhuca Mixtec [mib]
- Ayutla Mixtec [miy]
- Cacaloxtepec Mixtec [miu]
- Chayuco Mixtec [mih]
- Chazumba Mixtec [xtb]
- Chigmecatitlán Mixtec [mii]
- Coatzospan Mixtec [miz]
- Cuyamecalco Mixtec [xtu]
- Diuxi-Tilantongo Mixtec [xtd]
- Huitepec Mixtec [mxs]
- Itundujia Mixtec [mce]
- Ixtayutla Mixtec [vmj]
- Jamiltepec Mixtec [mxt]
- Juxtlahuaca Mixtec [vmc]
- Magdalena Peñasco Mixtec [xtm]
- Metlatónoc Mixtec [mxv]
- Mitlatongo Mixtec [vmm]
- Mixtepec Mixtec [mix]
- Northern Tlaxiaco Mixtec [xtn]
- Northwest Oaxaca Mixtec [mxa]
- Ocotepec Mixtec [mie]
- Peñoles Mixtec [mil]
- Pinotepa Nacional Mixtec [mio]
- San Juan Colorado Mixtec [mjc]
- San Juan Teita Mixtec [xtj]
- San Miguel el Grande Mixtec [mig]
- San Miguel Piedras Mixtec [xtp]
- Santa Lucía Monteverde Mixtec [mdv]
- Santa María Zacatepec Mixtec [mza]
- Silacayoapan Mixtec [mks]
- Sindihui Mixtec [xts]
- Sinicahua Mixtec [xti]
- Southeastern Nochixtlán Mixtec [mxy]
- Southern Puebla Mixtec [mit]
- Southwestern Tlaxiaco Mixtec [meh]
- Soyaltepec Mixtec [vmq]
- Tacahua Mixtec [xtt]
- Tamazola Mixtec [vmx]
- Tezoatlán Mixtec [mxb]
- Tidaá Mixtec [mtx]
- Tijaltepec Mixtec [xtl]
- Tlazoyaltepec Mixtec [mqh]
- Tututepec Mixtec [mtu]
- Western Juxtlahuaca Mixtec [jmx]
- Yoloxóchitl Mixtec [xty]
- Yosondúa Mixtec [mpm]
- Yucuañe Mixtec [mvg]
- Yutanduchi Mixtec [mab]

== See also ==
- Municipalities of Oaxaca
- Municipalities of Guerrero
- List of Oto-Manguean languages
- Oto-Manguean languages
  - Mixtecan languages
  - Mixtec languages
- Classification of indigenous languages of the Americas

== Notes and references ==
- Egland, Steven, Doris Bartholomew, and Saúl Cruz Ramos. 1983. La inteligibilidad interdialectal en México: Resultados de algunos sondeos. México, D.F: Instituto Lingüístico de Verano.: https://web.archive.org/web/20151122014320/http://www-01.sil.org/mexico/sondeos/G038a-SondeosInteligibilidad.htm - Note: The 1983 date is only a reprint date. Actual publication date is 1978.
- Josserand, Judy Kathryn. 1983. Mixtec Dialect History. Ph.D. Dissertation, Tulane University.
