= List of endangered languages in Mexico =

Language Endangerment Status by UNESCO Atlas of the World's Languages in Danger category

Extinct (EX)
- Extinct (EX): (lists)

Endangered
- Critically Endangered (CR); Severely Endangered (SE); Definitely Endangered (DE); Vulnerable (VU): (list); (list); (list); (list)

Safe
- Safe (NE): no list
- Other categories
- Revived (RE); Constructed (CL): (list); (list)
- Related topics: Atlas of the World's Languages in Danger; Endangered Languages Project; Ethnologue; Unclassified language; List of languages by total number of speakers
- UNESCO Atlas of the World's; Languages in Danger categories

An endangered language is a language that it is at risk of falling out of use, generally because it has few surviving speakers. If it loses all of its native speakers, it becomes an extinct language. UNESCO defines four levels of language endangerment between "safe" (not endangered) and "extinct":

- Vulnerable
- Definitely endangered
- Severely endangered
- Critically endangered

== Languages ==
Language	Speakers	Status	Comments	Ref
Acatepec Mazatec language, Acatepec Mazatec		Vulnerable		
Akatek language, Akatek		Vulnerable		
Awakatek language, Awakatek		Critically endangered		
Ayapanec language, Ayapanec		Critically endangered		
Ayapenaco language, Ayapenaco		Critically endangered		
Ayautla Mazatec language, Ayautla Mazatec		Vulnerable		
Central Cuicatec language, Central Cuicatec		Vulnerable		
Central Náhuatl language, Central Náhuatl		Vulnerable		
Central Otomí language, Central Otomí		Definitely endangered		
Central Pame language, Central Pame		Vulnerable		
Central Popoloc language, Central Popoloc		Severely endangered		
Central Tlapanec language, Central Tlapanec		Vulnerable		
Central Zoque language, Central Zoque		Definitely endangered		
Chatino of the western lowlands		Definitely endangered		
Chatino of Zacatepec language, Chatino of Zacatepec		Definitely endangered		
Chichimec language, Chichimec		Vulnerable		
Chihuahua Lower Pima language, Chihuahua Lower Pima		Definitely endangered		
Chilchotla Mazatec language, Chilchotla Mazatec		Vulnerable		
Chiquihuitlán Mazatec language, Chiquihuitlán Mazatec		Definitely endangered		
Chontal Tabasco language, Chontal Tabasco		Severely endangered		
Chuj language, Chuj		Critically endangered		
Cocopa language, Cocopa		Definitely endangered		
Eastern Chocho language, Eastern Chocho		Severely endangered		
Eastern Cuicatec language, Eastern Cuicatec		Vulnerable		
Eastern Mazahua language, Eastern Mazahua		Definitely endangered		
Eastern Popoloc language, Eastern Popoloc		Vulnerable		
Eastern Tlapanec language, Eastern Tlapanec		Vulnerable		
Eloxochitlán Mazatec language, Eloxochitlán Mazatec		Vulnerable		
Filomeno Mata Totonac language, Filomeno Mata Totonac		Vulnerable		
Higher Reservoir Mazatec language, Higher Reservoir Mazatec		Vulnerable		
Highland Chontal language, Highland Chontal		Severely endangered		
Highland Mazatec language, Highland Mazatec		Vulnerable		
Huasteca Náhuatl language, Huasteca Náhuatl		Vulnerable		
Huehuetla Tepehua language, Huehuetla Tepehua		Definitely endangered		
Huehuetlán Mazatec language, Huehuetlán Mazatec		Vulnerable		
Huichol language, Huichol		Vulnerable		
Isthmus Náhuatl language, Isthmus Náhuatl		Vulnerable		
Ixcatec language, Ixcatec		Critically endangered		
Ixcatlán Mazatec language, Ixcatlán Mazatec		Vulnerable		
Ixil language, Ixil		Critically endangered		
Ixtenco Otomí language, Ixtenco Otomí		Severely endangered		
Jakaltek language, Jakaltek		Severely endangered		
Kʼicheʼ language, Kʼicheʼ		Definitely endangered		
Kaqchikel language, Kaqchikel		Critically endangered		
Kickapoo language, Kickapoo		Critically endangered		
Kiliwa language, Kiliwa		Critically endangered		
Lacandón language, Lacandón		Critically endangered		
Lower Mixe language, Lower Mixe		Vulnerable		
Lower Northwestern Otomí language, Lower Northwestern Otomí		Vulnerable		
Lowland Chontal language, Lowland Chontal		Critically endangered		
Lowland Mazatec language, Lowland Mazatec		Vulnerable		
Malinaltepec Tlapanec language, Malinaltepec Tlapanec		Vulnerable		
Mam language, Mam		Severely endangered		
Matlatzinca language, Matlatzinca		Definitely endangered		
Mayo language, Mayo		Critically endangered		
Mazatlán Mazatec language, Mazatlán Mazatec		Vulnerable		
Mezquital Otomí language, Mezquital Otomí		Definitely endangered		
Misantla Totonac language, Misantla Totonac		Critically endangered		
Mixtec of San Miguel Piedras language, Mixtec of San Miguel Piedras		Severely endangered		
Mixtec of San Pedro Tidaá language, Mixtec of San Pedro Tidaá		Severely endangered		
Mixtec of Santa Cruz Itundujia language, Mixtec of Santa Cruz Itundujia		Definitely endangered		
Mixtec of Santa Inés de Zaragoza language, Mixtec of Santa Inés de Zaragoza		Definitely endangered		
Mixtec of the central Ravine		Definitely endangered		
Mixtec of the northeast lowlands		Severely endangered		
Mixtec of the Puebla-Oaxaca border (several Mixtec languages go by this name; UNESCO intends Chazumba Mixtec)		Definitely endangered		
Mixtec of the southwest of Puebla		Definitely endangered		
Mixtec of Tlaltempan language, Mixtec of Tlaltempan		Definitely endangered		
Mixtec of Villa de Tututepec language, Mixtec of Villa de Tututepec		Definitely endangered		
Mixtec of Zapotitlán language, Mixtec of Zapotitlán		Severely endangered		
Motocintlec language, Motocintlec		Critically endangered		
Mountain Guarijío language, Mountain Guarijío		Vulnerable		
Northern Cuicatec language, Northern Cuicatec		Vulnerable		
Northern Pame language, Northern Pame		Definitely endangered		
Northern Popoloc language, Northern Popoloc		Vulnerable		
Northern Tepehuán language, Northern Tepehuán		Definitely endangered		
Northern Tlapanec language, Northern Tlapanec		Vulnerable		
Northern Totonac language, Northern Totonac		Critically endangered		
Northwestern Otomí language, Northwestern Otomí		Vulnerable		
Northwestern Tarahumara language, Northwestern Tarahumara		Vulnerable		
Northwestern Tlapanec language, Northwestern Tlapanec		Vulnerable		
Oʼodham language, Oʼodham		Definitely endangered		
Ocopetatillo Mazatec language, Ocopetatillo Mazatec		Vulnerable		
Ocoyoacac Otomí language, Ocoyoacac Otomí		Severely endangered		
Olultecan language, Olultecan [typo]		Severely endangered		
Ozumatlán Totonac language, Ozomatlán Totonac		Critically endangered		
Paipai language, Paipai		Severely endangered		
Papantla Totonac language, Papantla Totonac		Definitely endangered		
Patla-Chicontla Totonac language, Patla-Chicontla Totonac		Severely endangered		
Purépecha language, Purépecha		Vulnerable		
Pisaflores Tepehua language, Pisaflores Tepehua		Vulnerable		
Puebla Mazatec language, Puebla Mazatec		Vulnerable		
River Guarijío language, River Guarijío		Vulnerable		
San Dionisio del Mar Huave language, San Dionisio del Mar Huave		Definitely endangered		
San Francisco del Mar Huave language, San Francisco del Mar Huave		Critically endangered		
San Mateo del Mar Huave language, San Mateo del Mar Huave		Vulnerable		
Santa María del Mar Huave language, Santa María del Mar Huave		Severely endangered		
Sayultec language, Sayultec		Definitely endangered		
Seri language, Seri		Vulnerable		
Sierra de Puebla Nahuatl language, Sierra de Puebla Náhuatl		Definitely endangered		
Sierra Otomí language, Sierra Otomí		Vulnerable		
Sierra Popoluca language, Sierra Popoluca		Vulnerable		
Sierra Totonac language, Sierra Totonac		Severely endangered		
Sonora Lower Pima language, Sonora Lower Pima		Severely endangered		
Southeastern Tarahumara language, Southeastern Tarahumara		Vulnerable		
Southern Chocho language, Southern Chocho		Severely endangered		
Southern Tlapanec language, Southern Tlapanec		Severely endangered		
Southern Zoque language, Southern Zoque		Definitely endangered		
Southwestern Tepehuan language, Southwestern Tepehuan		Vulnerable		
Southwestern Tlapanec language, Southwestern Tlapanec		Vulnerable		
Soyaltepec Mazatec language, Soyaltepec Mazatec		Vulnerable		
Tabasco Náhuatl language, Tabasco Náhuatl		Critically endangered		
Tecóatl Mazatec language, Tecóatl Mazatec		Vulnerable		
Teko language, Teko		Severely endangered		
Texistepecan language, Texistepecan		Severely endangered		
Tilapa Otomí language, Tilapa Otomí		Severely endangered		
Tipai language, Tipai		Severely endangered		
Tlachichilco Tepehua language, Tlachichilco Tepehua		Definitely endangered		
Tlahuica language, Tlahuica		Severely endangered		
Tuzantec language, Tuzantec		Critically endangered		
Valle Nacional Chinantec language, Valle Nacional Chinantec		Definitely endangered		
Western Chocho language, Western Chocho		Severely endangered		
Western Mazahua language, Western Mazahua		Definitely endangered		
Western Mazatec language, Western Mazatec		Vulnerable		
Western Náhuatl language, Western Náhuatl		Severely endangered		
Western Otomí language, Western Otomí		Severely endangered		
Western Popoloc language, Western Popoloc		Severely endangered		
Western Tarahumara language, Western Tarahumara		Vulnerable		
Western Tlapanec language, Western Tlapanec		Vulnerable		
Western Zoque language, Western Zoque		Vulnerable		
Yaqui language, Yaqui		Vulnerable		
Zapotec of Asunción Tlacolulita language, Zapotec of Asunción Tlacolulita		Critically endangered		
Zapotec of Mixtepe language, Zapotec of Mixtepe		Critically endangered		
Zapotec of Petapa language, Zapotec of Petapa		Definitely endangered		
Zapotec of San Antonino el Alto language, Zapotec of San Antonino el Alto		Definitely endangered		
Zapotec of San Bartolo Yautepec language, Zapotec of San Bartolo Yautepec		Severely endangered		
Zapotec of San Felipe Tejalapan language, Zapotec of San Felipe Tejalapan		Critically endangered		
eastern lowlands Zapotec of the Southern mountains		Definitely endangered		
northeast Zapotec of the Southern mountains		Definitely endangered		
northwest lowlands Zapotec of the Southern mountains		Definitely endangered		
north Zapotec of the Valleys		Severely endangered		
central Zapotec of the Valleys		Severely endangered		
middle northwest Zapotec of the Valleys		Definitely endangered		
west Zapotec of the Valleys		Definitely endangered		
Zapotec of Zimatlán de Álvarez language, Zapotec of Zimatlán de Álvarez		Definitely endangered		

== Number of speakers ==
Indigenous languages of Mexico in 2005
Language	Speakers
Nahuatl (Nahualt, Nahuat, Nahual, Melatahtol)	1,376,026
Yucatec Maya (Maaya tʼaan)	759,000
Mixtec (Tuʼun sávi)	423,216
Zapotec (Diidxaza/Dizhsa)	410,901
Tzeltal Maya (Kʼop o winik atel)	371,730
Tzotzil Maya (Batsil kʼop)	329,937
Otomí (Hñä hñü)	239,850
Totonac (Tachihuiin)	230,930
Mazatec (Ha shuta enima)	206,559
Chʼol (Mayan) (Winik)	185,299
Huastec (Téenek)	149,532
Chinantec (Tsa jujmí)	125,706
Mixe (Ayüük)	115,824
Mazahua (Jñatho)	111,840
Purépecha (Pʼurhépecha)	105,556
Tlapanec (Meꞌphaa)	98,573
Tarahumara (Rarámuri)	75,371
Amuzgo (Tzañcue)	43,761
Chatino (Chaʼcña)	42,791
Tojolabʼal (Tojolwinik otik)	43,169
Popoluca (Zoquean) (Tuncápxe)	54,004
Chontal de Tabasco (Yokot tʼan)	43,850
Huichol (Wixárika)	35,724
Mayo (Yoreme)	32,702
Tepehuán (Oʼdam)	31,681
Trique (Tinujéi)	24,491
Cora (Naáyarite)	17,086
Popoloca (Oto-manguean)	18,926
Huave (Ikoods)	15,993
Cuicatec (Nduudu yu)	12,610
Yaqui (Yoem Noki or Hiak Nokpo)	14,162
Qʼanjobʼal	10,833
Tepehua (Hamasipini)	10,625
Pame (Xigüe)	9,768
Mam (Qyool)	8,739
Chontal de Oaxaca (Slijuala sihanuk)	5,534
Chuj	2,143
Tacuate (Mixtec de Santa María Zacatepec) (Tuʼun Vaʼa)	2,067
Chichimeca jonaz (Úza)	1,987
Guarijío (Warihó)	1,905
Chocho (Runixa ngiigua)	1,078
Pima Bajo (Oob Noʼok)	836
Qʼeqchiʼ	835
Lacandón (Hach tʼan)	731
Jakaltek (Poptí) (Abxubal)	584
Matlatzinca/Ocuilteco (Tlahuica)	522
Seri (Cmiique iitom)	518
Ixcatec	406
Kʼicheʼ	286
Kaqchikel	230
Paipai (Jaspuy pai)	221
Cucapá (Kuapá)	206
Mototzintleco (Qatok)	186
Kumiai (Tiʼpai)	185
Pápago (Oʼodham)	153
Kikapú (Kikapoa)	144
Ixil	108
Cochimí (Laymón, mtiʼpá)	96
Kiliwa language (Koʼlew)	55
Aguacatec	27
Ayapenaco	21
Other languages ^{1}	337
^{1} Including: Òpata, Soltec, and Papabucan
Only includes population 5 and older. Source: INEGI (2005)

== See also ==
- Languages of Mexico
