= ISO 639:v =

List of ISO 639-3 language codes starting with V

This is a list of ISO 639-3 language codes starting with V.

Index | a | b | c | d | e | f | g | h | i | j | k | l | m | n | o | p | q | r | s | t | u | v | w | x | y | z

Abbreviations are used in the table as follows:

- Scope: I = individual language, M = macrolanguage, S = special code
- Type: C = constructed, E = extinct (in recent times), H = historical (distinct from its modern form), L = living, S = special code

Deprecated codes are enclosed in (parentheses).

The column Family contains the generic English name of the language's family or macrolanguage.

ISO 639 codes			Scope/Type	Family	Language names	
639-3	639-1	639-2/B	Scope/Type	Family	Native	ISO name
vaa			I/L			Vaagri Booli
vae			I/L			Vale
vaf			I/L			Vafsi
vag			I/L			Vagla
vah			I/L			Varhadi-Nagpuri
vai		vai	I/L			Vai
vaj			I/L			Northwestern ǃKung; Sekele; Vasekele
val			I/L			Vehes
vam			I/L			Vanimo
van			I/L			Valman
vao			I/L			Vao
vap			I/L			Vaiphei
var			I/L			Huarijio
vas			I/L			Vasavi
vau			I/L			Vanuma
vav			I/L			Varli
vay			I/L	Sino-Tibetan	वायु	Wayu
vbb			I/L			Southeast Babar
vbk			I/L			Southwestern Bontok
vec			I/L	Indo-European	veneto	Venetian
ved			I/L			Veddah
vel			I/L			Veluws
vem			I/L			Vemgo-Mabas
ven	ve	ven	I/L	Niger–Congo	Tshivenḓa	Venda
veo			I/E			Ventureño
vep			I/L		vepsä	Veps
ver			I/L			Mom Jango
vgr			I/L			Vaghri
vgt			I/L	French Sign?		Vlaamse Gebarentaal; Flemish Sign Language
vic			I/L			Virgin Islands Creole English
vid			I/L			Vidunda
vie	vi	vie	I/L	Austroasiatic	tiếng Việt	Vietnamese
vif			I/L			Vili
vig			I/L			Viemo
vil			I/L			Vilela
vin			I/L			Vinza
vis			I/L			Vishavan
vit			I/L			Viti
viv			I/L			Iduna
vjk			I/L	Indo-European		Bajjika
vka			I/E			Kariyarra
(vki)			I/L			Ija-Zuba
vkj			I/L	unclassified, maybe Chadic / Cushitic / isolate		Kujarge
vkk			I/L			Kaur
vkl			I/L			Kulisusu
vkm			I/E			Kamakan
vkn			I/L	Niger–Congo		Koro Nulu
vko			I/L			Kodeoha
vkp			I/L			Korlai Creole Portuguese
vkt			I/L			Tenggarong Kutai Malay
vku			I/L			Kurrama
(vky)			I/L			Kayu Agung
vkz			I/L	Niger–Congo		Koro Zuba
vlp			I/L			Valpei
(vlr)			I/L			Vatrata
vls			I/L		West-Vlams	Vlaams
vma			I/E			Martuyhunira
vmb			I/E			Barbaram
vmc			I/L			Juxtlahuaca Mixtec
vmd			I/L			Mudu Koraga
vme			I/L			East Masela
vmf			I/L			Mainfränkisch
vmg			I/L			Lungalunga
vmh			I/L			Maraghei
vmi			I/E			Miwa
vmj			I/L			Ixtayutla Mixtec
vmk			I/L			Makhuwa-Shirima
vml			I/E			Malgana
vmm			I/L			Mitlatongo Mixtec
(vmo)			I/L			Muko-Muko
vmp			I/L			Soyaltepec Mazatec
vmq			I/L			Soyaltepec Mixtec
vmr			I/L			Marenje
vms			I/E	Austronesian		Moksela
vmu			I/E			Muluridyi
vmv			I/E			Valley Maidu
vmw			I/L			Makhuwa
vmx			I/L			Tamazola Mixtec
vmy			I/L			Ayautla Mazatec
vmz			I/L			Mazatlán Mazatec
vnk			I/L			Lovono; Vano
vnm			I/L			Neve'ei; Vinmavis
vnp			I/L			Vunapu
vol	vo	vol	I/C	constructed	volapük	Volapük
vor			I/L		Voro <! --Nigeria-->	Voro
vot		vot	I/L		vaďďa	Votic
vra			I/L			Vera'a
vro			I/L		võro	Võro
vrs			I/L			Varisi
vrt			I/L			Banam Bay; Burmbar
vsi			I/L	French Sign		Moldova Sign Language
vsl			I/L			Venezuelan Sign Language
vsn			I/H	Indo-European		Vedic Sanskrit
vsv			I/L	maybe French Sign	Llengua de signes valenciana	Valencian Sign Language; Llengua de signes valenciana
vto			I/L			Vitou
vum			I/L			Vumbu
vun			I/L			Vunjo
vut			I/L			Vute
vwa			I/L			Awa (China)

== Sources ==
- "ISO 639-2 Registration Authority". Library of Congress.
- "ISO 639-3 Registration Authority". SIL International.
- Lewis, M. Paul; Simons, Gary F.; Fennig, Charles D., eds. (2016). "Ethnologue: Languages of the World" (19th ed.). Dallas, Texas: SIL International.
