= Ixpantepec Nieves Mixtec =

Variety of Mixtec language

- Tu̱ʼun ndáʼví
- Pronunciation: [ˌtṵ̃˩ũ˧ˈⁿdaʔ˥vi˥]
- Region: Ixpantepec Nieves, Oaxaca, Mexico and San Diego County, California, United States
- Ethnicity: Mixtecs
- Language family: Oto-Manguean: Mixtecan; Mixtec; Ixpantepec Nieves Mixtec
- Writing system: Latin

Language codes
- ISO 639-3: –

Ixpantepec Nieves Mixtec, or simply Nieves Mixtec, is a variety of Mixtec spoken in the municipality of Ixpantepec Nieves, Oaxaca, Mexico and in San Diego County, California, United States.

== Classification ==
INALI classifies Nieves Mixtec as part of Upper Western Mixtec (Spanish: mixteco del oeste alto). J. Kathryn Josserand classified it as part of Southern Baja Mixtec. SIL grouped Nieves Mixtec with Silacayoapan Mixtec, and found that speakers of Nieves Mixtec could understand 94% of Silacayoapan Mixtec, 75% of Juxtlahuaca Mixtec, 56% of Mixtepec Mixtec and 46% of Cacaloxtepec Mixtec.

== Phonology ==
=== Consonants ===
		Labial	Coronal			Dorsal	
		Labial	Apico- alveolar	Lamino- alveolar	Post- alveolar		Labialized
Voiceless	Stop		t	tʲ	tʃ	k	kʷ
Voiceless	Continuant		s		ʃ	x	
Voiced	Stop	(ᵐb)	ⁿd	ⁿdʲ		(ᵑɡ)	
Voiced	Continuant	v	l		ʒ		
Voiced	Nasal	m	n		ɲ		

- The voiceless stops /t tʲ k/ lenite lenite in prosodically weak positions: /t/ becomes [d] or [ð], /tʲ/ becomes [ɾ], and /k/ becomes [ɡ] or [ɣ].
- /x/ may be realized as [h].
- /v/ may be realized as [β] or [β̞].
- /ʒ/ may be realized as [j].
- /ᵐb/ and /ᵑɡ/ are found in only a small number of words, including loanwords.
- /ɲ/ may be realized as [j̃] in unstressed syllables.
- Spanish consonants such as /p f b d ɾ r/ are found in loanwords. /r/ is also found in two animal names.

=== Vowels ===
	Oral			Nasal		
	Front	Central	Back	Front	Central	Back
+High	ii		uu	ĩĩ		ũũ
+High	i		u	ĩ		ũ
−High	ee	aa	oo	ẽẽ	ãã	
−High	e	a	o		ã	
