= Zacatepec Mixtec =

Mixtec language of Mexico

- (Santa María Zacatepec)
- tu’unsavi
- Native to: Mexico
- Region: Oaxaca
- Ethnicity: Tacuate
- Native speakers: 1,500 (2010 census)
- Language family: Oto-Manguean: Mixtecan; Mixtec; Chayuco–Zacatepec; Zacatepec Mixtec

Language codes
- ISO 639-3: mza
- Glottolog: sant1436
- ELP: Coast Mixtec (shared)

Zacatepec Mixtec, or Tacuate, is a Mixtec language of Oaxaca. It is spoken in the town of Santa María Zacatepec and other towns in Oaxaca, Mexico.

It has 64% intelligibility of Ixtayutla Mixtec, 63% of Pinotepa Mixtec, 40%–50% of Metlatónoc [mxv], 25%–30% of Yoloxóchitl Mixtec.
