= Chayuco-Jamiltepec Mixtec =

Mixtec language of Oaxaca, Mexico

- Cristobál-Chayuco
- Native to: Mexico
- Region: Oaxaca
- Native speakers: (20,000 cited 1990–2000)
- Language family: Oto-Manguean: Mixtecan; Mixtec; Chayuco–Zacatepec; Chayuco-Jamiltepec Mixtec

Language codes
- ISO 639-3: Either: mxt – Jamiltepec mih – Chayuco
- Glottolog: chay1249 Chayuco jami1235 Jamiltepec
- ELP: Coast Mixtec (shared)

Chayuco-Jamiltepec Mixtec is a Mixtec language of Oaxaca, spoken in the towns of San Agustín Chayuco, Santa Catarina Mechoacán, Santiago Jamiltepec, San Andrés Huaxpaltepec, Santa María Huazolotitlán, Santiago Tetepec, and Santa Elena Comaltepec.
