= Nuyoo Mixtec =

Mixtec language of Oaxaca, Mexico

- (Santiago Nuyoo); Southwestern Tlaxiaco Mixtec
- Native to: Mexico
- Region: Oaxaca
- Native speakers: (7,300 cited 2000 census)
- Language family: Oto-Manguean: Mixtecan; Mixtec; Nuyoo Mixtec
- Dialects: Santiago Nuyoo Santiago; Santa María Yucuhiti

Language codes
- ISO 639-3: meh
- Glottolog: sout3000

A speaker of Nuyoo Mixtec.

Nuyoo Mixtec, also known as Southwestern Tlaxiaco Mixtec, is a Mixtec language of Oaxaca. It is not close to other varieties of Mixtec, but its greatest degree of intelligibility is with Atatláhuca Mixtec.
