= Cuatzoquitengo Mixtec =

Possible Mixtec language of Mexico

- Native to: Mexico
- Region: Guerrero
- Language family: Oto-Manguean: Mixtecan; Mixtec; Cuatzoquitengo Mixtec

Language codes
- ISO 639-3: (subsumed under Alacatlatzala Mixtec [mim])
- Glottolog: cuat1239

Cuatzoquitengo Mixtec is a possible Mixtec language of Guerrero.

Ethnologue counts Cuatzoquitengo Mixtec as a dialect of Alacatlatzala Mixtec. However, Egland & Bartholomew found it to have only 55% intelligible with the Cahuatache dialect of Alacatlatzala, the only variety of Mixtec it was compared to.
