= Peñasco Mixtec =

Mixtec language of Oaxaca, Mexico

- (Santa María Magdalena Peñasco); Tlacotepec Mixtec
- Native to: Mexico
- Region: Oaxaca
- Native speakers: 7,400 (2005 census); 1,200 monolinguals (2000 census)
- Language family: Oto-Manguean: Mixtecan; Mixtec; Ñumí–Tlacotepec ?; Peñasco Mixtec

Language codes
- ISO 639-3: xtm
- Glottolog: magd1235

(Magdalena) Peñasco Mixtec, also known as Tlacotepec Mixtec, is a Mixtec language of Oaxaca spoken in the towns of Santa María Magdalena Peñasco, San Cristobal Amoltepec, San Mateo Peñasco, and San Agustín Tlacotepec. It has closer unidirectional intelligibility with other varieties, but may be closest to Ñumí Mixtec.
