= Pinotepa Mixtec =

Mixtec language of Oaxaca, Mexico

- Jicaltepec Mixtec; Coastal Mixtec
- Native to: Mexico
- Region: Oaxaca
- Native speakers: (ca. 30,000 cited 1990–2000)
- Language family: Oto-Manguean: Mixtecan; Mixtec; Pinotepa Mixtec

Language codes
- ISO 639-3: Either: mio – Pinotepa Nacional mjc – San Juan Colorado
- Glottolog: pino1237 Pinotepa Nacional sanj1281 San Juan Colorado
- ELP: Coast Mixtec (shared)

Pinotepa Mixtec is a Mixtec language of southern Oaxaca. Ethnologue lists the variety of San Juan Colorado / San Pedro Atoyac as a separate language.

Pinotepa Mixtec is spoken in a large number of towns: Pinotepa de Don Luis, San Antonio Tepetlapa, San Francisco Sayultepec, San Juan Atoyac, San Juan Jicayán, San Pedro Tulixtlahuaca, Santa Cruz Itacuán, Santa María Jicaltepec, San Antonio Tepetlapa, San Juan Cacahuatepec, San Miguel Tlacamama, San Pedro Jicayán, San Sebastian Ixcapa, Santiago Pinotepa Nacional, Tulixtlahuaca, San Juan Colorado, and San Pedro Atoyac.
