= Tututepec Mixtec =

Mixtec language of Oaxaca, Mexico

- (San Pedro Tututepec)
- Native to: Mexico
- Region: Oaxaca
- Ethnicity: 30,000 (1990 census)
- Native speakers: (1,020 cited 2000)
- Language family: Oto-Manguean: Mixtecan; Mixtec; Tututepec Mixtec

Language codes
- ISO 639-3: mtu
- Glottolog: tutu1243
- ELP: Coast Mixtec (shared)

Tututepec Mixtec is a Mixtec language of Oaxaca, spoken in Santa María Acatepec, Santa Cruz Tututepec, San Pedro Tututepec and other towns. It is not close to other varieties of Mixtec.

Ethnologue estimates 61% intelligibility of Ixtayutla Mixtec, and 50% of Pinotepa Mixtec.
