= Pinotepa =

Pinotepa may refer to:

== Languages ==
- Pinotepa Mixtec, a Mixtec language of southern Oaxaca

== Places ==
Mexico:
- Pinotepa Nacional, Oaxaca
- Pinotepa de Don Luis, Oaxaca
