= Apoala Mixtec =

Mixtec language of Oaxaca, Mexico

- Apasco-Apoala Mixtec (Santiago Apoala, Santa María Apasco)
- Native to: Mexico
- Region: Oaxaca
- Native speakers: (10,000 cited 1990)
- Language family: Oto-Manguean: Mixtecan; Mixtec; Apoala Mixtec

Language codes
- ISO 639-3: mip
- Glottolog: apas1235
- ELP: Northeastern Alta Mixtec (shared)

Apoala Mixtec is a Mixtec language of Oaxaca. It is not close to other varieties of Mixtec.
