= Cuyamecalco Mixtec =

Mixtec language of Oaxaca, Mexico

- Cuicatlán Mixtec
- Native to: Mexico
- Region: Cuicatlán, Oaxaca
- Native speakers: (1,900 cited 2000)
- Language family: Oto-Manguean: Mixtecan; Mixtec; Coatzospan–Cuyamecalco; Cuyamecalco Mixtec
- Dialects: Santa Ana Cuauhtémoc

Language codes
- ISO 639-3: xtu
- Glottolog: cuya1240
- ELP: Northern Alta Mixtec (shared)

Cuyamecalco Mixtec is a Mixtec language of Oaxaca spoken in Cuyamecalco, San Miguel Santa Flor, and Santa Ana Cuauhtémoc. Egland & Bartholomew had found Cuauhtémoc to be more intelligible with Coatzospan Mixtec, which in any case is close to Cuyamecalco.
