= Cacaloxtepec Mixtec =

Mixtec language of Oaxaca, Mexico

- (Santiago Cacaloxtepec); Huajuapan Mixtec
- Native to: Mexico
- Region: Oaxaca
- Ethnicity: 1,250 in the town (1990 census?)
- Native speakers: 460 (2005)
- Language family: Oto-Manguean: Mixtecan; Mixtec; Silacayoapan–Cacaloxtepec; Cacaloxtepec Mixtec

Language codes
- ISO 639-3: miu
- Glottolog: caca1250

Cacaloxtepec Mixtec, also Huajuapan Mixtec, is a Mixtec language spoken in the town of Santiago Cacaloxtepec in Oaxaca, Mexico. It is most intelligible with Silacayoapan Mixtec.
