= Sindihui Mixtec =

Mixtec language of Oaxaca, Mexico

- (Santa Maria Sindihui)
- Native to: Mexico
- Region: Oaxaca
- Native speakers: 34 (2005 census)
- Language family: Oto-Manguean: Mixtecan; Mixtec; Sindihui Mixtec

Language codes
- ISO 639-3: xts
- Glottolog: sind1277

Sindihui Mixtec is a nearly extinct Mixtec language spoken in the town of Santa Maria Sindihui in Oaxaca. It is not close to other varieties of Mixtec. It is only spoken by older adults.
