= Tacuate =

Indigenous ethnic group in Oaxaca, Mexico

The Tacuate are an Indigenous people of Mexico who live in the state of Oaxaca. The Tacuate language is one of the Mixtec languages; in 2010, there were 1,500 speakers.

Most of the people are engaged in subsistence agriculture, with some keeping cattle and goats, and with women producing textile crafts for a source of cash. Land tenure is usually communal. The Tacuate live in two municipalities in the Mixteca de la Costa area: Santa María Zacatepec in the Putla district and Santiago Ixtayutla in the Jamiltepec district.

== See also ==
- Indigenous people of Oaxaca
