= Tilantongo Mixtec =

Mixtec language of Oaxaca, Mexico

- Diuxi-Tilantongo Mixtec
- Native to: Mexico
- Region: Oaxaca
- Native speakers: (3,400 cited 2000)
- Language family: Oto-Manguean: Mixtecan; Mixtec; Tilantongo Mixtec

Language codes
- ISO 639-3: xtd
- Glottolog: diux1235

Tilantongo (Diuxi-Tilantongo) Mixtec is a Mixtec language of Oaxaca. It is not close to other varieties of Mixtec. Numbers are declining due to emigration to the United States.

It is also called Central Nochistlán Mixtec, Diuxi-Tilantongo Mixtec, Mixteco de Diuxi-Tilantongo, and Mixteco del Este Central.
