= Tamazola =

Tamazola may refer to:

- Santiago Tamazola
- San Juan Tamazola
- Tamazola Mixtec language
