= Yucunicoco Mixtec =

Mixtec language of Oaxaca, Mexico

- (Santa María Yucunicoco)
- Native to: Mexico
- Region: Oaxaca
- Language family: Oto-Manguean: Mixtecan; Mixtec; Yucunicoco Mixtec

Language codes
- ISO 639-3: (subsumed under vmc)
- Glottolog: yucu1254

Yucunicoco Mixtec is a Mixtec language of Oaxaca.

Egland & Bartholomew found Yucunicoco to have only 50% intelligibility with Juxtlahuaca Mixtec. Comprehension of Mixtepec Mixtec is 85%, but in the other direction only 45%.
