= Southern Puebla Mixtec =

Mixtec language of Puebla and Oaxaca, Mexico

- Acatlán Mixtec
- Pronunciation: [ðãʔã ðaβi]
- Native to: Mexico
- Region: Puebla
- Native speakers: 3,200 (2010)
- Language family: Oto-Manguean: Mixtecan; Mixtec; Chazumba–Xayacatlán; Southern Puebla Mixtec

Language codes
- ISO 639-3: mit
- Glottolog: sout3001
- ELP: Northern Baja Mixtec (shared)

Southern Puebla Mixtec, denominated by INALI as Puebla-Oaxaca borderline Mixtec, and also known as Acatlán Mixtec, is a Mixtec language of Puebla and Oaxaca State in Mexico. It is spoken in the towns of Acatlán, Xayacatlán de Bravo, San Jerónimo Xayacatlán, Petlalcingo (which it shares with Chazumba Mixtec), and Zapotitlán Palmas.
