= Nuxaá Mixtec =

Mixtec language of Oaxaca, Mexico

- (Santo Domingo Nuxaá); Southeastern Nochixtlán Mixtec
- Native to: Mexico
- Region: Oaxaca
- Native speakers: (4,200 cited 2000)
- Language family: Oto-Manguean: Mixtecan; Mixtec; Nuxaá Mixtec

Language codes
- ISO 639-3: mxy
- Glottolog: sout3002

Nuxaá Mixtec, also known as Southeastern Nochixtlán Mixtec, is a Mixtec language of Oaxaca, dissimilar to other Mixtec languages.
