= Chazumba Mixtec =

Mixtec language of Mexico

- (Santiago Chazumba)
- Native to: Mexico
- Region: Puebla–Oaxaca border
- Native speakers: (3,800 cited 2000)
- Language family: Oto-Manguean: Mixtecan; Mixtec; Chazumba–Xayacatlán; Chazumba Mixtec

Language codes
- ISO 639-3: xtb
- Glottolog: chaz1235
- ELP: Northern Baja Mixtec (shared)

Chazumba Mixtec is a Mixtec language of Puebla and Oaxaca, spoken in the towns of Santiago Chazumba, San Pedro y San Pablo Tequixtepec, Zapotitlán, Santa Gertrudis Cosoltepec, Petlalcingo (which it shares with Southern Puebla Mixtec), and Totoltepec de Guerrero.
