= Ixtayutla Mixtec =

Mixtec language of Oaxaca, Mexico

- (Santiago Ixtayutla)
- Native to: Mexico
- Region: Oaxaca
- Native speakers: (6,400 cited 2000)
- Language family: Oto-Manguean: Mixtecan; Mixtec; Chayuco–Zacatepec; Ixtayutla Mixtec

Language codes
- ISO 639-3: vmj
- Glottolog: ixta1235
- ELP: Coast Mixtec (shared)

Ixtayutla Mixtec is a Mixtec language of Oaxaca. It is close to Chayuco and Zacatepec Mixtec.
