= Amoltepec =

Amoltepec may refer to:

- San Cristóbal Amoltepec, Oaxaca
- Santiago Amoltepec, Oaxaca
- Amoltepec Mixtec language
