= Ayutla Mixtec =

Mixtec language of Guerrero, Mexico

- Coastal Guerrero Mixtec
- Native to: Mexico
- Region: Guerrero
- Native speakers: (12,000 cited 2000); 3,000 monolingual
- Language family: Oto-Manguean: Mixtecan; Mixtec; Ayutla Mixtec

Language codes
- ISO 639-3: miy
- Glottolog: ayut1236
- ELP: Southern Baja Mixtec (shared)

Ayutla Mixtec is a Mixtec language of Guerrero. It's divergent, with a number of words unlike other varieties of Mixtec. It is spoken mainly by people living in the outlying settlements of Ayutla de los Libres, Guerrero.
