= Chigmecatitlán Mixtec =

Mixtec language of Puebla, Mexico

- (Santa María Chigmecatitlán; Santa Catarina Tlaltempan)
- dehe dau
- Native to: Mexico
- Region: Puebla
- Native speakers: 1,400 (2010) some monolingual
- Language family: Oto-Manguean: Mixtecan; Mixtec; Chigmecatitlán Mixtec

Language codes
- ISO 639-3: mii
- Glottolog: chig1239
- ELP: Northern Baja Mixtec (shared)

Chigmecatitlán Mixtec (also known as Southeast Puebla Mixtec, or dehe dau ['rain language'] by its speakers) is a Mixtec language of Puebla, Mexico, spoken in the municipalities of Chigmecatitlán and Acatlán de Osorio. This language is also known as Central Puebla Mixtec, Chigmecatitlán Mixtec, Mixteco de la Frontera Puebla-Oaxaca, and Mixteco de Santa María Chigmecatitlán.

Although classified as a 'vigorous' language by Ethnologue, UNESCO's Atlas of languages in danger considers it definitely threatened.

It is not close to other varieties of Mixtec.
