= Tidaá Mixtec =

Mixtec language of Oaxaca, Mexico

- (San Pedro Tidaá); North Central Nochixtlán Mixtec
- Native to: Mexico
- Region: Oaxaca
- Native speakers: (380 cited 2000)
- Language family: Oto-Manguean: Mixtecan; Mixtec; Tidaá Mixtec

Language codes
- ISO 639-3: mtx
- Glottolog: tida1235

Tidaá Mixtec is a moribund Mixtec language of Oaxaca. It is not close to other varieties of Mixtec.
