= MXS =

MXS or mxs may refer to:

- Huitepec Mixtec language (ISO 639-3: mxs), a Mixtec language of Oaxaca, Mexico
- Maota Airport (IATA: MXS), the main domestic airport on the island of Savai'i in Samoa
- MX Aircraft MXS, a single-seat aerobatic aircraft made of carbon fiber and built by MX Aircraft Company
