= San Pedro el Alto (agencia municipal) =

Town in Mexico

- agencia municipal
- Location within Mexico
- Coordinates: 17°08′58″N 97°27′37″W
- Country: Mexico
- State: Oaxaca
- Region: Mixteca
- District: Tlaxiaco
- Municipality: San Mateo Peñasco

Area
  - Total: 2,902.75 ha (7,172.9 acres)

Population (2010)
  - Total: 850

San Pedro el Alto (Mixtec: Yuku Kuiꞌi, IPA: [ʒuku kʷiʔi]) is an agencia municipal of the municipality of San Mateo Peñasco, Oaxaca, Mexico.

== Name ==
In the local Mixtec language, San Pedro el Alto is called Yuku Kuiꞌi (IPA: [ʒuku kʷiʔi]; historically spelled Yucucuihi), meaning "hill of fruit". In Mixtec writing, it was represented by "a hill containing a plant of some type, perhaps with the implication that it is a fruit-bearing plant".

It was formerly known in Spanish as Tlazultepec or Tlatzultepec. The name San Pedro el Alto came into use by the early 18th century.

== History ==
The cacicazgo of San Pedro el Alto is the subject of a 16th-century manuscript called the Genealogy of Tlazultepec, currently kept in the Archivo General de la Nación. The Genealogy shows the relationships between the caciques of San Pedro el Alto (then known as Tlazultepec), other Mixtec lineages, and their descendants, and was presented in 1597 in litigation over the succession to the cacicazgo.

== Demographics ==
The majority of the population of San Pedro el Alto are indigenous Mixtecs, and speak a variety of Mixtec. Although San Pedro el Alto is part of the municipality of San Mateo Peñasco, the form of Mixtec spoken in San Pedro el Alto is different from that of San Mateo Peñasco, and may be more similar to the Mixtec of Santa María Yosoyúa.
