= San Miguel Piedras Mixtec =

Mixtec language of Oaxaca, Mexico

- Native to: Mexico
- Region: Oaxaca
- Ethnicity: 1,120 (1990 census)
- Native speakers: (460 cited 2000)
- Language family: Oto-Manguean: Mixtecan; Mixtec; San Miguel Piedras Mixtec

Language codes
- ISO 639-3: xtp
- Glottolog: sanm1294

San Miguel Piedras Mixtec is a moribund Mixtec language of Oaxaca. It is not close to other varieties of Mixtec.
