= MBZ =

MBZ, mbz, or MbZ may refer to:

- mbz, the ISO 639-3 code for Amoltepec Mixtec
- MBZ, the IATA code for Maués Airport in Maués, Brazil
- Mebendazole, a medication used to treat parasitic worm infestations
- Mercedes-Benz, a division of automotive manufacturer Daimler AG
- Mohamed bin Zayed Al Nahyan, third president of the United Arab Emirates and ruler of Abu Dhabi since 2022
- Music Biennale Zagreb, an international music festival in Zagreb, Croatia
- Sheikh Mohammed bin Zayed Skyway, an elevated expressway in West Java, Indonesia
