= XTN =

XTN or xtn may refer to:

- Xintian County, the administrative division code
- Naval Aircraft Factory XTN, a prototype of the Douglas T2D
- xtn, the ISO 639-3 code for Northern Tlaxiaco, a variant of Ñumí Mixtec
