= Mitlatongo-Yutanduchi Mixtec =

Mixtec language of southern Oaxaca

- Native to: Mexico
- Region: Oaxaca
- Native speakers: (2,800 cited 2000–2011)
- Language family: Oto-Manguean: Mixtecan; Mixtec; Mitlatongo-Yutanduchi Mixtec

Language codes
- ISO 639-3: Either: vmm – Mitlatongo mab – Yutanduchi
- Glottolog: mitl1235 Mitlatongo yuta1240 Yutanduchi
- ELP: Eastern Alta Mixtec (shared)

Mitlatongo-Yutanduchi Mixtec is a Mixtec language of southern Oaxaca. The two varieties, Mitlatongo (Santiago Mitlatongo & Santa Cruz Mitlatongo) and Yutanduchi (Yutanduchi de Guerrero), are quite distinct, with about 70% intelligibility.
