= Atoyac =

Atoyac (Nahuatl: "place by the river") may refer to any of the following locations in Mexico:

- Atoyac, Jalisco
- Atoyac, Veracruz
- Atoyac de Álvarez, Guerrero
- San Pedro Atoyac, Oaxaca
- A stretch of the Río Balsas is known as the Río Atoyac
