= Academy of the Mixtec Language =

The Academy of the Mixtec Language (Mixtec: Ve'e Tu'un Sávi, meaning "House of the Language of the Rain"; Spanish: Academia de la Lengua Mixteca) was founded in 1997 by a group of indigenous activists from the Mixtec people, with the aim of creating mechanisms for the preservation and usage promotion of the Mixtecan languages, their indigenous languages.

It has its headquarters in the city of Tlaxiaco, in the heart of the Mixteca region of the Mexican state of Oaxaca.

Among other undertakings, it has worked with the federal Secretariat of Public Education on designing the writing system used for Mixtec language instruction for children belonging to this ethnic group. It has also sponsored gatherings of indigenous writers and maintains cooperative ties with various other bodies in Mexico, the United States, and other parts of the world. One such organization, the Frente Indígena de Organizaciones Binacionales (FIOB) has a radio station that broadcasts in Mixtec in the U.S. state of California.
