= MIY =

MIY may refer to:

- Mersin İdman Yurdu or Mersin İdmanyurdu SK, a Turkish sports club
- Мы or We, a dystopian novel by Yevgeny Zamyatin completed in 1921
- The ISO 639-3 code of Ayutla Mixtec language
- MuniYield Michigan Insured Fund, Inc., a company listed on the New York Stock Exchange
