= Yoloxóchitl Mixtec =

Mixtec language of Guerrero, Mexico

- Native to: Mexico
- Region: Guerrero
- Native speakers: (10,600 cited 2000)
- Language family: Oto-Manguean: Mixtecan; Mixtec; Yoloxóchitl Mixtec

Language codes
- ISO 639-3: xty
- Glottolog: yolo1241
- ELP: Southern Mixtec

Yoloxóchitl Mixtec is a Mixtec language of Guerrero. It is not close to other varieties of Mixtec.

== Resources ==
- Yoloxóchitl Mixtec Language Documentation Project of Jonathan Amith and Rey Castillo - Archive of audio recordings and text transcriptions of Yoloxóchitl Mixtec from native speakers from the Archive of the Indigenous Language of Latin America.
