= Ñumí Mixtec =

Mixtec language of Oaxaca, Mexico

- Native to: Mexico
- Region: Oaxaca
- Native speakers: (19,000 cited 2000)
- Language family: Oto-Manguean: Mixtecan; Mixtec; Ñumí–Tlacotepec ?; Ñumí Mixtec

Language codes
- ISO 639-3: Variously: xtn – Northern Tlaxiaco mie – Ocotepec mvg – Yucuañe
- Glottolog: ocot1243 Ocotepec yucu1250 Yucuane nort2985 Northern Tlaxiaco
- ELP: Western Alta Mixtec (shared)

Ñumí Mixtec is a diverse Mixtec language of Oaxaca. It may be closest to Peñasco Mixtec.

== Dialects ==
Egland & Bartholomew found four dialects which have ca. 80% mutual intelligibility with each other, spoken in the following towns:

- (San Juan) Ñumí, (Santiago) Nunduchi, (San Sebastián) Nicananduta
- (San Antonio) Monteverde
- (Santo Tomás) Ocotepec
- (San Bartolomé) Yucuañe

Yucuañe is no longer being passed on to children.
