= Soyaltepec Mixtec =

Mixtec language of Oaxaca, Mexico

- (San Bartolo Soyaltepec)
- Native to: Mexico
- Region: Oaxaca
- Ethnicity: 930 (1990 census)
- Native speakers: (220 cited 2000)
- Language family: Oto-Manguean: Mixtecan; Mixtec; Soyaltepec Mixtec

Language codes
- ISO 639-3: vmq
- Glottolog: soya1236
- ELP: Northeastern Alta Mixtec (shared)

Soyaltepec Mixtec is a moribund Mixtec language of Oaxaca spoken in the villages of San Bartolo Soyaltepec and Guadalupe Gabilera. It is not close to other varieties of Mixtec.
