= Santiago Jamiltepec =

Santiago Jamiltepec Casandoo
- Municipality and town
- Location within Mexico
- Coordinates: 16°17′N 97°49′W
- Country: Mexico
- State: Oaxaca
- Municipal seat: Santiago Jamiltepec

Area
  - Total: 622.6 km^{2} (240.4 sq mi)

Population (2005)
  - Total: 17,206
  - Density: 27.64/km^{2} (71.58/sq mi)
- (municipality)
- Time zone: UTC-6 (CST)
- Area code: 954
- Fiestas: 1 January, 15 February, 1 September

Santiago Jamiltepec (Mixtec: Casandoo, San Juan Quiahije Chatino: Neqᶜ-Xtyuᶠ) is a town, and the seat of surrounding municipality of the same name, in the Mexican state of Oaxaca. It is located in the Jamiltepec District in the west of the Costa Chica Region, 30 km east of Pinotepa Nacional on Federal Highway 200, and 460 km southwest of state capital Oaxaca de Juárez.

== The municipality ==
In the 2005 INEGI census, the municipality reported a population of 17,206 inhabitants, of whom 4,155 spoke an indigenous language, predominantly Mixtec.

As municipal seat, Santiago Jamiltepec has governing jurisdiction over the following communities: Atotonilquillo Charco Nduayoo Cuyuche, El Añil, El Guayabo, El Guineo, El Platanillo, El Santo, El Zapote Negro, El Zarzal, Emiliano Zapata (Chiapas), Espiga Verde, Finca la Natividad, La Comunal, La Esperanza, La Fábrica, La Huichicata, La Humedad, La Palmera, La Tuza, Las Palmitas, Los Cerreros, Nandayo, Parcela de Producción INI, Paso de la Reina, Patria Nueva, Piedra Ancha, Piedra Blanca, Plan de los Amates, Rancho la Isla, Rancho San Antonio, Río Viejo, San José de las Flores, San José Río Verde (La Boquilla), San Miguel de los Pinos, Santa Cruz Flores Magón, Santa Elena Comaltepec, and Unión Linda Vista.
