= Amoltepec Mixtec =

Mixtec language of Oaxaca, Mexico

- (Santiago Amoltepec); Western Sola de Vega Mixtec
- Native to: Mexico
- Region: Oaxaca
- Ethnicity: 12,000 (2007?)
- Native speakers: (5,600 cited 2000)
- Language family: Oto-Manguean: Mixtecan; Mixtec; Amoltepec Mixtec

Language codes
- ISO 639-3: mbz
- Glottolog: amol1236
- ELP: Coast Mixtec (shared)

Amoltepec Mixtec is a Mixtec language of Oaxaca. It is not close to other varieties of Mixtec.
