= Laguna de Corralero =

Coordinates: 16°13′N 98°07′W

The Laguna de Corralero is a lagoon separated from the Pacific Ocean by a near-virgin beach that is also called Corralero. It is located in the State of Oaxaca in the municipality of Santiago Pinotepa Nacional, 27 km (17 mi) south of the municipal seat, (98.12.05 W / 16.11 to 16.15 N) with an extension of 31.58 km^{2} (12.19 sq mi) of surface water. 150 km² of landscapes surround the lagoon, and it is good for fishing and birdwatching.

Next to the lagoon is the village of Corralero, with only 5 meters above sea level and 1,301 inhabitants.
