= Atatláhuca–San Miguel Mixtec =

Mixtec language of Oaxaca, Mexico

- Native to: Mexico
- Region: Oaxaca, Guerrero
- Native speakers: (28,000 cited 1995–2010)
- Language family: Oto-Manguean: Mixtecan; Mixtec; Atatláhuca–San Miguel Mixtec

Language codes
- ISO 639-3: Variously: mib – Atatláhuca mdv – Santa Lucía Monteverde mce – Itundujía mpm – Yosondúa mig – San Miguel el Grande xtj – San Juan Teita xtl – Tijaltepec xti – Sinicahua xtt – Tacahua (Yolotepec)
- Glottolog: west2824 partial match
- ELP: Western Alta Mixtec

Atatláhuca–San Miguel Mixtec is a diverse Mixtec language of Oaxaca.

== Dialects ==
Egland & Bartholomew found six dialects (with > ≈80% internal intelligibility) which had about 70% mutual intelligibility with each other:

- San Esteban Atatláhuca [mib] + Santa Lucía Monteverde [mdv]
- Molinos
- Itundujía [mce]
- Yosondúa [mpm] + San Miguel el Grande + Chalcatongo [mig]
- Yolotepec [xtt]
- Teita [xtj]

Ethnologue notes that two additional varieties Egland & Bartholomew had not looked at, Sinicahua [xti] and Tijaltepec [xtl], are about as similar.
