= Francisco de Alvarado =

Fray Francisco de Alvarado was a native of Mexico, where he entered the Dominican order on 25 July 1574. He was vicar of Tamazulapa, Oaxaca in 1593.

Nothing more is known of him as yet, except that he wrote and published at Mexico, in 1593, a Vocabulario en Lengua Misteca, one of the languages of the present state of Oaxaca. In the same year, Fray Antonio de los Reyes, another Dominican, also published a grammar of that language, and at the same place. It is therefore impossible to determine to which work is due the honour of having been the first in and about the Mixtecan languages.
