= San Pedro Jocotipac =

- Municipality and town
- Location in Mexico
- Coordinates: 17°46′N 97°04′W
- Country: Mexico
- State: Oaxaca

Population (2005)
  - Total: 821
- Time zone: UTC-6 (Central Standard Time)

San Pedro Jocotipac is a town and municipality in Oaxaca in south-western Mexico. The municipality covers an area of 40.83 km^{2}. It is part of Cuicatlán District in the north of the Cañada Region.

As of 2005, the municipality had a total population of 821 people.
