= Tamazulápam del Progreso =

Tamazulapam del Progreso
- Municipality and town
- Location in Mexico
- Coordinates: 17°41′N 97°34′W
- Country: Mexico
- State: Oaxaca
- Time zone: UTC-6 (Central Standard Time)

Tamazulapam del Progreso is a town and municipality in Oaxaca, Mexico. It is located about 150 km (93 mi) from Oaxaca City, the state capital. In 2010, it had a population of 7,059.

It is part of the Teposcolula District in the center of the Mixteca Region.
