= Santa María Peñoles =

- Municipality and town
- Location in Mexico
- Coordinates: 17°05′N 97°00′W
- Country: Mexico
- State: Oaxaca

Area
  - Total: 181.17 km^{2} (69.95 sq mi)

Population (2005)
  - Total: 7,640
- Time zone: UTC-6 (Central Standard Time)

Santa María Peñoles is a town and municipality in Oaxaca in south-western Mexico. The municipality covers an area of 181.17 km^{2}. It is part of the Etla District in the Valles Centrales region. As of 2005, the municipality had a total population of 7,640 of whom 6,112 spoke an indigenous language.
