= Ixpantepec Nieves =

Ixpantepec Nieves San juan Yxpantepec
- Municipality and town
- Location in Mexico
- Coordinates: 17°30′27″N 98°02′37″W
- Country: Mexico
- State: Oaxaca

Area
  - Total: 93.14 km^{2} (35.96 sq mi)

Population (2005)
  - Total: 1,371
- Time zone: UTC-6 (Central Standard Time)

Ixpantepec Nieves is a town and municipality in Oaxaca in south-western Mexico. The municipality covers an area of 93.14 km^{2}. It is part of the Silacayoapam District in the Mixteca Region.

As of 2005, the municipality had a total population of 1,371.

== Etymology ==
The name Ixpantepec Nieves comes from two Nahuatl words, Ixpan which means at the front, or surface, and Tepetl which means hill. Those two words together mean " The surface hill, or the hill at the front".

== History ==
Ixpantepec Nieves was founded in 1800 during the time when pro-independence groups from all over the country were planning on striking against the Spanish king that ruled New Spain on that time. At first it was founded by no more than ten families that settled on the Yucuyia hill. Yacuyia means volcano hill and it is a native word as well as the name of the municipality.Today Ixpantepec Nieves is a lonely town because most of its population has migrated to other countries looking for a better way of life, this is due to the high unemployment rates and the scarce opportunities to get out of poverty.

== Economy ==
This town bases its economy on four basic economic activities which are: Agriculture, cattle raising, logging and commerce. Although there are four major economic activities, agriculture is the most important one, with 80 percent of the town's population working on it, some for self consumption and some for selling. Only 10 percent of the town's population raise cattle; this percentage is divided between cows, pork and sheep. The other ten percent of the population mainly relies on commerce to earn money to support their families; they sell hats and other products made out of palm tree leaves. Only a minimum percentage of the population work on logging, but that activity has been disappearing since the surrounding area of the town was declared protected zone in 2001. According to the National Institute of Geography and Statistics (INEGI), for its initials in Spanish, in 2000 the economically active population of Ixpantepec Nieves was around 258 persons. From those people, around 116 of them work on the primary economic sector including activities like agriculture, cattle raising, hunting and fishing. Other 57 people work on the secondary economic sector which includes mining, manufacturing, construction and oiling. The rest of the economically active population works on the tertiary economic sector which consists of tourism, commerce and services.

== Communication and social infrastructure ==
Communication and social infrastructure refers to all the public works that the municipality counts on such as hospitals, schools and roads. Talking about education, Ixpantepec Nieves has a primary and a secondary school, both located near the downtown of the municipality. It also has a social assistance clinic from the I.M.S.S., or Mexican Institute of Social Security for its initials in Spanish. Ixpantepec Nieves also has a public market where people buy food and supplies for the house, there are two grocery stores and a "tianguis" which is similar to the market but the difference is that people sell their products on the street, those products are mainly fresh food like fruits, vegetables and sometimes chicken and meat. This municipality has two public basketball courts which are open every day at every time. According to the results of the 2005 population and housing count, Ixpantepec Nieves has 350 houses where 342 of them are owned by particulars. According to the government of the municipality, it counts with public lighting, drinkable water, underground drainage, garbage recollection and cleaning of public areas. The most important communication media are two mail agencies, a rural phone cabin, a radio signal and several television antennas. Finally the municipality has an unpaved road that connects it with Juxtlahuaca at the south and Silacayoapan at the east.
