= Estetla Mixtec =

Mixtec language of Oaxaca, Mexico

- Eastern Mixtec
- Native to: Mexico
- Region: Oaxaca
- Native speakers: (13,000 cited 2000)
- Language family: Oto-Manguean: Mixtecan; Mixtec; Estetla Mixtec

Language codes
- ISO 639-3: Variously: mil – Peñoles mxs – Huitepec mqh – Tlazoyaltepec vmx – Tamazola
- Glottolog: peno1244 Penoles tlaz1235 Tlazoyaltepec huit1252 Huitepec tama1339 Tamazola
- ELP: Eastern Alta Mixtec (shared)

Estetla Mixtec is a diverse Mixtec language of Oaxaca.

== Dialects ==
Egland & Bartholomew found four dialects which have about 75% mutual intelligibility with each other:

- (Santa María) Peñoles
- (San Antonio) Huitepec
- (Santiago) Tlazoyaltepec
- (San Juan) Tamazola

== Sources ==
- No author. 1977. Mixteco de Santa María Peñoles, Oaxaca. Mexico City: Centro de Investigación para la Integración Social. Series: Archivo de Lenguas Indigenas de Mexico.
- Daly, John P. 1973. A generative syntax of Peñoles Mixtec. Norman, Oklahoma: Summer Institute of Linguistics of the University of Oklahoma.
