= San Miguel Tlacamama =

- Municipality and town
- Location in Mexico
- Coordinates: 16°25′N 98°04′W
- Country: Mexico
- State: Oaxaca

Area
- 280.9 km^{2} (108.44 sq mi)

Population (2005)
  - Total: 3,074
- Time zone: UTC-6 (Central Standard Time)

San Miguel Tlacamama is a town and municipality in Oaxaca in south-western Mexico. The municipality covers an area of 108.44 km^{2}. It is located in the Jamiltepec District in the west of the Costa Region.

As of 2005, the municipality had a total population of 3,074.
