= Santiago Ixtayutla =

- Municipality and town
- Location in Mexico
- Coordinates: 16°34′N 97°39′W
- Country: Mexico
- State: Oaxaca

Population (2010)
  - Total: 11,917
- Time zone: UTC-6 (Central Standard Time)

Santiago Ixtayutla is a town and municipality in Oaxaca in south-western Mexico. It is located in the Jamiltepec District in the west of the Costa Region.

As of 2010, the municipality had a total population of 11,917.
