= Santa Catarina Mechoacán =

- Municipality and town
- Location in Mexico
- Coordinates: 16°20′N 97°50′W
- Country: Mexico
- State: Oaxaca
- Time zone: UTC-6 (Central Standard Time)

Santa Catarina Mechoacán is a town and municipality in Oaxaca in south-western Mexico. The municipality covers an area of km^{2}. It is located in the Jamiltepec District in the west of the Costa Region.
