= Silacayoapan Mixtec =

Mixtec languages of Mexico

- Native to: Mexico
- Region: Oaxaca, Guerrero
- Native speakers: (150,000 in Mexico cited 1990–2011)
- Language family: Oto-Manguean: Mixtecan; Mixtec; Silacayoapan–Cacaloxtepec; Silacayoapan Mixtec

Language codes
- ISO 639-3: Variously: mks – Silacayoapan mxb – Tezoatlán vmc – Juxtlahuaca mim – Alacatlatzala (Cahuatache) mxv – Metlatónoc (San Rafael) xta – Alcozauca jmx – Coicoyán (Western Juxtlahuaca) mxa – Portezuelo (Northwest Oaxaca)
- Glottolog: cent2266 Central Baja Mixtec sout3179 Southern Baja Mixtec guer1245 Guerrero Mixtec tezo1238 Tezoatlan Mixtec
- ELP: Central Baja Mixtec
- Guerrero Mixtec
- Tezoatlan Mixtec
- Southern Baja Mixtec (shared)

Silacayoapan is one of the more extensive Mixtec languages. It is spoken by 150,000 people in Puebla and across the border in Guerrero, as well as by emigrants to the United States.

== Dialects ==
Egland & Bartholomew found six dialects (with > ≈80% internal intelligibility) which had about 70% mutual intelligibility with each other:

- Metlatónoc (Metlatónoc, San Rafael, Tlacoachistlahuaca, Cochoapa), Alcozauca (Alcozauca, Xochapa, Petlacalancingo)
- Portezuelo (Santos Reyes Yucuná, Guadalupe Portezuelo, San Simón Zahuatlán)
- Coicoyán (San Martín Peras Cuatzoquitengo, Río Frijol, Santa Cruz Yucucani, San José Yoxocaño, Malvabisco, Rancho Limón, Río Aguacate, Boca de Mamey)
- (varieties within ≈75% of Silacayoapan proper)
  - Juxtlahuaca (San Sebastián Tecomaxtlahuaca, San Miguel Tlacotepec, Santos Reyes Tepejillo, Santa María Tindú, San Martín Duraznos)
  - Alacatlatzala (Alacatlatzala, Cahuatache, Tenaztalcingo, Jilotepec, Zacatipa, Tototepec, Cuba Libre, San Isidro Labrador, Quiahuitlatlatzala, Xonacatlán, Tepecocatlán, Cuautipa, Ocuapa, Potoichan)
  - Silacayoapan
    - Silacayoapan proper (Santo Domingo Tonalá, San Jorge Nuchita)
    - Tezoatlán (Yucuquimi de Ocampo, San Andrés Yutatío, Yucuñuti de Benito Juárez, San Juan Diquiyú, San Marcos de Garzón, San Martín del Río, Santa Catarina Yotandú, San Isidro de Zaragoza, San Valentín de Gomez)
    - (other towns) Ixpantepec Nieves, Santiago Tamazola, Atenango, San Miguel Ahuehuetitlán

Ethnologue counts (Santa María) Yucunicoco Mixtec with Juxtlahuaca Mixtec. However, Egland & Bartholomew found it to have only 50% intelligible with Juxtlahuaca. Comprehension of Mixtepec is 85%, but in the other direction only 45%.

== Phonology ==
=== Consonants ===
		Bilabial	Alveolar	Palatal	Velar	Glottal
Plosive	voiceless	p	t	tʃ	k kʷ	ʔ
Plosive	prenasal	ᵐb	ⁿd	ⁿdʒ	ᵑɡ	
Nasal		m	n	ɲ		
Fricative	voiceless		s	ʃ	x	
Fricative	voiced	β	ð	ʒ		
Approximant			l	j		
Rhotic			ɾ			

=== Vowels ===
	Front	Central	Back
Close	i ĩ	ʉ	u ũ
Close-Mid	e ẽ		o õ
Open		a ã	

== Sources ==
- Shields, Jäna K. (1988). "A syntactic sketch of Silacayoapan Mixtec". In Bradley, Henry; Hollenbach, Barbara E. (eds.). Studies in the syntax of Mixtecan languages (PDF). Vol. 1. Dallas: Summer Institute of Linguistics: University of Texas at Arlington. pp. 305–449.
- Tezoatlán Mixtec (SIL-Mexico)
