= Santa Cruz Itundujia =

- Municipality and town
- Location in Mexico
- Coordinates: 16°52′N 97°39′W
- Country: Mexico
- State: Oaxaca

Population (2020)
  - Total: 965
- Time zone: UTC-6 (Central Standard Time)

Santa Cruz Itundujia is a town and municipality in Oaxaca in south-western Mexico. The municipality covers an area of km^{2}. It is part of Putla District in the west of the Sierra Sur Region.

As of 2020, the municipality had a total population of 967 inhabitants.
