= San Juan Tamazola =

- Municipality and town
- Location in Mexico
- Coordinates: 17°09′N 97°13′W
- Country: Mexico
- State: Oaxaca

Area
  - Total: 156.93 km^{2} (60.59 sq mi)

Population (2005)
  - Total: 3,170
- Time zone: UTC-6 (Central Standard Time)

San Juan Tamazola is a town and municipality in Oaxaca in south-western Mexico. The municipality covers an area of 156.93 km^{2}. It is part of the Nochixtlán District in the southeast of the Mixteca Region.

As of 2010, the municipality had a total population of 3,446.
