= Santa María Huazolotitlán =

- Municipality and town
- Location in Mexico
- Coordinates: 16°17′N 97°56′W
- Country: Mexico
- State: Oaxaca
- Time zone: UTC-6 (Central Standard Time)

Santa María Huazolotitlán is a town and municipality in Oaxaca in south-western Mexico. It is located in the Jamiltepec District in the west of the Costa Region.
