= San Mateo Peñasco =

- Municipality and town
- Location in Mexico
- Coordinates: 17°09′N 97°32′W
- Country: Mexico
- State: Oaxaca

Area
  - Total: 155.65 km^{2} (60.10 sq mi)

Population (2005)
  - Total: 1,732
- Time zone: UTC-6 (Central Standard Time)

San Mateo Peñasco is a town and municipality in Oaxaca in south-western Mexico. The municipality covers an area of 155.65 km^{2}. It is part of the Tlaxiaco District in the south of the Mixteca Region.

As of 2005, the municipality had a total population of 1,732.

== History ==
The history of this town is unknown the only history data we know about this town is the construction of the temple of San Mateo Peñasco in the XVII.

== Geography ==
The Predominant weather in this town is moderate with rains during summer also the winds depend on the time during the season. Ocotes, encinos are found in the flora of San Mateo Peñasco. Most of the vegetation in this region is tropical.

== Economy ==
The principal economic activities in this region are: agriculture, ranching. The first activities is develop for Self-consumption of the region and the second one is not develop for commercialization only for Self-consumption also.
