= Pinotepa Nacional =

- Municipality and town
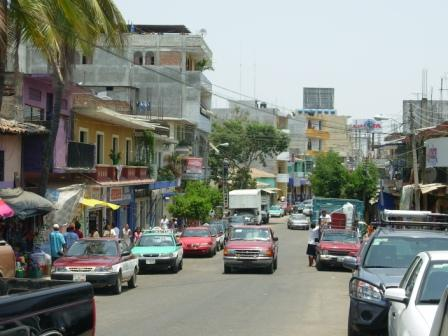
- Pinotepa Nacional

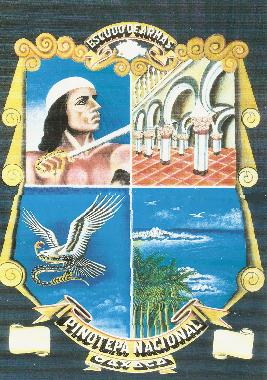
- Coat of arms

- Major cities of Oaxaca

- Location within Mexico
- Coordinates: 16°20′17″N 98°03′01″W
- Country: Mexico
- State: Oaxaca

Area
  - Municipality: 804.5 km^{2} (310.6 sq mi)
  - Town: 11.86 km^{2} (4.58 sq mi)

Population (2020 census)
  - Municipality: 55,840
  - Density: 69.41/km^{2} (179.8/sq mi)
  - Town: 33,726
  - Town density: 2,844/km^{2} (7,365/sq mi)
- Time zone: UTC-6 (Zona Centro)

Pinotepa Nacional (formally: Santiago Pinotepa Nacional; in Ñu'savi, Ñuu Ñoko, which means Twenty-House Town) is a city and seat of the municipality of the same name, in the Mexican state of Oaxaca. It is located in the Jamiltepec District in the west of the Costa Region. The name Pinotepa means "toward the crumbling hill" in Nahuatl.

== The town ==
During colonial times, its name was Pinotepa del Rey, and just after Independence, it was called Pinotepa del Estado. It is located at a height of 200 m above sea level in the Mixteca de la Costa region of the state.

The region has an interesting history. A high percentage of its population is of African ancestry. There are two historical theories of how this came about. The first is that during the colonial period African slaves were brought to this area to work on the various haciendas here. The second theory is that these people are the descendants of Africans destined for the slave trade whose ship wrecked off the coast of Oaxaca. This is also the home of the notorious bandit Silverio Petatán, who was captured and executed in 1864. Because of his boss-eye and colourful language, the bandit's head was brought to the town and put on public display for a number of days.

It is one of the few Afro-Mexican areas of the country (African descendants are also historically present in Guerrero, Sinaloa and Veracruz). It is also noted for crafts such as knitted items, embroidered items, and, in particular, knives, machetes and saddle making.

On February 16, 2018, a powerful earthquake struck the area.

== The municipality ==
As municipal seat, Pinotepa Nacional has governing jurisdiction over the following communities: Acuautepec o Agua de la Caña, Agua Dulce, Antonio García Zamora, Antonio Gazga, Arroyo Seco, Carnicería, Cerro de la Esperanza, Charco del Otate, Collantes, Colonia Cuauhtémoc, Colonia de la Libertad, Colonia UCIDEBACC, Colonia Vicente Guerrero, Corralero, La Cruz del Ita Kuán, El Dispensario, El Añil, El Alacrán, El Azicate, El Carrizal (El Toronjil), El Carrizo, El Ciruelo, El Conejo, El Cuachilote, El Jícaro, El Manguito, El Palomar, El Ranchito, El Retén, El Salado, El Tamal, El Tamarindo 1, El Tamarindo 2, El Tanaroa, El Viscaíno, El Zapote, Fraccionamiento San Isidro, Granja Avícola Delia, Guadalupe Victoria, Hornos los Pajaritos, Isaura Rodríguez, José Miguel Fuentes, La Alberca (Arroyo Limón), La Cañada, La Finca, La Ganadera, La Noria y Minindaca, La Palma, La Palma del Coyul, La Raya, Lagunillas, Las Lomas, Las Playitas, Librado Baños Baños, Lo de Candela, Lo de Mejía, Lo de Riaño, Lo de Vera, Loma Larga, Los Cuajilotes, Los Horcones, Los Hornos Grandes, Los Pocitos, Mancuernas, Mango Solo, Mariano Matamoros, Melquíades A. Vargas, Minillahui, Minitán, Las Motillas, Paso de la Garrocha, Pie del Cerro, Piedra Blanca, Playa Banco de Oro, Rancho de la Virgen, Rancho El Santo, Rancho Ramírez, Rose Mary, San Isidro, Santa María Xicaltepec, Willians, La Yerbasanta, Yutacuiñe, Yutacuite and Yuyaquita.

Nearby is the Laguna de Corralero, a lagoon that is propitious for fishing and bird watching.
