= Oto-Manguean languages =

Language family of Mesoamerica

Oto-Manguean
- Geographic distribution: Currently Mexico; previously Mesoamerica and Central America
- Linguistic classification: One of the world's primary language families
- Subdivisions: Oto-Pamean; Chinantecan; Tlapanecan; Manguean †; Popolocan; Zapotecan; Amuzgo; Mixtecan

Language codes
- ISO 639-5: omq
- Glottolog: otom1299
- Pre-contact distribution of the Oto-Manguean languages in Mexico and Central America

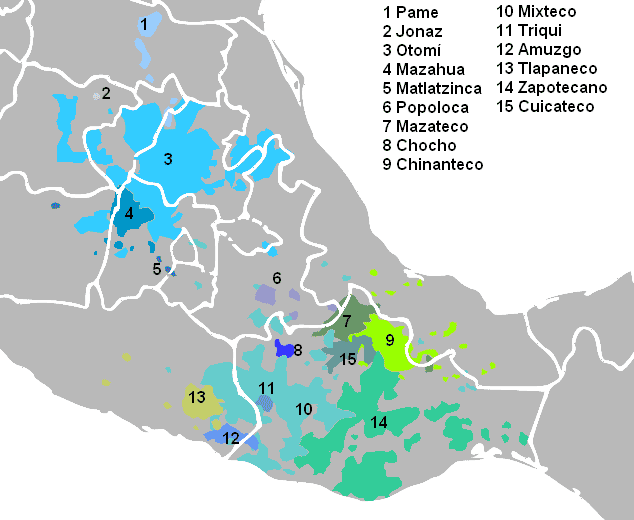
- The Oto-Manguean languages within Mexico.

The Oto-Manguean or Otomanguean (/ˌoʊtoʊˈmæŋɡiːən/ OH-to-MANG-ghee-ən) languages are a large family comprising several subfamilies of indigenous languages of the Americas. All of the Oto-Manguean languages that are now spoken are indigenous to Mexico, but the Manguean branch of the family, which is now extinct, was spoken as far south as Nicaragua and Costa Rica. Oto-Manguean is widely viewed as a proven language family.

The highest number of speakers of Oto-Manguean languages today is in the Mexican state of Oaxaca, where the two largest branches, the Zapotecan and the Mixtecan languages, are spoken by almost 1.5 million people combined. In central Mexico, particularly in the states of Mexico, Hidalgo, and Querétaro, the languages of the Oto-Pamean branch are spoken: the Otomi and the closely-related Mazahua have over 500,000 speakers combined. In the linguistic world of Mesoamerica, the Otomanguean family stands out as the most diverse and extensively distributed.

Some Oto-Manguean languages are moribund or highly endangered; for example, both Ixcatec and Matlatzinca have fewer than 250 speakers, most of whom are elderly. Other languages, particularly of the Manguean branch, which was spoken outside Mexico, have become extinct; they included the Chiapanec language, which was declared extinct after 1990. Others, such as Subtiaba, which was most closely related to Me'phaa (Tlapanec), have been extinct longer and are known only from early-20th-century descriptions.

The Oto-Manguean language family is the most diverse and most geographically-widespread language family that is represented in Mesoamerica. The internal diversity is comparable with that of Indo-European, and the Proto-Oto-Manguean language is estimated to have been spoken sometime before 2000 BCE. That means that at least for the past 4,000 years, Oto-Manguean languages have co-existed with the other languages of Mesoamerica and have developed so many traits in common with them that they are now seen as part of a Sprachbund, called the Mesoamerican Linguistic Area.

However, Oto-Manguean also stands out from the other language families of Mesoamerica in several features. It is the only language family in North America, Mesoamerica, and Central America whose members are all tonal languages. It also stands out by having a much more analytic structure than other Mesoamerican languages. Another typical trait of Oto-Manguean is that its members almost all show VSO (verb–subject–object) basic order of clausal constituents.

== Overview ==
Genealogical classification of Oto-Manguean languages
Family	Groups			Languages	Where spoken and approximate number of speakers
Oto-Manguean languages	Western Oto-Mangue	Oto-Pame–Chinantecan	Oto-Pamean	Otomi (Hñähñu) (several varieties)	Central Mexico (c. 212,000)
Oto-Manguean languages	Western Oto-Mangue	Oto-Pame–Chinantecan	Oto-Pamean	Mazahua (Hñatho)	Mexico (state) (c. 150,000)
Oto-Manguean languages	Western Oto-Mangue	Oto-Pame–Chinantecan	Oto-Pamean	Matlatzincan	Mexico (state). Two varieties: Ocuiltec–Tlahuica (c. 450) and Matlatzinca de San Francisco (c. 1,200)
Oto-Manguean languages	Western Oto-Mangue	Oto-Pame–Chinantecan	Oto-Pamean	Pame	San Luis Potosí. Three varieties: Southern Pame (no speakers), Central Pame (c. 5,000), Northern Pame (c. 5,000).
Oto-Manguean languages	Western Oto-Mangue	Oto-Pame–Chinantecan	Oto-Pamean	Chichimeca Jonaz	Guanajuato, San Luis Potosí (c. 1,500)
Oto-Manguean languages	Western Oto-Mangue	Oto-Pame–Chinantecan	Chinantecan	Chinantec (around 10 variants)	northern Oaxaca and southern Veracruz, (c. 224,000)
Oto-Manguean languages	Western Oto-Mangue	Tlapanec–Mangue	Tlapanecan	Tlapanec (Me'phaa)	Guerrero (c. 75,000)
Oto-Manguean languages	Western Oto-Mangue	Tlapanec–Mangue	Tlapanecan	Subtiaba (†)	Nicaragua
Oto-Manguean languages	Western Oto-Mangue	Tlapanec–Mangue	Manguean	Chiapanec (†)	Chiapas
Oto-Manguean languages	Western Oto-Mangue	Tlapanec–Mangue	Manguean	Mangue (†)	Nicaragua
Oto-Manguean languages	Eastern Oto-Mangue	Popolocan–Zapotecan	Popolocan	Mazatec	north-eastern Oaxaca and Veracruz (c. 206,000)
Oto-Manguean languages	Eastern Oto-Mangue	Popolocan–Zapotecan	Popolocan	Ixcatec	northern Oaxaca (2)
Oto-Manguean languages	Eastern Oto-Mangue	Popolocan–Zapotecan	Popolocan	Chocho	northern Oaxaca (< 850)
Oto-Manguean languages	Eastern Oto-Mangue	Popolocan–Zapotecan	Popolocan	Popoloca	Southern Puebla, (c. 17,000)
Oto-Manguean languages	Eastern Oto-Mangue	Popolocan–Zapotecan	Zapotecan	Zapotec (around 50 variants)	Central and eastern Oaxaca (c. 490,000)
Oto-Manguean languages	Eastern Oto-Mangue	Popolocan–Zapotecan	Zapotecan	Chatino (around 5 variants)	Oaxaca (c. 23,000)
Oto-Manguean languages	Eastern Oto-Mangue	Amuzgo–Mixtecan	Amuzgoan	Amuzgo (around 4 variants)	Oaxaca and Guerrero (c. 44,000)
Oto-Manguean languages	Eastern Oto-Mangue	Amuzgo–Mixtecan	Mixtecan	Mixtec (around 30 variants)	central, southern and western Oaxaca; southern Puebla and eastern Guerrero (c. 511,000)
Oto-Manguean languages	Eastern Oto-Mangue	Amuzgo–Mixtecan	Mixtecan	Cuicatec	Cuicatlán, Oaxaca, (c. 13,000)
Oto-Manguean languages	Eastern Oto-Mangue	Amuzgo–Mixtecan	Mixtecan	Trique (also called Triqui)	western Oaxaca (c. 30,000)

== History of classification ==
=== Internal classification and reconstruction ===
A genetic relationship between Zapotecan and Mixtecan was first proposed by Manuel Orozco y Berra in 1864; he also included Cuicatec, Chocho, and Amuzgo in his grouping. In 1865, Pimentel added Mazatec, Popoloca, Chatino, and Chinantec and also posed a separate group of Pame, Otomi and Mazahua, the beginning of the Oto-Pamean sub-branch. Daniel Brinton's classification of 1891 added Matlatzinca and Chichimeca Jonaz to Pimentel's Oto-Pamean group, which had not yet become known by that name, and he reclassified some languages of the previously-included languages of the Oaxacan group. In 1920, Walther Lehmann included the Chiapanec–Mangue languages and correctly established the major subgroupings of the Oaxacan group. In 1926, Schmidt coined the name "Otomi–Mangue" for a group consisting of the Oto-Pamean and the Chiapanec–Mangue languages. The Oto-Pamean and the Main Oaxacan groups were not joined into one family until Edward Sapir's classification in 1929, which included them in the Hokan languages.

In the 1950s, reconstructive work began to be done on individual Oto-Manguean language groups. Proto-Oto-Pamean was reconstructed by Doris Bartholomew, Proto-Zapotecan by Morris Swadesh, and Proto-Chiapanec–Mangue by Fernández de Miranda and Roberto Weitlaner. The classification by Campbell (1997) was the first to present a unified view of the Oto-Manguean languages. In 1981, William Merrifield published a reconstruction of the kinship terminologies of each of the Oto-Manguean branches and of Proto-Oto-Manguean. Unpublished reconstructions of Proto-Oto-Manguean grammar have also been made by Terrence Kaufman.

In spite of the lack of a full published reconstruction of Proto-Oto-Manguean, the language family has now been widely accepted by specialists, including Lyle Campbell, Terrence Kaufman, and William Poser. Campbell and Poser, writing in 2008, concluded, "Tlapanec-Subtiaba proved not to belong to 'Hokan' as postulated by Sapir (1925a), but to be a branch of Otomanguean...." Nonetheless, a few studies have retained the inclusion in Hokan, particularly Joseph Greenberg's widely-rejected 1987 classification, as well as its derivative works by Merritt Ruhlen. Writing in 1988, Leonardo Manrique still listed Tlapanec-Mangue as an isolated family.

The status of the Amuzgo language as part of the Mixtecan group or as forming its own branch from the Proto-Oto-Manguean node has been discussed by Longacre, who argued for the latter, but the most currently-accepted classification by Lyle Campbell (1997) follows Kaufman in considering Amuzgo to be a branch of Mixtecan. Swadesh (1960) and Rensch included the Huave language as a separate branch within Oto-Manguean, but the inclusion has proved to be untenable, as most of the cognates were loanwords from Zapotec. Huave is now considered a language isolate.

Longacre (1968) considered Oto-Manguean to be among the most extensively-studied language families of the world, with a level of reconstruction rivaling the Indo-European family in completeness, but Kaufman and Justeson (2009) reject that and lament the rudimentary reconstruction of Proto-Oto-Manguean lexicon (only c. 350 items have been reconstructed) and grammar. They call for a redoubling of the effort to document and reconstruct several important branches that have received little attention: principally Mixtecan, Popolocan, and Oto-Pamean.

Brown (2015) evaluated the evidence that has been assembled in support of Oto-Manguean. He points out that vocabulary reconstructed for Proto-Oto-Manguean is not supported by regular sound correspondences. While scholars, including Swadesh, Rensch, and Kaufman, have all reconstructed Proto-Oto-Manguean words, none has done so with the benefit of detailed sound correspondences, which makes Brown argue that their reconstructions, as well as Oto-Manguean itself, are called into question. Nevertheless, he suggests that Oto-Manguean as a Sprachbund (language diffusion area) is a reasonable alternative hypothesis to the proposal of Oto-Manguean as a language family.

- Oto‑Manguean
  - Western OM
    - Oto-Pamean
      - - Otomian
          - Otomi
          - Mazahua
        - Matlatzinca
        - Chichimeca (Jonaz)
        - Pamean
      - Chinantec
    - Tlapanec–Mangue
      - Tlapanecan
        - Tlapanec
        - Subtiaba
      - Manguean
  - Eastern OM
    - - Popolocan
        - - Chocho
          - Popoloca
        - Ixcatec
        - Mazatecan
      - Zapotecan
    - ?
      - Amuzgo
      - Mixtecan
        - Mixtec
        - Trique
        - Cuicatec

=== Inclusion in macro-family hypotheses ===
Some early classifications, such as that by Brinton, considered that Oto-Manguean languages might be related to Chinese because its languages, like Chinese, were tonal and mostly monosyllabic. That idea was quickly abandoned as it was discovered that tonal languages are common, and advances in the historical study of Chinese were made, including the discovery that Old Chinese was non-tonal.

Edward Sapir included Subtiaba–Tlapanec in his Hokan phylum but did not classify the other Oto-Manguean languages in his famous 1929 classification. In his 1960 classification, Joseph Greenberg considered Oto-Manguean so aberrant from other Native American languages that it was the only accepted family (aside from the Purépecha isolate), which he made a primary branch of his Amerind family. However, in his 1987 revision, Greenberg linked it with Aztec-Tanoan in a "Central Amerind" branch, apart from Tlapanec, which, although it had been unequivocally linked to Oto-Manguean, he continued to classify as Hokan.

No hypothesis including Oto-Manguean in any higher-level unit has been able to withstand scrutiny.

== Prehistory ==
The Oto-Manguean family has existed in southern Mexico at least since 2000 BCE and probably several thousand years earlier, and some estimates using the controversial method of glottochronology suggest an approximate splitting date of Proto-Otomanguean at c. 4400 BCE. That makes the Oto-Manguean family the language family of the Americas with the deepest time depth, as well as the oldest language family with evidence of tonal contrast in the proto-language.

The Oto-Manguean Urheimat has been thought to be in the Tehuacán Valley in connection with one of the earliest neolithic cultures of Mesoamerica, and although it is now unsure whether Tehuacán was the original home of the Proto-Otomanguean people, it is agreed that the Tehuacán culture (5000 BCE–2300 BCE) was likely made up of Oto-Mangue speakers.

The long history of the Oto-Manguean family has resulted in considerable linguistic diversity between the branches of the family. Terrence Kaufman compares the diversity between the main branches of Oto-Manguean with that between the main branches of Indo-European. Kaufman also proposes that Oto-Manguean languages are an important candidate for being the source of many of the traits that have diffused into the other languages in the Mesoamerican linguistic area.

Oto-Mangue-speakers have been among the earliest to form highly complex cultures of Mesoamerica. The archeological site of Monte Albán, with remains dated as early as 1000 BCE, is believed to have been in continuous use by Zapotecs. The undeciphered Zapotec script is one of the earliest forms of Mesoamerican writing.

Other Mesoamerican cultural centers that may have been wholly or partly Oto-Manguean include the late classical sites of Xochicalco, which may have been built by Matlatzincas, and Cholula, which may have been inhabited by Manguean peoples. Some akso propose an Oto-Pamean presence in Teotihuacán. The Zapotecs are among the candidates to have invented the first writing system of Mesoamerica, and during the Post-Classic period, the Mixtecs were prolific artisans and codex painters. During the Post-Classic period, the Oto-Manguean cultures of Central Mexico became marginalized by the intruding Nahuas, and some like the Chiapanec–Mangue speakers, went south into Guerrero, Chiapas and Central America, and others such as the Otomi relocated from their ancient homes in the Valley of Mexico to the less fertile highlands on the rim of the valleys.

== Geography and demographics ==
=== Western branch ===
==== Oto-Pamean ====
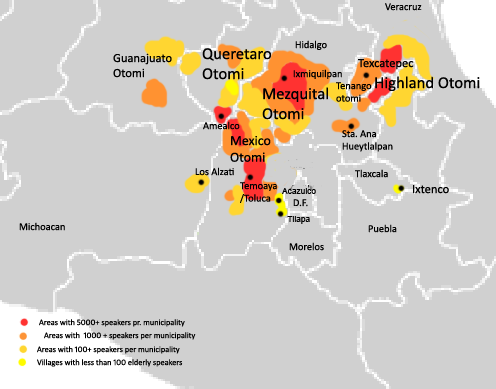
Map of the different dialect areas of Otomí in central Mexico

The languages of the Oto-Pamean branch are spoken in central and western Mexico. The group includes the Otomian languages: Otomi, which is spoken primarily in the states of Mexico, Hidalgo, Puebla, and Veracruz (c. 293,000 speakers); Mazahua, which is spoken in the western part of the State of Mexico (c. 350,000 speakers); and the endangered Matlatzincan languages including Matlatzinca (c. 1000 speakers in the town of San Francisco Oxtotilpan) and Tlahuica (also called Ocuilteco) (c. 400 speakers in the municipio of Ocuilan) both spoken in the State of Mexico; And the Pamean group composed of the two living Pame languages of San Luís Potosí, Northern Pame being spoken in communities from the north of Río Verde on the border with Tamaulipas (c. 5500 speakers), and Central Pame spoken in the town of Santa María Acapulco (c. 4000 speakers), the extinct Southern Pame language, and the Chichimeca Jonaz language spoken in Misión de Chichimecas near San Luis de la Paz, in the state of Guanajuato (c. 200 speakers).

Otomi is traditionally described as a single language although not all of its many dialects are mutually intelligible. The language classification of the SIL International's Ethnologue considers Otomi to be a cover term for nine separate Otomi languages and assigns a different ISO code to each of these nine varieties. Currently, Otomi varieties are spoken collectively by c. 239,000 speakers, some 5 to 6 percent of whom are monolingual. Because of recent migratory patterns, small populations of Otomi speakers can be found in new locations throughout Mexico and in the United States.

The Otomi languages are vigorous in some areas, and children acquire the language through natural transmission (e.g. in the Mezquital Valley of Hidalgo and in the Highlands). However, three varieties are now considered moribund: those of Ixtenco (Tlaxcala state), Santiago Tilapa and Acazulco (Mexico state), and Cruz del Palmar (Guanajuato state). In some municipalities, the level of monolingualism in Otomi is as high as 22.3% (Huehuetla, Hidalgo) or 13.1% (Texcatepec, Veracruz). Monolingualism is normally significantly more frequent for women than for men.

==== Chinantecan ====
The Chinantecan languages are spoken by c. 93,000 people in Northern Oaxaca and Southern Veracruz in the districts of Cuicatlán, Ixtlán de Juárez, Tuxtepec and Choapan. Ethnologue recognizes 14 separate varieties, with separate ISO codes.

==== Tlapanec–Mangue ====
The Tlapanec language is spoken by c. 75,000 people in Guerrero. There are four principal varieties, which are named after the communities in which they are spoken: Acatepec, Azoyú, Malinaltepec and Tlacoapa. Recent labor migrations have introduced Tlapanec speaking communities to the state of Morelos. It was closely related to the Subtiaba language, which was spoken in Nicaragua but is now extinct.

All Manguean languages are extinct. They included the Mangue and Chorotega languages, which were spoken in Nicaragua and Costa Rica in the early 20th century, and the Chiapanec language, which was spoken in Chiapas, Mexico, by a handful of speakers in the 1990s.

=== Eastern branch ===
==== Popolocan ====
The Popolocan language group includes the seven different varieties of Popoloca that are spoken in southern Puebla, near Tehuacán and Tepexi de Rodríguez (c. 30,000 speakers), and the closely related Chocho language (c. 700 speakers) spoken in Northern Oaxaca state, and the 8 different Mazatecan languages spoken in northern Oaxaca (c. 120,000 speakers), and the nearly extinct Ixcatec language spoken in Santa María Ixcatlán (< 8 speakers). The Popolocan languages should not be confused with the languages called Popoluca, which are spoken in Veracruz and belong to the unrelated Mixe–Zoquean language family. The Mazatecan languages are known for their prolific use of whistled speech.

==== Zapotecan ====
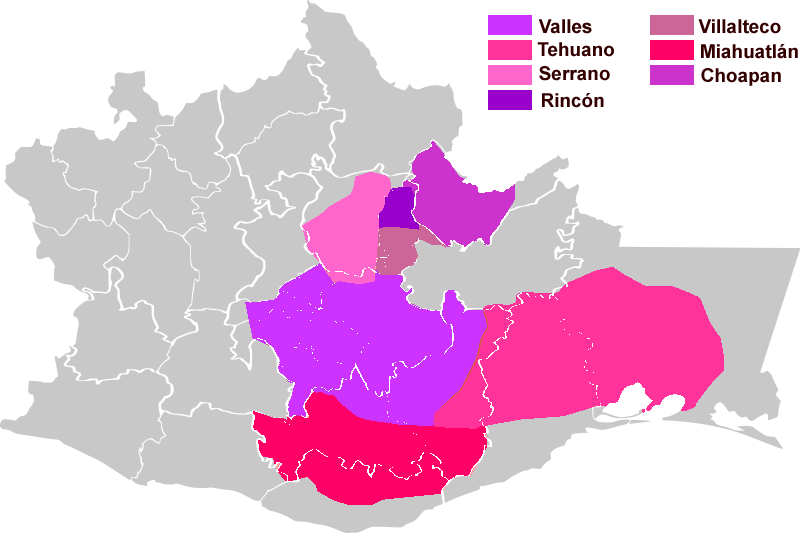
The location of Zapotec dialect groups within the state of Oaxaca.

The Zapotecan subgroup is formed by the Zapotec languages (c. 785,000 speakers of all varieties) and the related Chatino language (c. 23,000 speakers). All are traditionally spoken in central and southern Oaxaca, but they have been spread throughout Mexico and even into the United States through recent labor-related migrations.

Zapotec languages and dialects fall into four broad geographic divisions: Zapoteco de la Sierra Norte (Northern Zapotec), Valley Zapotec, Zapoteco de la Sierra Sur (Southern Zapotec), and Isthmus Zapotec. Northern Zapotec languages are spoken in the mountainous region of Oaxaca, in the Northern Sierra Madre mountain ranges. Southern Zapotec languages and are spoken in the mountainous region of Oaxaca, in the Southern Sierra Madre mountain ranges. Valley Zapotec languages are spoken in the Valley of Oaxaca. Isthmus Zapotec languages are spoken in the Isthmus of Tehuantepec. Ethnologue recognizes 57 varieties of Zapotec and 6 varieties of Chatino by distinct ISO codes.

==== Mixtecan–Amuzgoan ====
Mixtec languages (in green) and its surrounding languages including Triqui, Cuicatec and Amuzgo within the state of Oaxaca.

The Mixtecan branch includes the many different mutually-unintelligible varieties of Mixtec, spoken by about 511,000 people, as well as the Trique (or Triqui) languages, spoken by about 24,500 people, and Cuicatec, spoken by about 15,000 people. The Mixtecan languages are traditionally spoken in the region known as La Mixteca, which is shared by the Mexican states of Oaxaca, Puebla and Guerrero. Because of migration from that region, the Mixtecan languages have expanded to Mexico's main urban areas, particularly the State of México and the Federal District, to certain agricultural areas such as the San Quintín valley in Baja California and parts of Morelos and Sonora, and even into the United States.

The Mixtec language is a complex set of regional varieties, many of which are not mutually intelligible. The varieties are sometimes grouped by geographic area by using designations such as those of the Mixteca Alta, the Mixteca Baja, and the Mixteca de la Costa. However, the dialects do not actually follow the geographic areas, and the precise historical relationships between the different varieties have not been worked out. The number of varieties of Mixtec depends in part on what the criteria are for grouping them, of course; at one extreme, government agencies once recognized no dialectal diversity. Mutual intelligibility surveys and local literacy programs have led SIL International to identify more than 50 varieties, which have been assigned distinct ISO codes.

Four Amuzgo varieties are spoken in the Costa Chica region of Guerrero and Oaxaca by about 44,000 speakers. The four varieties recognized by the Mexican government are Northern Amuzgo (amuzgo del norte, commonly known as Guerrero or (from its major town) Xochistlahuaca Amuzgo), Southern Amuzgo (amuzgo del sur, heretofore classified as a subdialect of Northern Amuzgo); Upper Eastern Amuzgo (amuzgo alto del este, commonly known as Oaxaca Amuzgo or San Pedro Amuzgos Amuzgo); Lower Eastern Amuzgo (amuzgo bajo del este, commonly known as Ipalapa Amuzgo). Those varieties are very similar, but there is a significant difference between the western varieties (Northern and Southern) and the eastern varieties (Upper Eastern and Lower Eastern), as revealed by recorded text testing done in the 1970s.

== Phonology ==
=== Common phonological traits ===
All Oto-Manguean languages have tone: some have only two level tones and others up to five. Many languages also have a number of contour tones.

Many Oto-Manguean languages have phonemic vowel nasalization. Many languages lack labial consonants, particularly stops, and those that have labial stops normally have them as a reflex of Proto-Oto-Manguean */kʷ/.

=== Tone systems ===
The Oto-Manguean languages have a wide range of tonal systems; some have as many as 10 tone contrasts and others only two. Some languages have a register system that distinguishes tones only by relative pitch. Others have a contour system that also distinguishes tones with gliding pitch. Most, however, are combinations of the register and the contour systems. Tone as a distinguishing feature is entrenched in the structure of the Oto-Manguean languages and is in no way the peripheral phenomenon that it is in other languages that have acquired tone recently or are in a process of losing it.

In most Oto-Manguean languages, tone serves both to distinguish between the meanings of roots and to indicate different grammatical categories. In Chiquihuitlan Mazatec, which has four tones, the following minimal pairs occur: cha^{1} /tʃa˥/ "I talk", cha^{2} /tʃa˦/ "difficult", cha^{3} /tʃa˧/ "his hand" cha^{4} /tʃa˩/ "he talks".

The language with the most level tones is Usila Chinantec, which has five. Chicahuaxtla Trique has a similar system.

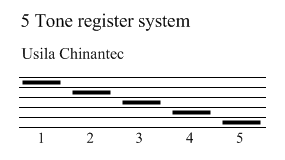

In Copala Triqui, which has a mixed system, only three level tones but five tonal registers are distinguished within the contour tones.

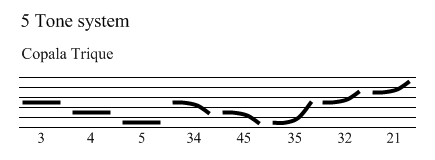

Many other systems have only three tone levels, such as Tlapanec and Texmelucan Zapotec.

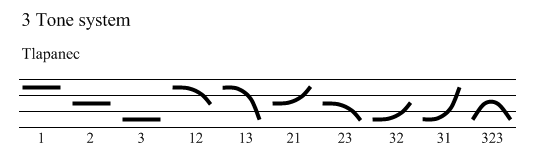

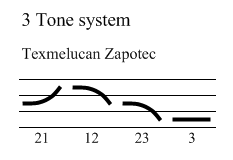

Particularly common in the Oto-Pamean branch are small tonal systems with only two level tones and one contour tone, such as in Pame and Otomi. Some others like Matlatzinca and Chichimeca Jonaz have only the level tones and no contour.

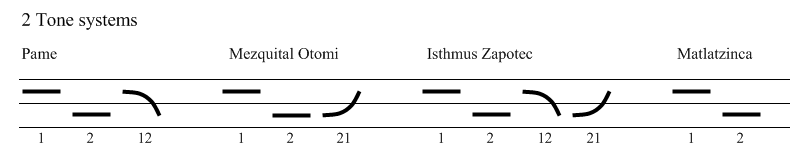

In some languages, stress influences tone. For example, in Pame, only stressed syllables have a tonal contrast. In Mazahua, the opposite occurs, and all syllables except the final stressed one distinguish tone. In Tlapanec, stress is determined by the tonal contour of the words. Most languages have systems of tone sandhi in which the tones of a word or syllable are influenced by other tones in other syllables or words. Chinantec has no sandhi rules, but Mixtec and Zapotec have elaborate systems. For Mazatec, some dialects such as Soyaltepec have elaborate sandhi systems, and others such as Huautla Mazatec do not. Some languages, particularly Mixtecan, also have tone terracing in which some tones "upstep" or "downstep," which causes a rise or drop in pitch level for the entire tonal register in subsequent syllables.

=== Whistled speech ===
Several Oto-Manguean languages have systems of whistled speech in which whistling the tonal combinations of words and phrases allows information to be transmitted over distances without words being used. Whistled speech is particularly common in Chinantec, Mazatec, and Zapotecan languages.

== Proto-language ==
Proto-Oto-Manguean
- Reconstruction of: Oto-Manguean languages

=== Syllable structure ===
Proto-Oto-Manguean allowed only open syllables of the structure CV (or CVʔ). Syllable-initial consonant clusters were very limited, and only sibilant-CV, CyV, CwV, nasal-CV, ChV, or CʔV were usually allowed. Many modern Oto-Manguean languages keep those restrictions in syllable structure, but others, most notably the Oto-Pamean languages, allow both final clusters and long syllable-initial clusters, as in this example, with three initial and three final consonants, from Northern Pame: /nlʔo^{2}spt/ "their houses."

=== Phonemes ===
The following phonemes are reconstructed for Proto-Oto-Manguean:

Reconstructed consonant phonemes of Proto-Oto-Manguean
	Bilabial	Dental	Alveolar	Palatal	Velar	Labiovelar	Glottal
Nasals	*m		*n				
Stops			*t		*k	*kʷ	*ʔ
Affricate			*ts				
Fricatives		*θ	*s		*x	*xʷ	
Rhotic			*r				
Glides			*l	*j		*w	

Reconstructed vowel phonemes of Proto–Oto-Manguean
Front	Central	Back
*i		*u
*e		*o
	*a	

A reconstruction from Calvin Rensch proposes four tones for Proto-Oto-Manguean. The later, revised reconstruction by Terrence Kaufman contains the following proto-phonemes, which are not included in Rensch's reconstruction: */ts/, */θ/, */x/, */xʷ/, */l/, */r/, */m/ and */o/. Kaufman also posits the vowel combinations */ia/, */ai/, */ea/, and */au/.

The Oto-Manguean languages have changed quite a lot from the very spartan phonemic inventory of Proto-Oto-Manguean. Many languages have rich inventories of both vowels and consonants. Many have a full series of fricatives, and some branches (particularly Zapotecan and Chinantecan) distinguish voicing in both stops and fricatives. The voiced series of the Oto-Pamean languages have both fricative and stop allophones. Otomian languages also have a full series of front, central, and back vowels. Some analyses of Mixtecan include a series of voiced prenasalised stops and affricates, which can also be analysed as consonant sequences, but they would be the only consonant clusters known in those languages.

Here are some of the simplest sound changes, which have served to divide the Oto-Manguean languages into sub-branches:

*/t/ to /tʃ/ in Chatino
*/kʷ/ to /p/ in Manguean, Oto-Pame, and Isthmus Zapotec
*/s/ to /θ/ in Mixtecan
*/s/ to /t/ in Chatino
*/w/ to /o/ before vowels in Oto-Pame
*/j/ to /i/ before vowels in Oto-Pame and Amuzgo
