= Mixtecan languages =

Oto-Manguean language branch of Mexico

Mixtecan
- Geographic distribution: Oaxaca, Puebla, Guerrero
- Linguistic classification: Oto-Manguean: Eastern; Amuzgo–Mixtecan?; Mixtecan
- Subdivisions: Mixtec; Trique; Cuicatec

Language codes
- Glottolog: mixt1422
- Extent of the Mixtecan languages: prior to contact (olive green) and current (red)

The Mixtecan languages constitute a branch of the Oto-Manguean language family of Mexico. They include the Trique (or Triqui) languages, spoken by about 24,500 people; Cuicatec, spoken by about 15,000 people; and the large expanse of Mixtec languages, spoken by about 511,000 people. The relationship between Trique, Cuicatec, and Mixtec, is an open question. Unpublished research by Terrence Kaufman in the 1980s supported grouping Cuicatec and Mixtec together.

== Proto-Mixtecan ==
Proto-Mixtecan
- Reconstruction of: Mixtecan languages

The urheimat of the Oto-Manguean family may be the valley of Tehuacán in Puebla state. This site was one of the places of the domestication of maize. The thousand-year presence of Oto-Manguean-speaking groups in this region makes it probable that they were active in this domestication process, which favored the inhabitants of the Altiplano's transition to a sedentary lifestyle and thus influenced the development of Mesoamerican civilization. Campbell and Kaufman have proposed that the Oto-Manguean languages began to diverge about 1500 BCE. The difficulty of establishing more general relationships between the eight subgroups of the family presents a difficulty for making more detailed inferences on the historical development of the languages.

Proto-Oto-Manguean has been reconstructed by Robert E. Longacre and Calvin Rensch. The phonological system of the proto-language has nine consonants, four vowels, and four tones. The groups of consonants and the diphthongs formed from this limited repertory would have been the origin of the phonemes in the daughter proto-languages of the various subgroups of Proto-Oto-Manguean. Some of the most significant changes in the diversification of Proto-Oto-Manguean phonemes into Proto-Mixtecan phonemes are the following:

Proto-Oto-Manguean	*t	*k	*kʷ	*s	*n	*y	*w	*nt	*nk	*nkʷ	*ns	*nn	*ny	*nw
Proto-Mixtecan	*t	*k		*θ		*y	*w	*ⁿd	*ⁿɡ	*ⁿɡʷ	*ⁿɡʷ		*l	*m

Rensch revised the reconstruction work of Longacre. He revised the probable phonological inventory and described some of his proposals, based on comparisons of the cognates in the Mixtecan languages. After this work, he proposed a reconstruction of the phonological system of Proto-Mixtecan. This proposal contains sixteen consonants, four vowels, and four tones.

Reconstruction of the Proto-Mixtecan consonant system
	Labial	Dental	Alveolar	Postalveolar	Palatal	Velar		Glottal
Nasal consonant	*m	*n						
Occlusives		*t *ⁿd				*k *ⁿɡ	*kʷ *ⁿɡʷ	*ʔ
Fricatives		*θ				*x	*xʷ	*h
Approximants		*l			*j		*w	
Source: Rensch (1977): 59.

Longacre (1957) had reconstructed the following consonant inventory for Proto-Mixtecan:

	Bilabial	Dental		Palatal	Velar		Labiovelar		Glottal
Nasal	*m	*n		*ñ					
Occlusive		*t	*d		*k	*ɡ	*kʷ	*ɡʷ	*ʔ
Fricative		*θ			*x		*xʷ		
Approximant		*l		*j			*w		

== See also ==
- Classification of Mixtec languages
- Francisco de Alvarado
