= Cuyuxquihui =

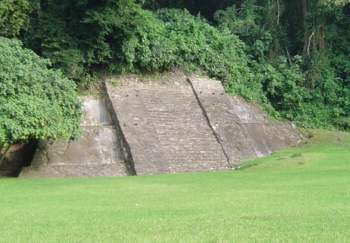
- Cuyuxquihui archaeological site
- Interactive map of Cuyuxquihui
- 20°18′17.83″N 97°15′43.94″W
- Periods: Postclassical
- Cultures: Totonac – Tepehua
- Location: Paso de Correo, Papantla, Veracruz; Mexico

History
- Built: Around 1250 CE.

Cuyuxquihui is an archaeological site located in the Tecolutla valley of Veracruz, Mexico, belonging to the Totonac culture, about 22 kilometres (14 mi) southeast of El Tajín or 5 kilometres (3.1 mi) southeast of Paso de Correo.

The name Cuyuxquihui comes from the Totonac language: cuyu, armadillo and quihui, wood and it refers to the similarity of the local fauna to the shell of that animal.

This site is about 74.29 kilometres (46.2 mi) southwest from Las Higueras (archaeological site), another Totonac site in the region.

== The Totonacs ==
The name Totonac is possibly translated as "three hearts", likely referring to three centers of this culture:

- El Tajín (300-1200), considered the most notable Totonac site
- Papantla (900-1519).
- Zempoala (900-1519).

This culture had a large ceramic variety and stone sculpture, monumental architecture and cities with an advanced urban concept. The Totonacan languages are a family of closely related languages spoken by approximately 200,000 Totonac and Tepehua people in the states of Veracruz, Puebla, and Hidalgo in Mexico. They are not demonstrably related to any other languages, although they share numerous areal features with other languages of the Mesoamerican language area, such as the Mayan languages and Nahuatl.

== The site ==
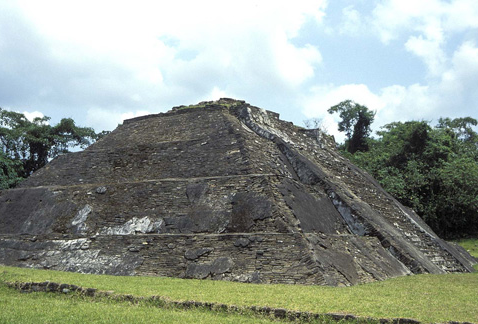
Cuyuxquihui Building

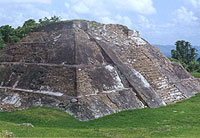
Cuyuxquihui Archaeological Site

This settlement would seem to have been a fortress, due to some architectonic characteristics; the existence of retaining walls that run throughout the esplanade north to south has been confirmed; its height makes it relatively inaccessible from the west, as well as by the cliff that borders it to the east. It is believed it was required due to the large social mobility that ensued after the fall of Tajín.

Material remains on the various regional settlements, leads to believe that a good part of them were contemporaries of El Tajín and that some developed after its gradual abandonment. Evidence seem to indicate that the Cuyuxquihui settlement was founded in 1250 CE.

Cuyuxquihui developed, after the El Tajín decline, as an important ceremonial activities center. Diverse structures were constructed by means of ground surface leveling, construction element characteristic of the “Tajín Chico” site. The first constructions used selected materials, which were applied with mortar elements and subsequently were finished with gross stucco and painted.

Cuyuxquihui was conquered by the Mexica ruler Moctezuma Ilhuicamina (1398 – 1469) around 1465, and this is probably one of the most important reasons for the cultural mix of Totonac, Mexica and Huastec elements at the site.

== Structures ==
Most important buildings:

=== Building 1 ===
This is a four bodied pyramid and a small vertical wall; remains of blue and red paintings were found on it. Objects found on this building are: a knife, fine ceramics and tablets with Quetzalcoatl engravings, indicate that the building was used for ritual functions.

=== South Building ===
This structure is considered the oldest in the site.

=== Building III ===
At the top of this structure, a two-meter-high (6.6 ft) monolith was found; it has evidence of having been re-modeled in three occasions; the last one, with Aztec influence occurred in 1400 CE.

=== Buildings IV and V ===
The structure is also called “dos unidos” (two jointed); in the top both have a small platform, over which probably was another construction, that is not there anymore.

=== Ballgame Court ===
The court is I-shaped and measures 72 meters long by 4 wide, it was constructed on a topographic accident.
