= Macro-Mayan languages =

Proposed Mesoamerican language family

Macro-Mayan
- (disputed)
- Geographic distribution: Mesoamerica
- Linguistic classification: Proposed language family
- Subdivisions: Mayan; Totonacan; Mixe–Zoque; Huave

Language codes
- Glottolog: None

Macro-Mayan is a proposal linking the clearly established Mayan family with neighboring families that show similarities to Mayan. The term was apparently coined by McQuown (1942), but suggestions for historical relationships relevant to this hypothesis can be traced back to Squier (1861), who offered comparisons between Mayan and Mixe-Zoquean languages, and Radin (1916, 1919, 1924), who did the same for Mixe-Zoquean, Huave, and Mayan.

== History of proposals ==
McQuown (1942, 1956) defined Macro-Mayan as the hypothetical ancestor of Mayan, Mije-Sokean, and Totonacan, further promoting the hypothesis. However, his hypothesis relied on the presence of "a glottalized series" of consonants in both Mayan and Totonakan. Such a trait could have potentially spread through contact. McQuown also admitted that “the relatively small number of coincidences in vocabulary indicates to us that this kinship is quite distant” (McQuown 1942:37-38).

The hypothesis was not elaborated until 1979 when Brown and Witkowski put forth a proposal with 62 cognate sets and supposed sound correspondences between the two families. They also published two articles proposing a "Mesoamerican Phylum" composed of Macro-Mayan and other language families of Mesoamerica. This proposal was examined closely by Lyle Campbell and Terrence Kaufman who rejected the proposal because of serious flaws in the methodology that had been applied. They rejected almost all of the 62 cognates. First and foremost they found it important to identify all cases of linguistic diffusion before collecting possible cognates because diffusion has been widespread within the Mesoamerican Linguistic Area. The exchanges between Brown and Witkowski and Campbell and Kaufman took place in the journal American Anthropologist between 1978 and 1983.

In the late 1990s, Campbell (1997) expressed that he believed that Mayan would indeed some day prove to be related to Mixe–Zoquean and Totonacan, but that previous studies have not proven sufficient.

Nevertheless, since then, Brown et al. (2011) have presented arguments in favor of a Totozoquean, a common ancestor between Totonacan and Mixe-Zoquean. Moreover, Mora-Marín (2014, 2016) constitutes the most recent attempt to test the relationship between Mayan and Mixe-Zoquean. He proposes the existence of regular sound correspondences among lexical and grammatical comparanda between the two. By transitivity, these two proposals would connect all three language families, rekindling the Macro-Mayan hypothesis as framed by McQuown.

According to Campbell (1997), previous efforts to link Huave to Mayan, Mixe-Zoquean, Totonacan, or for that matter, any other language or family, has proven unfruitful, and Huave "should thus be considered an isolate" (Campbell 1997:161).

Campbell (2024) considers the proposed connection between Mayan and Mixe-Zoquean to be likely, but doubts that the greater Macro-Mayan hypothesis is valid.

== Related proposals ==
Stark (1972) proposed a Maya–Yunga–Chipayan macrofamily linking Mayan with the Chimuan and Uru–Chipaya language families of South America.

== Vocabulary ==
Below is a comparison of selected basic vocabulary items.

Abbreviations

- CM = Proto-Central Mayan
- SM = Proto-Southern Mayan
- M = Proto-Totonacan reconstructions from MacKay & Trechsel (2018); other reconstructions are from Brown, Wichmann & Beck (2014)

gloss	Proto-Mayan	Chitimacha	Proto-Totozoquean	Proto-Totonacan	Proto-Mixe-Zoquean	Proto-Huave
head	SM *joʔl	kut		*kuk-	*ko-pɑk	*-mála
hair	*wiʔ	kuh (hair, fur, feathers)			*wɑ(ʔ)y	*-ndɪ̀ca
eye	*Haty	kani				*-nìːka, *-nɪːko
ear	*xikin	waʔaš	*akə		*tɑːcɨk	*-làːka
nose	*nhiiʔ		*kʸin		*hɨp(ɨ)	*-síngi
tooth	*ʔeeh	ʔiʔ		M *ta¢a-	*tɨːc	*-láːkɪ
tongue	*ʔaʔq’	wenʔ	*kAːt	M *siimaq’aati	*toːc	*-nìwi
mouth	*tyiiʔ	šaʔ	*kʸwehʔɬ	M *kiɬni	*ʔɑw	*-mbeye
hand	*q’ab’	waši	*məhʔkʸ; *ɬkʸəːʔ	M *maka- (prefix)	*kɨʔ	*-wísi
foot	*ʔaqan	soʔ, soʔo			*mɑŋ-kuy (P-Zoquean)	*-lehe
breast	*ʔiim	miʔ		M *¢’ík’iiti	*kuk-pɑk (P-Zoquean)	
meat	CM *tiʔ.b’ej	kipi	*kʸiniː	*kiníːt	*sis(i)	*-nìhi
blood	*kèhe	ʔuybi	*pIn		*nɨʔpin	*kèhe
bone	*b’aaq	kaci	*pak	*lukuti	*pɑk	*-làːca
person	*winaq	panš	*pǝn		*hɑyɑ́(w), *pɨn	*na-sɨ̀yɪ
name	*b’ih				*nɨyi (P-Zoquean)	*-natɪ
dog	CM *tz’iʔ				*tɑkɑ	*kɪsA; *patɪ
fish	*kar	makš			*ʔɑksɑ, *kɑkʔe	
louse	*ʔuk’		*skʸwaːt	M *skaata	*ʔɑːwɑt	*mbáta
tree	*tyeeʔ		*kʸƗCI		*kuy	*simi-sata
leaf	*xaq	či·š			*ʔɑy	*(-)opo
flower		ša·mu		*ša'ná (v.)	*pɨhi(k)	*mbáha
water	*Haʔ	kuʔ	*nəhnq	*škaːn	*nɨːʔ	*ewe
fire	*q’ahq’	tep	*Hikʸʔ ~ *Hukʸʔ	*šqu	*hukʔ-ut	*(m)bìmbɨ
stone	SM *toonh	nuš	*čahʔ	M *čiwiš	*cɑːʔ	*kanga
earth	*ch’ohch’	neyʔ		*ti'ya't	*nɑːs	*ìtɨ
salt	*ʔaʔtz’aam		*ma¢		*kɑːnɑ	*kɪnìkɨ
road	*b’eeh	miš			*tu:ʔ-ʔɑw	*tɪ̀ːtɨ
eat	*waʔ	gušt-		M *wahin-ya 'eats'	*muks (~ una cosa tostada)	*-tɪ
die	*kam	nu·p-			*ʔoːʔk (P-Mixean); *kɑʔ (P-Zoquean)	*-ndewe
I	*ʔiin				*ʔɨːci ~ *ʔɨc	*sik-V
you	*ʔat		*mwiš		*miš (Proto-Oaxaca Mixean)	*ikV

== See also ==
- Totozoquean languages
- Penutian languages
- Classification of indigenous languages of the Americas
