= Sierra Totonac language =

Language of Puebla and Veracruz, Mexico

Sierra Totonac
- Highland Totonac
- Native to: Mexico
- Region: Puebla and Veracruz
- Native speakers: (120,000 cited 1982) plus 48,000 Coyutla (2000)
- Language family: Totozoquean ?: Totonacan; Totonac; Central; Lowland–Sierra; Sierra Totonac
- Writing system: Latin

Language codes
- ISO 639-3: Either: toc – Coyutla Totonac tos – (other varieties)
- Glottolog: lowl1244
- ELP: Sierra Totonac

Sierra Totonac is a native American language complex spoken in Puebla and Veracruz, Mexico. One of the Totonac languages, it is also known as Highland Totonac. The language is best known through the work of the late Herman “Pedro” Aschmann who produced a small dictionary and several academic articles on the language.

== Varieties ==
The varieties of Sierra Totonac are rather diverse, and specialists tend to consider them distinct languages. They are:

- Zapotitlán (Zapotitlán de Méndez) Totonac (in Sierra Norte de Puebla)
- Coyutla Totonac
- Olintla Totonac
- Ozelonacaxtla Totonac
- Huehuetla Totonac
- Coatepec Totonac†

Zapotitlán Totonac is the best known, being the variety described by Aschmann.

== See also ==
- Papantla Totonac
