= Linguistic frame of reference =

Linguistic feature

Linguistic frame of reference is a frame of reference as it is expressed in a language. A frame of reference is a coordinate system used to identify the physical location of an object. In languages, different frames of reference can be used. They are: the relative frame of reference, the intrinsic frame of reference, and the absolute frame of reference. Each frame of reference in a language can be associated with distinct linguistic expressions.

== Classification of frames of reference ==
=== Intrinsic frame of reference ===
Intrinsic frame of reference is a binary spatial relation in which the location of an object is defined in relation to a part of another object (its side, back, front, etc.). For instance, "The cat is in front of the house" means that the cat is at that part of the house that is its front, the side of the house that faces the street and has an entrance and maybe a porch.

=== Absolute frame of reference ===
Absolute frame of reference is also a binary system in which the location of an object is defined in relation to arbitrary fixed bearings, such as cardinal directions (North, South, East, West). For instance, “The cat is to the south of the house” has the location of the cat described independently of the position of the speaker or of any part of the house (as in intrinsic frame of reference). Apart from cardinal directions, fixed bearings such as seacoast, upriver/downriver, and uphill/downhill/across are also used.

=== Relative frame of reference ===
Relative frame of reference is a ternary system. The location of an object is expressed in relation to both the viewpoint of the perceiver and position of another object. Thus, “The cat is to the left of the house” refers to three points of reference: the cat, the house, and the perceiver himself.

== Use of different frames of reference ==
People can use multiple frames of reference in communication. For instance, in English, all three are available and used, but the use of absolute frame of reference is limited to topographic objects ("Finland is to the east of Sweden"). The preferred frame of reference is the relative one.

Languages that rely largely on absolute frame of reference include many Australian aboriginal languages (e.g., Arrernte, Guugu Yimithirr) and some Mayan languages (e.g., Tzeltal). In Guugu Yimithirr, there is no way to say "The cat is to the left of the house," and the only way to describe the location of the cat in relation to the house is "The cat is to the south of the house."

Examples of languages that rely largely on intrinsic frame of reference are Mopan (another Mayan language) or Totonac (a language cluster of the Totonacan family).

The use of different frames of reference has a far-reaching effect on cognition. For instance, to be able to communicate in a language with absolute frame of reference, speakers have to run a kind of mental compass. A remarkable neurocognitive capacity allows speakers to identify cardinal directions, even in unfamiliar locations.

== Notes and references ==
=== References ===
- Danziger, Eve (March 1996). "Parts and Their Counterparts: Spatial and Social Relationships in Mopan Maya". The Journal of the Royal Anthropological Institute. 2 (1): 67–82. doi:10.2307/3034633. JSTOR 3034633.
- Levinson, S.C. (2003). Space in language and cognition. Cambridge: Cambridge UP.
- Majid, A; Bowerman, M; Kita, S; Haun, D. B.; Levinson, S. C. (2004). "Can language restructure cognition? The case for space" (PDF). Trends in Cognitive Sciences. 8 (3): 108–114. doi:10.1016/j.tics.2004.01.003. hdl:2066/57358. PMID 15301750.
