= Misantla Totonac =

Totonacan language of Veracruz, Mexico

- Yecuatla Totonac
- Native to: Mexico
- Region: Veracruz
- Native speakers: (500 cited 1994)
- Language family: Totonacan: Totonac; Misantla Totonac

Language codes
- ISO 639-3: tlc
- Glottolog: yecu1235
- ELP: Misantla Totonac

Misantla Totonac, also known as Yecuatla Totonac and Southeastern Totonac (Totonac: Laakanaachiwíin), is an indigenous language of Mexico, spoken in central Veracruz in the area between Xalapa and Misantla. It belongs to the Totonacan family and is the southernmost variety of Totonac. Misantla Totonac is highly endangered, with fewer than 133 speakers, most of whom are elderly. The language has largely been replaced by Spanish.

== History ==
=== Genetic affiliation ===
Misantla Totonac belongs to the Totonacan language family. This family consists of two branches: Tepehua and Totonac. Misantla Totonac is the southernmost variety of Totonac. The Totonacan languages have been tentatively grouped with Mixe-Zoque as part of the Totozoquean language family. They are also included in the Amerind superfamily proposed by Joseph Greenberg, though this hypothesis is not accepted by most modern linguists.

=== Distribution and status ===
It is thought that speakers of Totonacan languages settled near the Gulf Coast around 800 CE. Although their original homeland is unknown, some have proposed that Totonacs might have founded Teotihuacan and moved to their present location after its collapse. Misantla Totonac coexisted with Spanish for many years. However, in 1974, a paved road connecting Xalapa and Misantla brought the relatively isolated Totonac-speaking region into contact with mainstream Mexican culture. As a result, Misantla Totonac is quickly being lost. Now, Totonac is mainly used with older family members and friends, and it is no longer acquired as a first language by children.

The language was formerly spoken in the area between Misantla and Xalapa in central Veracruz, but no speakers now live in either of those localities. The remaining speakers are found only in outlying towns and rural areas along the road from Xalapa to Misantla. The only town with a viable speech community is the town of Yecuatla, where 293 speakers were counted in 1990 (MacKay 1999). However, even here the population is aging. The current count of 293 speakers is a marked decrease from the 486 speakers recorded in 1980. Most of the remaining speakers are over forty-five years old, and virtually all are bilingual. As of 1999, there were no significant efforts at language revitalization.

In addition to Yecuatla, other towns with speakers of Misantla Totonac include San Marcos Atexquilapan, Landero y Coss, and Chiconquiaco. The distribution of Misantla Totonac speakers is as follows (Secretaría de Programación y Presupuesto 1992, cited in MacKay 1999):

- Yecuatla (293 speakers)
- San Marcos Atexquilapan (36 speakers)
- Landero y Coss (51 speakers)
- Chiconquiaco (24 speakers)
- Jilotepec (9 speakers)
- Miahuatlan (2 speakers)

=== Resources ===
In the eighteenth century Zambrano Bonilla published a grammar of Misantla Totonac, and Francisco Domínguez published a doctrina (catechism) of the Totonac language of Naolinco, a locality where Misantla Totonac is no longer spoken. In the 1970s, Carlo Antonio Castro compiled a list of Misantla Totonac lexical items. Beginning in the 1980s, the American linguist Carolyn MacKay has done fieldwork in Misantla Totonac speaking communities. She has published a grammar (MacKay 1999) and several articles about the language.

== Phonology ==
=== Vowels ===
Misantla Totonac has twelve phonemic vowels. There are three vowel qualities. Length is distinguished, and there is also a distinction between plain and laryngealized versions of both short and long vowels.

Vowels of Misantla Totonac
| | | Front | | Central | | Back | |
| | | short | long | short | long | short | long |
|---|---|---|---|---|---|---|---|
| High | plain | i | iː | | | u | uː |
| High | creaky | ḭ | ḭː | | | ṵ | ṵː |
| Low | plain | | | a | aː | | |
| Low | creaky | | | a̰ | a̰ː | | |

There are many minimal pairs that attest to the contrasts between long and short vowels and between plain and laryngealized vowels in Misantla Totonac. Compare [ʃkán] ("his/her child") and [ʃkáan] ("water"), which differ only in vowel length, as well as [paʃ] ("he/she bathes") and [pa̰ʃ] ("he/she threshes X"), which differ in whether the vowel is creaky or plain.

The vowel phonemes of Misantla Totonac have multiple allophones. These allophones are as follows.

- /i/ may be realized as [ɪ], [ə], [ɛ], [ɛɛ], [ɛi̯], or [ɛɘ].
- /u/ may be realized as [ɔ] or [o].
- /a/ may be realized as [ɛ], [e], or [ə].

=== Consonants ===
Misantla Totonac has sixteen consonants, shown in the chart below:

Consonants of Misantla Totonac
| | Labial | Alveolar | | Postalveolar | Palatal | Velar | Uvular | Glottal |
| | Labial | median | lateral | | Palatal | Velar | Uvular | Glottal |
|---|---|---|---|---|---|---|---|---|
| Nasal | m | n | | | | | | |
| Plosive | p | t | | | | k | q | ʔ |
| Affricate | | t͡s | | t͡ʃ | | | | |
| Fricative | | s | ɬ | ʃ | | | | h |
| Approximant | w | | l | | j | | | |

=== Syllable structure ===
The syllable in Misantla Totonac consists minimally of a vocalic nucleus and a consonantal onset. Any consonant may appear as the onset of a syllable; however, if there is no onset before the nucleus, a glottal stop /ʔ/ must be inserted. The nucleus can consist of either a short or long vowel. The optional coda may contain a maximum of two consonants. Syllable-final affricates and glides are not permitted. There are therefore many possible syllable configurations. The possible configurations may be represented as (C)CV(V)(C)(C). Consonant clusters are quite restricted in their composition, and syllable-final consonant clusters are limited to a nasal followed by a post-velar stop.

Below are examples of the various possible syllable configurations:

- CV - it is muddy, [ɫɔ.qɔ.qɔ.la̰ʔ]
- CVV - no, [láa]
- CCV - basket, [šqa̰.ta̰t]
- CCVV - long, [šqáa.nán]
- CVC - sugarcane, [čḭŋ.kat]
- CVVC - yes, [háan]
- CCVC - earth, [spát]
- CCVVC - he cries, [smáaχ.smáaχ.wán]
- CVCC - tomato, [páqɫ.ča]
- CVVCC - cave, [múu.siiŋk]
- CCVVCC - he snores, [ɫqɔɔɴʛ.nán]

=== Phonological processes ===
There are many processes that affect the realization of phonemes in Misantla Totonac. The following list provides some of the most prominent of these processes:

- Stops and affricates may be optionally voiced between voiced segments.
- /q/ may be realized as a voiceless uvular fricative [χ] after a vowel. Thus, /łuququ-la̰ʔ/ (it is muddy) may be realized as [ɫɔχɔχɔla̰ʔ].
- A nasal will assimilate to the place of articulation of a following stop or affricate. For example, /min-kḭn/ (your nose) is realized as [mɪŋkíʔ]. This example also illustrates the process whereby word-final /n/ is optionally realized as [ʔ] after a short laryngealized vowel.
- Word-final nasals undergo several changes. /m/ normally becomes [n]. /kin-kam/ (my child) therefore becomes [kíŋkán]. /n/ becomes velar [ŋ] word-finally, as in the word /škaan/ (water), which becomes [škáaŋ].
- /n/ is deleted before a continuant. /min-luu/ (your stomach word) therefore becomes [mílúu].
- [ʔ] is inserted at the beginning of a vowel-initial word. /ašnḭ/ (when, then) therefore becomes [ʔášnḭ].
- High vowels are lowered preceding and following /q/ and /h/. /łuququ-la̰ʔ/ (it is muddy) therefore becomes [ɫɔχɔχɔla̰ʔ].
- Sequences of identical consonant segments are simplified. Thus, [min-nap] (your aunt) is realized as [mínáp].
- There is a constraint against syllable-final sonorants. Syllable-final /l/ and /h/ become the obstruent [ɫ]. For example, /staqal/ (flat) becomes [staqáɫ].

=== Stress ===
Misantla Totonac has both primary and secondary stress. All heavy syllables take at least secondary stress, and possibly primary stress depending on their position within the word. The right-most stress in a word is the primary stress. Primary stress may fall on the ultimate or penultimate syllable. Verbs and nouns follow different rules for primary stress. For verbs, primary stress falls on the ultimate syllable of the word, regardless of the syllable weight. However, certain word-final inflectional suffixes never receive stress. In the case of nouns, stress falls on the penultimate syllable if the ultimate syllable is light. If the ultimate syllable is heavy, then primary stress falls on the ultimate syllable. The following examples illustrate these principles.

- [mísíksi] - your bile
- [snápṵ] - gnat
- [ɫukúk] - pierced
- [štiníitáa] - ugly

There is one exception to the above rule. Ultimate syllables closed by a coronal obstruent are not stressed. Consider the following words:

- [múkskut] - fire
- [kúčiɫ] - knife

One can argue that word-final syllables with the shape CV or CVC (if the final consonant is a coronal obstruent) are treated as extrametrical, and therefore left unstressed.

== Morphology ==
Totonac is a synthetic language, with many affixes attached to both nouns and verbs. These affixes are quite irregular, and it is common for several different affixes to serve the same function. There is a distinction between verbs and morphological statives.

=== Verbs ===
Verb roots in Totonac are classified according to transitivity. A root may be either intransitive, transitive, or ditransitive. Intransitive verbs take a single nominal argument, which is always marked by subject inflection. Transitive verbs take two arguments, which are marked by subject and object inflection. Ditransitive verbs take three arguments. Such roots are uncommon.

The Totonac verbal inflectional affixes distinguish tense, aspect, mood, person, and the number of subjects and objects. The grammatical processes involved in verbal inflection in Totonac include affixation, suppletion, and cliticization.

==== Tense ====
There are two tense categories: past and non-past. Misantla Totonac distinguishes these categories in all aspects and moods except the perfective irrealis mood. Non-past forms are indicated by a zero morpheme. The past tense morpheme is /iš-/ or /šta̰n/. In the imperfective aspect, the suffix appears in final position. In the perfective aspect, the suffix appears immediately after the verb root. The morpheme /na(ɫ)/ precedes a verb inflected in the imperfective to indicate future tense.

==== Aspect ====
Misantla Totonac distinguishes two aspectual categories: the imperfective and the perfective. The morpheme /-yaa/, inserted immediately after the verb root, indicates the imperfective aspect. The morpheme /-la(ɫ)/ or /-ti/ is placed in final position to indicate the perfective aspect.

==== Mood ====
Misantla Totonac has two categories of mood: realis and irrealis. A zero morpheme indicates the realis mood. The morpheme /ka-/ or /ni-/, placed before the verb root, indicates the irrealis mood.

==== Person marking ====
The Totonac verb agrees with its subject in person and number. Objects are obligatorily marked on the verb when there is no overt object noun phrase and optionally marked when there is one. The subject and object categories are first, second, and third person, singular and plural, the indefinite subject, and the reflexive.

Subject inflection is as follows:

- /ḭk-/ - 1st person singular
- /-ʔ/ - 2nd person singular
- Zero morpheme - 3rd person singular
- /(ik-)...-wa/ - 1st person plural
- /-tat/ - 2nd person plural
- /ta-/ - 3rd personal plural
- /-kan/ - Indefinite subject

Object inflection is as follows:

- /kin-/ - 1st person singular
- /-na/ - 2nd person singular
- /taa-/ - 2nd person singular
- /laa-/ - 3rd person plural

==== Morpheme order ====
The order of the inflectional morphemes in the Totonac verb is listed below:

1. Irrealis mood
2. 1st person singular subject or 1st person singular object
3. Past tense
4. 3rd person plural subject or 2nd person plural object
5. 3rd person plural object
6. Verb stem
7. Indefinite subject or reflexive
8. Imperfective aspect
9. 1st person plural subject or perfective mood
10. 2nd person plural subject or 2nd person singular object
11. Past tense

==== Additional verbal morphology ====
Below are some of the more frequently used verbal morphemes:

- /kii-/ - Intentional
- /-kḭḭ/ - Continuative
- /tii-/ - Leave having Xed
- /a̰-/ - Momentarily
- /lak-/ - Distributive
- /-kuhu/ - Completive
- /t͡sa̰a̰-/ - Preceding/Just
- /saa-/ - Desiderative
- /-nan/ - Become X
- /as-/ - Interrogative

=== Nouns ===
Nouns may be inflected for number and for person and number of possessors. Both processes are optional, with the exception of body-part lexemes.

Plurality can be indicated by a suffix, a prefix, or both. There are a variety of affixes that indicate plurality, the chief of which are the following:

- /lak-/ - Distributive
- /lii-/ - Appears mainly on countable nouns
- /laa-/ - Comitative
- /-ta̰n/ - Only occurs on verbs ending in variants of /-sun/, dimension.
- /-(V)(V)n/ - Plural
- /-nḭḭn/ - Some nouns are lexically specified to take this suffix.
- /-na̰/ - Occurs when a noun is consonant-final and has penultimate stress

The following prefixes mark singular possession:

- /kin-/ - 1st person singular
- /min-/ - 2nd person singular
- /iš-/ - 3rd person singular

The plural possessives are formed with the same prefixes, but with the addition of the suffix /-ka̰n/ to indicate plurality.

== Syntax ==
Word order in Misantla Totonac is extremely flexible, and very few orders are considered unacceptable. In unmarked cases, word order is verb-initial. The order is frequently VSO. The following example illustrates this verb-initial word order:

/ik-sta̰a̰-la(ɫ) ɫuw hun-kɔlčas/
1SUB-sell-PERFECTIVE many/lots DET-bedspreads
I sold lots of bedspreads.

Pragmatic effects such as focus or topicalization may cause the subject to precede the verb, as in the following sentence:

/iš-ɫaqaat ḭskḭ-la(ɫ)/
3POSS-clothes give-PERFECTIVE
He gave him his clothes.

Totonac does not explicitly mark coordination or subordination. Verbs in both types of clauses use finite verbal morphology. This is illustrated in the example below, which contains two finite verbs, one for the main clause and one for the subordinate clause:

/čis-ču-ka̰t͡si-ti hun ik-čin-la(ɫ)/
how-CL-know-2PERFECTIVE DET {1SUB-arrive here-PERFECTIVE}
How did you know that I arrived?

=== Case marking ===
Misantla Totonac marks subjective and objective case. These cases are marked on the verb. For both subjective and objective case marking, there are distinct morphemes for 1st, 2nd and 3rd person. Subjective inflectional morphemes are either prefixed or suffixed to the verb stem, as are the objective inflectional morphemes.

The following table illustrates the interaction of subject and object inflection:

Subject and Object Inflection
| | 1Obj. Singular | 1Obj. Plural | 2Obj. Singular | 2Obj. Plural | 3Obj. Singular | 3Obj. Plural |
|---|---|---|---|---|---|---|
| 1Sub. Singular | | | ik-...-na | ik-taa-...-na | ik- | ik-laa |
| 1Sub. Plural | | | (ik)taa-...-na | (ik)taa-...-na | (ik)...-wa | (ik)laa-...-wa |
| 2Sub. Singular | kin-... | kin-laa- | | | creaky | laa-creaky |
| 2Sub. Plural | kin-creaky-tat | kin-laa- | | | creaky-tat | laa-creaky-tat |
| 3Sub. Singular | kin- | kin-...-na | -na | taa-...-na | null | laa- |
| 3Sub. Plural | kin-ta- | kin-ta-...-na | ta-...-na | taa-...-na | ta- | ta-laa- |
