= Tepehua =

Tepehua may refer to:

- Tepehuas, indigenous people of Mexico
- Tepehua languages, belonging to Totonacan languages
- Tepehuán language, belonging to Uto-Aztecan languages
