= Tecpatlán Totonac =

Totonac language of central Mexico

- Native to: Mexico
- Region: Puebla
- Native speakers: (540 cited 2000 census)
- Language family: Totozoquean ?: Totonacan; Totonac; Central; Northern; Tecpatlán Totonac

Language codes
- ISO 639-3: tcw
- Glottolog: tecp1235

Tecpatlán Totonac is a Totonac language of central Mexico.
