= Ozomatlán Totonac =

Totonac language of central Mexico

Cerro Xinolatépetl Totonac
- Ozomatlán Totonac
- Western Totonac
- Native to: Mexico
- Region: Puebla
- Native speakers: (1,600 cited 2000 census)
- Language family: Totozoquean ?: Totonacan; Totonac; Central; Northern; Cerro Xinolatépetl Totonac

Language codes
- ISO 639-3: tqt
- Glottolog: west1511

Cerro Xinolatépetl Totonac, also Ozomatlán or Western Totonac, is a Totonac language of central Mexico.
