= Proto-Totonacan language =

Proto-language

Proto-Totonacan (PTn)
- Proto-Totonac-Tepehua (PTT)
- Reconstruction of: Totonacan languages

Proto-Totonacan or Proto-Totonac-Tepehua (abbreviated PTn or PTT) is the hypothetical common ancestor of the Totonacan languages of Mexico. It was first reconstructed using comparative methods in 1953 by Evangelina Arana Osnaya. Some linguists (Note: Belmar 1910; Whorf 1935; McQuown 1942, 1956; Witkowski & Brown 1978; Greenberg 1987; Campbell 1997; Brown et al. 2011, among others) have proposed a link between the Totonacan and Mixe–Zoque language families; therefore making Proto-Totonacan a sister language of Proto-Mixe–Zoque and descendant of Proto-Totozoquean.

== Phonology ==
=== Consonants ===
Proto-Totonacan consonants Arana Osnaya (1953)
		Bilabial	Alveolar			Palatal	Velar	Uvular	Glottal
		Bilabial	plain	sibilant	lateral	Palatal	Velar	Uvular	Glottal
Nasal		m	n						
Plosive/ Affricate	plain	p	t	ts	tɬ	tʃ	k	q	(ʔ)
Plosive/ Affricate	ejective	(pʼ)	(tʼ)	(tsʼ)	(tɬʼ)	(tʃʼ)	(kʼ)	(qʼ)	(ʔ)
Fricative				s	ɬ	ʃ	x		(h)
Approximant		w			l	j			

Notes

- MacKay and Trechsel (2018) add ejective stops and affricates.
- Davletshin (2008) and Brown et al. (2011) add /ʔ/ and /h/. MacKay and Trechsel (2018) accept /ʔ/ but reject /h/.

=== Vowels ===
Proto-Totonacan vowels Arana Osnaya 1953
	plain			laryngealized		
	Front	Central	Back	Front	Central	Back
Close	i iː		u uː	ḭ ḭː		ṵ ṵː
Open		a aː			a̰ a̰ː	

Notes

- Brown et al. (2011) accept this vowel inventory.
- MacKay and Trechsel (2018) reject laryngealized vowels in Proto-Totonacan. They argue that laryngealized vowels in the Totonac languages are too infrequent and erratic after fricatives and sonorants to support their reconstruction.

== Lexicon ==
The following Proto-Totonac-Tepehua reconstructions are from MacKay and Trechsel (2018).

no.	gloss	Proto-Totonac-Tepehua
1	‘spicy’	*ɬkaka
2	‘ash(es)’	*ɬk’ak’a
3	‘dances’	*ƛ’ii-ya
4	‘vomits’	*p’aƛ’an-ya
5	‘ear of corn’	*ƛ’aqƛ’a
6	‘counts’	*puuƛ’aq’i-ya
7	‘walks’	*ƛ’aawan-ya
8	‘pot’, ‘pitcher’	*ƛ’amank
9	‘bends’, ‘breaks’, ‘twists’	*taƛ’aq’i-ya
10	‘ripe’, ‘mature’	*k’aƛa’
11	‘wins’, ‘earns’	*ƛaha-ya
12	‘tires’, ‘gets tired’	*ƛaqwan-ya
13	‘talks to X’, ‘greets X’	šaqaƛii-ya
14	‘makes’, ‘does’	*ƛawa-ya
15	‘avocado tree’	*kukaƛiiɬi
16	‘nettle’	*qahni
17	‘lime (mineral)’	*qaštah
18	‘dust’, ‘powder’	*puqšni
19	‘flea’	*aq¢’iis
20	‘wasp’	*qalaati
21	‘turtle’	*qahin
22	‘knee’	*¢uqutni
23	‘tomato’	*paqɬča
24	‘plays’	qamaanan-ya
25	‘whistles’	*squli-ya
26	‘infant’, ‘baby’	*sq’at’a
27	‘heron’	*luuq’u
28	‘tongue’	*siimaq’aati
29	‘egg’	*q’aɬwaati
30	‘yucca’	*q’ušq’ihu
31	‘gourd’	*q’aaši
32	‘washes X’	*č’aq’aa-ya
33	‘salty’	*sq’uq’u
34	‘steals’, ‘steals X’	*q’aɬa-
35	‘remembers’, ‘remembers X’	*paastak’-ya
36	‘piles X up’	*maast’uq’-ya
37	‘drinks’, ‘drinks X’	*q’ut’-ya
38	‘hears’, ‘hears X’	*qašmat’-ya
39	‘returns’	*tasp’it’-ya
40	‘cuts X’	*sit’-ya
41	‘squeezes X’	*č’it’-ya
42	‘unties X’	*škut’-ya
43	‘picks X up’	*sak’-ya
44	‘writes’, ‘writes X’	*¢’uq’-ya
45	‘foam’	*puputi
46	‘neck-related (body-part prefix)’	*piš-
47	‘pig’	*p’ašni
48	‘cuts X’	*p’uš-ya
49	‘louse’	*skaata
50	‘sleeps’	*ɬtata-ya
51	‘two’	*-t’uy
52	‘sells X’	*st’aa-ya
53	‘mouth’	*kiɬni
54	‘hand-related (body-part prefix)’	*maka-
55	‘knows X’	*k’a¢ii-ya
56	‘year’	*k’aata
57	‘tooth-related (body-part prefix)’	*ta¢a-
58	‘breast’	*¢’ík’iiti
59	‘stone’	*čiwiš
60	‘sugar cane’	*č’ankati
61	‘rain’	*saʔiini
62	‘blows X’	*sunu-ya
63	‘sweet’	*saqsi(ʔ)
64	‘bitter’	*suuni
65	‘eats’	*wahin-ya
66	‘is lying down’, ‘is supine’	*maa-ɬi
67	‘lizard’	*slul
68	‘is seated’	*wii-ɬi
69	‘liver’	*ɬwak’ak’a
70	‘throws X’, ‘throws X away’	*maq’an-ya

== See also ==
- Totonacan languages
- Totozoquean languages
