= Xicotepec Totonac =

Totonac language of central Mexico

Apapantilla Totonac
- Xicotepec Totonac
- Native to: Mexico
- Region: Puebla, Veracruz
- Ethnicity: 14,000 (2000)
- Native speakers: (3,000 cited 2000)
- Language family: Totozoquean ?: Totonacan; Totonac; Central; Northern; Apapantilla Totonac
- Dialects: Zihuateutla Totonac

Language codes
- ISO 639-3: too
- Glottolog: xico1235
- ELP: Northern Totonac

Apapantilla Totonac, or Xicotepec Totonac (Xicotepec de Juárez), is a Totonac language of central Mexico. Zihuateutla Totonac may be a separate language.
