= Filomeno Mata Totonac =

Totonac language of Filomeno Mata, Veracruz, eastern Mexico

- Coahuitlán Totonac
- Native to: Mexico
- Region: Veracruz
- Native speakers: (15,100 cited 2000)
- Language family: Totozoquean ?: Totonacan; Totonac; Central Totonac; Lowland–Sierra; Filomeno Mata Totonac
- Writing system: Latin

Language codes
- ISO 639-3: tlp
- Glottolog: filo1235

Filomeno Mata Totonac is a Totonac language spoken in Filomeno Mata, Veracruz, Mexico.

== Phonology ==
=== Consonants ===
Filomeno Mata Totonac consonants
	Labial	Coronal	Dorsal	Glottal
Nasal	m	n		
Stop	(b) p	(d) t	k q	ʔ
Affricate		ts tʃ tɬ		
Fricative	(f)	s ʃ ɬ	x	
Approximant		l	j w	
Tap		(ɾ)		

- /ɾ/ is only found in Spanish loanwords
- /b/, /d/, and /f/ are only found in very recent Spanish loanwords

=== Vowels ===
Filomeno Mata Totonac vowels
	Front	Central	Back
Close	i iː		u uː
Mid	(e)		(o)
Open		a aː	

- /e/ and /o/ are only found in loanwords from Spanish and other indigenous languages
