= Pisaflores Tepehua =

Tepehua language of Veracruz, Mexico

- North Tepehua
- Native to: Mexico
- Region: Veracruz
- Native speakers: (2,500 cited 2000)
- Language family: Totonacan: Tepehua; Pisaflores Tepehua

Language codes
- ISO 639-3: tpp
- Glottolog: pisa1237
- ELP: Pisaflores Tepehua

Pisaflores Tepehua is a Tepehua language of Veracruz, Mexico. It is spoken in the towns of Ixhuatlán de Madero and Pisaflores.

== Phonology ==
=== Consonants ===
Pisaflores Tepehua consonants
		Labial	Alveolar		Alveo- palatal	Palatal	Velar	Glottal
		Labial	median	lateral	Alveo- palatal	Palatal	Velar	Glottal
Nasal		m	n					
Stop	pulmonic	p	t				k	ʔ
Stop	ejective	pʼ	tʼ				kʼ	
Affricate	pulmonic		ts		tɕ			
Affricate	ejective		tsʼ		tɕʼ			
Fricative			s	ɬ	ɕ			h
Approximant		w		l		j		

=== Vowels ===
Pisaflores Tepehua vowels
	Front	Central	Back
Close	i iː		u uː
Mid	e eː		o oː
Open		a aː	

=== Phonotactics ===
Pisaflores Tepehua syllable structure is summarized by MacKay and Treschel (2013) as:

- C_{1} (C_{2}) V (C_{3} (C_{4}))

That is, Pisaflores Tepehua syllables must start with a consonant or two-consonant cluster, have one vowel sound, and may end without consonants or with a consonant or two-consonant cluster.

Phonological restrictions apply:

- Onset
  1. C_{1} can be any consonant
  2. C_{2} can only exist if and only if C_{1} is a fricative (/s/, /ɕ/, /ɬ/)
  3. C_{2} cannot be a fricative or affricate (/s/, /ɕ/, /ɬ/, /ts/, /tɕ/, /tsʼ/, /tɕʼ/)
  4. If C_{1} = /ɬ/, then C_{2} cannot be a lateral (/ɬ/, /l/)
- Nucleus
  1. V can be any vowel, long or short
- Coda
  1. C_{3} can be any consonant that is not an affricate (/ts/, /tɕ/, /tsʼ/, /tɕʼ/)
  2. C_{3} can be a bilabial stop (/p/, /pʼ/) in syllable-final positions, but never in word-final positions
  3. C_{4} can only exist if and only if C_{3} = /k/ or C_{3} = /ʔ/
  4. C_{4} can only be /s/, /ɕ/, or /ɬ/ if C_{3} = /k/
  5. C_{4} can only be /s/ or /ɕ/ if C_{3} = /ʔ/
