= Huehuetla Tepehua =

Tepehua language of Mexico

- Lhiimaqalhqama7
- Native to: Mexico
- Region: northeastern Hidalgo, Mexico
- Native speakers: 1,500 (2007)
- Language family: Totonacan: Tepehua; Huehuetla Tepehua

Language codes
- ISO 639-3: tee
- Glottolog: hueh1236
- ELP: Huehuetla Tepehua

Huehuetla Tepehua is a moribund Tepehua language spoken in Huehuetla, northeastern Hidalgo, Mexico. There are fewer than 1,500 speakers left according to Susan Smythe Kung (2007).

== Syntax ==
Word order tends to be VSO, although it can be SVO at times (Kung 2007).

== Phonology ==
=== Consonants ===
Huehuelta Tepehua has 26 consonant phonemes.The following table lists these phonemes and uses Kung's practical orthography in angled brackets.

Consonant phonemes
| | | Labial | Alveolar | | | Post- alveolar | Velar | Uvular | Glottal |
| | | Labial | plain | sibilant | lateral | Post- alveolar | Velar | Uvular | Glottal |
|---|---|---|---|---|---|---|---|---|---|
| Nasal | | m ⟨m⟩ | n ⟨n⟩ | | | | | | |
| Stop/ Affricate | plain | p ⟨p⟩ | t ⟨t⟩ | ts ⟨tz⟩ | | tʃ ⟨ch⟩ | k ⟨k⟩ | q ⟨q⟩ | ʔ ⟨7⟩ |
| Stop/ Affricate | ejective | pʼ ⟨p'⟩ | tʼ ⟨t'⟩ | tsʼ ⟨tz'⟩ | | tʃʼ ⟨ch'⟩ | kʼ ⟨k'⟩ | | |
| Stop/ Affricate | voiced | (b) | (d) | | | | (g) | | |
| Fricative | | | | s ⟨s⟩ | ɬ ⟨lh⟩ | ʃ ⟨x⟩ | | | h ⟨j⟩ |
| Approximant | | w ⟨w⟩ | | | l ⟨l⟩ | j ⟨y⟩ | | | |
| Trill | | | r ⟨rr⟩ | | | | | | |
| Flap | | | ɾ ⟨r⟩ | | | | | | |

The voiced stops /b/, /d/, and /g/, as well as the flap /ɾ/ and the trill /r/, appear only in loanwords and ideophones.

In younger speakers, the uvular /q/ has merged with the glottal stop /ʔ/. Based on fieldwork from previous linguists and interviews with modern speakers, Kung theorizes that /qʼ/ merged into /q/ between 1945 and 1984. When Kung began her fieldwork in 1999, /q/ was only consistently found in speakers over 65.

=== Vowels ===
Hueheutla Tepehua has ten phonemic vowels. Earlier stages of the language only had six, with /e, i/, /eː, iː/, /o, u/, and /oː, uː/ in complimentary distribution.

Vowel Phonemes
| | Front | | Central | | Back | |
|---|---|---|---|---|---|---|
| High | i ⟨i⟩ | iː ⟨ii⟩ | | | u ⟨u⟩ | uː ⟨uu⟩ |
| Mid | e ⟨e⟩ | eː ⟨ee⟩ | | | o ⟨o⟩ | oː ⟨oo⟩ |
| Low | | | a ⟨a⟩ | aː ⟨aa⟩ | | |

== Morphology ==
Huehuetla Tepehua has a large variety of affixes.

Valency-changing affixes

- Reflexive -kan
- Reciprocal laa-
- Dative -ni
- Causative maa-
- Instrumental puu-
- Comitative t'aa-
- Applicative lhii-

Aspectual derivational affixes

- Inchoative ta-
- Imminent ti-
- Roundtrip kii-
- Ambulative -t'ajun
- Begin -tzuku
- Desiderative -putun
- Repetitive -pala
- Again -choqo
- All -qoju
- Distal -chaa
- Proximal -chii

Derivative affixes

- Agent nominalizer –nV7
- Non-agentive nominalizers –ti and -nti
- Deverbalizer -n
- Instrumental paa- and lhaa-
- Locative puu-
- Applicative lhii-
- Comitative t'aa-

== Sources ==
- Kung, Susan Smythe (2007). A Descriptive Grammar of Huehuetla Tepehua (Ph.D. thesis). The University of Texas at Austin.
