= Tlachichilco Tepehua =

Tepehua language of Veracruz, Mexico

- West Tepehua
- Native to: Mexico
- Region: Veracruz
- Native speakers: (3,000 cited 1990)
- Language family: Totonacan: Tepehua; Tlachichilco Tepehua

Language codes
- ISO 639-3: tpt
- Glottolog: tlac1235
- ELP: Tlachichilco Tepehua

Tlachichilco Tepehua is a Tepehua language of Veracruz, Mexico.

== Phonology ==
=== Vowels ===
	Front	Central	Back
Close	i iː		u uː
Mid	e eː		o oː
Open		a aː	

=== Consonants ===
		Labial	Alveolar		Alveolo- palatal	Velar	Uvular	Glottal
		Labial	median	lateral	Alveolo- palatal	Velar	Uvular	Glottal
Nasal		m	n					
Plosive	voiceless	p	t			k	q	ʔ
Plosive	ejective	pʼ	tʼ			kʼ	(qʼ)	ʔ
Affricate	voiceless		t͡s		t͡ɕ			
Affricate	ejective		t͡sʼ		t͡ɕʼ			
Rhotic			(ɾ, r)					
Fricative			s	ɬ	ɕ			h
Approximant		w		l	j			

- The uvular ejective [qʼ] is only phonemically present in other dialects.
- Rhotic sounds [ɾ, r] only occur from either Spanish loan words or onomatopoetic words.
