= Chitimacha language =

Language isolate of southern Louisiana, US

Chitimacha
- Sitimaxa, Čitimaaša
- Pronunciation: [t͡ʃitimaːʃa]
- Native to: USA
- Region: Southern Louisiana
- Ethnicity: Chitimacha
- Extinct: 1940, with the death of Delphine Ducloux
- Revival: learned by children through immersion program
- Language family: Language isolate

Language codes
- ISO 639-3: ctm
- Glottolog: chit1248
- ELP: Chitimacha
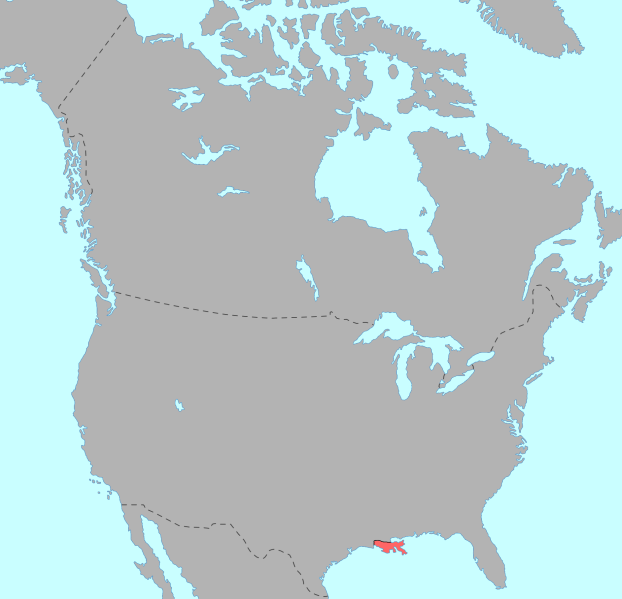
- Historical distribution of Chitimacha language

Chitimacha (/ˌtʃɪtɪməˈʃɑː/ CHIT-i-mə-SHAH or /tʃɪtɪˈmɑːʃə/ chit-i-MAH-shə, Sitimaxa) is a language isolate historically spoken by the Chitimacha people of Louisiana, United States. It became extinct in 1940 with the death of the last fluent speaker, Delphine Ducloux.

Although no longer spoken, it is fairly extensively documented by the linguists' work (mostly unpublished) of Morris Swadesh and John R. Swanton. Swadesh, in particular, wrote a full grammar and dictionary and collected numerous texts from the last two speakers although none of that has been published.

Language revitalization efforts are underway to teach the language to a new generation of speakers. Tribal members have received Rosetta Stone software to learn the language. As of 2015, a new Chitimacha dictionary is in preparation, and classes are being taught on the Chitimacha reservation.

== Classification ==
Chitimacha, though conventionally regarded as a language isolate, has recently been proposed to be related to or a member of the proposed Totozoquean language family. Those proposals have not been accepted by the wider linguistic community. An automated computational analysis (ASJP 4) by Müller et al. (2013) found lexical similarities between Chitimacha, Huave, and Totozoquean. However, since the analysis was automatically generated, the grouping could be from either mutual lexical borrowing or genetic inheritance.

An earlier, more speculative, proposal suggested an affinity with the also-hypothetical Gulf language family.

== History ==
Chitimacha was spoken in modern-day Louisiana. The first resources on Chitimacha were collected in 1802 by a man named Murray and an unknown Chitimacha speaker in Franklin, Louisiana. In the 1820s and 1830s the wordlist was expanded by linguist Peter Duponceau, his work later being published in Paris. Around 40 years later, linguist Alfred Gatschet worked with Baptiste Angélique in Charenton, Louisiana. Angélique was a black man who had grown up near the Chitimacha reservation. Angélique spoke it as his first language, although he was not of Chitimacha ancestry.

The last two fluent speakers of Chitimacha were Chief Benjamin Paul and Delphine Decloux Stouff. Paul died in 1932 and Stouff in 1940, marking the language's extinction. The linguists Morris Swadesh and John R. Swanton have written extensively about Chitimacha. Swadesh, in particular, wrote a full grammar and dictionary of Chitimacha with his wife Mary Haas. He also recorded 200 hours of conversations with the last fluent speakers.

Language revitalization efforts are underway to teach the language to a new generation of speakers, based mainly on resources compiled between 1802 and 1934. Tribal members have received Rosetta Stone software to learn the language. As of 2015, a new Chitimacha dictionary is in preparation, and classes are being taught on the Chitimacha reservation.

== Phonology ==
Brown, Wichmann, and Beck (2014) give the following phonemic inventory based on Morris Swadesh's 1939 analysis.

Consonants
		Bilabial	Alveolar	Post- alveolar	Palatal	Velar	Glottal
Nasal		m	n				
Plosive	voiceless	p	t			k	ʔ
Plosive	glottalized	pʼ	tʼ			kʼ	ʔ
Affricate	voiceless		t͡s	t͡ʃ			
Affricate	glottalized		t͡sʼ	t͡ʃʼ			
Fricative			s	ʃ			h
Approximant		w			j		

Chitimacha's consonant inventory is unique among the indigenous languages of the American southeast in that it has ejective consonants. When plain plosives are followed by a glottal stop in word-formation processes, they too become ejectives. The words guxti 'to eat' and qatin 'large' become guxdatin 'glutton' when combined (the letter d represents the ejective tʼ).

The glottal fricative /h/ becomes a velar fricative [x] word-finally and preceding another consonant. Examples include huuh 'lake' (said [hu:x]) and nahtpa 'stick basket' (said [nɑ̃xtpɑ]). Initial /h/ is deleted when the word it belongs to is the second component of a compound word.

Vowels
	Front	Central	Back
Close	i iː		u uː
Mid	e eː	ə	o oː
Open		ɑ ɑː	

The vowels of Chitimacha have a length contrast, meaning they can be short or long in duration. Short vowels are deleted when they are stem-final and a suffix is added to the end. For instance, waxta 'day' and heijin 'holy' become waxteijin 'Sunday' when combined.

Chitimacha also has allophonic nasalization. Word-final vowels are nasalized following a nasal consonant. Elsewhere in a word, only the vowels /ɑ ɑ: e e:/ are nasalized adjacent to nasal consonants. For example, the word xam 'new' would be pronounced [ʃɑ̃m]. Nasalization also occurs when two identical vowels are separated by the glottals /ʔ h/ (see rhinoglottophilia). The word qeehe 'yes' is pronounced [ʔẽːhẽ], with both vowels being nasalized.

=== Intonation ===
Statements in Chitimacha have rising intonation, whereas questions have falling intonation. This is rare cross-linguistically (and is the opposite of English intonation patterns) but is also attested in Chickasaw.

=== Syllable structure ===
Syllables can be maximally CVCC, with no diphthongs (different from long monophthongs) allowed. Chitimacha is a fixed-stress language, with the first syllable always bearing primary stress. In words of three or more syllables, the final syllable bears secondary stress.

== Orthography ==
Transcription has been done by researchers in a number of orthographies, including French, Spanish, and Americanist. Members of the Chitimacha tribe have developed a practical orthography using the Latin alphabet that does not use diacritics or special characters and retains elements of the orthography that had been used by Swadesh.

Chitimacha orthography
Practical	Americanist	IPA
a	ɑ	ɑ
aa	ɑ:	ɑː
b	pʼ	pʼ
c	č	t͡ʃ
d	tʼ	tʼ
dz	cʼ	t͡sʼ
k	k	k
e	e	e
ee	e:	eː
g	kʼ	kʼ
h	h	h
i	i	i
ii	i:	iː
j	čʼ	t͡ʃʼ
m	m	m
mq	mʼ	mʼ
n	n	n
nq	nʼ	nʼ
o	o	o
oo	o:	oː
p	p	p
q	ʔ	ʔ
s	s	s
t	t	t
ts	c	t͡s
u	u	u
uu	u:	uː
w	w	w
x	š	ʃ
y	y	j

== Grammar ==
Chitimacha has a grammatical structure that is not dissimilar from modern Indo-European languages but is still quite distinctive. Chitimacha distinguishes several word classes: verbs, nouns, adjectives (verbal and nominal), quantifiers, and demonstratives. Swadesh (1946) states that the remaining word classes are difficult to distinguish but may be divided "into proclitics, postclitics, and independent particles." Chitimacha has auxiliary verbs (such as the English "to be"), which are inflected for tense, aspect, and mood. Polar interrogatives may be marked with a final falling intonation and a clause-final postposition.

Chitimacha does not appear to have adopted any grammatical features from its interactions with French, Spanish, or English.

=== Pronouns ===
Verbs are inflected for person and number of the subject. Ambiguity may be avoided by the use of the personal pronouns (shown in the table below), but sentences without personal pronouns are common. There is no gender for personal pronouns and verbal indexes. The subject and object personal pronouns are identical.

Chitimacha pronouns
	singular	plural
1st person	qix [ʔiš]	qux [ʔuš]
2nd person	him(q) [himʔ]	was [was]
3rd person	hus [hus]	hunks [hunks]

Pronouns are more restricted than nouns in possessive constructions and, unlike nouns, cannot be preceded by possessives.

=== Nouns ===
There are definite articles in Chitimacha. Nouns are mostly uninflected, and there are only approximately 30 of them (referring mostly to kinship or persons) which mark a plural form by a suffix or other formations.

Nouns are free or may juxtapose the possessor and the possessed noun.

ʔiš ʔinž̹i = my father ("I father")

was ʔasi ʔinž̹i = that man's father ("that man father")

== Sample text ==
The following sentences and translations are from the book "Modern Chitimacha (Sitimaxa)" (2008), endorsed by the Chitimata Tribal government's Cultural Department.

Qix susbi qix gãmpi nẽ gaptk, huupup cuug, huutãnki nahpiig, gastãnk hup nãxmiig cuug, juqunk kãmcin getiki
My gun my ammunition and taking, lake+to going, boat-in over-crossing north to hunting going, soon deer I+struck
"Taking my gun and my ammunition and going toward the lake, I crossed over in a boat and hunted toward the north, where I soon killed a deer."

We nux gaptk, him susbi wey hix hi kaatẽmiig, wetk nãxmiig cuucuux, qaxtkãnki qoonãk qun kun getsuy
That stone taking, your gun that with thither rubbing, then hunting if+you+go, then soon some thing you+will+kill
"If you take that stone and rub your gun with it and then go hunting, you will soon kill something."

Hãnã hup cuyqi, nẽncuu waaksti hi qehiqi
House to he+went too late thither he+arrived
"He went to the house, but he arrived too late."

== Sources ==
- Brown, Cecil H.; Wichmann, Søren; Beck, David (2014). "Chitimacha: a Mesoamerican language in the Lower Mississippi Valley". International Journal of American Linguistics. 80 (4): 425–474. doi:10.1086/677911. JSTOR 10.1086/677911. S2CID 145538166.
- "Chitimacha Language and the Chitimacha Indian Tribe (Chitamacha, Chetimacha, Shetimasha)". Native Languages.
- Swanton, John Reed (1919). A structural and lexical comparison of the Tunica, Chitimacha, and Atakapa languages. Govt. Printing Office.
- Toomey, Thomas Noxon (1914). Relationships of the Chitimachan Linguistic Family. Hervas Laboratories.
