= Pisaflores =

- Town and municipality
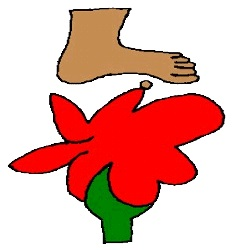
- Coat of arms

- Location within Hidalgo Location within Mexico
- Coordinates: 21°11′36″N 99°0′18″W
- Country: Mexico
- State: Hidalgo
- Municipality: Pisaflores

Government
  - Federal electoral district: Hidalgo's 2nd

Area
  - Total: 159.3 km^{2} (61.5 sq mi)

Population (2005)
  - Total: 17,214
- Time zone: UTC-6 (Zona Centro)
- Postal code: 42220
- Area code: 771
- Website: pisaflores.gob.mx

Pisaflores is a town is the north-west of the Mexican state of Hidalgo. It serves as the municipal seat for the surrounding municipality of the same name.

The municipality covers an area of 159.3 km^{2} (61.5 sq mi) and, as of 2020, had a population of 18,723 (up from 17,214 in 2005). It is located in the state's Huasteca region, bordering the states of Querétaro and San Luis Potosí.

Pisaflores also has Tepehuas who are Eastern Orthodox Christians. (Sandstrom 2005)
