= Paso del Correo, Veracruz =

Paso Del Correo
- Town
- Paso Del Correo
- Location in Mexico
- Coordinates: 20°26′52″N 97°19′12″W
- Country: Mexico
- State: Veracruz
- Founded: 13th century
- Town status: 1880

Area
  - Total: 1,199.26 km^{2} (463.04 sq mi)
- Elevation (of seat): 180 m (590 ft)

Population (2005) Belongs to the municipality of Papantla, Veracruz
- Population
- 1,240
- Time zone: UTC-6 (CST)
- Postal code (of seat): 93400
- Website: (in Spanish) municipiopapantla.gob.mx

Paso del Correo is a town southeast of Papantla, Veracruz. Its population is 1240 people. It is also a part of the municipality of Papantla. This used to be part of the Totonac civilization, but in 2011 only 154 people had indigenous roots. The town is very small, with only 292 living units. Many kids do not have access to good education because they become farmers at a very early age. The weather in Paso Del Correo is hot, warm, and tropical throughout the year. It is to the southwest of the Rio Tecolutla.
