= Totonacan languages =

Language family of eastern Mexico

Totonacan
- Totonac–Tepehua
- Geographic distribution: Mexico
- Linguistic classification: Totozoquean ?: Totonacan
- Proto-language: Proto-Totonacan
- Subdivisions: Tepehua; Totonac

Language codes
- Glottolog: toto1251

The Totonacan languages (also known as Totonac–Tepehua languages) are a family of closely related languages spoken by approximately 290,000 Totonac (approx. 280,000) and Tepehua (approx. 10,000) people in the states of Veracruz, Puebla, and Hidalgo in Mexico. At the time of the Spanish conquest Totonacan languages were spoken all along the gulf coast of Mexico. During the colonial period, Totonacan languages were occasionally written and at least one grammar was produced. In the 20th century the number of speakers of most varieties have dwindled as indigenous identity increasingly became stigmatized encouraging speakers to adopt Spanish as their main language.

The Totonacan languages have only recently been compared to other families on the basis of historical-comparative linguistics, though they share numerous areal features with other languages of the Mesoamerican Linguistic Area, such as the Mayan languages and Nahuatl. Recent work suggests a possible genetic link to the Mixe–Zoque language family, although this has yet to be firmly established.

== Internal classification ==
The family is divided into two branches, Totonac and Tepehua. Of the two, Tepehua is generally considered to consist of three languages—Pisaflores, Huehuetla, and Tlachichilco—while the Totonac branch is considerably more diverse. MacKay (1999) divides Totonac into four divisions, based on García Rojas (1978):

- Papantla Totonac: spoken in El Escolín, Papantla, Cazones, Tajín, Espinal, and other towns along the Gulf Coast of Veracruz.
- North-Central Totonac: spoken roughly between Poza Rica in Veracruz and Mecapalapa, Pantepec, and Xicotepec de Juárez in Puebla.
- South-Central Totonac: spoken mostly in the Sierra Norte de Puebla, including the towns of Zapotitlán de Méndez, Coatepec, and Huehuetla in Puebla.
- Misantla Totonac: spoken in Yecuatla and other communities outside the city of Misantla.

As of 2023, Ethnologue recognizes 12 languages in the Totonacan family, three Tepehua languages and nine Totonac. This classification is the basis of the latest version of the ISO language codes for Totonacan, although some of these classifications are disputed.

Language	ISO code	Locations	Number of speakers
Huehuetla Tepehua	tee	Huehuetla, northeast Hidalgo; Mecapalapa, Puebla	3,000 (1982 SIL)
Pisaflores Tepehua	tpp	Pisaflores, Hidalgo; Ixhuatlán de Madero, Veracruz	4,000 (1990 census)
Tlachichilco Tepehua	tpt	Tlachichilco, Veracruz	3,000 (1990 SIL)
Papantla Totonac	top	Around Papantla, central lowland Veracruz	80,000 (1982 SIL)
Coyutla Totonac	toc	Coyutla, Veracruz	48,000 (2000 WCD)
Highland Totonac	tos	Around Zacatlán, Puebla, and Veracruz	120,000 (1982 SIL)
Filomeno Mata Totonac	tlp	The town of Filomeno Mata, highland Veracruz, adjacent to Highland Totonac	15,000 (2000 WCD)
Xicotepec Totonac	too	In 30 villages around Xicotepec de Juárez in the Sierra Norte de Puebla and Veracruz	3,000 (2000 SIL)
Ozumatlán Totonac	tqt	Ozumatlán, Tepetzintla, Tlapehuala and San Agustín in northern Puebla	1,800 (1990 census)
Misantla Totonac	tlc	Yecuatla and Misantla in southern Veracruz	500 (1994 SIL)
Upper Necaxa Totonac	tku	Patla, Chicontla, Cacahuatlán and San Pedro Tlaloantongo in northeastern Puebla	3,400 (2000 INEGI)
Tecpatlán Totonac	tcw	Tecpatlán, northeastern Puebla	540 (2000 INEGI)

The Mexican Instituto Nacional de Lenguas Indígenas (INALI) recognizes 10 distinct languages or "linguistic variants" in the family, 3 Tepehua and 7 Totonac

Language	population (2005 census)
Western Tepehua (also known as Tlachichiloco)	9,200
Northern Tepehua (also known as Pisaflores)	2,800
Southern Tepehua (also known as Huehuetla)	1,800
Southeastern Totonac (also known as Misantla)	490
Coastal (also known as Papantla)	58,200
North Central (also known as Xicotepec)	15,100
South Central (also known as Highland)	114,900
High Central (also known as Filomeno Mata)	8,700
Cerro del Xinolatépetl (also known as Ozumatlán)	1,000
Upper Necaxa	3,300

Coyutla Totonac is grouped with South Central Totonac by INALI while Tecpatlán Totonac is included in the North Central Totonac group. Other recent attempts at classification have suggested that some of these divisions, particularly North Central, Costal, and South Central, and are far too broad and include varieties that might also be classified as separate languages.

A further drawback of the Ethnologue and INALI classifications is the lack of lower-level subgroups beyond the two-way division into Totonac and Tepehua. In the Totonac branch of the family, Misantla is the most distinctive, and the remaining languages form a more closely related group. Divisions amongst the latter group, which might be referred to as "Central Totonac," are unclear, though most researchers agree that there is at least a three-way division between Northern, Southern/Sierra, and Lowland/Coastal varieties. Recent efforts at reconstruction and evidence from lexical similarity further suggest that Southern/Sierra and Lowland group together against Northern, although this is still uncertain, pending more exhaustive investigation. The most recent proposal for the family is as follows:

- Tepehua
  - Pisaflores
  - Huehuetla
  - Tlachichilco
- Totonac
  - Misantla
  - Central Totonac
    - Northern Totonac
      - Upper Necaxa
      - Tecpatlán Totonac
      - Zihuateutla Totonac
      - Cerro Xinolatépetl Totonac (also known as Ozumatlán)
      - Apapantilla Totonac (also known as Xicotepec)
    - Lowland–Sierra
      - Filomeno Mata
      - Lowland Totonac (many varieties, incl. Papantla)
      - Sierra Totonac (also known as Highland Totonac)
        - Coatepec
        - Coyutla
        - Huehuetla Totonac
        - Ozelonacaxtla
        - Olintla
        - Zapotitlán de Méndez

Lexical comparison also suggests that, for Tepehua, Pisaflores and Huehuetla may be more closely related to each other than either is to Tlalchichilco.

MacKay and Trechsel (2018) provide the following internal classification:

Totonac-Tepehua

- Totonac
  - Sierra Totonac: Zapotitlán, Coatepec, Huehuetla (Chilocoyo del Carmen), Caxhuácan, Ozelonacaxtla
  - Papantla Totonac: El Escolín, El Tajín, El Carbón, Papantla
  - Northern Totonac: Apapantilla, Patla, Chicontla, Cacahuatlán, Filomeno Mata, San Pedro Tlaolantongo
  - Misantla Totonac: Yecuatla, San Marcos Atexquilapan, Jilotepec
- Tepehua
  - Tlachichileo Tepehua: Tlachichileo, Tierra Colorada, Chintipán, Tecomajapa
  - Pisaflores Tepehua: Pisaflores, El Tepetate, San Pedro Tziltzacuapan, San José el Salto
  - Huehuetla Tepehua: Huehuetla (Hidalgo), Barrio Atzlán, Linda Vista (Mirasol), Mecapalapa (Puebla)

== Phonology ==
There is some variation in the sound systems of the different varieties of Totonac and Tepehua, but the following phoneme inventory can be considered a typical Totonacan inventory.

=== Consonants ===
	Labial	Alveolar		Palatal	Velar	Uvular	Glottal
	Labial	median	lateral	Palatal	Velar	Uvular	Glottal
Nasal	m	n					
Plosive	p	t			k	q	(ʔ)
Affricate		ts	tɬ	tʃ			
Fricative		s	ɬ	ʃ	x		h
Approximant			l	j	w		

This consonant inventory is essentially equivalent to that reconstructed for proto-Totonacan by Arana Osnaya (1953, with the exception of the two back fricatives, /x/ and /h/. Most modern languages phonemically have only one of these, but show some allomorphic variation between the two, with one or the other being considered basic. However, Coatepec Totonac is reported to have both phonemes, and more recent reconstructions of the proto-Totonacan consonant inventory have proposed that both were present in that language. The glottal stop is a marginal phoneme in most of the languages and is posited primarily for morphological reasons. The phonological system is fairly typical of Mesoamerica.

=== Vowels ===
Most Totonacan languages have a three-vowel system with each quality making distinctions of length and laryngealization. The following is the "typical" Totonacan vocalic inventory.

Totonacan vowels
	Front		Central		Back	
	creaky	plain	creaky	plain	creaky	plain
Close	ḭ ḭː	i iː			ṵ ṵː	u uː
Open			a̰ a̰ː	a aː		

Tepehua has lost the phonemic laryngealization of vowels and has ejective stops where Totonac has creaky vowels preceded by stops. Some Totonac languages have five-vowel systems, having developed /e/ and /o/ phonemes, whereas in others [e] and [o] are clearly allomorphs of /i/ and /u/, respectively, conditioned by proximity to uvular stops or fricatives.

== Grammar ==
From a typological perspective, the Totonac–Tepehua family presents a fairly consistent profile, and exhibits many features of the Mesoamerican areal type, such as a preference for verb-initial order, head-marking, and extensive use of body part morphemes in metaphorical and locative constructions. The Totonacan languages are highly agglutinative and polysynthetic with nominative/accusative alignment and a flexible constituent order governed by information structure. Syntactic relations between the verb and its arguments are marked by agreement with the subject and one or sometimes two objects. There is no morphological case on nouns and many languages in the family lack prepositions, making use instead of a rich system of causatives, applicatives, and prefixes for body parts and parts of objects. Possession is marked on the possessed noun, the head of the NP. Otherwise, nouns are uninflected, number being an optional category and grammatical gender being absent from the languages. Numerals quantifying nouns bear classificatory prefixes, something that is unusual cross-linguistically as affixal classifiers tend heavily to be suffixes. Totonacan languages are also known for their use of sound symbolism.

=== Causatives and applicatives ===
Totonacan languages have a wide assortment of morphemes for increasing the valency of a verb.

==== Causatives ====
All Totonacan languages have at least one causative morpheme, a prefix ma:-:

Filomeno Mata Totonac

tiː=nuː š-ta-maː-aq-stuq-maː-na aqšáːq
REL:H=ahora PAST-3PL.SUB-CAUS-head-gathered-PROG-3PL head
‘those who were gathering heads’

Pisaflores Tepehua

čaʔan-ɬi maa-lakȼ’in lii-ta-maa-ɬkuula-taa(ɬ)=ča
arrive.there-PFV EVI-see COMP-3PL.SUB-CAUS-burn-PF=CL
‘He got there and saw that they had made a fire.’

In many of the languages, the causative prefix is regularly or obligatorily associated with a suffix:

Upper Necaxa Totonac

tsa̰x ḭk-maː-ka̰tsíː-niː-yaː-n mat wan
just 1SG.SUB-CAUS-know-CAUS-IMPF-2OBJ QTV say
‘ “I'm just letting you know”, he says.’

In some languages like Upper Necaxa, the suffix is analyzed as part of the causative morpheme, but in others it is treated as a separate transitivizer.

==== Dative/benefactive applicative ====
One of the most frequently used valency-increasing affixes in the Totonacan languages is the dative or benefactive suffix:

Ozelonacaxtla Totonac

na-lḭːn-ni-ka̰n i tʃu ʃ-tʃuh
FUT-take-BEN-INDEF.SUB JNCT PTCL 3PO-tortilla
‘They will take him his food.’

Cerro Xinolatépetl Totonac

ta-maqá̰n-ni-lḭ čúčut nak=šušúm
3PL.SUB-throw-BEN-PFV water LOC=piedra
‘They threw water for her on the hot stones.’

==== Comitative applicative ====
All the languages of the family have a comitative construction in which both an actor and a co-actor of a verb are specified. For instance, in Huehuetla Tepehua a verb such as tamakahuːn 'stay, be in a place' is intransitive but can take a comitative prefix to form a verb ta̰ːtamakahuːn meaning 'stay with someone', someone being the co-actor:

Huehuetla Tepehua

haː laː-y k-ʔa-lak-t’aː-tamakahuːn
INT poder-IMPF 1SUB-PL-3PL.OBJ-COM-quedar:PFV
‘Can I stay with you guys?’

Similarly, the Papantla Totonac verb muxuː ‘bury something’ is transitive but becomes ditransitive when it takes the comitative prefix:

Papantla Totonac

na-k-ta̰ː-muxuː-yaː-n
FUT-1SUB-COM-meterlo-IMPF-2OBJ
‘I will bury her with you’

==== Instrumental applicative ====
The third applicative prefix that is shared across the family is analyzed in most of the languages as an instrumental applicative and is used to add an object used as an instrument or a means to a clause:

Olintla Totonac

INTJ liː-láq-paqɬ-ɬi tʃíwiʃ ta-laq-pítsi-ɬi
INTJ INST-DST-break-PFV stone INCH-DST-split-PFV
‘So he broke the rock with it, it was split.’

Misantla Totonac

kit čaa=ču ut ik-lii-ta-riku-la(ɬ) wḭn-ɬkak̰ maa-wan
I just=CL that 1SUB-INST-INCH-rich-PFV this-ash EVI-say
‘ “I just got rich with (i.e. selling) those ashes”, he says.’

In some of the languages, the instrumental can also be used for the expression of motives:

Upper Necaxa Totonac

ʔeː čuːnúː paɬ tsḭnʔs-ya̰ liː-ta̰sá-ya̰ pus
and so if be.hungry-IMPF:2SG.SUB INST-vocalize-IMPF:2SG.SUB INTJ
‘ “And if you're hungry, that's why you cry out, then.’

Tlachichilco Tepehua

porke laq-ɬuw tumin ɬiː-k’uč’u-kan-ɬ
because CLF-much money DIR-cure-PASS-PFV
‘Because they cured him for a lot of money.’

As seen in the last example, this prefix is ɬi- in Tepehua languages rather than liː- as it is in Totonac, and in Tlachichilco and Huehuetla it is analyzed as a directional ("DIR") rather than an instrumental. The prefix seems to be less frequent in Tepehua than in Totonac.

=== Body-part prefixation ===
The Totonacan languages exhibit a phenomenon similar to noun incorporation whereby special prefixing combining forms of body-parts may be added to verbs. When these prefixes are added, they generally serve to delimit the verb's locus of affect; that is, they indicate which part of the subject or object is affected by the action.

Huehuetla Tepehua

waː naː maː laʔapuː-tanuː-y š-laʔapuːtanuːti
FOC ENF RPT face-put.in-IMPF 3PO-mask
‘He put the mask on his face.’

The prefixes can also be used to specify the shape of an affected object:

Papantla Totonac

an-li tuku wan-ni-kan ča̰ː-ka̰ː tasun
go-PFV what say-BEN-INDEF.SUB shin-cut birch
‘He went to, what do you call it?, cut a birch tree,’

It is worthwhile to note that the prefixation does not decrease the valency of the verb, differentiating this process from true noun incorporation as the term is usually understood.

Another important role that bodypart prefixes play in Totonacan languages is in the formulation of expressions of the spatial location of objects, which combine a part-prefix with one of four posture verbs (words for ’sit’, ‘stand’, ‘lie’, and ‘be high’):

Upper Necaxa Totonac

ta-a̰kpuː-wila-nan-ɬ čiwíš spuːn-niːn
3PL.SUB-crown-sit-PL-PFV stone bird-PL
‘the birds are sitting on the rock’

These constructions alternate with expressions using the independent (full) form of the part as a preposition-like element:

Upper Necaxa Totonac

líbɾu ḭš-a̰kpúː-n mesa wiːɬ
book 3PO-crown-NM table sit
‘the book is on the table’

In the last sentence, the independent form of a̰kpuː- 'crown' is formed by combining this prefix with a base -n which is sometimes (as here) analyzed as a nominalizing suffix. Because words for body parts are inflected for possession, a̰kpuːn 'crown' has a third-person singular possessive prefix, linking it to mesa 'table', the object on whose crown the book is located (see the section below on Possessive constructions).

=== Possessive constructions ===
Possessive constructions in Totonacan languages are marked on the possessed noun rather than on the possessor noun:

Upper Necaxa Totonac

ḭš-kṵ́šḭ Juan
3PO-corn Juan
‘Juan’s corn’

The person of the possessor is indicated by a prefix and the number of the possessor by a suffix, as shown by the follow paradigm from Upper Necaxa:

Upper Necaxa Totonac
singular	plural
kin–kṵ́šḭ 'my corn'	kin–kṵ́šḭ–ka̰n 'our corn'
min–kṵ́šḭ 'your.SG corn'	min–kṵ́šḭ–ka̰n 'your.PL corn'
ḭš–kṵ́šḭ 'his/her corn'	ḭš–kṵ́šḭ–ka̰n 'their corn'

In several of the languages, kinship terms and words referring to parts of the body and objects are inherently possessed—that is, they are obligatorily marked for a possessor. When an inherently possessed noun is used in a generic expression, a special indefinite possessor prefix (ša- in most of the languages that have it) is used—e.g. Upper Necaxa šapúškṵ 'an elder brother/elders brothers in general'.

=== Numerals ===
Numerals in Totonacan languages are bound roots that require a classificatory prefix which changes based on the type, shape or measure of object being counted. This is illustrated for one of the languages Upper Necaxa Totonac in the table below:

maktin čoʍ ‘one tortilla’	pḛʔtin pa̰ʔɬma̰ ‘one leaf’	ʔentin kḭwḭ ‘one stick’	paːtin ɬa̰mam ‘one pot’	puːlaktin sḛ́ːʔna̰ ‘one banana tree’	mustin sḛ́ːʔna' ‘one full bunch of bananas’	kilhmaktin sḛ́ːʔna̰ ‘one small bunch of bananas’	heːtin sḛ́ːʔna̰ ‘one banana’
maktṵ́ čoʍ ‘two tortillas’	pḛʔtṵ pa̰ʔɬma̰ ‘two leaves’	ʔentṵ kḭwḭ ‘two sticks’	paːtṵ ɬa̰mam ‘two pots’	puːlaktuː sḛ́ːʔna̰ ‘two banana trees’	mustṵ sḛ́ːʔna' ‘two full bunches of bananas’	kilhmaktṵ sḛ́ːʔna̰ ‘two small bunches of bananas’	heːtṵ sḛ́ːʔna̰ ‘two bananas’
maktṵtun čoʍ ‘three tortillas’	pḛʔtṵtun pa̰ʔɬma̰ ‘three leaves’	ʔentṵtun kḭwḭ ‘three sticks’	paːtṵtun ɬa̰mam ‘three pots’	puːlaktṵtun sḛ́ːʔna̰ ‘three banana trees’	mustṵtun sḛ́ːʔna' ‘three full bunches of bananas’	kilhmaktṵtun sḛ́ːʔna̰ ‘three small bunches of bananas’	heːtṵtun sḛ́ːʔna̰ ‘four bananas’
makta̰ːtḭ čoʍ ‘four tortillas’	pḛʔta̰ːtḭ pa̰ʔɬma̰ ‘four leaves’	ʔenta̰ːtḭ kḭwḭ ‘four sticks’	paːta̰ːtḭ ɬa̰mam ‘four pots’	puːtṵtun sḛ́ːʔna̰ ‘four banana trees’	mustṵtun sḛ́ːʔna' ‘four full bunches of bananas’	kilhmaktṵtun sḛ́ːʔna̰ ‘four small bunches of bananas’	heːtṵtun sḛ́ːʔna̰ ‘four bananas’

In total, Upper Necaxa has around 30 classificatory prefixes.

The following table compares the numeral bases of six Totonacan languages.

	Tepehua			Totonac		
	Huehuetla	Pisaflores	Tlachichilco	Upper Necaxa	Papantla	Misantla
1	-tam	-tam	-tawm	-tin	-tum	-tun
2	-t’ui	-t’ui	-t’ui	-tṵ	-tṵy	-tṵʔ
3	-t’utu	-t’utu	-t’útu	-tṵtún	-tṵ́:tu	-atún
4	-t’at’ɪ	-t’aːt’i	-t’áːt’i	-táːtḭ	-táːtḭ	-ta̰ːt
5	-kis	-kiːs	-kiːs	-kitsís	-kitsís	-kítsis
6	-čašan	-čášan	-čášan	-čašán	-čašán	-čaːšán
7	-tuhun	-tuhún	-tuhún	-toxón	-tuxún	-tuhún
8	-ts’ahin	-tsahín	-tsahín	-tsayán	-tsayán	-tsiyán
9	-nahats	-naháːtsi	-naháːtsi	-naxáːtsa	-naxáːtsa	-naháːtsa
10	-kau	-kaw	-kaw	-kaux	-kaw	-kaːwi

=== Sound symbolism ===
A prominent feature of Totonacan languages is the presence of sound symbolism. The most common (but by no means only) sound-symbolic pattern in Totonacan involves fricative alterations, typically /s/ ~ /š/ ~ /ɬ/ and occasionally /ts/ ~ /č/ ~ /š/ correlated either with increasingly more energetic or forceful action or with the size of an event participant, as in the following examples from Upper Necaxa Totonac:

laŋs ‘hand striking hard’ laŋš ‘blow striking with force’ laŋɬ ‘blow striking with great force’	spipispipi ‘small person or animal trembling’ špipišpipi ‘person or animal shivering or shaking slightly’ ɬpipiɬpipi ‘person or animal shaking or having convulsions’

Comparative as well as language-internal evidence suggests that the pattern of consonantal alternations may have their origins in affixes indicating grade—s- ‘diminutive‘, š- ‘medium’, ɬ- ‘augmentative’). In general, the productivity of the sound-symbolic alternations is highly variable within and across languages of the family, and many languages preserve for a given stem only one of a set of two or three alternates that can be reconstructed for proto-Totonacan.

== Totonacan vocabulary ==
The following selection of Proto-Totonacan reconstructions and descendants is taken from MacKay and Trechsel (2018), using data from several other studies. The reconstructions and descendants are written in Americanist notation.

		Totonac								Tepehua		
Proto-Totonacan		Misantla	Apapantilla	Upper Necaxa	Filomeno Mata	Highland			Papantla	Pisaflores	Huehuetla	Tlachichilco
reconstruction	gloss	Misantla	Apapantilla	Upper Necaxa	Filomeno Mata	Zapotitlán	Coatepec	Ozelonacaxtla	Papantla	Pisaflores	Huehuetla	Tlachichilco
*ɬk’ak’a	'ash(es)'	ɬká̰k	ɬka̰ka̰n	ɬka̰kán	ɬká̰ka̰	ɬka̰ka̰	ɬkakáʔ	ɬká̰ka̰	ɬká̰ka̰	ɬk’ák’a	ɬk’ak’a	ɬk’ák’a
*ƛaha-ya	'wins; earns'	ɬáahá	ƛahá	ɬaxá	ƛahá	ƛahay	ƛaha-	ƛaháy	ƛahá	ɬaháay	ɬaháy	ɬaháay
*q’aaši	'gourd'	qá̰a̰š	qa̰a̰š	ʔa̰a̰š	qá̰a̰ši	qa̰a̰šḭ	qa:šíʔ	qá̰a̰šḭ	qá̰a̰šḭ	ʔá̰a̰ši	ʔaaš	ʔaš
*¢’uq’-ya	'writes'	¢ɔ̰́χ	¢o̰qa	¢ó̰ʔa	¢ɔ́qḁ	¢o̰qa	¢uqa	¢ɔ̰qnán	¢ó̰qa	¢’ɔ́ʔa	¢’oqa	¢’oʔa
*p’ašni	'pig'	pá̰šnḭ	pa̰šnḭ	pá̰šnḭ	pá̰šn̥i̥	pa̰šnḭ	pašniʔ	pá̰šnḭ	pa̰šni	ɓá̰šn̥i̥	p’aš	p’ašni
*kiɬni	'mouth'	kíɬnḭ	kiɬnḭ	kíɬnḭ	kíɬni̥̰	kiɬnḭ	kiɬniʔ	kíɬnḭ	kiɬni	kíɬn̥i̥	kiɬ	kiɬna
*čiwiš	'stone'	čɪ́wɪš	čiwiš	čiwíš	číwiš	číwiš	čɪ́wiš	číwiš	číwiš	číʔṵši̥	čiiuš	číyuš
*maa-ɬi	'is lying down'	má̰a̰ɬ	ma̰a̰	maaɬ	máa̰h	ma̰h	má	máh	má	máaɬ	maaɬ	maa

== Media ==
Totonacan-language programming is carried by the CDI's radio station XECTZ-AM, broadcasting from Cuetzalan, Puebla.

Manuscript about the language dated 1891

== Bibliography ==
- Aikhenvald, Alexandra Y. (2003). Classifiers: A typology of noun categorization devices. Oxford: Oxford University Press. ISBN 978-0-19-926466-7.
- Andersen, G. P. (2012). "Totonaco del Cerro Xinolatéṕetl". In Levy, Paulette; Beck, David (eds.). Las lenguas totonacas y tepehuas: Textos y otros materiales para sus estudios (in Spanish). México, D.F.: Universidad Nacional Autónoma de México. pp. 181–193.
- Anonymous (1990), Norman McQuown (ed.), Arte Totonaca, México, D.F.: México, D.F. (Facsimile). (in Spanish)
- Arana Osnaya, Evangelina (1953). "Reconstruccion del protototonaco". Revista Mexicana de estudios Antropologicos (in Spanish). 13 (2, 3): 1–10.
- Aschmann, H.P. (1946). "Totonaco phonemes". International Journal of American Linguistics. 12 (1): 34–43. doi:10.1086/463885. S2CID 224808130.
- Beck, David (2004). Upper Necaxa Totonac. Languages of the World/Materials 429. Munich: Lincom. ISBN 3-89586-821-3.
- Beck, David (2008). "Ideophones, adverbs, and predicate qualification in Upper Necaxa Totonac". International Journal of American Linguistics. 74 (1): 1–46. doi:10.1086/529462. S2CID 143943030.
- Beck, David (2011). Upper Necaxa Totonac Dictionary. Berlin: Mouton de Gruyter. doi:10.1515/9783110238235. ISBN 978-3-11-023822-8.
- Beck, David (2012). "Totonaco de Río Necaxa". In Levy, Paulette; Beck, David (eds.). Las lenguas totonacas y tepehuas: Textos y otros materiales para sus estudios (in Spanish). México, D.F.: Universidad Nacional Autónoma de México. pp. 195–267.
- Bishop, Ruth G. (1984). "Consonant play in lexical sets in Northern Totonac". Summer Institute of Linguistics Mexico Workpapers. 5: 24–31.
- Brown, Cecil H.; Beck, David; Kondrak, Grzegorz; Watters, James K.; Wichmann, Søren (2011). "Totozoquean". International Journal of American Linguistics. 77 (3): 323–372. doi:10.1086/660972. S2CID 224807468.
- Chan, Eugene. "Totonacan Numerals". Archived from the original on 2011-05-11.
- Davletshin, Albert (2008). Classification of the Totonacan languages. Paper read at the conference “Problemy izuchenija dal’nego rodstva jazykov (k 55 -leti C. A. Starostina),”. Russian State University for the Humanities, Moscow, March 25–28, 2008.
- de Léon, Lourdes; Levinson, Stephen C. (1992). "Spatial Description in Mesoamerican Languages (Introduction)". Zeitschrift für Phonetik, Sprachwissenschaft und Kommunikationsforschung. 45 (6): 527–29.
- García Rojas, Blanca (1978). Dialectología de la zona totonaco-tepehua (Master’s Thesis) (in Spanish). México D. F.: Escuela Nacional de Antropología e Historia.
- Ichon, Alain (1969). La religión de los totonacos de la sierra (in Spanish). México, D.F.: Instituto Nacional Indigenísta.
- INALI (14 January 2008). "Catálogo de las lenguas indígenas nacionales: Variantes lingüísticas de México con sus autodenominaciones y referencias geoestadísticas" (PDF online facsimile). Diario Oficial de la Federación (in Spanish). 652 (9). México, D.F.: Imprenta del Gobierno Federal, SEGOB. OCLC 46461036.
- Lam, Yvonne (2009). "The straw that broke the language's back: Language shift in the Upper Necaxa Valley of Mexico". International Journal of the Sociology of Language (195): 219–233. doi:10.1515/ijsl.2009.012. S2CID 144076249.
- Levy, Paulette (1987). Fonologia del Totonaco de Papantla (in Spanish). México, D.F.: Universidad Nacional Autónoma de México.
- Levy, Paulette (1990). Totonaco de Papantla, Veracruz (in Spanish). México, D.F.: El Colegio de México.
- Levy, Paulette (1992). "Body Part Prefixes in Papantla Totonac". In de Lourdes, Léon; Levinson, Stephen C. (eds.). Spatial Description in Mesoamerican Languages. pp. 530–542.
- Levy, Paulette (1999). "From "part" to "shape": Incorporation in Totonac and the issue of classification by verbs". International Journal of American Linguistics. 65 (2): 127–175. doi:10.1086/466380. S2CID 144277772.
- Levy, Paulette (2012). "Totonaco de Papantla: El Cerro del Carbón". In Paulette Levy & David Beck (ed.). Las lenguas totonacas y tepehuas: Textos y otros materiales para sus estudios (in Spanish). Mexico City: Universidad Nacional Autónoma de México. pp. 345–466.
- Levy, Paulette; Beck, David, eds. (2012). Las lenguas totonacas y tepehuas: Textos y otros materiales para sus estudios (in Spanish). México, D.F.: Universidad Nacional Autónoma de México.
- MacKay, Carolyn (1999). A Grammar of Misantla Totonac. Salt Lake City: University of Utah Press. ISBN 0-87480-455-8.
- MacKay, Carolyn; Trechsel, Frank R. (2012a). "Tepehua de Pisaflores, Veracruz". In Paulette Levy & David Beck (ed.). Las lenguas totonacas y tepehuas: Textos y otros materiales para sus estudios (in Spanish). México, D.F.: Universidad Nacional Autónoma de México. pp. 107–118.
- MacKay, Carolyn; Trechsel, Frank R. (2012b). "Totonaco de Misantla, Veracruz". In Paulette Levy & David Beck (ed.). Las lenguas totonacas y tepehuas: Textos y otros materiales para sus estudios (in Spanish). México, D.F.: Universidad Nacional Autónoma de México. pp. 119–179.
- MacKay, C. J.; Trechsel, F. R. (2015). "Totonac-Tepehua genetic relationships". Amerindia. 37 (2): 121–158.
- McFarland, Teresa (2012). "Totonaco de Filomeno Mata". In Paulette Levy & David Beck (ed.). Las lenguas totonacas y tepehuas: Textos y otros materiales para sus estudios (in Spanish). México, D.F.: Universidad Nacional Autónoma de México. pp. 269–291.
- McQuown, Norman (1990) [1940]. Gramatica de la lengua totonaca (Coatepec, Sierra Norte de Puebla). México, D.F.: Universidad Nacional Autónoma de México.
- Mithun, Marianne (1984). "The Evolution of Noun Incorporation". Language. 60 (4): 847–94. doi:10.2307/413800. JSTOR 413800.
- Nichols, Johanna (1986). "Head-marking and dependent-marking grammar". Language. 6 (2): 56–119. doi:10.1353/lan.1986.0014. S2CID 144574879.
- Reid, A.A.; Bishop, Ruth G. (1974). Diccionario de Totonaco de Xicotepec de Juarez, Puebla (in Spanish). Mexico D.F.: Instituto Lingüístico de Verano (ILV).
- Roman Lobato, Gabriela (2012). "Totonaco de San JUan Ozelonacaxtla, Puebla". In Paulette Levy & David Beck (ed.). Las lenguas totonacas y tepehuas: Textos y otros materiales para sus estudios (in Spanish). México, D.F.: Universidad Nacional Autónoma de México. pp. 321–344.
- Smythe Kung, Susan (2006). "Simbolismo sonoro y lenguaje expresivo en el tepehua de Huehuetla [Sound symbolism and expressive language in Huehuetla Tepehua]". In Morúa, María del Carmen (ed.). Memorias del VIII Encuentro Internacional de Lingüística en el Noroeste, tomo 3 (in Spanish). Hermosillo: Editorial UniSon. pp. 331–354.
- Smythe Kung, Susan (2012). "Tepehua de Huehuetla". In Paulette Levy & David Beck (ed.). Las lenguas totonacas y tepehuas: Textos y otros materiales para sus estudios (in Spanish). México, D.F.: Universidad Nacional Autónoma de México. pp. 65–106.
- Tino, Jorge (2012). "Totonaco de Olintla". In Paulette Levy & David Beck (ed.). Las lenguas totonacas y tepehuas: Textos y otros materiales para sus estudios (in Spanish). México, D.F.: Universidad Nacional Autónoma de México. pp. 293–319.
- Watters, James K. (2012). "Tepehua de Tlachichilco". In Paulette Levy & David Beck (ed.). Las lenguas totonacas y tepehuas: Textos y otros materiales para sus estudios (in Spanish). México, D.F.: Universidad Nacional Autónoma de México. pp. 43–64.
