= Totonac languages =

Totonacan language cluster of eastern Mexico

Totonac
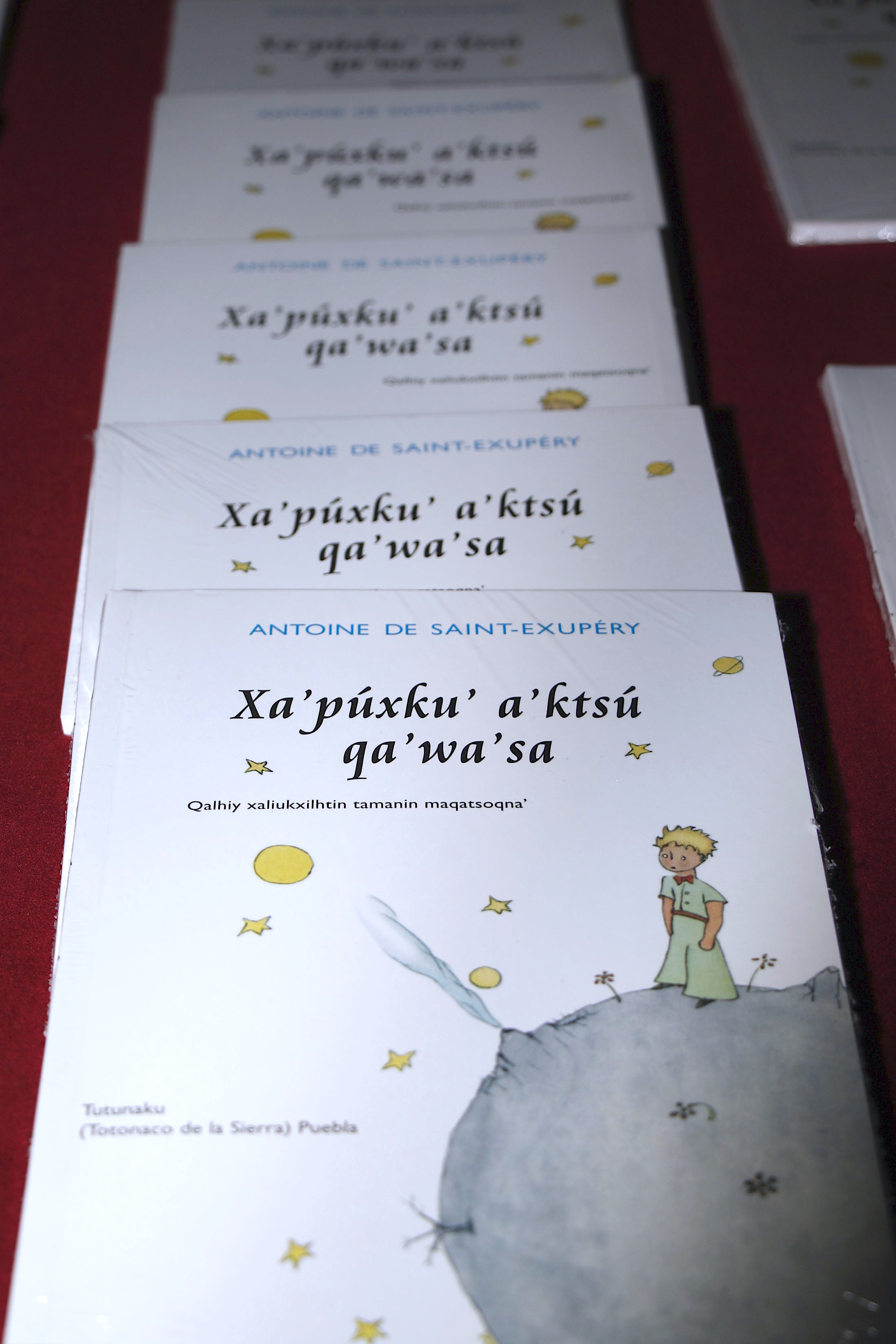
- Copies of The Little Prince in Totonac
- Native to: Mexico
- Region: Puebla, Veracruz, Zacatlán
- Ethnicity: Totonac
- Native speakers: 260,000 (2020 census)
- Language family: Totonacan: Totonac

Official status
- Regulated by: INALI

Language codes
- ISO 639-3: Variously: toc – Coyutla Totonac tlp – Filomena Mata-Coahuitlán Totonac tos – Highland Totonac top – Papantla Totonac tcw – Tecpatlán Totonac tku – Upper Necaxa Totonac tqt – Ozumatlán Totonac too – Xicotepec de Juárez Totonac tlc – Yecuatla Totonac
- Glottolog: toto1252
- ELP: Totonac
- Map of various Totonac languages showing their classification

- People: Totonac
- Language: Totonac
- Country: Totonacapan

Totonac is a Totonacan language cluster of Mexico, spoken across a number of central Mexican states by the Totonac people. It is a Mesoamerican language and shows many of the traits which define the Mesoamerican Linguistic Area. Along with some 62 other indigenous languages, it is recognised as an official language of Mexico, though as a single language.

== History ==
The Totonac people are an indigenous group native to Totonacapan along the Gulf of Mexico. The Gulf of Mexico stretches from the Texan border to the Yucatán Peninsula. It includes the greatest topographic diversity in the country and contains a great variety of ecozones as well as microhabitats. The Totonac people share their territory with the Nahua, Otomí, and Tepehua (not to be confused with the Tepehuano language), all of which have communities within the region. Totonacapan is located in east central Mexico between present day Puebla and Veracruz. The people of Totonac have migrated to various cities such as Veracruz, Puebla, and Mexico City. Totonac populations are also found in colonized regions of Uxpanapa in southern Veracruz and the state of Quintana Roo in the eastern part of the Yucatán Peninsula. The Totonac inhabit two different types of environments: cool and rainy mesas of high altitude and warm and humid coastal lowlands.

=== Name ===
There are some sources that claim that the term Totonac, as explained by residents, means "people that come from where the sun rises." Other explanations of the term consist of derogatory meanings that indicate little capacity or ability to understand. However, there are other interpretations of the term which state that Totonac consist of the explanation that toto translates to "three" while naco translates to "corazón" for the overall meaning of totonaco becoming "three hearts".

== Classification ==
The most recent proposal for the classification of the Totonac languages separates Misantla from a core Central group, and further divides that group into Northern and Lowland–Sierra families.

Misantla
Central

Northern

Upper Necaxa
Tecpatlán
Zihuateutla
Cerro Xinolatépetl
Apapantilla

Lowland–Sierra

Filomeno Mata
Lowland
Sierra

Coatepec †
Coyutla
Huehuetla
Ozelonacaxtla
Olintla
Zapotitlán de Méndez

== Phonology ==
The following is the Totonac phonology from Huehuetla, Sierra Norte de Puebla.

=== Consonants ===
	Bilabial	Alveolar	Palatal	Lateral	Velar	Uvular	Glottal
Stop	p	t			k	q	ʔ
Affricate		ts	tʃ	tɬ			
Fricative		s	ʃ	ɬ			h
Sonorant	m	n	j	l	w		

=== Distribution of the phonemes ===
/p/ bilabial stop

Two allophones:

[p] voiceless bilabial stop

[b] voiced bilabial stop, in free variation after a nasal consonant

/t/ alveolar stop

Two allophones:

[t] voiceless alveolar stop

[d] voiced alveolar stop, in free variation after a nasal consonant

/k/ velar stop

Two allophones:

[k] voiceless velar stop

[ɡ] voiced velar stop, in free variation after a nasal consonant

/q/ stop uvular

Three allophones:

[q] voiceless uvular stop

[ɢ] voiced uvular stop, in free variation after a nasal consonant

[χ] voiceless uvular fricative, in free variation after a fricative and in final position after the vowel /i/

/ʔ/ glottal stop

This phoneme appears only in final position after a vowel and tends to disappear in speech.

/l/ lateral sonorant

[l] lateral alveolar sonorant

[ɾ] alveolar flap, in free variation before /a/

/n/ alveolar nasal

Three allophones:

[n] alveolar nasal

[ŋ] velar nasal, occurs before a velar stop

[ɴ] uvular nasal, occurs before a uvular stop

/j/ voiced palatal sonorant

[j] voiced palatal sonorant

[j̊] voiceless palatal sonorant, in free variation in syllable-final position

/w/ voiced labiovelar sonorant

[w] voiced labiovelar sonorant

[w̥] voiceless labiovelar sonorant, in free variation in syllable-final position

==== Observation ====
The phoneme /ʔ/ presents a widely observed frequency within the Totonac languages spoken in the areas of Papantla and Xicotepec de Juarez (Ashmann, 1973 y Reid & Bishop, 1974). Crescencio García Ramos, in his work about the phonology of the Totonac of El Tajin, notes the mechanical character of the glottal closure and at the same time he points at the “operative importance” in certain positions (García Ramos, 1979: 153). He also presents a series of occlusive glottalized consonants:

/pʔ/, /tʔ/, /kʔ/, /qʔ/, /tsʔ/, /tʃʔ/, /tɬʔ/.

In the variant that is studied here, there is an observed tendency to the disappearance of the phoneme /ʔ/; this notion is also mentioned by McQuown in the Coatepec dialect: “the phoneme /ʔ/ disappears under various circumstances” (McQuown, 1990: 85–86).

=== Vowels ===
	Front		Central		Back	
	short	long	short	long	short	long
High	i	iː			u	uː
Low			a	aː		

/i/ front, high, closed, unrounded

Five allophones:

[i], [ĩ], [ɛ], [ɛ̃], [i̥]

/iː/ front, high, closed, unrounded, long

Three allophones:

[iː], [ɛː], [iɛ]

/a/ central, low, open, unrounded

Three allophones:

[a], [ã], [ḁ]

/aː/ central, low, open, unrounded, long

Two allophones:

[aː], [ãː]

/u/ back, high, closed, rounded

Five allophones:

[u], [ũ], [ɔ], [ɔ̃], [u̥]

/uː/ back, high, closed, rounded, long

Two allophones:

[uː], [ũː]

== Morphology in Filomeno Mata Totonac ==
Morphology in Filomeno Mata Totonac includes inflection, derivation, and compounding. Adjectives in this language have reduplication, which can also be seen throughout the use of this language. Speakers prefer to use verbal expressions more generally throughout their everyday way of speaking such as using words like "'instead of ‘visitors’, tiintamimáana ‘those who are coming’; instead of ‘seamstresses’, tiintsapananáh ‘those who sew’."Filomeno Mata Totonac is a verb-centric language and includes non-verbal elements as well. Filomeno Mata Totonac marks subject and object on the verb. Nouns in this language have a variety of structures of morphology. Regarding pronouns, there are no gender distinctions within this language. "Only one set of personal pronouns exists which may be used for subjects or objects." The speakers of this language switch between the first person pronoun using either i-, a-, or e-. There is a contradiction between the language speakers of this language regarding the third person pronouns either using 'uu' or 'tsamá' because it can be used in different ways in a sentence.

=== Independent pronouns ===
	Singular	Plural
1st person	’íkitị, ’ákitị, ’ékitị	’ikinán, ’akinán, ’ekinán
2nd person	wiš	wisinán
3rd person	’u’ụ, tsamá	tsamá (?)

=== Examples showing personal pronouns ===
FM Totonac	Translation into English
’íkiti k’an kaatuwán	‘I go to the ranch’
’íkiti n kiláaqtsi	‘it was I that he saw’
taaskúha wiš	‘you work’
tsamá lukunán	‘he fights (habitually)’
‘akinán i ktsukuniitáw	'we have begun’
wišinán qootnunáa	‘you pl. drink’
tsamá tatamóqosłị	'they fell'

=== Possession in Filomeno Mata Totonac ===
Regarding possession in Filomeno Mata Totonac, nouns can be inflected for possession but adjectives cannot be. With Kinship terms it always uses possessive markers. It is stated that, "Body part nouns and nouns referring to items of clothing are also almost always possessed." The possessive prefixes are kin- for first person, min- for second person, and š- for third person. kan- is used when it is suffixed to the noun and this happens when a plural possessor is involved. This can be shown in the following table:

Possessive Paradigm: túmin='money'
Singular	Translation	Plural	Translation
kin-túmin	'my money'	kin-tumin-kán	'our money'
min-túmin	'your money'	min-tumin-kán ‘	'your money'
š-túmin	he/she/its money'	š-tumin-kán	'their money'

It is common in this language that possessive affixation does not affect stress except in the noun 'house' which is ĉikị in Filomeno Mata Totonac. What happens with this particular word is that it the stress will shift into the prefix if it is 1st or 2nd person singular or take the plural suffix which will always carry the stress and it will look like "kinĉikkán ‘our house’, or minĉikkán for ‘your house’. "When the noun referring to the possessor appears with the possessed noun, the order is POSSESSED-POSSESSOR, with the first noun affixed with possessive marker(s)." This is consistent with the word order being VSO but can change to rule out adjective-noun word order in this case. When plural nouns are possessed, the possessive affixes occur outside of the plural morphemes. This is shown in the following table to give examples of this being portrayed.

Pluralization and Possession
ki-na-piipí-n’ị 1.POSS-PL-older.sister-PL 'my older sisters'	ki-na-kuku-nii-n-kán 1.POSS-PL-uncle-PL-E-PL.POSS 'our uncles'	mi-na-taaláa-n 2.POSS-PL-sibling-PL 'your siblings'

==== Clitics in Filomeno Mata Totonac ====
Clitics are a bound morphemes that also have syntactic characteristics. They are used in different categories of negation/negative polarity items, aspectual adverbials and other adverbials as well. The aspectual enclitics include =ts’ḁ meaning ‘already’ and =kú’ụ meaning 'just;still’. Proclitics and enclitics attach to word classes in this language. For negative intensifiers, tuu=, tii=, łaa= and čii= can attach to nouns, pronouns, adjectives, adverbs and numbers. There are other clitics that are proclitics such as maya meaning 'nothing but' and laa meaning 'like' that attach only to nouns. Some examples of proclitics and how they are used are given in the following table.

Proclitics

maya=lakpuskáan
‘nothing but women’

maya=séqetị
'nothing but grass'

láa=n-kin-taalá’ḁ
like=E-1.POSS-sibling
‘(he’s) like a brother to me’

láa=m-pášni waayán
like=E-pig eat
's/he eats like a pig'

===== Numerical system in Filomeno Mata Totonac =====
Filomeno Mata Totonac has a very interesting way of describing numbers and writing them out. It states that "the number roots from 11–19 are composed roughly of a ‘ten’ prefix and the numerals from 1–9. The numerals up to twenty prefixed by the general numeral classifier ’aq-, also used for spherical objects." The table below will only show the numbers from 1–20.

Filomeno Mata Totonac Numbers
1	’aq-tím	11	’aq-kawítụ
2	’aq-tó'	12	’aq-kutó’
3	’aq-tutụ	13	’aq-kutútụ
4	’aq-tatị	14	’aq-kutátị
5	’aq-kítsis	15	’aq-kukítsis
6	’aq-čašán	16	’aq-kučašán
7	’aq-tuxún	17	’aq-kutuxún
8	’aq-tsayán	18	’aq-kutsayán
9	aq-naxátsḁ	19	’aq-kunaxátsḁ
10	aq-káw	20	’aq-pušám

====== Derivational morphology in Filomeno Mata Totonac ======
The non-verbal derivation that is used in Filomeno Totonac contains around "1500 nouns, adjectives and adverbs." Most of the words are derived from verbs. Almost all non-verbal elements is achieved in verbs, both prefixation and suffixation. Reduplication is an exception to this in certain subsets. The derivational verbal morphology has a huge variety of verbal morphemes. It has "valence-changing affixes; negation and negative polarity items; distributive, desiderative, iterative, ambulative, totalitive and deictic affixes; and other more idiosyncratic ones". Because Filomeno Mata Totonac is a language that has not been written down until recently, speakers differ on how to construct written words. Most of the derivational affixes occur only once on a verb however because of recursion, it can occur more than once. Examples of these morphemes are "–nii, causative maa-, and the instrumental applicatives lii- and puu-." Derivation is achieves through affixation. Relating to inflectional affixes, derivational affixes happen when it is both preceding and following the verb stem. An example of a derivational morpheme is as follows the associative prefix maq- which indicates the action of a verb that is performed with others.The associative does not affect the valence of the verb. The verb maqtayaa (ASS.+stand) will then be translated into 'help someone'.

kmaqwaayanqóow /k-maq-waayan-qóo-wḁ/ 1.EXCL-ASS-eat-TOT-1PL 'we finished eating together'	naamaqtanúuma /naa=maq-ta-nuu-maa/ also=ASS-ing-in-PROG 'he is also among them'	kkiitammaqskuxłị /k-kii-ta-maq-skux-łị/ 1.EXCL-RT-ing-ASS-work-PFV 'I went with him to work with others'

== Upper Necaxa Totonac syntax ==
Upper Necaxa Totonac (UNT) is an indigenous language from the area of Puebla, Mexico.

=== Simple sentences ===
UNT sentences are elastic and there is every combination of word order.

The only exception to that rule is the sentence which has predicate initial structure where the verb is followed by the NP, as shown in the following example:

"tsisáx tʃu: wá mat taʃtutsá tsamá: táʔo (Ch.) now early in the morning the old woman came by"

There is no firm order for SO or OS but when there are two NPs (noun phrases) people commonly use VSO order. A sentence such as “túksli Pedro Juan” is more likely to be understood as “Pedro hit Juan,” and less likely to be taken as “Juan hit Pedro.” Verbs normally appear at the beginning of the sentence but a focused subject may appear at the beginning followed by a verb as in the following sentences:

"tsamá: is’áta animá:ɬ xa: tu: skatkutún

the animal's child doesn't want to learn anything"

tu: tsamá: ka:li: tampá: tawanán

those (animals) that you are bringing eat people"

The previous examples are often encountered in narratives and discourse and may set the topic. In the sentence “Those animals you were bringing eat people.” I'm talking about those animals that you are bringing. When I want to tell you exactly what I'm talking about I give the topic first, which is the “those animals.” The use of personal pronouns is rare but usually found at the beginning of the sentence in discourse:

"kit nu:n ti: kintama:wa: ní kilúʃu me, no one has bought me my clothes"

We may also note that in interrogative sentences the question word is at the beginning of the sentence. It appears that UNT is more concerned with giving you the most pertinent information first and not worried so much about having a rigid sentence order. More research needs to be done but this is how the language appears to work.

==== Copular clause ====
A copular predicate is necessary for use with nominal and adjectival predicates. The predicate connects noun and adjective and a nominal predicate compliments both. When using present tense the copula is zero, past and future tenses have their distinct copula. We can see how this works in the following sentences:

"kit ma:ʔeɬtawaʔae:ní

I am a teacher

"kit ma:ʔeɬtawaʔae:ní ʃakwaní:

I was a teacher

"kit ma:ʔeɬtawaʔae:ní nakwán

I will be a teacher"

In the following example we can see how the verb “wan” (meaning “be”) is what the copula is based on. Through the morphological derivation the copula joins with the desiderative suffix “-kutun” giving us the meaning of “wanting to X,” as seen below:

"tsamá: ʔawátʔa púʃku wankutún the boy wants to be a chief (someday)"

Predicate nominals follow a word order with the subject at the beginning and verb at the end so that the copula is between them. Adjectival predicates follow the same style, as in the following:

"lú:kux tʃiʃkú

the man is brave

lú:kux ʃwaní tʃiʃkú

the man was brave

lú:kux nawán tʃiʃkú

the man will be brave"

When a copular sentence contains adjectival predicates and pronominal subjects the subject will be at the beginning of the sentence: Other than the perfect aspects, other copular aspects may be constructed as in the following:

"tá:tʃa, waní: wiʃ ʔaɬa:wanampá: aha! so it's you whose stealing and eating"

==== Negation ====
UNT negation employs the negative particle “xa” before the verb in a sentence:

"xa: wáɬ tsamá: tʃáux, xa: waɬ

he didn't eat the tortillas, he didn't eat them

pus, xa:k manóʔɬa tu: ya: animá:ɬ wamá:ɬ tsamá: sandía

well, I can't find out what kind of animal is eating the watermelon"

Basically other than inserting “xa” before the verb to form the negative there is no other morphological changes in the sentence. Moreover, “xa” can be combined with animate and inanimate pronouns in order to achieve the equivalents of the words “no one” and “nothing” in English, as seen here:

"xa:tsá ti: iʃlaʔtsinkutún tsamá: paléx now no one wanted to see the priest"

The particle “le” is also used in combination with “xa” to express inability, as in the following example:

"xa: le: katimaʔeɬtawaʔé:ɬ (Ch.) he was not able to teach them"

==== Questions ====
Interrogative pronouns in UNT are used to ask questions, are focused, and appear at the beginning of a sentence to ask “Who? What? How? Where? When?”:

"ti: wan?

who is it?

tu: ɬawawí:la wa:tsá?

what are you sitting here doing?

tʃi: naɬawayá:uw

what are we going to do?

xa: laktantít?

where did you come (through)?

xákʃni wánti?

when did you say it?"

Because of the locative interrogative relative pronoun “xa” sound alike, most questions asking about location use the particle “tʃu” in order to avoid misinterpretation:

"xa: tʃu: pína? where are you going?"

In order to ask the equivalent of English questions such as “which” and “what kind,” we can add the particle “ya” to “ti” (who) and “tu” as demonstrated in the following questions:

"ti: ya: kɾistiánu ya:ɬ naktéx?

who is standing in the road? (lit. 'which person...')

tu: ya: ma:pá:tʃa?

what kind of walls (does it have?)"

Asking “yes/no” questions in UNT is the same as when you are making a statement with the exception of the rising intonation at the end of the sentence indicating the need for a yes/no response:

=== Complex sentences ===
==== Coordination ====
In UNT the common coordinating conjunctions are “ʔe” (and) and “ʔo” (or) and are suspected to have been borrowed from the Spanish “y” and “o” and are used in much the same way as their Spanish and English counterparts, as seen here:

"tsamá: puská:t laʔatʃu:yá:ɬ tsí:sa naka:takúʃtu ʔe: xikwánli

the woman had a vision in the wee hours in the bush and was afraid

antsá iʃtawi:laná:ɬ tsamá: tʃa:tú: tsamá ʔawátʃa ʔe tsumaxát

the two of them lived there, a boy and a girl."

No evidence of coordination of other kinds of words or phrases has been found to date, but there are the conjunctions “ʔo” (or) and “pal” (if) are equal to “either...or”:

"ʔo: paɬ tala:li:ma:kiɬwakáɬ ʔo: paɬ tala:li:lakaɬtukúɬ either they smashed each other in the mouth or they stabbed each other in the face"

UNT also employs the adverb "na," roughly equivalent to the English "both" and "also."

"natʃipá na: iʃmakan na: iʃtuxanín it is going to grab both his hands and also his feet"

These two coordinating conjunctions are rare.

==== Subordination ====
UNT has a uniform pattern for building finite subordinate clauses. First, we have a relative pronoun or complementizer which is followed by an ordinary finite verb.

==== Relative clauses ====
Relative clauses are formed around a verb preceded by “ti” or “tu.” “Ti” is used for humans, supernatural beings and certain animals after the noun being modified.

"kmaʔní:ɬ kit misín ti: iʃmín ka:wá lakstín

I killed the nagual that was coming to eat the children

kalaʔáuw tsamá: táʔo ti: ʃtaʔanán

let's go to that old woman who makes tortillas

ʔeɬatu:tún ʃtawi:laná:ɬ ti: xa: iʃtaapaʃní:

there were three that hadn't had baptism"

Similarly to how we used it with questions, we add the particle “ya” to distinguish between “what” and “which one.” Inanimates and animals considered of low status take the form “tu” rather than “ti.”

"mat min lú:wa tu: mat iʃmín ka:wá kɾistiánu they say that a snake would come and eat people"

==== Complement clauses ====
Semantically, we can sort these clauses into two groups, the first type being the one referred to as a “headless relative clause,” that is referred to in arguing the embedded clause. The other is “sentential complement clause” that refer to an event or state of affairs. Here are some examples of “headless relatives.”

"katasaníuwtsamá: ti: nakinka:maʔta:yayá:n let's call the one who is going to help us"

It's interesting to note the expression some older people use to refer to one's wife, “ti ma wí” which literally translates to “the one that feeds him” in English.

ʔe nali:pína tsamá: ti: kima:wí: and you will take my wife"

Although they sometimes occur, headless relatives with the pronoun “tu” are less common.

"iʃmín tu: iʃwamá:ɬ that thing that was eating it came"

Another type of complement clause is the non-argument that is formed with other relative pronouns as seen in the following:

"tasta:lá: tsamá: uʃúm, xa:tsá katsí: tʃi: tsex natamaʔta:yá the wasps follow him, he doesn't know how he will save himself"

With the exception of the relative pronoun, ordinary matrix and embedded clauses are the same. Sentential clauses are usually formed by using the conjunction “paɬ” (if).

"wiʃ katsí:ya paɬ tsex nata:taʃtúya you know whether you can come out ahead with him"

==== Adverbial clauses ====
These are subordinate clauses that are used to express time, location, manner, motive, purpose, condition and are preceded by one of two complementizers used to build clauses that are time-related. These are “akʃní” ‘when’ and “li waná”(Pt.)/“li wán” (Ch.), ‘while.’ The former is the more commonly used and the latter rarely.

"ikte:aktʃintama:pí:ɬ akʃní te:taʃtúɬ tsamá: tumí:n

I stepped on the money and flattened it when I passet by

li:waná: naxáʃa nakɬawá tu: nawáya (Pt.)

while you rest, I'll make your food

li:wán nakpáʃa, li:wán naɬáwa líwa (Ch.)

while I bathe, you make the food"

An adverbial clause referring to a place will be preceded by “xa” (where).

"póʔtu tu: iʃtalaʔpu:wán iʃtawá antsá xa: iʃtaki:tʃá:n they ate everything they desired there [in the place] where they arrived"

This example demonstrates how clauses can serve as a complement instead of a verb modifier:

"tsex paɬ kiʃoʔoníya tʃi: kli:wán ikmaʃki:yá;n, mat wan 'well, if you pay me as I say, I'll give it to you,' he says'"

Another subordinating conjunction in UNT is “tʃu nú” (because):

"mat paʃki:kán tʃu:nú: mat maʔní:ɬ lú:wa they love him because it is said that he killed the snake"

Less often, the conjunction “tʃi” is used, as in the following:

"xa: katiáɬ tʃi: wa: wánka naɬu:waskuxkán tʃu:wá he's not going to go since they told him here they're going to do community work"

It is far more common for speakers to use the prefix “li”:

"u:tsá kili:wi:li:kaní: namintsá tsamá: lú:wa tu: nakiwá they put me here because the snake that will eat me is coming"

The Spanish language has donated “porque” (because) as seen in these examples:

"nali:tʃi:yá:uw porque xa: tsex tu ɬawamá:ɬ

we are going to put you in prison because what you are doing is not good

naikwayá:n porque iktsí:nksa

I'm going to eat you because I am hungry"

UNT has the purpose modifier “ki nú,” although purpose isn't commonly expressed:

"kalaʔlóʔo tantú:n ki:nú tsex napu:ɬú:ya loosen that post so that you can pull it out"

The conjunctions “xá ʃku” and “lÍ wa” (Ch.)/”li kwá” also form subordinate clauses of purpose:

"ʃánka kamá:ki: ki:ní:t xá:ʃku: namá:sa (Pt.) store the meat well so that it won't rot"

“Pal” (if) and “pa lá” (if not) will commonly precede a conditional clause, as seen here:

"paɬ tʃu:ntsá nama:tseyí:ya kinanimá:ɬ ʔe nali:pína ti: kima:wí: if you cure my horse then you will take my wife"

“Su” and “pentú” are two other complementizers that are negative:

"nala:eɬti:yá:uw su: kit naklakalasá:n

you'll answer me or I'll hit you in the face

"ʔo: pentú natali:ma:makawani:yá:n skuxnín

or if not the officials would make you buy liquor for everyone for [doing] it"

These two are not seen very often and the former is believed to be of foreign origin. In addition to borrowing the Spanish “porque,” UNT has also borrowed the modifier “ásta” (until), as seen below:

"ásta xa: ka:ki:manóʔli tu: tsex iʃtaɬawaɬa:wán

until he knew what they were going around doing

ásta akʃní ʃtaʃtú tʃitʃiní ásta akʃní ʃtaknú: namaʔʃteʔkána

from when the sun rose until the sun set"

“Asta” has a double meaning in UNT and can be used as a marker for time when it's combined with another modifier such as “xa,” but can also be used in the adverbial sense.

== Translations ==
- In 2018, Pedro Vélez Luna translated The Little Prince to Totonac.

== See also ==
- Totonacapan (for a list of municipalities with Totonac speakers)
