= Tepehua languages =

Language cluster of Mexico

Tepehua
- Hamasipini
- Region: Mexico: Puebla, Veracruz, Hidalgo
- Ethnicity: Tepehua
- Native speakers: 9,000 (2020 census)
- Language family: Totonacan: Tepehua

Official status
- Regulated by: INALI

Language codes
- ISO 639-3: Variously: tee – Tepehua of Huehuetla tpp – Tepehua of Pisaflores tpt – Tepehua of Tlachichilco
- Glottolog: tepe1243

Tepehua is a language cluster of Mexico, spoken across a number of central Mexican states by the Tepehua people. Tepehua is a Mesoamerican language and shows many of the traits which define the Mesoamerican Linguistic Area. Along with some 67 other indigenous languages, it is recognized by a statutory law of Mexico (General Law of Linguistic Rights of the Indigenous Peoples) as an official language in the Mexican Federal District and the other administrative divisions in which it is spoken and it is on an equal footing with Spanish.

Approximate number of speakers of varieties of Tepehua
Language	ISO 639 code	Where spoken	Number of speakers
Tepehua of Huehuetla	tee	Northeastern Hidalgo, Huehuetla, and half the town of Mecapalapa in Puebla.	3,000 (1982 SIL)
Tepehua of Pisaflores	tpp	Around the town of Pisaflores, Veracruz	4,000 (1990 census)
Tepehua of Tlachichilco	tpt	Tlachichilco, Veracruz	3,000 (1990 SIL)

Huehuetla and Pisaflores are at best marginally intelligible, at 60–70% intelligibility (depending on direction). Tlachichilco has much lower intelligibility with the others, at 40% intelligibility or less.

== Morphology ==
Tepehua is an agglutinative language, where words use suffix complexes for a variety of purposes with several morphemes strung together.
