= Papantla Totonac =

Totonac language of Veracruz, Mexico

- Lowland Totonac
- Native to: Mexico
- Region: Veracruz
- Native speakers: (80,000 cited 1982)
- Language family: Totonacan: Totonac; Central; Lowland–Sierra; Papantla Totonac
- Writing system: Latin

Language codes
- ISO 639-3: top
- Glottolog: papa1238
- ELP: Papantla Totonac

Papantla Totonac, also known as Lowland Totonac, is a native American language spoken in central Mexico, in the state of Veracruz around the city of Papantla.
