= Tepehuas =

Indigenous people of Mexico

- Tepehua location map

Total population
- 16,051

Regions with significant populations
- Mexico (Hidalgo, Veracruz, Puebla)

Languages
- Tepehua languages, Spanish

Religion
- Indigenous religion, Christianity

The Tepehuas are an Indigenous people of Mexico who are based in Hidalgo, Veracruz, and Puebla. They speak Tepehua languages, which belong to the Totonacan language family.

== Name ==
Their name in Nahuatl translated to "people of the mountain". They also use endoethnonyms that originate in Spanish-influenced Nahuatl:

- masipijní: the Tepehua people
- hamasipiní: who lives on a hill
- hamasip: owners of hills

== Territory ==
They mainly live in the three east-central Mexican states of Hidalgo, Veracruz, and Puebla. The Tepehuas extend over a wide range of high settlements, between 240 and 820 metres (790 and 2,690 ft).

The Tepehua territory covers a narrow area and other eastern slopes of Sierra Madre Oriental. There are essentially three Tepehua regions:

- Huehuetla, Hidalgo
- Tlachichilco, Veracruz
- Pisaflores, Veracruz

== Divisions ==
The Tepehuas are made up of two distinct ethnolinguistic groups:

1. Tepehua del occidental (western), in Tlachichilco, Zontecomatlán and, to a lesser extent, Texcatepec.
2. Tepehua suroriental (southeastern), dispersed in Hidalgo, Puebla and Veracruz. In turn, the southeastern Tepehua ethnic group is subdivided into three:
  1. Tepehua meridional (southern): in the municipality of Huehuetla.
  2. Tepehua oriental (eastern): for centuries in the municipality of Ixhuatlán de Madero and later, during the second half of the 20th century, they moved to settle in Francisco Z. Mena (Puebla) and Pánuco (Veracruz)
  3. Tepehua poblano (Puebla): at the beginning of the 20th century this group came from Huehuetla (Hidalgo) to settle in Totonac communities of the Puebla municipalities of Francisco Z. Mena, Venustiano Carranza and mostly Pantepec.
