= Huehuetla, Hidalgo =

Huehuetla
- Town and municipality
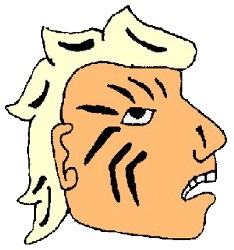
- Coat of arms

- Location within Hidalgo Location within Mexico
- Coordinates: 20°28′35″N 98°05′36″W
- Country: Mexico
- State: Hidalgo
- Municipality: Huehuetla

Government
  - Federal electoral district: Hidalgo's 4th

Area
  - Total: 262.1 km^{2} (101.2 sq mi)

Population (2005)
  - Total: 22,927
- Time zone: UTC-6 (Zona Centro)
- Website: huehuetla.hidalgo.gob.mx

Huehuetla is a town that serves as the municipal seat for one of the 84 municipalities of Hidalgo, in central-eastern Mexico.

The municipality covers an area of 262.1 km^{2} (101.2 sq mi). In 2005, the municipality had a total population of 22,927. In 2017 there were 13,012 inhabitants who spoke an indigenous language, primarily Sierra Otomi and Tepehua.
