= Mesoamerican language area =

Group of languages spoken in Mesoamerica

Approximate pre-contact distribution of native language families with presence in Mesoamerica (and elsewhere).

The Mesoamerican language area is a sprachbund containing many of the languages natively spoken in the cultural area of Mesoamerica. This sprachbund is defined by an array of syntactic, lexical and phonological traits as well as a number of ethnolinguistic traits found in the languages of Mesoamerica, which belong to a number of language families, such as Uto-Aztecan, Mayan, Totonacan, Oto-Manguean and Mixe–Zoque languages as well as some language isolates and unclassified languages known to the region.

== History of Mesoamerican areal linguistics ==
The similarities noted between many of the languages of Mesoamerica have led linguistic scholars to propose the constitution of a sprachbund, from as early as 1959. The proposal was not consolidated until 1986, however, when Lyle Campbell, Terrence Kaufman and Thomas Smith-Stark employed a rigid linguistic analysis to demonstrate that the similarities between a number of languages were indeed considerable, with the conclusion that their origins were very likely caused by diffusion rather than inheritance, the standard criteria for defining a sprachbund.

In their 1986 paper "Meso-America as a Linguistic Area" the above authors explored several proposed areal features of which they discarded most as being weakly attested, possibly by chance or inheritance or not confined to the Mesoamerican region. However, five traits in particular were shown to be widely attested among the languages, with boundaries coinciding with that of the Mesoamerican region and having a probable origin through diffusion. They then compared the five traits with the traits defining other language areas considered to be well-established, like the Mainland Southeast Asia linguistic area and Balkan language area. They concluded that by comparison the proposed Mesoamerican language area could indeed be considered a well-founded area: arguably "among the very strongest that are known".

They also argued that some of the discarded traits might also be taken into consideration as strengthening the proposal, but they were not sufficient by themselves to act as foundation and other well-documented traits of a more ethnolinguistic character might not be considerable as traits that are linguistic but cultural.

== Traits defining the Mesoamerican language area ==
The following is a brief description of the linguistic traits considered by Campbell, Kaufman and Smith-Stark as defining the Mesoamerican language area.

=== Nominal possession ===
Many of the Mesoamerican languages show a particular kind of construction for possession of nominals. The commonly found construction is "his noun1 noun2" meaning "noun2's noun1" ("his" often is a prefix in this construction), cf. his genitive in some Germanic languages. For example, in the Kʼicheʼ language, a Mayan language, u-tzi' le achih "the man's dog" literally means "his-dog the man". The similar construction in Nahuatl would be i:-itskʷin in tɬaːkatɬ.

=== Relational nouns ===
Another trait shared by nearly all Mesoamerican languages is relational nouns. Relational nouns are used to express spatial and other relations, much like prepositions in most Indo-European languages but composed of a noun and possessive affixes.

For example in Pipil (Uto-Aztecan):

nu-wa:n "with me" (nu- means "my")
mu-wa:n "with you" (mu- means "yours")
i-wa:n "with her" (i- means "his/her/its")

Or in Mam (Mayan):
n-wits-a "on me" (n- means "my")
t-wits "on her" (t- means "his/her/its").

=== Pied-piping with inversion ===
Pied-piping with inversion is a special word order found in wh-questions. It appears to be found in all Mesoamerican languages, but is rare outside Mesoamerica.

=== Vigesimal numeral system ===
All the languages of Mesoamerica have vigesimal, or base twenty numeral systems. This system has also spread to some languages just outside the Mesoamerican cultural area.

=== Non-verb-final syntax and absence of switch-reference ===
No language with verb-final basic word order is attested in Mesoamerica even though most of the languages bordering on Mesoamerica are verb final (SOV). Also no languages with switch reference are attested in Mesoamerica, but this is supposed by Campbell, Kaufman and Smith-Stark to be a secondary effect of the Mesoamerican languages not being verb final.

=== Widespread semantic calques ===
A strong evidence of diffusion throughout Mesoamerica is provided by a number of semantic calques widely found throughout the area.

For example, in many Mesoamerican languages the words for specific objects are constructed by compounding two different stems, and in many cases these two stems are semantically identical although linguistically unrelated.

Among these calques are:

- leg-head meaning "knee"
- deer-snake meaning "boa constrictor"
- stone-ash meaning "limestone"
- hand-neck meaning "wrist"
- bird-stone meaning "egg"
- blood-road meaning "vein"
- grind-stone meaning "molar"
- mouth meaning "edge"
- god-excrement or sun-excrement meaning "precious metal"
- hand-mother meaning "thumb"
- water-mountain meaning "town"

== Other traits ==
Other traits found in Mesoamerican languages, but not found by Campbell, Kaufman and Smith-Stark to be prominent enough to be conclusive for the proposal of the language area are:

- incorporation of bodypart nouns into verbs
- derivation of locative case forms from bodypart nouns
- whistled languages
- grammatical indication of inalienable possession
- numeral classifiers
- grammatical polite forms for second person addressees
- a special ritual language register

== See also ==
- Linguistic areas of the Americas
- Mesoamerica
- Areal linguistics
- Mesoamerican languages
