= Totozoquean languages =

Proposed language family of eastern Mexico

Totozoquean
- (proposed)
- Geographic distribution: Mexico
- Linguistic classification: Proposed language family; perhaps related to Huavean
- Subdivisions: Totonac–Tepehua; Mixe–Zoque

Language codes
- Glottolog: None
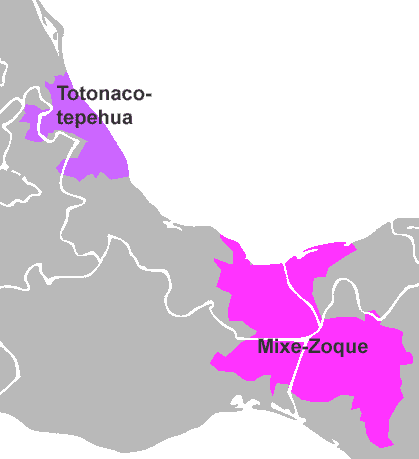

Totozoquean is a proposed language family of Mesoamerica, originally consisting of two well-established genetic groupings, Totonacan and Mixe–Zoque. The erstwhile isolate Chitimacha was later proposed to be a member. The closest relatives of Totozoquean may be the Huavean languages.

== Correspondences ==
Comparative proto-Totozoquean reconstructions are proposed in Brown et al. (2011) for simple consonants and vowels. The consonant-inventory for proto-Totozoquean is similar to that reconstructed for proto-Totonacan (Arana Osnaya 1953), and the vowels are not unlike those proposed for proto-Mixe–Zoquean (Wichmann 1995). A parallel set of laryngealized but otherwise identical proto-Totozoquean vowels is reconstructed for proto-Totozoquean to account for the distribution of laryngealized vowels in the Totonac branch of the Totonacan family, though these left no known trace in proto-Mixe–Zoquean (Wichmann 1995) and there may be a more economical explanation. Vowel length is likewise an independent parameter reconstructed for proto-Totozoquean that does not seem to affect the correspondences, but in this case it is a feature inherited by both families.

Some Totozoquean lexical correspondences have also been proposed by Davletshin (2016).

=== Vowels ===
Proto-Totozoquean (pTZ) is reconstructed with seven vowel qualities, all of which occur with long, laryngealized, and long laryngealized homologues. These reduce to a three-vowel system in proto-Totonacan (pT); length and laryngealization is retained. Proto-Mixe–Zoque (pMZ) loses laryngealization and neutralizes **ɨ~ə and **ɔ~o.

pTZ	pT	pMZ
**i	*i	*i
**e	*i	*e
**ɨ	*i	*ə
**ə	*a	*ə
**a	*a	*a
**ɔ	*a	*o
**o	*u	*o
**u	*u	*u

=== Consonants ===
Of the three consonants which do not appear in either daughter, **ty and **ny are poorly attested, whereas **ky is robust. Proto-Mixe–Zoque loses the laterals and gutturals, and neutralizes the alveolar–palato-alveolar distinction. Proto-Totonocan loses glottal stop and **y.

pTZ	pT	pMZ
**n	*n	*n
**ny	*l	*n
**l	*l	*y
**ɬ	*ɬ	*y
**ƛ	*ƛ	*y
**y	*t	*y
**t	*t	*t
**ty	*č	*t
**č	*č	*¢
**¢	*¢	*¢
**š	*š	*s
**s	*s	*s

pTZ	pT	pMZ
**p	*p	*p
**m	*m	*m
**w	*w	*w
**ky	*k	*k
**k	*q	*k
**q	*q	*ʔ
**ʔ	*∅	*ʔ
**h	*∅	*h
**#h	*h	*h
**x	*x	*h

== See also ==
- Macro-Mayan
