= Area codes in Mexico by code (900–999) =

The 900–999 range of area codes in Mexico is reserved for the states of Campeche, Chiapas, Oaxaca, Puebla, Quintana Roo, Tabasco, Veracruz, and Yucatán. The country code of Mexico is 52.

For other areas, see Area codes in Mexico by code.

City	State	Code	Ref.
Palizada	Campeche	913	
Cuauhtémoc	Tabasco	913	
Francisco I. Madero	Tabasco	913	
Frontera	Tabasco	913	
Ignacio Allende	Tabasco	913	
Jonuta	Tabasco	913	
Simón Sarlat	Tabasco	913	
Vicente Guerrero	Tabasco	913	
Ayapa	Tabasco	914	
Cunduacán	Tabasco	914	
Cucuyulapa	Tabasco	914	
Guatacalca	Tabasco	914	
Hermenegildo Galeana	Tabasco	914	
Humango	Tabasco	914	
Iquinuapa	Tabasco	914	
Jalpa de Méndez	Tabasco	914	
Libertad	Tabasco	914	
Lomitas	Tabasco	914	
Nacajuca	Tabasco	914	
Once de Febrero	Tabasco	914	
Saloya	Tabasco	914	
Soyataco	Tabasco	914	
Tapotzingo	Tabasco	914	
Catazajá	Tabasco	916	
Palenque	Chiapas	916	
Salto de Agua	Chiapas	916	
Las Garzas	Chiapas	917	
Reforma	Chiapas	917	
Estación Chontalpa	Tabasco	917	
Francisco Villa	Tabasco	917	
Huimanguillo	Tabasco	917	
Acacoyagua	Chiapas	918	
Acapetahua	Chiapas	918	
Colonia Soconusco	Chiapas	918	
El Triunfo	Chiapas	918	
Escuintla	Chiapas	918	
Flores Magón	Chiapas	918	
Hidalgo Novillero	Chiapas	918	
Hidalgo	Chiapas	918	
Mapastepec	Chiapas	918	
Pijijiapan	Chiapas	918	
Pueblo Nuevo Comaltitlán	Chiapas	918	
Sesecapa	Chiapas	918	
Altamirano	Chiapas	919	
Bachajón	Chiapas	919	
Bochil	Chiapas	919	
Chenalho	Chiapas	919	
Chilón	Chiapas	919	
Coapilla	Chiapas	919	
El Rayón	Chiapas	919	
Huitiupan	Chiapas	919	
Ixhuatan	Chiapas	919	
Jitotol de Zaragoza	Chiapas	919	
Ocosingo	Chiapas	919	
Oxchuc	Chiapas	919	
Pantelhó	Chiapas	919	
Petalcingo	Chiapas	919	
Pueblo Nuevo Solistahuacán	Chiapas	919	
Simojovel	Chiapas	919	
Solosuchiapa	Chiapas	919	
Tapilula	Chiapas	919	
Tila	Chiapas	919	
Yajalón	Chiapas	919	
Allende	Veracruz	921	
Cánticas	Veracruz	921	
Coatzacoalcos	Veracruz	921	
Ixhuatlán del Sureste	Veracruz	921	
Las Barrillas	Veracruz	921	
Lomas de Barrillas	Veracruz	921	
Nanchital de Lázaro Cárdenas del Río	Veracruz	921	
Barranca (Buenos Aires)	Veracruz	922	
Capoacan	Veracruz	922	
Chacalapa	Veracruz	922	
Chinameca	Veracruz	922	
Cosoleacaque	Veracruz	922	
Jaltipán	Veracruz	922	
La Chinantla (Poblado Diez)	Veracruz	922	
La Horqueta (Poblado Doce)	Veracruz	922	
Las Carolinas (Poblado Nueve)	Veracruz	922	
Las Lomas de Tacamichapan	Veracruz	922	
Minatitlán	Veracruz	922	
Río Uxpanapa (Poblado Catorce)	Veracruz	922	
Francisco Rueda	Tabasco	923	
La Venta	Tabasco	923	
Sánchez Magallanes	Tabasco	923	
Villa Benito Juárez (Campo Magallanes)	Tabasco	923	
Agua Dulce	Veracruz	923	
Cuichapa	Veracruz	923	
Las Choapas	Veracruz	923	
Moloacan	Veracruz	923	
El Porvenir	Oaxaca	924	
Acayucan	Veracruz	924	
Achotal	Veracruz	924	
Aguilera	Veracruz	924	
Almagres	Veracruz	924	
Campo Nuevo	Veracruz	924	
Colonia Nuevo Morelos	Veracruz	924	
Cruz del Milagro	Veracruz	924	
Dehesa	Veracruz	924	
Hermanos Cedillo	Veracruz	924	
Hidalgotitlán	Veracruz	924	
Huazuntlan	Veracruz	924	
Jesús Carranza	Veracruz	924	
Juanita	Veracruz	924	
La Cerquilla	Veracruz	924	
La Laguna Poblado Seis	Veracruz	924	
Mecayapan	Veracruz	924	
Medias Aguas	Veracruz	924	
Minzapan	Veracruz	924	
Morelos	Veracruz	924	
Niños Héroes (Los Juanes)	Veracruz	924	
Nuevo Canton (Poblado Siete)	Veracruz	924	
Poblado Cinco	Veracruz	924	
Quiamoloapan	Veracruz	924	
San Juan Evangelista	Veracruz	924	
Sayula de Alemán	Veracruz	924	
Soconusco	Veracruz	924	
Soteapan	Veracruz	924	
Suchilapan del Río	Veracruz	924	
Texistepec	Veracruz	924	
Veinticuatro de Febrero	Veracruz	924	
Ixtacomitán	Chiapas	932	
Juárez	Chiapas	932	
Pichucalco	Chiapas	932	
Jalapa	Tabasco	932	
Tacotalpa	Tabasco	932	
Tapijulapa	Tabasco	932	
Teapa	Tabasco	932	
Tequila	Tabasco	932	
Carlos Greene	Tabasco	933	
Chichicapa	Tabasco	933	
Puerto Chiltepec	Tabasco	933	
Comalcalco	Tabasco	933	
Francisco I. Madero	Tabasco	933	
José María Morelos y Pavón	Tabasco	933	
José María Pino Suárez	Tabasco	933	
Libertad	Tabasco	933	
Miguel Hidalgo	Tabasco	933	
Nicolás Bravo	Tabasco	933	
Paraíso	Tabasco	933	
Reyes Hernández	Tabasco	933	
Tecolutilla	Tabasco	933	
Villa Aldama	Tabasco	933	
La Libertad	Chiapas	934	
Arena de Hidalgo	Tabasco	934	
Balancán	Tabasco	934	
Cap. Felipe Castellanos (San Pedro)	Tabasco	934	
Chable	Tabasco	934	
El Triunfo	Tabasco	934	
Emiliano Zapata	Tabasco	934	
Tenosique	Tabasco	934	
Aquilés Serdán (San Fernando)	Tabasco	936	
Benito Juárez (San Carlos)	Tabasco	936	
Macuspana	Tabasco	936	
Ciudad Pemex	Tabasco	936	
Tepetitán	Tabasco	936	
Cárdenas	Tabasco	937	
Coronel Gregorio Mendez Magaña	Tabasco	937	
General Vicente Guerrero	Tabasco	937	
Ingenio Benito Juárez	Tabasco	937	
Miguel Hidalgo	Tabasco	937	
Río Seco	Tabasco	937	
Atasta	Campeche	938	
Ciudad del Carmen	Campeche	938	
Nuevo Progreso	Campeche	938	
San Antonio Cárdenas	Campeche	938	
Abejones	Oaxaca	951	
Agua del Espino	Oaxaca	951	
Asunción Nochixtlán	Oaxaca	951	
Ayoquezco de Aldama	Oaxaca	951	
Capulalpam de Méndez	Oaxaca	951	
Coatecas Altas	Oaxaca	951	
Cuajimoloyas (San Antonio Cuaji)	Oaxaca	951	
Ejutla de Crespo	Oaxaca	951	
El Rosario	Oaxaca	951	
Guegovela	Oaxaca	951	
Ixtlán de Juárez	Oaxaca	951	
Magdalena Teitipac	Oaxaca	951	
Miahuatlán	Oaxaca	951	
Mitla	Oaxaca	951	
Oaxaca de Juárez	Oaxaca	951	
Ocotlán de Morelos	Oaxaca	951	
Reyes Mantecón	Oaxaca	951	
San Agustín Amatengo	Oaxaca	951	
San Agustín Etla	Oaxaca	951	
San Andrés Huayapam	Oaxaca	951	
San Andrés Sinaxtla	Oaxaca	951	
San Andrés Zabache	Oaxaca	951	
San Baltazar Chichicapam	Oaxaca	951	
San Baltazar Guelavila	Oaxaca	951	
San Bartolo Coyotepec	Oaxaca	951	
San Bartolomé Zoogocho	Oaxaca	951	
San Bernardo Mixtepec	Oaxaca	951	
San Cristobal Amatlán	Oaxaca	951	
San Dionisio Ocotepec	Oaxaca	951	
San Francisco Yatee	Oaxaca	951	
San Ildefonso Villa Alta	Oaxaca	951	
San Jerónimo Tlacochahuaya	Oaxaca	951	
San José del Progreso	Oaxaca	951	
San Juan Atepec	Oaxaca	951	
San Juan Chilateca	Oaxaca	951	
San Juan del Estado	Oaxaca	951	
San Juan del Río	Oaxaca	951	
San Juan Quiotepec	Oaxaca	951	
San Lorenzo Cacaotepec	Oaxaca	951	
San Lucas Quiavini	Oaxaca	951	
San Martín Tilcajete	Oaxaca	951	
San Mateo Sindihui	Oaxaca	951	
San Miguel del Valle	Oaxaca	951	
San Miguel Sola de Vega	Oaxaca	951	
San Nicolás	Oaxaca	951	
San Pablo Huitzo	Oaxaca	951	
San Pablo Huixtepec	Oaxaca	951	
San Pablo Macuiltianguis	Oaxaca	951	
San Pedro Apóstol	Oaxaca	951	
San Pedro Cajonos	Oaxaca	951	
San Pedro Ixtlahuaca	Oaxaca	951	
San Pedro Totolapa	Oaxaca	951	
San Pedro y San Pablo Ayutla	Oaxaca	951	
San Pedro Yolox	Oaxaca	951	
San Raymundo Jalpan	Oaxaca	951	
San Vicente Coatlán	Oaxaca	951	
Santa Ana Tlapacoyan	Oaxaca	951	
Santa Ana Yareni	Oaxaca	951	
Santa Ana Zegache	Oaxaca	951	
Santa Catarina Cuixtla	Oaxaca	951	
Santa Catarina Minas	Oaxaca	951	
Santa Cruz Amilpas	Oaxaca	951	
Santa Cruz Mixtepec	Oaxaca	951	
Santa Cruz Papalutla	Oaxaca	951	
Santa Cruz Xitla	Oaxaca	951	
Santa Cruz Xoxocotlán	Oaxaca	951	
Santa Gertrudis	Oaxaca	951	
Santa Inés Yatzeche	Oaxaca	951	
Santa Lucía Ocotlán	Oaxaca	951	
Santa María Atzompa	Oaxaca	951	
Santa María Chachoapam	Oaxaca	951	
Santa María del Tule	Oaxaca	951	
Santa María Guelace	Oaxaca	951	
Santa María Zoquitlán	Oaxaca	951	
Santa Martha Chichihualtepec	Oaxaca	951	
Santiago Matatlán	Oaxaca	951	
Santo Domingo Xagacia	Oaxaca	951	
Santo Domingo Yanhuitlán	Oaxaca	951	
Santo Tomás Mazaltepec	Oaxaca	951	
Soledad Etla	Oaxaca	951	
Teococuilco de Marcos Pérez	Oaxaca	951	
Teotitlán del Valle	Oaxaca	951	
Tlacolula de Matamoros	Oaxaca	951	
Trapiche de Santa Cruz	Oaxaca	951	
Trinidad de Viguera	Oaxaca	951	
Trinidad Zaachila	Oaxaca	951	
Villa de Etla	Oaxaca	951	
Villa Hidalgo	Oaxaca	951	
Villa Talea de Castro	Oaxaca	951	
Yogana	Oaxaca	951	
Zaachila	Oaxaca	951	
Zimatlán de Alvarez	Oaxaca	951	
Asunción Atoyaquillo	Oaxaca	953	
Chalcatongo de Hidalgo	Oaxaca	953	
Ciudad de Huajuapan de León	Oaxaca	953	
Coicoyan de Las Flores	Oaxaca	953	
Guadalupe de Cisneros	Oaxaca	953	
Guadalupe de Ramírez	Oaxaca	953	
Guadalupe la Huertilla	Oaxaca	953	
Ixpantepec Nieves	Oaxaca	953	
Mariscala de Juárez	Oaxaca	953	
Mesones Hidalgo San José	Oaxaca	953	
Putla Villa de Guerrero	Oaxaca	953	
San Agustín Atenango	Oaxaca	953	
San Antonino Monte Verde	Oaxaca	953	
San Jorge Nuchita	Oaxaca	953	
San Juan Bautista Coixtlahuaca	Oaxaca	953	
San Juan Lagunas	Oaxaca	953	
San Juan Mixtepec -distr. 08-	Oaxaca	953	
San Marcos Arteaga	Oaxaca	953	
San Martín Peras	Oaxaca	953	
San Miguel Ahuehuetitlán	Oaxaca	953	
San Miguel El Grande	Oaxaca	953	
San Miguel Tlacotepec	Oaxaca	953	
San Nicolás Hidalgo	Oaxaca	953	
San Pedro y San Pablo Teposcolula	Oaxaca	953	
San Sebastián del Monte	Oaxaca	953	
San Sebatían Nicananduta	Oaxaca	953	
Santa Catarina Ticua	Oaxaca	953	
Santa Cruz (Santa Cruz Mixtepex)	Oaxaca	953	
Santa Cruz Tacache de Mina	Oaxaca	953	
Santa María Chilapa de Díaz	Oaxaca	953	
Santiago Ayuquililla	Oaxaca	953	
Santiago Cacaloxtepec	Oaxaca	953	
Santiago Chazumba	Oaxaca	953	
Santiago Juxtlahuaca	Oaxaca	953	
Santiago Tamazola	Oaxaca	953	
Santiago Yolomécatl	Oaxaca	953	
Santiago Yosondua	Oaxaca	953	
Santo Domingo Tonalá	Oaxaca	953	
Santos Reyes Tepejillo	Oaxaca	953	
Silacayoapam	Oaxaca	953	
Tezoatlán de Segura y Luna	Oaxaca	953	
Tlaxiaco	Oaxaca	953	
Villa de Tamazulapam del Progreso	Oaxaca	953	
Villa Tejupam de la Unión	Oaxaca	953	
Yetla de Juárez	Oaxaca	953	
Yucuquimi de Ocampo	Oaxaca	953	
Zapotitlán Palmas	Oaxaca	953	
Acatlán de Osorio	Puebla	953	
Chila de las Flores	Puebla	953	
Hermenegildo Galeana	Puebla	953	
Petlalcingo	Puebla	953	
San Jerónimo Xayacatlán	Puebla	953	
San Vicente Boquerón	Puebla	953	
Tianguistengo	Puebla	953	
Xayacatlán de Bravo (municipality)	Puebla	953	
Bajos de Chila	Oaxaca	954	
Camotinchan	Oaxaca	954	
Chacahua	Oaxaca	954	
Collantes	Oaxaca	954	
Corralero	Oaxaca	954	
El Carrizo	Oaxaca	954	
El Ciruelo	Oaxaca	954	
José María Morelos (Poza Verde)	Oaxaca	954	
La Reforma	Oaxaca	954	
Mancuernas	Oaxaca	954	
Mártires de Tacubaya	Oaxaca	954	
Pinotepa de Don Luis	Oaxaca	954	
Pinotepa Nacional	Oaxaca	954	
Puerto Escondido	Oaxaca	954	
Río Grande	Oaxaca	954	
San Agustín Chayuco	Oaxaca	954	
San Andrés Huaxpaltepec	Oaxaca	954	
San Antonio Ocotlán	Oaxaca	954	
San Antonio Tepetlapa	Oaxaca	954	
San Gabriel Mixtepec	Oaxaca	954	
San José del Progreso (Mp. Villa)	Oaxaca	954	
San José Estancia Grande	Oaxaca	954	
San Juan Bautista lo de Soto	Oaxaca	954	
San Juan Cabeza del Río	Oaxaca	954	
San Juan Cacahuatepec	Oaxaca	954	
San Juan Jicayan	Oaxaca	954	
San Juan Quiahije	Oaxaca	954	
San Miguel Panixtlahuaca	Oaxaca	954	
San Miguel Tlacamama	Oaxaca	954	
San Pedro Amuzgos	Oaxaca	954	
San Pedro Atoyac	Oaxaca	954	
San Pedro de Tututepec	Oaxaca	954	
San Pedro Juchatengo	Oaxaca	954	
San Pedro Mixtepec Distrito 22	Oaxaca	954	
San Pedro Tulixtlahuaca	Oaxaca	954	
San Sebastián Ixcapa	Oaxaca	954	
San Vicente Piñas	Oaxaca	954	
Santa Catarina Juquila	Oaxaca	954	
Santa Catarina Mechoacán	Oaxaca	954	
Santa Cruz Itundujia	Oaxaca	954	
Santa María Cortijo	Oaxaca	954	
Santa María El Rincón	Oaxaca	954	
Santa María Ipalapa	Oaxaca	954	
Santa María Magdalena Tiltepec	Oaxaca	954	
Santa María Zacatepec	Oaxaca	954	
Santiago Ixtayutla	Oaxaca	954	
Santiago Jamiltepec	Oaxaca	954	
Santiago Jocotepec	Oaxaca	954	
Santiago Llano Grande	Oaxaca	954	
Santiago Yaitepec	Oaxaca	954	
Santos Reyes Nopala	Oaxaca	954	
Tataltepec de Valdés	Oaxaca	954	
Villa Nueva	Oaxaca	954	
Zaragoza	Oaxaca	954	
Zocoteaca de León	Oaxaca	954	
Bahía de Huatulco (Crucesita)	Oaxaca	958	
Candelaria Loxicha	Oaxaca	958	
Paso Ancho	Oaxaca	958	
Puerto Ángel	Oaxaca	958	
San Agustín Loxicha	Oaxaca	958	
San Baltazar Loxicha	Oaxaca	958	
San Bartolomé Loxicha	Oaxaca	958	
San Francisco Cozoaltepec	Oaxaca	958	
San José Chacalapa	Oaxaca	958	
San Pedro Pochutla	Oaxaca	958	
Santa Catarina Loxicha	Oaxaca	958	
Santa María Huatulco	Oaxaca	958	
Santa María Tonameca	Oaxaca	958	
Santo Domingo de Morelos	Oaxaca	958	
Álvaro Obregón	Chiapas	961	
Berriozabal	Chiapas	961	
Chiapa de Corzo	Chiapas	961	
Chicoasén	Chiapas	961	
Copoya	Chiapas	961	
El Jobo	Chiapas	961	
El Sabino	Chiapas	961	
Ixtapa	Chiapas	961	
Juan del Grijalva	Chiapas	961	
Julián Grajales	Chiapas	961	
Osumacinta	Chiapas	961	
Salvador Urbina	Chiapas	961	
San Fernando	Chiapas	961	
Soyaló	Chiapas	961	
Suchiapa	Chiapas	961	
Tuxtla Gutiérrez	Chiapas	961	
Veinte de Noviembre	Chiapas	961	
Villa de Acala	Chiapas	961	
Agustín de Iturbide	Chiapas	962	
Álvaro Obregón	Chiapas	962	
Belisario Domínguez	Chiapas	962	
Cacahoatán	Chiapas	962	
Carrillo Puerto	Chiapas	962	
Ciudad Hidalgo	Chiapas	962	
Frontera Hidalgo	Chiapas	962	
La Libertad	Chiapas	962	
Mazapa de Madero	Chiapas	962	
Metapa de Domínguez	Chiapas	962	
Motozintla	Chiapas	962	
Puerto Madero (San Benito)	Chiapas	962	
Salvador Urbina	Chiapas	962	
Santo Domingo	Chiapas	962	
Suchiate	Chiapas	962	
Tapachula	Chiapas	962	
Tuxtla Chico	Chiapas	962	
Unión Juárez	Chiapas	962	
Chicomuselo	Chiapas	963	
Ciudad Cuauhtémoc	Chiapas	963	
Comitán de Domínguez	Chiapas	963	
El Pacayal	Chiapas	963	
Frontera Comalapa	Chiapas	963	
José María Morelos	Chiapas	963	
Juan Sabines	Chiapas	963	
La Independencia	Chiapas	963	
La Trinitaria	Chiapas	963	
Las Margaritas	Chiapas	963	
Nuevo Amatenango	Chiapas	963	
Rodulfo Figueroa	Chiapas	963	
Sabinalito	Chiapas	963	
San Caralampio	Chiapas	963	
Siltepec	Chiapas	963	
Tzimol	Chiapas	963	
Buenos Aires (Zinacántal)	Chiapas	964	
El Ingenio Azucarero	Chiapas	964	
Huehuetán	Chiapas	964	
Huixtla	Chiapas	964	
Mazatán	Chiapas	964	
Tuzantán	Chiapas	964	
Cristóbal Obregón	Chiapas	965	
Cuauhtémoc	Chiapas	965	
Doctor Domingo Chanona	Chiapas	965	
El Parral	Chiapas	965	
Guadalupe Victoria (Lázaro Cárd)	Chiapas	965	
Jesús María Garza	Chiapas	965	
Manuel Avila Camacho	Chiapas	965	
Nuevo México	Chiapas	965	
Primero de Mayo	Chiapas	965	
Revolución Mexicana	Chiapas	965	
San Pedro Buenavista	Chiapas	965	
Valle Morelos	Chiapas	965	
Villa Corzo	Chiapas	965	
Villa Flores	Chiapas	965	
Villa Hidalgo	Chiapas	965	
Arriaga	Chiapas	966	
Emiliano Zapata	Chiapas	966	
La Azteca	Chiapas	966	
Tonalá	Chiapas	966	
Chamula	Chiapas	967	
Corazón de María	Chiapas	967	
Huixtán	Chiapas	967	
La Candelaria	Chiapas	967	
Rancho Nuevo	Chiapas	967	
San Cristóbal de las Casas	Chiapas	967	
San Lucas	Chiapas	967	
Tenejapa	Chiapas	967	
Cintalapa	Chiapas	968	
Copainala	Chiapas	968	
Jiquipilas	Chiapas	968	
Lázaro Cárdenas	Chiapas	968	
Ocozocoautla	Chiapas	968	
Ocuilapa de Juárez	Chiapas	968	
Raudales Malpaso	Chiapas	968	
Tecpatán	Chiapas	968	
Tierra y Libertad	Chiapas	968	
Flamboyanes	Yucatán	969	
Progreso	Yucatán	969	
Álvaro Obregón	Oaxaca	971	
Asunción Ixtaltepec	Oaxaca	971	
Chicapa de Castro	Oaxaca	971	
Espinal	Oaxaca	971	
Ixtepec	Oaxaca	971	
Juchitán	Oaxaca	971	
La Venta	Oaxaca	971	
La Ventosa	Oaxaca	971	
Morro de Mazatan	Oaxaca	971	
Salina Cruz	Oaxaca	971	
San Mateo del Mar	Oaxaca	971	
San Pedro Comitancillo	Oaxaca	971	
San Pedro Huilotepec	Oaxaca	971	
Santa María Mixtequilla	Oaxaca	971	
Santa María Xadani	Oaxaca	971	
Santiago Ixtaltepec	Oaxaca	971	
Santo Domingo Chihuitán	Oaxaca	971	
Tehuantepec	Oaxaca	971	
Unión Hidalgo	Oaxaca	971	
El Barrio de La Soledad	Oaxaca	972	
Estación Sarabia	Oaxaca	972	
Lagunas	Oaxaca	972	
Matías Romero	Oaxaca	972	
Mogoñe Estación	Oaxaca	972	
Palomares	Oaxaca	972	
San Juan Guichicovi	Oaxaca	972	
Santo Domingo Petapa	Oaxaca	972	
Tolosa Donají	Oaxaca	972	
Alfredo B. Bonfil	Campeche	981	
Campeche	Campeche	981	
China	Campeche	981	
Melchor Ocampo	Campeche	981	
Candelaria	Campeche	982	
Centenario	Campeche	982	
Champotón	Campeche	982	
División del Norte	Campeche	982	
Don Samuel	Campeche	982	
Escárcega	Campeche	982	
Felipe Carrillo Puerto	Campeche	982	
Isla Aguada	Campeche	982	
Ley Federal de Reforma Agraria	Campeche	982	
Sabancuy	Campeche	982	
Seybaplaya	Campeche	982	
Sihochac	Campeche	982	
Villa Madero	Campeche	982	
Xpujil	Campeche	983	
Bacalar	Quintana Roo	983	
Calderitas	Quintana Roo	983	
Chetumal	Quintana Roo	983	
Chunhuhub	Quintana Roo	983	
Felipe Carrillo Puerto	Quintana Roo	983	
Ingenio Álvaro Obregón	Quintana Roo	983	
Limones	Quintana Roo	983	
Mahahual	Quintana Roo	983	
Morocoy	Quintana Roo	983	
Nicolás Bravo	Quintana Roo	983	
Noh-bec	Quintana Roo	983	
Sergio Butrón Casas	Quintana Roo	983	
Subteniente López (Santa Elena)	Quintana Roo	983	
Tihosuco	Quintana Roo	983	
Ucum	Quintana Roo	983	
Xul-Ha	Quintana Roo	983	
Akumal	Quintana Roo	984	
Chemuyil	Quintana Roo	984	
Holbox	Quintana Roo	984	
Ignacio Zaragoza	Quintana Roo	984	
Kantunilkin	Quintana Roo	984	
Nuevo Xcan	Quintana Roo	984	
Playa del Carmen	Quintana Roo	984	
Puerto Aventuras	Quintana Roo	984	
Riviera Tulum	Quintana Roo	984	
Tulum	Quintana Roo	984	
Xpu Há	Quintana Roo	984	
Chemax	Yucatán	985	
Chichimila	Yucatán	985	
Dzitas	Yucatán	985	
Kaua	Yucatán	985	
Piste	Yucatán	985	
Temozón	Yucatán	985	
Valladolid	Yucatán	985	
X-can	Yucatán	985	
Yaxcaba	Yucatán	985	
Calotmul	Yucatán	986	
Colonia Yucatán	Yucatán	986	
Dzonot Carretero	Yucatán	986	
El Cuyo	Yucatán	986	
Espita	Yucatán	986	
Las Coloradas	Yucatán	986	
Panabá	Yucatán	986	
Río Lagartos	Yucatán	986	
San Felipe	Yucatán	986	
Sucila	Yucatán	986	
Tixcancal	Yucatán	986	
Tizimín	Yucatán	986	
Cozumel	Quintana Roo	987	
Acanceh	Yucatán	988	
Celestun	Yucatán	988	
Chochola	Yucatán	988	
Hocaba	Yucatán	988	
Hoctun	Yucatán	988	
Holca	Yucatán	988	
Homún	Yucatán	988	
Huhi	Yucatán	988	
Hunucma	Yucatán	988	
Izamal	Yucatán	988	
Kantunil	Yucatán	988	
Kimbila	Yucatán	988	
Kinchil	Yucatán	988	
Sahcaba	Yucatán	988	
Seye	Yucatán	988	
Sisal	Yucatán	988	
Sotuta	Yucatán	988	
Tahmek	Yucatán	988	
Tecoh	Yucatán	988	
Tetiz	Yucatán	988	
Uman	Yucatán	988	
Xocchel	Yucatán	988	
Baca	Yucatán	991	
Buctzotz	Yucatán	991	
Cacalchen	Yucatán	991	
Cansahcab	Yucatán	991	
Cenotillo	Yucatán	991	
Dzemul	Yucatán	991	
Dzidzantun	Yucatán	991	
Dzilam de Bravo	Yucatán	991	
Dzilam González	Yucatán	991	
Dzoncauich	Yucatán	991	
Ixil	Yucatán	991	
Motul	Yucatán	991	
Muxupip	Yucatán	991	
Sinanche	Yucatán	991	
Tekal de Venegas	Yucatán	991	
Tekanto	Yucatán	991	
Telchac Pueblo	Yucatán	991	
Telchac Puerto	Yucatán	991	
Temax	Yucatán	991	
Tepakan	Yucatán	991	
Tixkokob	Yucatán	991	
Tunkas	Yucatán	991	
Yobaín	Yucatán	991	
Benito Juárez	Chiapas	992	
Chiapilla	Chiapas	992	
Diamante de Echeverría	Chiapas	992	
Independencia	Chiapas	992	
Jaltenango de la Paz	Chiapas	992	
Nueva Concordia	Chiapas	992	
Presidente Echeverría (Laja Ten)	Chiapas	992	
Pujiltic	Chiapas	992	
Ricardo Flores Magón	Chiapas	992	
Socoltenango	Chiapas	992	
Soyatitán	Chiapas	992	
Teopisca	Chiapas	992	
Totolapa	Chiapas	992	
Venustiano Carranza	Chiapas	992	
Vicente Guerrero	Chiapas	992	
Villa de las Rosas	Chiapas	992	
Anacleto Canabal	Tabasco	993	
Boquerón (Guanal)	Tabasco	993	
Buena Vista Río Nuevo	Tabasco	993	
El Cerro	Tabasco	993	
González	Tabasco	993	
Guineo	Tabasco	993	
Ixtacomitán	Tabasco	993	
Lagartera	Tabasco	993	
Lázaro Cárdenas	Tabasco	993	
Luis Gil Peréz	Tabasco	993	
Macultepec-Ocuiltzapotlan	Tabasco	993	
Pablo L. Sidar	Tabasco	993	
Parrilla	Tabasco	993	
Plátano y Cacao	Tabasco	993	
Playas del Rosario (Subteniente García)	Tabasco	993	
Pueblo Nuevo de las Raices	Tabasco	993	
Tamulte de las Sábanas	Tabasco	993	
Villahermosa	Tabasco	993	
Cabeza de Toro	Chiapas	994	
Paredón	Chiapas	994	
Puerto Arista	Chiapas	994	
Tres Picos	Chiapas	994	
Chahuites	Oaxaca	994	
Huamuchil	Oaxaca	994	
La Esmeralda	Oaxaca	994	
Rincón Juárez	Oaxaca	994	
San Dionisio del Mar	Oaxaca	994	
San Francisco Ixhuatán	Oaxaca	994	
San Pedro Tapanatepec	Oaxaca	994	
Santa María Chimalapa	Oaxaca	994	
Santiago Niltepec	Oaxaca	994	
Santo Domingo Ingenio	Oaxaca	994	
Santo Domingo Zanatepec	Oaxaca	994	
El Camarón	Oaxaca	995	
Jalapa del Marque	Oaxaca	995	
La Soledad Salinas	Oaxaca	995	
Magdalena Tequisistlán	Oaxaca	995	
Nejapa de Madero	Oaxaca	995	
San Carlos Yautepec	Oaxaca	995	
San Juan Juquilla Mixes	Oaxaca	995	
San Pedro Huamelula	Oaxaca	995	
San Pedro Quiatoni	Oaxaca	995	
Santiago Astata	Oaxaca	995	
Becal	Campeche	996	
Bolonchen de Rejón	Campeche	996	
Calkini	Campeche	996	
Dzibalchen	Campeche	996	
Dzitbalche	Campeche	996	
Hecelchakan	Campeche	996	
Hopelchen	Campeche	996	
Nunkini	Campeche	996	
Pomuch	Campeche	996	
Tenabo	Campeche	996	
Vicente Guerrero (Iturbide)	Campeche	996	
Dziuche	Quintana Roo	997	
José María Morelos	Quintana Roo	997	
Saban	Quintana Roo	997	
Akil	Yucatán	997	
Chapab	Yucatán	997	
Dzan	Yucatán	997	
Halacho	Yucatán	997	
Mama	Yucatán	997	
Mani	Yucatán	997	
Maxcanú	Yucatán	997	
Muna	Yucatán	997	
Opichen	Yucatán	997	
Oxkutzcab	Yucatán	997	
Peto	Yucatán	997	
Sacalum	Yucatán	997	
Teabo	Yucatán	997	
Tekax	Yucatán	997	
Tekit	Yucatán	997	
Ticul	Yucatán	997	
Tzucacab	Yucatán	997	
Uxmal	Yucatán	997	
Xohuayan	Yucatán	997	
Alfredo V. Bonfil	Quintana Roo	998	
Cancún	Quintana Roo	998	
Isla Mujeres	Quintana Roo	998	
Leona Vicario	Quintana Roo	998	
Puerto Morelos	Quintana Roo	998	
Caucel	Yucatán	999	
Chicxulub Pueblo	Yucatán	999	
Cholul	Yucatán	999	
Conkal	Yucatán	999	
Kanasin	Yucatán	999	
Komchen	Yucatán	999	
Mérida	Yucatán	999	
Xmatkuil	Yucatán	999	
