= Buctzotz Municipality =

Municipality in the Mexican state of Yucatán

Buctzotz
- Municipality
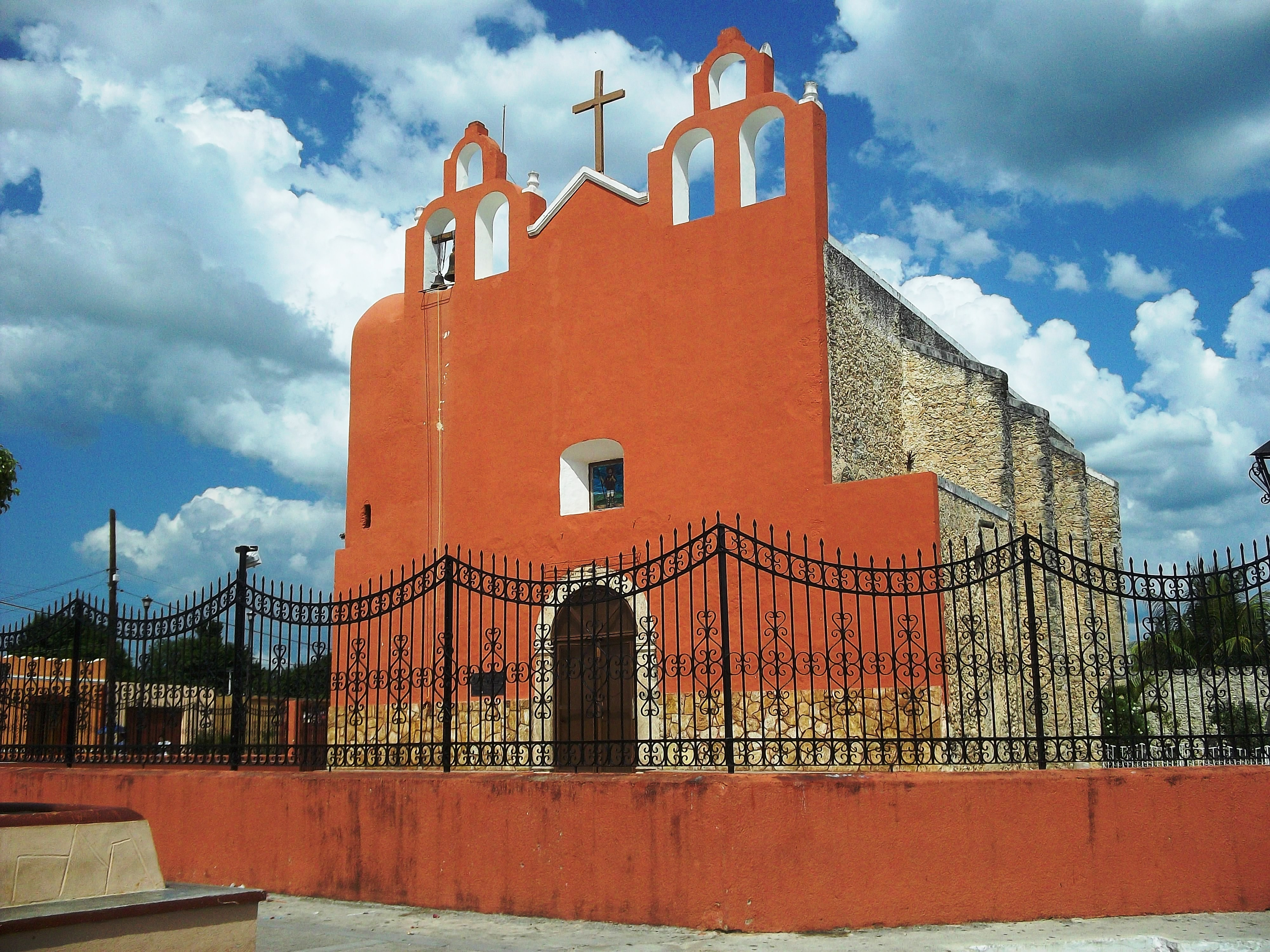
- Principal Church of Buctzotz, Yucatán

- Region 5 Noreste #006

- Location of the Municipality in Mexico
- Coordinates: 21°12′06″N 88°47′34″W
- Country: Mexico
- State: Yucatán
- Mexico Ind.: 1821
- Yucatán Est.: 1824

Government
  - Type: 2012–2015
  - Municipal President: Manuel Jesús Argaez Cepeda

Area
  - Total: 543.45 km^{2} (209.83 sq mi)
- Elevation: 7 m (23 ft)

Population (2010)
  - Total: 8,637
  - Density: 15.89/km^{2} (41.16/sq mi)
  - Demonym: Umanense
- Time zone: UTC-6 (Central Standard Time)
- INEGI Code: 006
- Major Airport: Merida (Manuel Crescencio Rejón) International Airport
- IATA Code: MID
- ICAO Code: MMMD

Buctzotz Municipality (Yucatec Maya: "dress made of hair") is a municipality in the Mexican state of Yucatán containing 543.45 km^{2} of land and is located roughly 95 kilometres (59 mi) northeast of the city of Mérida. It contains several churches and a hospital, Centre de Salud Buctzotz, in the eastern part of the main town.

== History ==
There is no accurate data on when the town was founded, but during the conquest, it became part of the encomienda system and Francisco de Montejo the Younger was the first encomendero.

Yucatán declared its independence from the Spanish Crown in 1821, and in 1825 the area was assigned to the coastal region partition of Izamal Municipality. In 1867 it was transferred to the Temax Municipality and in 1988 was confirmed as head of its own municipality.

In 1913, Buctzotz was the site of a battle of the revolutionary forces under the command of the General Juan Campos.

== Governance ==
The municipal president is elected for a three-year term. The town council has seven councilpersons, who serve as Secretary and councilors of public works, public services, ecology, parks, public sanitation, nomenclature and cemeteries.

== Communities ==
The head of the municipality is Buctzotz, Yucatán. There are 18 populated areas of the municipality which include Chuntzalam, Dzonot Sábila, Gran Lucha, Grano de Oro, Muldzonot, San Francisco, Santo Domingo, Unidad Juárez, and X-bec. The significant populations are shown below:

Community	Population
Entire Municipality (2010)	8,637
Buctzotz	7229 in 2005
La Gran Lucha	211 in 2005
San Francisco	136 in 2005
Santo Domingo	194 in 2005
X-bec	515 in 2005

== Local festivals ==
Every year from 8 to 11 January the town celebrates a festival in honor of the town patroness, the Immaculate Conception and hosts a pilgrimage in her honor between 22 and 30 August. There is also a fiesta held for Santa Clara from 13 to 25 August held annually.

== Tourist attractions ==
- Church of San Isidro Labrador, built in the sixteenth century
- Chapel of the Immaculate Conception
- Cenote Aguas Leguas
- Cenote Álvarez I
- Cenote Álvarez II
- Cenote Azuelín
- Cenote Azúl
