= Sanahcat Municipality =

Municipality in the Mexican state of Yucatán

Sanahcat
- Municipality
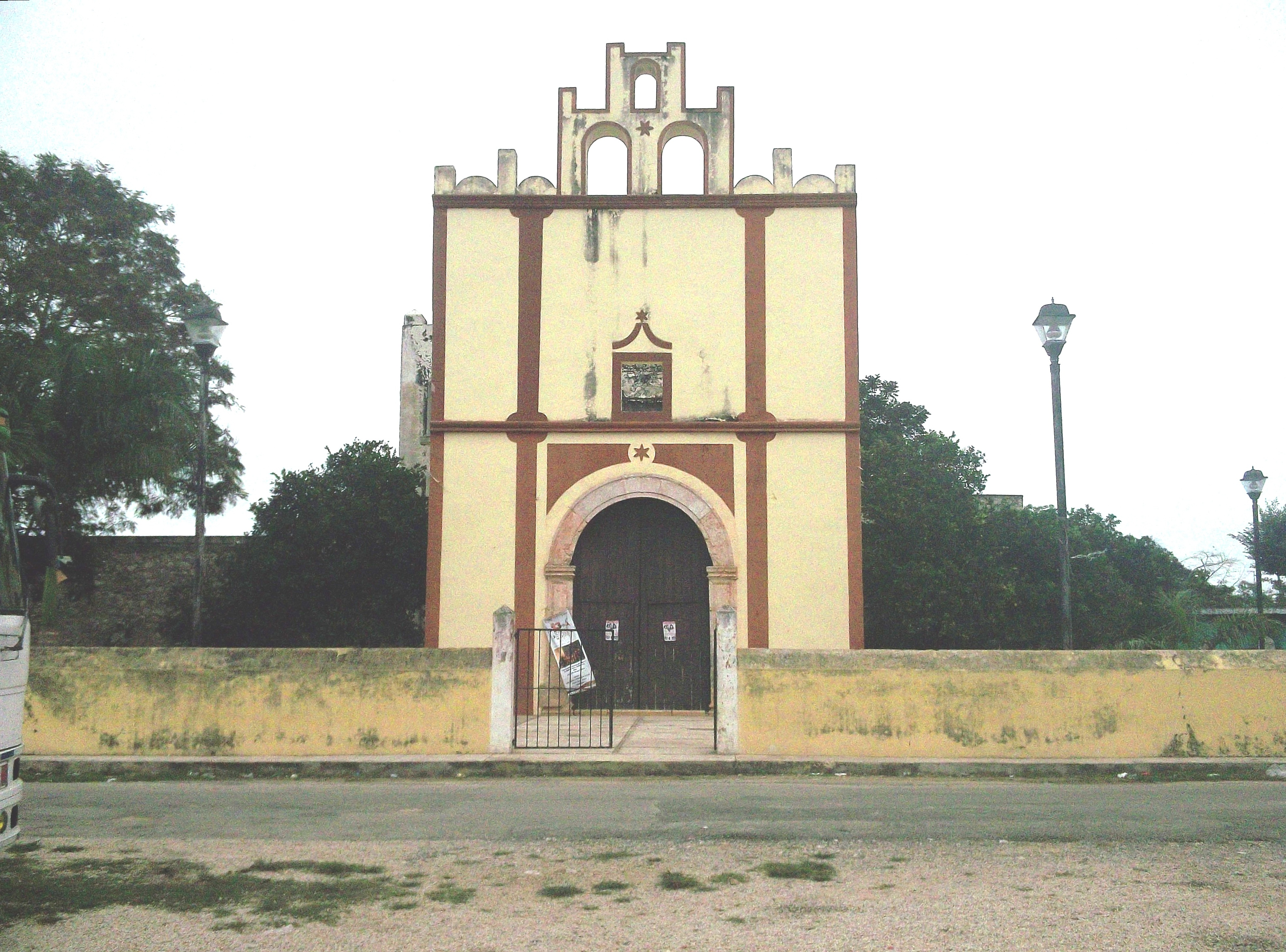
- Principal Church of Sanahcat, Yucatán

- Municipal location in Yucatán

- Location of the Municipality in Mexico
- Coordinates: 20°48′15″N 89°12′50″W
- Country: Mexico
- State: Yucatán

Government
  - Type: 2012–2015
  - Municipal President: Victor Gabriel Ek Moo

Area
  - Total: 54.93 km^{2} (21.21 sq mi)
- Elevation: 16 m (52 ft)

Population (2010)
  - Total: 1,619
- Time zone: UTC-6 (Central Standard Time)
- INEGI Code: 064
- Major Airport: Merida (Manuel Crescencio Rejón) International Airport
- IATA Code: MID
- ICAO Code: MMMD

Sanahcat Municipality is a municipality in the Mexican state of Yucatán. It contains 54.93 square kilometres (21.21 sq mi) of land and is located roughly 52 kilometres (32 mi) southeast of the city of Mérida. It is bounded on the north by Hocabá – Xocchel, on the south by Huhí, on the east Kantunil, and the west by Homún. In the Yucatec Maya language, its name means "legume of Tzalam."

== History ==
During pre-Hispanic times, the town existed but it is unclear which chieftainship it was part of. After the conquest the area became part of the encomienda system. In 1565 the encomienderos were Melchor and Francisco Pacheco.

Yucatán declared its independence from the Spanish Crown in 1821 and in 1825, the area was assigned to the Beneficios Bajos region with its headquarters in Sotuta. Development of the area started in 1821. In 1900, it split away from Hocabá. On 29 September 1924 Sanahcat was elevated to a municipality and in 1937 the Haciendas Tixcacal Xtohil and Ancona were withdrawn from its jurisdiction.

== Governance ==
The municipal president is elected for a three-year term. The town council has four councilpersons, who serve as Secretary and councilors of public works; parks and gardens; and cemeteries.

The Municipal Council administers the business of the municipality. It is responsible for budgeting and expenditures and producing all required reports for all branches of the municipal administration. Annually it determines educational standards for schools.

The Police Commissioners ensure public order and safety. They are tasked with enforcing regulations, distributing materials and administering rulings of general compliance issued by the council.

== Communities ==
The head of the municipality is Sanahcat, Yucatán. The other populated area is the Hacienda Tixcacal Leal. The significant populations are shown below: The current president of the municipality is Victor Gabriel Ek Moo (period 2012–2015).

| Community | Population |
|---|---|
| Entire Municipality (2010) | 1,619 |
| Sanahcat | 1509 in 2005 |

The electoral rolls of the municipality belongs to the Fifth Federal Electoral District and Local Fourteenth Ward.

== Local festivals ==
Every year on the 15th of August a celebration in honor of Our Lady of the Assumption is held.

== Tourist attractions ==
- Church of Our Lady of the Assumption built in the 16th century
- Cenote Pishtón
- Hacienda Tixcacal Leal

On the way to Momain, there is a church at Sanathcat which is roughly finished and is built to a "T-plan". The chapel has an arch feature and has a belfry. The church built in the sixteenth century. is dedicated to Our Lady of the Assumption.

== Bibliography ==
- Perry, Richard D.; Perry, Rosalind (2002). Maya Missions: Exploring Colonial Yucatan. Espada├▒a Press. ISBN 978-0-9620811-9-4.
