= Juxtlahuaca District =

- District
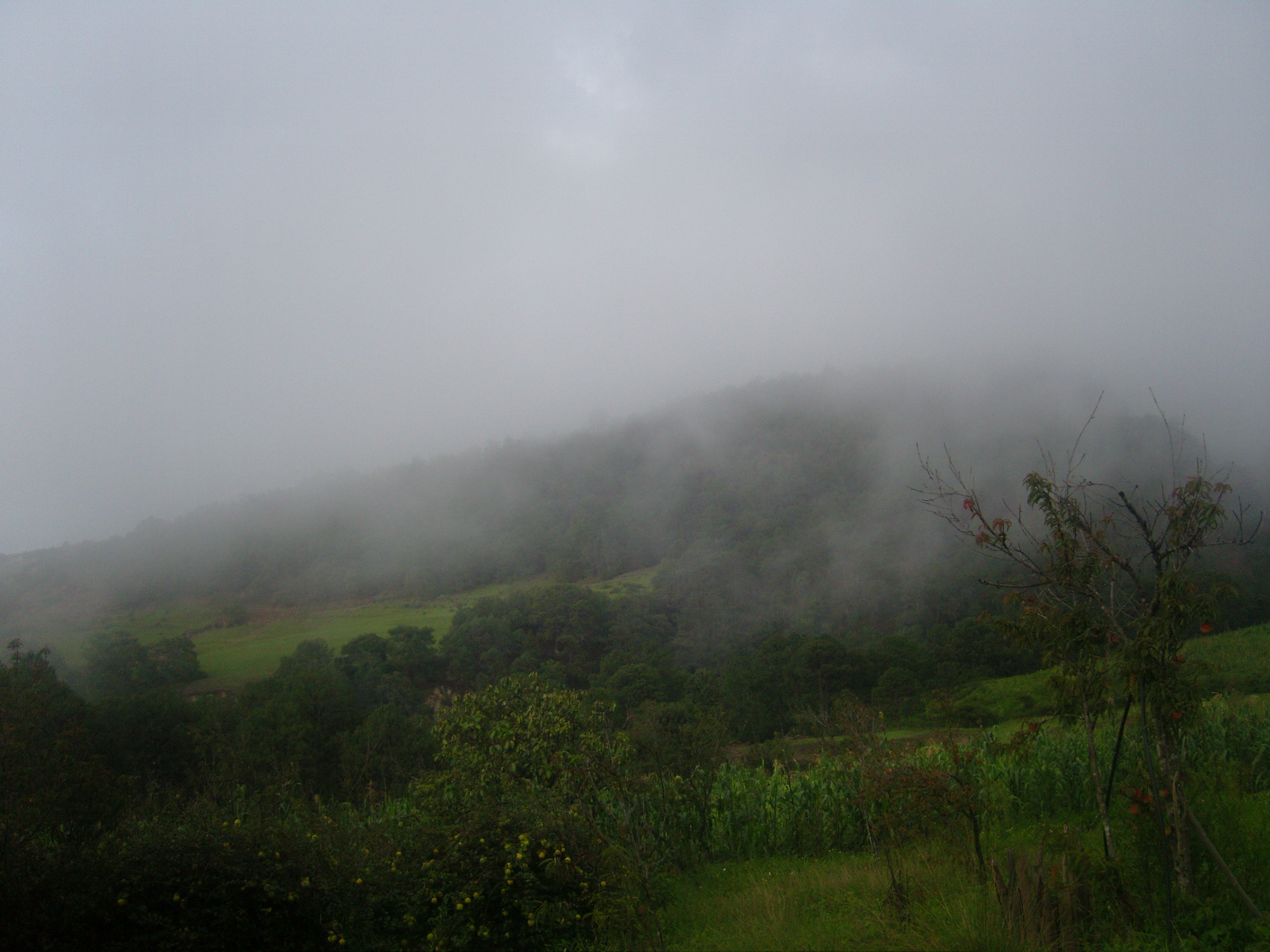
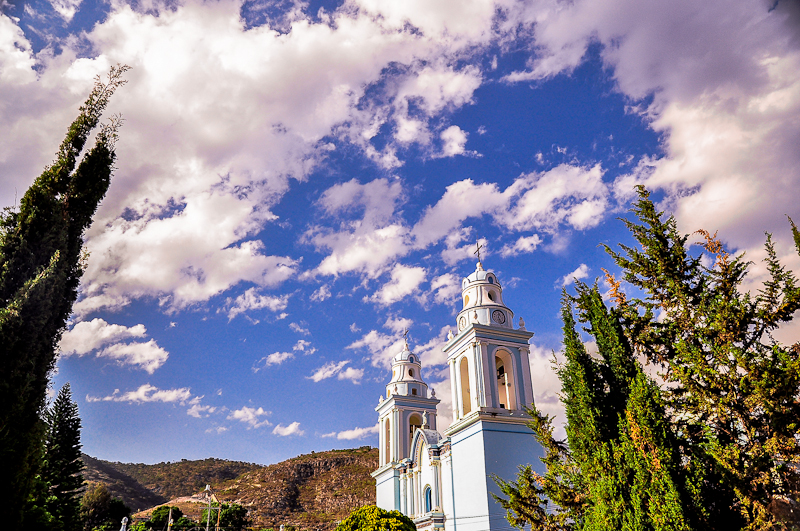
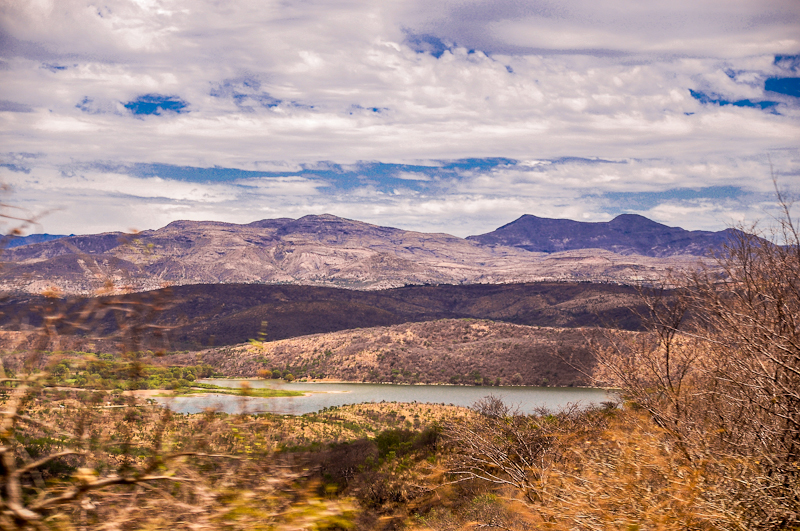
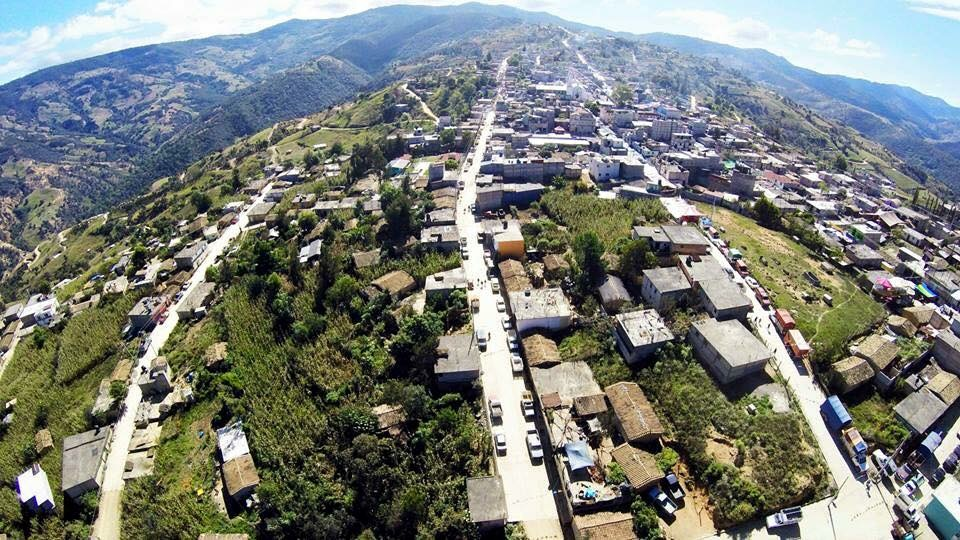
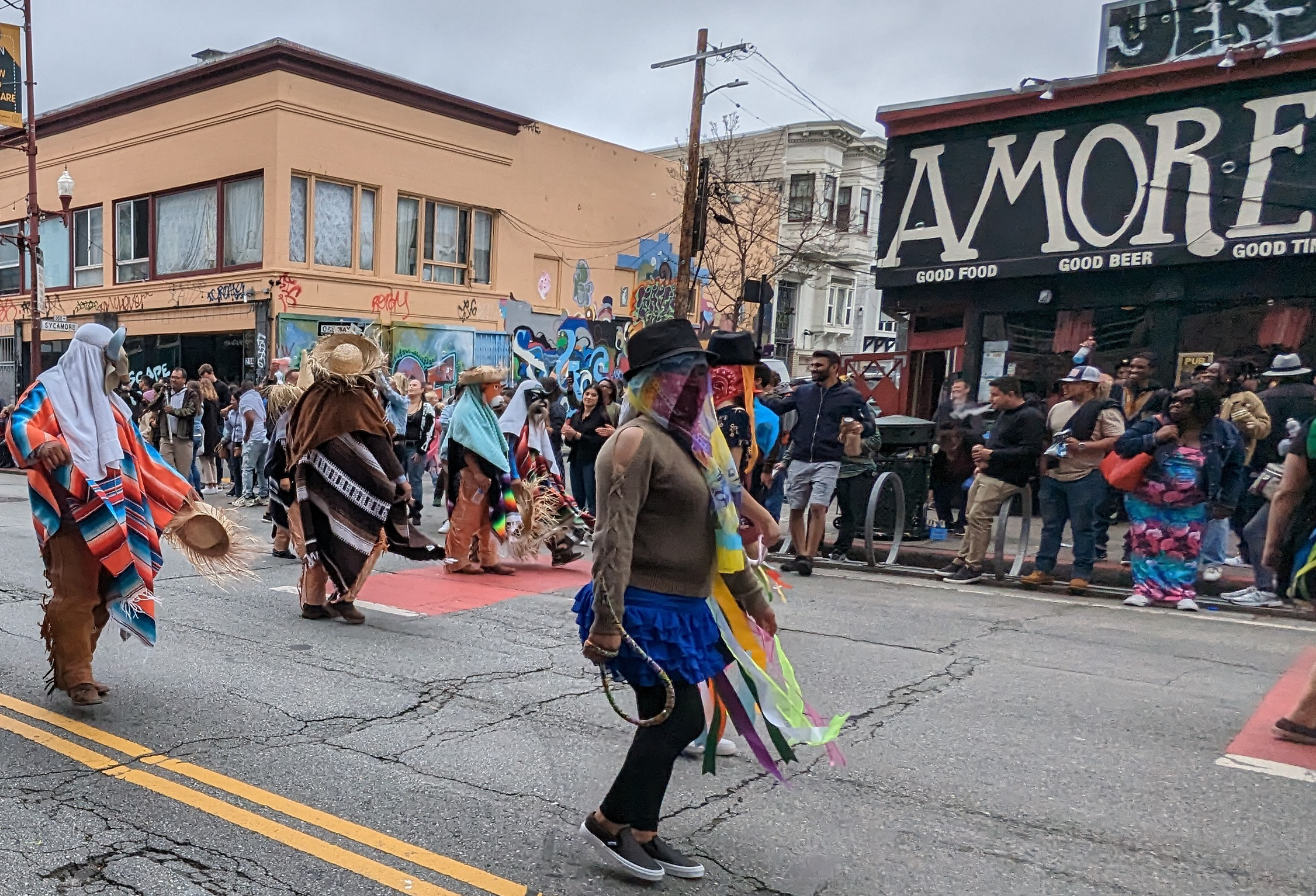
- Top: Cloud Forest at San Juan Mixtepec; Middle: San Sebastián Tecomaxtlahuaca Landscape, San Sebastián Tecomaxtlahuaca Church; Bottom: San Martín Peras, Santiago Juxtlahuaca

- Oaxaca regions and districts: Mixteca to Northwest
- Coordinates: 17°43′N 97°19′W
- Country: Mexico
- State: Oaxaca

Population (2020)
  - Total: 75,871

Juxtlahuaca District is located in the southwest of the Mixteca Region of the State of Oaxaca, Mexico. The largest town is Santiago Juxtlahuaca. The district is at an average elevation of 1,690 meters above sea level, and has an area of 1,848 km^{2}. It is divided into seven municipalities, and as of 2020 had 281 settlements with a total population of 75,871.

== History ==
Juxtlahuaca district was created by decree on 14 October 1868. It was briefly merged into the Silacayoapan district in January 1872, then restored in December 1872. In December 1906 the district was merged into the Tlaxiaco district, but on 23 January 1932 the district was finally restored.

== Climate and economy ==
The climate is temperate, with average temperature of 21°C. Rainfall is variable, mainly between June and September, and ranging fr4om 600mm to 2,200mm. The land is forested with trees that include pine, fir, oak, alder, fig, avocado, mahogany and cedar. Fauna include squirrel, opossum, rabbit, mountain lion, coyote, fox, gray owl, owl bells, wild cat, rat, civet, tree frog and rattlesnake.

Principal occupations as of 2000 were Agriculture, hunting and fishing 54%, Mining, petroleum, manufacturing, construction and electricity 16% and Trade, tourism and services 26%. Agricultural products include maize and beans, as well as coffee, sugarcane and fruits. Animal husbandry includes the care and breeding of cattle, goats, horses, sheep and poultry.

== Municipalities ==

The district includes the following municipalities:

Municipality code	Name	Population		Land Area			Population density	
Municipality code	Name	2020	Rank	km^{2}	sq mi	Rank	2020	Rank
016	Coicoyan de las Flores	9,563	3	126.1	48.7	5	76/km^{2} (196/sq mi)	1
208	San Juan Mixtepec-Distrito 08	6,941	5	358.2	138.3	2	19/km^{2} (50/sq mi)	6
242	San Martín Peras	12,436	2	242.7	93.7	3	51/km^{2} (133/sq mi)	4
286	San Miguel Tlacotepec	3,100	6	55.58	21.46	6	56/km^{2} (144/sq mi)	3
348	San Sebastián Tecomaxtlahuaca	8,192	4	230.9	89.2	4	35/km^{2} (92/sq mi)	5
469	Santiago Juxtlahuaca	34,735	1	774.1	298.9	3	60/km^{2} (155/sq mi)	2
528	Santos Reyes Tepejillo	904	7	52.98	20.46	7	17/km^{2} (44/sq mi)	7
	Distrito Juxtlahuaca	75,871	—	1,841	710.81	—	41/km^{2} (107/sq mi)	—
Source: INEGI

== See also ==
- Municipalities of Oaxaca
