= Cenotillo Municipality =

Municipality in the Mexican state of Yucatán

Cenotillo
- Municipality
- Coat of arms

- Region 5 Noreste #012

- Location of the Municipality in Mexico
- Coordinates: 20°57′56″N 88°36′09″W
- Country: Mexico
- State: Yucatán
- Mexico Ind.: 1821
- Yucatán Est.: 1824

Government
  - Type: 2012–2015
  - Municipal President: Sonia Noemí Vallejos Albornoz

Area
  - Total: 614.43 km^{2} (237.23 sq mi)
- Elevation: 26 m (85 ft)

Population (2010)
  - Total: 3,701
  - Density: 6.023/km^{2} (15.60/sq mi)
  - Demonym: Umanense
- Time zone: UTC-6 (Central Standard Time)
- INEGI Code: 012
- Major Airport: Merida (Manuel Crescencio Rejón) International Airport
- IATA Code: MID
- ICAO Code: MMMD

Cenotillo Municipality (Spanish: "little cenote") is a municipality in the Mexican state of Yucatán containing 614.43 km^{2} of land and is located roughly 115 kilometres (71 mi) east of the city of Mérida.

== History ==
There is no accurate data on when the town was founded, but before the conquest, it was part of the chieftainship of Cupules. After colonization, it became part of the encomienda system and some of the first encomenderos were Diego Burgos and don Diego López de Ricalde in 1583, followed by Lorenzo Coella in 1627. Subsequent encomenderos included José Domingo Pardío in 1744.

Yucatán declared its independence from the Spanish Crown in 1821, and in 1825 the area was assigned to the Valladolid Municipality. In 1867, it was assigned to the Espita Municipality and in 1988 it was confirmed as head of its own municipality.

== Governance ==
The municipal president is elected for a three-year term. The town council has four councilpersons, who serve as Secretary and councilors of sports, parks and gardens, and potable water.

== Communities ==
The head of the municipality is Cenotillo, Yucatán. The populated areas of the municipality besides the seat include Cantún, Chunyucú, Cunyá, Ebtún, Kakalhá, Karin, Kaxec, Mococa, Muctal, Ocal, Pacel, Palmero, Petil, San Antonio, San Felipe, San Nicolás, San Pedro, San Ruto, Santa Clara, Sihonal, Tixbacab, Tzumbalam, Yodzonot 2 and Yohman. The significant populations are shown below:

Community	Population
Entire Municipality (2010)	3,701
Cenotillo	3134 in 2005
Tixbacab	349 in 2005

== Local festivals ==
Every year from 3 to 13 August a festival is held in honor of Santa Clara in Cenotillo. In Tixbacab from the 13 to 15 August there is an annual celebration for the Virgin of the Assumption.

== Tourist attractions ==
- Church of Santa Clara, built in the seventeenth century
- Church of the Virgin of the Nativity, built in the seventeenth century
- archaeological site at Tzebtun
- Cenote A´yin
- Cenote Catak Dzonot
- Cenote Itzamna
- Cenote K´ai-pech
- Cenote Mul´Dzonot
- Hacienda Tixbacab
