= Dzoncauich Municipality =

Municipality in the Mexican state of Yucatán

Dzoncauich
- Municipality
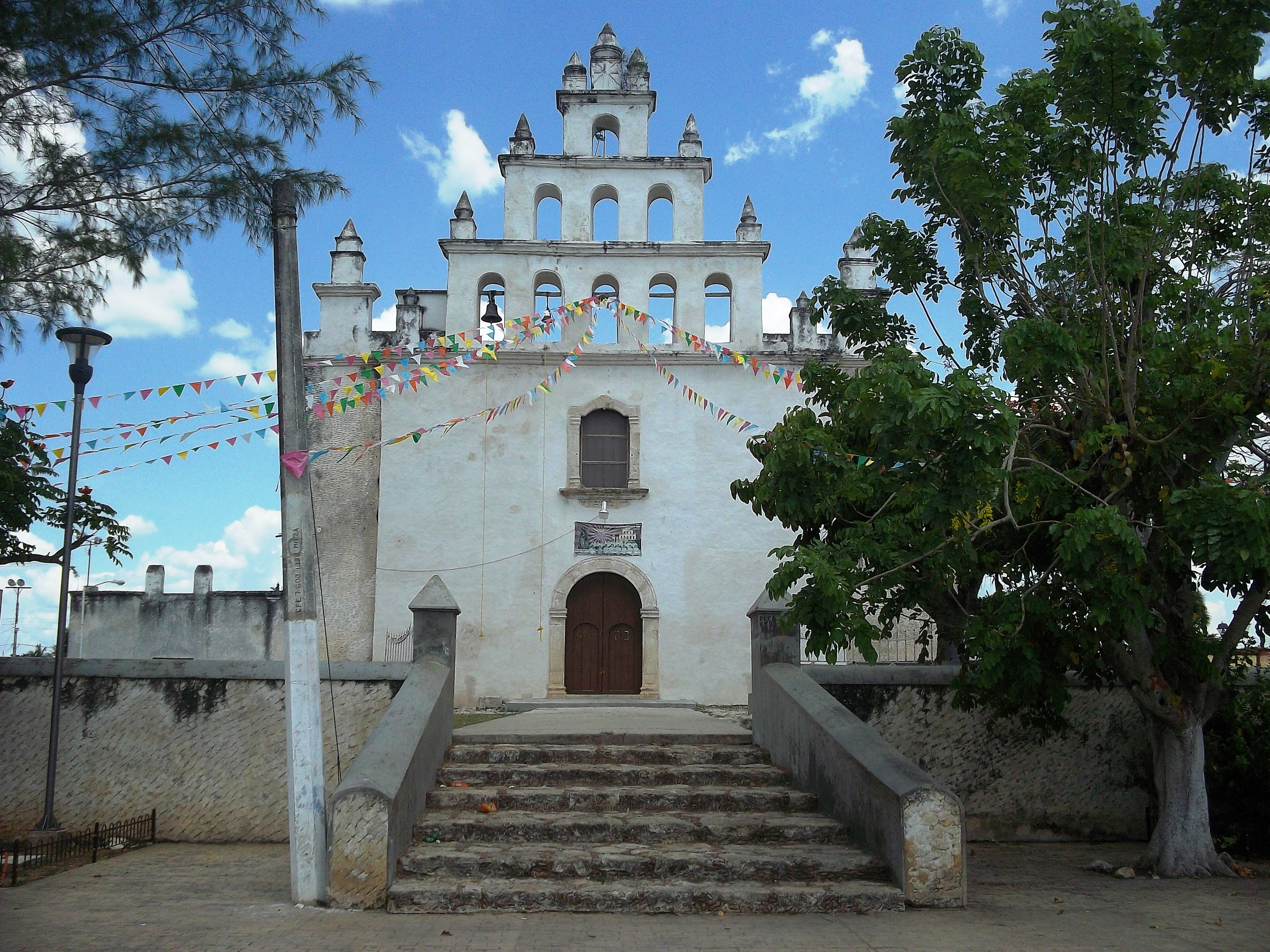
- Principal Church of Dzoncauich, Yucatán

- Region 4 Litoral centro #031

- Location of the Municipality in Mexico
- Coordinates: 21°07′40″N 88°53′26″W
- Country: Mexico
- State: Yucatán

Government
  - Type: 2012–2015
  - Municipal President: Renan Alberto Cocom Verde

Area
  - Total: 355.12 km^{2} (137.11 sq mi)
- Elevation: 7 m (23 ft)

Population (2010)
  - Total: 2,772
- Time zone: UTC-6 (Central Standard Time)
- INEGI Code: 009
- Major Airport: Merida (Manuel Crescencio Rejón) International Airport
- IATA Code: MID
- ICAO Code: MMMD

Dzoncauich Municipality (In the Yucatec Maya Language: “Cauich's rifle”) is a municipality in the Mexican state of Yucatán containing 355.12 km^{2} of land and located roughly 85 km northeast of the city of Mérida.

== History ==
During pre-Hispanic times, the area was part of the chieftainship of Ah Kinchel. After the conquest the area became part of the encomienda system and as early as 1549 the encomendero was Alonso Julián. Later, the encomienda was shared by Francisco Dorado and Ignacio Barbosa Briceño in 1689.

Yucatán declared its independence from the Spanish Crown in 1821 and in 1825, the area was assigned to the coastal region with its headquarters in Izamal. In 1905, it was a part of the Temax Municipality but became head of its own municipality in 1928.

== Governance ==
The municipal president is elected for a three year term. The town council has eight aldermen and two trustees, who serve as Secretary of the Town Hall; Treaturer; legal coordinator; education coordinator; sports coordinator; tourism coordinator; coordinator of social communication; coordinator of dissemination, civic promotion and recreation; director of public works; director of urban planning; coordinator of the House of Culture; director of security, roads and transportation; and director of health issues and social welfare.

The Municipal Council administers the business of the municipality. It is responsible for budgeting and expenditures and producing all required reports for all branches of the municipal administration. Annually it determines educational standards for schools.

The Police Commissioners ensure public order and safety. They are tasked with enforcing regulations, distributing materials and administering rulings of general compliance issued by the council.

== Communities ==
The head of the municipality is Dzoncauich, Yucatán. The other populated areas in the municipality are Chacmay and the Haciendas of: Mario, San Matias and San Pedro. The significant populations are shown below:

Community	Population
Entire Municipality (2010)	2,772
Chacmay	458 in 2005
Dzoncauich	2323 in 2005

== Local festivals ==
Every year on 8 August a celebration is held in honor of the patron saint of the town, San Juan Bautista.

== Tourist attractions ==
- Church of St. John the Baptist, built in the seventeenth century
