= Kots Kaal Pato =

Kots Kaal Pato was an event held annually in the town of Citilcum, located in the municipality of Izamal, within the state of Yucatán, Mexico. In it, piñatas stuffed with live animals were broken and ducks were hung from a wooden structure to later behead them. Since 2016, as a result of the efforts of Humane Society International Mexico and local organizations, the event no longer has this type of practices, instead featuring various sports and cultural activities.

== History ==
The origin or meaning of this tradition is unknown. According to an interview conducted by Vice magazine, one of the oldest inhabitants of the town declared: "We do not know the origin of the tradition. I learned it from my parents and my parents from their parents." Previously, it was held around a large tree located in the center of the town, but when it was knocked down in 2002 by Hurricane Isidore, the event was moved to a nearby park.

== Celebration ==
Days before the celebration date, a gallows would be set up in a park next to the municipal police station. The night before the celebration, the local children would gather various animals, including iguanas and opossums, generically called alimañas.

The day of the event would begin by smashing piñatas, which would be filled with the creatures captured the day before. Most die from blows or from being thrown to the ground, and those who survive would later be crushed.

Several ducks would then tied to the gallows by their legs, and a contest would begin. Participants would need to jump to grab one of the birds by the head or neck; whoever could pull it off would win the creature's body as a reward.

== See also ==
- Animal cruelty in Mexico
