= Santiago Tapextla =

Coordinates: 16°19′N 98°23′W

- Municipality and town
- Interactive map of Santiago Tapextla
- Country: Mexico
- State: Oaxaca
- Time zone: UTC-6 (Central Standard Time)

Santiago Tapextla is a town and municipality in Oaxaca in southeastern Mexico and is the westernmost municipality in Oaxaca. The municipality covers an area of 128.8 km^{2}. It is located in the Jamiltepec District in the west of the Costa Region.

As of 2005, the municipality had a total population of .
