= Jamiltepec District =

- District
- Oaxaca regions and districts: Costa Region in Southwest
- Coordinates: 16°17′N 97°49′W
- Country: Mexico
- State: Oaxaca

Population (2020)
  - Total: 195,673

Jamiltepec District is located in the west of the Costa Region of the State of Oaxaca, Mexico. It is the westernmost district in Oaxaca.

== Municipalities ==
The district includes the following municipalities:

| Municipality code | Name | Population | | Land Area | | | Population density | |
| Municipality code | Name | 2020 | Rank | km^{2} | sq mi | Rank | 2020 | Rank |
|---|---|---|---|---|---|---|---|---|
| 056 | Mártires de Tacubaya | 1,446 | 22 | 57.53 | 22.21 | 23 | 25/km^{2} (65/sq mi) | 19 |
| 070 | Pinotepa de Don Luis | 6,416 | 8 | 67.36 | 26.01 | 20 | 95/km^{2} (247/sq mi) | 3 |
| 082 | San Agustín Chayuco | 4,163 | 16 | 151 | 58 | 7 | 28/km^{2} (71/sq mi) | 18 |
| 090 | San Andrés Huaxpaltepec | 6,234 | 9 | 87.63 | 33.83 | 14 | 71/km^{2} (184/sq mi) | 6 |
| 111 | San Antonio Tepetlapa | 4,873 | 12 | 69.41 | 26.80 | 19 | 70/km^{2} (182/sq mi) | 7 |
| 168 | San José Estancia Grande | 938 | 24 | 65.87 | 25.43 | 21 | 14/km^{2} (37/sq mi) | 23 |
| 180 | San Juan Bautista lo de Soto | 2,344 | 21 | 72.12 | 27.85 | 18 | 33/km^{2} (84/sq mi) | 14 |
| 185 | San Juan Cacahuatepec | 8,939 | 7 | 202.6 | 78.2 | 6 | 44/km^{2} (114/sq mi) | 10 |
| 188 | San Juan Colorado | 9,609 | 6 | 124 | 48 | 10 | 77/km^{2} (201/sq mi) | 5 |
| 225 | San Lorenzo | 5,903 | 10 | 58.59 | 22.62 | 22 | 101/km^{2} (261/sq mi) | 2 |
| 285 | San Miguel Tlacamama | 3,668 | 17 | 103.7 | 40.0 | 12 | 35/km^{2} (92/sq mi) | 13 |
| 302 | San Pedro Atoyac | 4,559 | 14 | 74.35 | 28.71 | 17 | 61/km^{2} (159/sq mi) | 9 |
| 312 | San Pedro Jicayán | 11,279 | 5 | 85.15 | 32.88 | 15 | 132/km^{2} (343/sq mi) | 1 |
| 345 | San Sebastián Ixcapa | 4,188 | 15 | 98.28 | 37.95 | 13 | 43/km^{2} (110/sq mi) | 12 |
| 367 | Santa Catarina Mechoacán | 4,582 | 13 | 51.21 | 19.77 | 24 | 89/km^{2} (232/sq mi) | 4 |
| 402 | Santa María Cortijo | 1,067 | 23 | 81.33 | 31.40 | 16 | 13/km^{2} (34/sq mi) | 24 |
| 414 | Santa María Huazolotitlán | 11,995 | 4 | 275.3 | 106.3 | 5 | 44/km^{2} (113/sq mi) | 11 |
| 466 | Santiago Ixtayutla | 13,880 | 3 | 456.1 | 176.1 | 3 | 30/km^{2} (79/sq mi) | 16 |
| 467 | Santiago Jamiltepec | 19,112 | 2 | 637.9 | 246.3 | 2 | 30/km^{2} (78/sq mi) | 17 |
| 474 | Santiago Llano Grande | 3,440 | 18 | 110.4 | 42.6 | 11 | 31/km^{2} (81/sq mi) | 15 |
| 482 | Santiago Pinotepa Nacional | 55,840 | 1 | 804.5 | 310.6 | 1 | 69/km^{2} (180/sq mi) | 8 |
| 485 | Santiago Tapextla | 3,134 | 20 | 128.8 | 49.7 | 9 | 24/km^{2} (63/sq mi) | 20 |
| 489 | Santiago Tetepec | 4,909 | 11 | 290.9 | 112.3 | 4 | 17/km^{2} (44/sq mi) | 22 |
| 507 | Santo Domingo Armenta | 3,155 | 19 | 143.7 | 55.5 | 8 | 22/km^{2} (57/sq mi) | 21 |
| | Distrito Jamiltepec | 195,673 | — | 2,981 | 1,659.47 | — | 46/km^{2} (118/sq mi) | — |
Source: INEGI

=== Largest cities ===
Largest cities or towns in Jamiltepec Distric Source:
| Rank | | Municipality | Pop. |
|---|---|---|---|
| 1 | Santiago Pinotepa Nacional | Santiago Pinotepa Nacional | 33,276 |
| 2 | Santiago Jamiltepec | Santiago Jamiltepec | 10,387 |
| 3 | San Juan Colorado | San Juan Colorado | 5,679 |
| 4 | Pinotepa de Don Luis | Pinotepa de Don Luis | 5,471 |
| 5 | Santa María Huazolotitlán | Santa María Huazolotitlán | 5,165 |
| 6 | San Andrés Huaxpaltepec | San Andrés Huaxpaltepec | 4,590 |
| 7 | Santa Catarina Mechoacán | Santa Catarina Mechoacán | 4,526 |
| 8 | San Pedro Jicayán | San Pedro Jicayán | 4,386 |
| 9 | San Juan Cacahuatepec | San Juan Cacahuatepec | 4,254 |
| 10 | San Antonio Tepetlapa | San Antonio Tepetlapa | 2,900 |

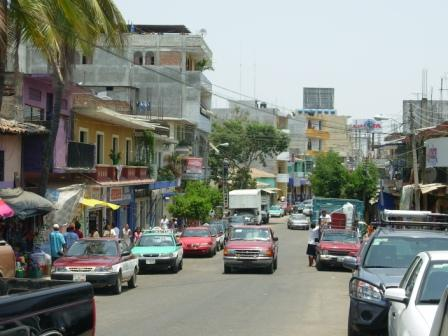
Pinotepa Nacional

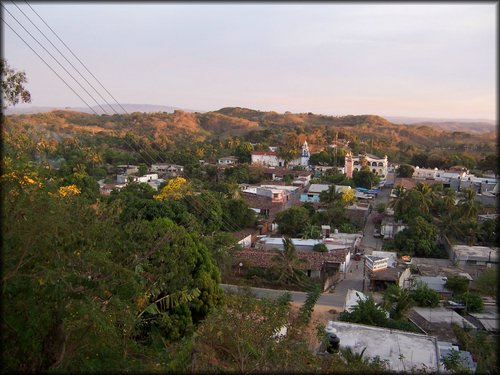
San Juan Cacahuatepec
