= San Sebastián Tecomaxtlahuaca =

San Sebastián Tecomaxtlahuaca (Plains of the Tecomates)
- Municipality and town
- Nickname: Teco
- Motto(s): We are from Oaxaca and proud of it.
- Location in Mexico
- Coordinates: 17°21′N 98°02′W
- Country: Mexico
- State: Oaxaca
- District: Juxtlahuaca District

Area
  - Total: 369.99 km^{2} (142.85 sq mi)

Population (2005)
  - Total: 6,916
- Time zone: UTC-6 (Central Standard Time)

San Sebastián Tecomaxtlahuaca is a town and municipality in Oaxaca in south-western Mexico. The municipality covers an area of 369.99 km^{2} and is part of the Juxtlahuaca District of the Mixteca Region.

As of 2005, the municipality had a total population of 6,916.
