= San Andrés Huaxpaltepec =

- Municipality and town
- Location in Mexico
- Coordinates: 16°20′N 97°55′W
- Country: Mexico
- State: Oaxaca

Area
  - Total: 67.6 km^{2} (26.1 sq mi)

Population (2005)
  - Total: 5,756
- Time zone: UTC-6 (Central Standard Time)

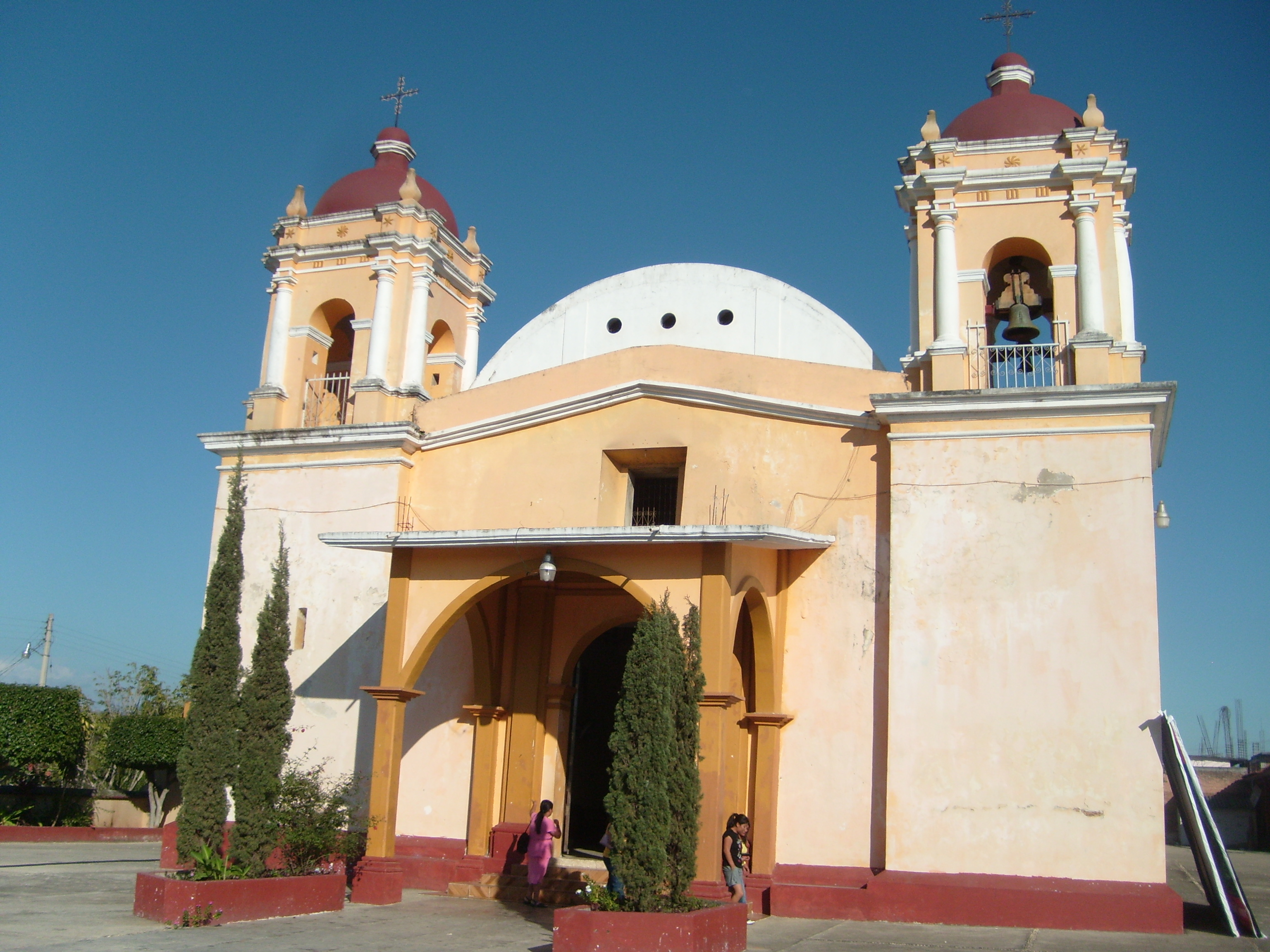
Church of San Andres Huaxpaltepec

San Andrés Huaxpaltepec is a town and municipality in Oaxaca in south-western Mexico. The municipality covers an area of 67.6 km^{2}. It is located in the Jamiltepec District in the west of the Costa Region.

As of 2005, the municipality had a total population of 5,756.
