= La Horqueta =

La Horqueta Paso de la Horqueta
- Populated centre
- Location in Uruguay
- Coordinates: 34°14′16″S 57°52′55″W
- Country: Uruguay
- Department: Colonia Department
- Elevation: 47 m (154 ft)

Population (2011)
  - Total: 100

La Horqueta, also known as Paso de la Horqueta, is a small new populated centre in the Colonia Department of southwestern Uruguay.

== Geography ==
It is located west of Río San Juan and east of Miguelete Creek. Routes 21 and 106 intersect Route 22 in this area east of a bridge over Arroyo Miguelete called Paso del Pelado. 2 kilometres (1.2 mi) north of it, along Route 21, is a bridge over Río San Juan called Paso de la Horqueta, which gives the name to the area. There is an old abandoned church just north of the bridge.

== Information ==
La Horqueta has two primary and secondary schools, one of which is private. Animal husbandry is the main industrial activity of the village, followed closely by agriculture and milk production.

In the Google satellite image of 15 May 2007 there are only fields with no structure of streets, where four blocks of newly built houses appear in the satellite image of 8 October 2009.

== Population ==
La Horqueta appeared first as a populated centre in the 2011 census and had a population of 100.

Year	Population
2011	100

== Organizations named after this area ==
There is an athletic club based in Tarariras called Club La Horqueta Wánderers, which has a football team, the Horqueta Wánderers F.C. and a racing car track called Autódromo Pilón Banchero or Autodromo Juan A. Schnyder.
