= Buctzotz =

Town in the Mexican state of Yucatán

- Municipal Seat
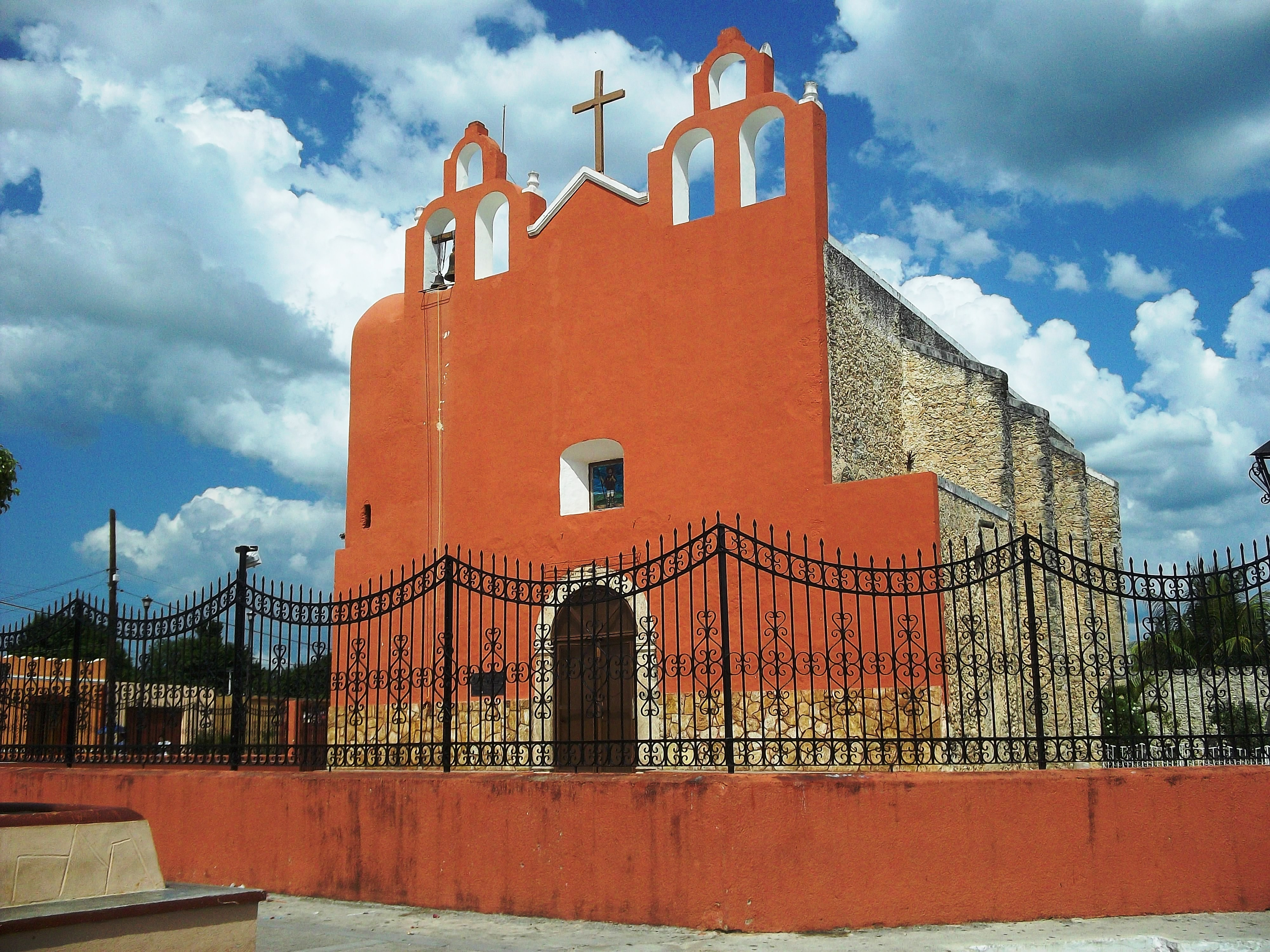
- Church of Buctzotz

- Location within Yucatán (state)
- Coordinates: 21°12′06″N 88°47′34″W
- Country: Mexico
- State: Yucatán
- Municipality: Buctzotz

Government
  - Mayor: José Reyes Santos Aguilar
- Elevation: 7 m (23 ft)

Population (2010)
  - Total: 7,515
- Time zone: UTC-6 (Central Standard Time)
- Postal code (of seat): 97620
- Area code: 991
- INEGI code: 310060001

Buctzotz is a town and the municipal seat of the Buctzotz Municipality, Yucatán in Mexico. As of 2010, the town has a population of 7,515.

== Demographics ==
Historical population

| Year | Pop. | ±% |
|---|---|---|
| 1900 | 553 | — |
| 1910 | 523 | −5.4% |
| 1921 | 823 | +57.4% |
| 1930 | 908 | +10.3% |
| 1940 | 1,401 | +54.3% |
| 1950 | 1,895 | +35.3% |
| 1960 | 2,973 | +56.9% |

| Year | Pop. | ±% |
|---|---|---|
| 1970 | 3,853 | +29.6% |
| 1980 | 4,322 | +12.2% |
| 1990 | 5,817 | +34.6% |
| 1995 | 4,322 | −25.7% |
| 2000 | 6,741 | +56.0% |
| 2005 | 7,229 | +7.2% |
| 2010 | 7,515 | +4.0% |
