= Dzoncauich =

- Municipal Seat
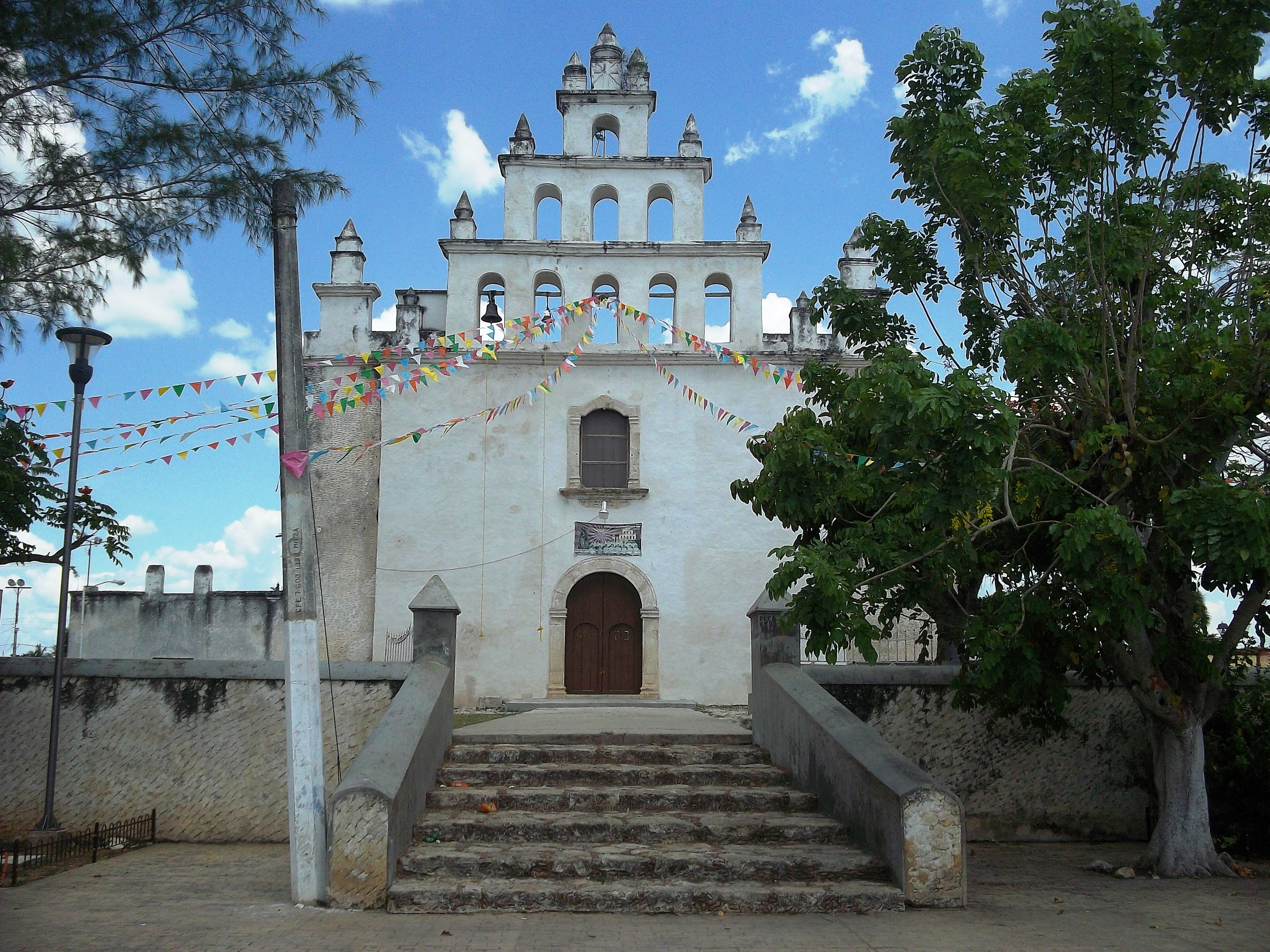
- Main church of Dzoncauich.

- Location within Yucatán (state)
- Coordinates: 21°07′40″N 88°53′26″W
- Country: Mexico
- State: Yucatán
- Municipality: Dzoncauich
- Elevation: 7 m (23 ft)

Population (2010)
  - Total: 2,318
- Time zone: UTC-6 (Central Standard Time)
- Postal code (of seat): 97646
- Area code: 991
- INEGI code: 310310001
- Demonym: Dzoncauicheño

Dzoncauich is a town and the municipal seat of the Dzoncauich Municipality, Yucatán in Mexico. As of 2010, the town has a population of 2,318.

== Demographics ==
Historical population

Year	Pop.	±%
1900	332	—
1910	315	−5.1%
1921	549	+74.3%
1930	659	+20.0%
1940	1,028	+56.0%
1950	963	−6.3%
1960	1,463	+51.9%

Year	Pop.	±%
1970	1,793	+22.6%
1980	2,422	+35.1%
1990	2,189	−9.6%
1995	2,380	+8.7%
2000	2,291	−3.7%
2005	2,323	+1.4%
