= Santos Reyes Tepejillo =

Coordinates: 17°26′N 97°56′W

- Municipality and town
- Interactive map of Santos Reyes Tepejillo
- Country: Mexico
- State: Oaxaca
- Time zone: UTC-6 (Central Standard Time)

Santos Reyes Tepejillo is a town and municipality in Oaxaca in south-western Mexico. The municipality covers an area of km^{2} and is part of the Juxtlahuaca District of the Mixteca Region.

As of 2005, the municipality had a total population of .

Aparicio Reyes, municipal president, became the 14th municipal president of Oaxaca to die of COVID-19 on January 31, 2021. As of February 18, there were seven confirmed cases and one death in the municipality due to the pandemic.
