= Macultepec =

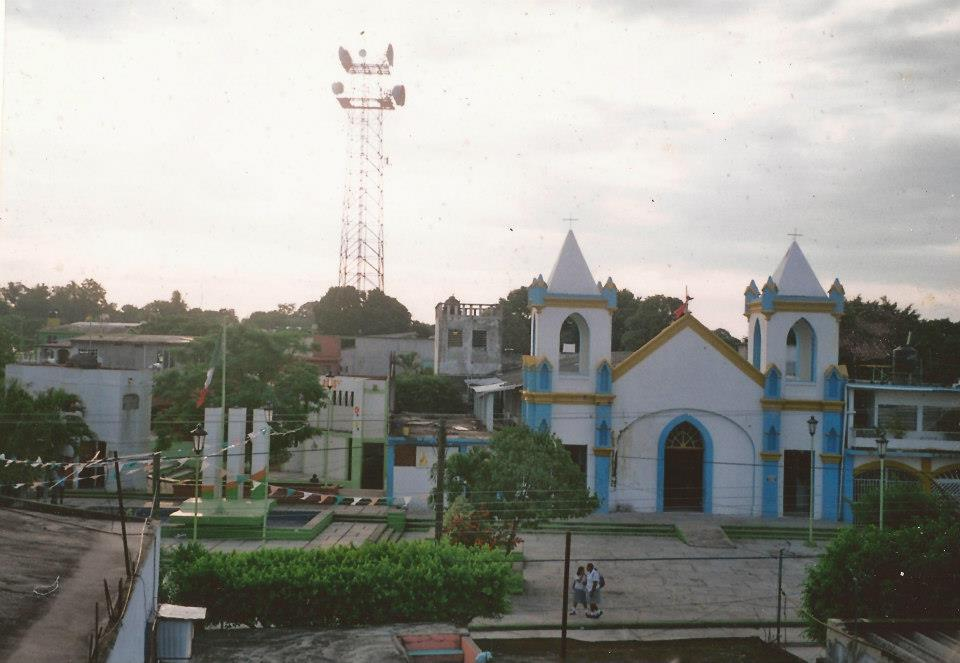
- Interactive map of Macultepec
- Coordinates: 18°09′N 92°53′W
- Country: Mexico
- State: Tabasco
- Municipality: Centro
- Founded: 1744

Government
  - Municipal delegate: Benito Ortiz (PRI)
- Elevation: 10 m (33 ft)

Population (2005 census)
  - Total: 6 624
- Time zone: Central Standard Time
- Postal code: 86250

Macultepec is a village of the Centro municipality, in the Mexican state of Tabasco. The etymology of Macultepec's name comes from the Chontal Macuiltepeque, meaning "on five hills".

It is one of seven villages of the Centro municipality and one of 13 Regional Development Centers (DCR) that develop the majority of the economic and social activities of the municipality.

Founded officially in 1744 by the Spaniard Ignacio Isidro de Avalos, employee of the Pardos Company.
