= Mártires de Tacubaya =

- Municipality and town
- Location in Mexico
- Coordinates: 16°32′N 98°15′W
- Country: Mexico
- State: Oaxaca

Area
  - Total: 89.3 km^{2} (34.5 sq mi)

Population (2005)
  - Total: 1,189
- Time zone: UTC-6 (Central Standard Time)

Mártires de Tacubaya is a town and municipality in Oaxaca in south-western Mexico. The municipality covers an area of 89.3 km^{2}. It is located in the Jamiltepec District in the west of the Costa Region.

As of 2005, the municipality had a total population of 1,189.
