= El Carrizo =

El Carrizo Miguel Alemán
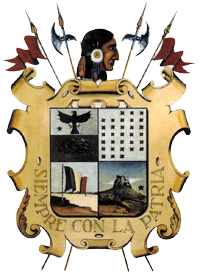
- Seal

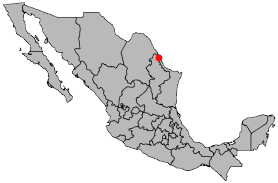

- Location within Tamaulipas Location within Mexico
- Coordinates: 27.3710°N 99.3728°W
- Country: Mexico
- State: Tamaulipas
- Municipality: Nuevo Laredo
- Elevation: 136 m (446 ft)

Population (2010)
  - Total: 114
- Time zone: UTC-6 (CST)
  - Summer (DST): UTC-5 (CDT)
- Codigo Postal: 88000
- Area code: +52-867
- Nearest Airports: Laredo: Laredo International Airport KLRD LRD Nuevo Laredo: Quetzalcoatl International Airport MMNL NLD

El Carrizo is a town located in Nuevo Laredo Municipality in the Mexican state of Tamaulipas. According to the INEGI Census of 2010, Miguel Alemán had a population of 114 inhabitants. Its elevation is 136 meters above sea level.
