= Kantunil Municipality =

Municipality in the Mexican state of Yucatán

Kantunil
- Municipality
- Region 3 Centro #042

- Location of the Municipality in Mexico
- Coordinates: 20°47′45″N 89°02′05″W
- Country: Mexico
- State: Yucatán

Government
  - Type: 2012–2015
  - Municipal President: Felipe Pech Padilla

Area
  - Total: 153.29 km^{2} (59.19 sq mi)
- Elevation: 16 m (52 ft)

Population (2010)
  - Total: 5,502
- Time zone: UTC-6 (Central Standard Time)
- INEGI Code: 009
- Major Airport: Merida (Manuel Crescencio Rejón) International Airport
- IATA Code: MID
- ICAO Code: MMMD

Kantunil Municipality (In the Yucatec Maya Language: “place of yellow or precious stone”) is a municipality in the Mexican state of Yucatán containing 153.29 km^{2} of land and located roughly 65 km southeast of the city of Mérida.

== History ==
There are no records indicating the history of pre-Hispanic times for this area. After the conquest the area became part of the encomienda system. The known encomenderos for Kantunil are: Juan de Aguilar (1549)l Francisco López de Cieza (1552), Diego López de Cieza (1607), Pedro de Magaña Pacheco de la Cámara (1632), Pedro de Magaña y Contreras, José de Arrúe (1648), Alonso Chacón de Aguilar (1664-1688), Ignacio Chacón.

Yucatán declared its independence from the Spanish Crown in 1821 and in 1825, the area was assigned to the Coast region with its headquarters in Izamal Municipality. In 1910, Kantunil and Holcá were the only settlements in the area.

== Governance ==
The municipal president is elected for a three year term. The town council has four aldermen, who serve as Secretary of the Town Hall; and councilors of heritage and patrimony; parks, public gardens and cemeteries; and public lighting.

The Municipal Council administers the business of the municipality. It is responsible for budgeting and expenditures and producing all required reports for all branches of the municipal administration. Annually it determines educational standards for schools.

The Police Commissioners ensure public order and safety. They are tasked with enforcing regulations, distributing materials and administering rulings of general compliance issued by the council.

== Communities ==
The head of the municipality is Kantunil, Yucatán. The other populated areas in the municipality are Guadalupe, Holcá, San Adrián, San Diego, San Dimas, San Felipe, San Pedro, Santa María, and Sualahtún. The significant populations are shown below:

Community	Population
Entire Municipality (2010)	5,502
Holcá	1916 in 2005
Kantunil	3428 in 2005

== Local festivals ==
Every year from 31 January to 4 February 4, is held a celebration in of the Virgin of Candelaria.

== Tourist attractions ==
- Church of the Virgin of Candelaria, built in the seventeenth century
- archaeological site at Coloba
- Cenote Chihuan
