= Cenotillo =

Town in the Mexican state of Yucatán

- Municipal Seat
- Location within Yucatán (state)
- Coordinates: 20°57′56″N 88°36′09″W
- Country: Mexico
- State: Yucatán
- Municipality: Cenotillo

Government
  - Mayor: Domingo Navarrete Medina
- Elevation: 26 m (85 ft)

Population (2010)
  - Total: 3,272
- Time zone: UTC-6 (Central Standard Time)
- Postal code (of seat): 92586
- Area code: 991
- INEGI code: 310120001

Cenotillo is a town and the municipal seat of the Cenotillo Municipality, Yucatán in Mexico. As of 2010, the town has a population of 3,272.
