= Seybaplaya =

City in the Mexican state of Campeche

- Location within Campeche Location within Mexico
- Coordinates: 19°38′22″N 90°41′18″W
- Country: Mexico
- State: Campeche
- Municipality: Seybaplaya
- Elevation: 4 m (13 ft)

Population (2020)
  - Total: 9,515
- Time zone: UTC−6 (Central (US Central))
- Postal code: 24460
- Area code: 982

Seybaplaya is a city in the Mexican state of Campeche. It is located in the north of the state, 30 km from the state capital Campeche, Camp. It serves as the municipal seat of the municipality of the same name.

The population settles in the northern portion of the small bay bounded to the south by Punta Sihoplaya and to the north by Punta Seybaplaya. Further north, about 3 km, Punta del Morro can be found.

As of 2020, the city of Tenabo had a population of 9,515.

== Point ==
In the Yucatán Peninsula, the term Punta is used to designate the formations related to the configuration of the coast. Due to its morphology, it is possible to distinguish two types of points: the ends of the coastal cord that indicate the entrances of the sea towards the estuaries and, on the other hand, the projections of land towards the sea, whether sandy or stony, and that mark a change of direction in the outline of the coastline.
