= San Miguel del Valle =

Coordinates: 42°02′N 5°29′W

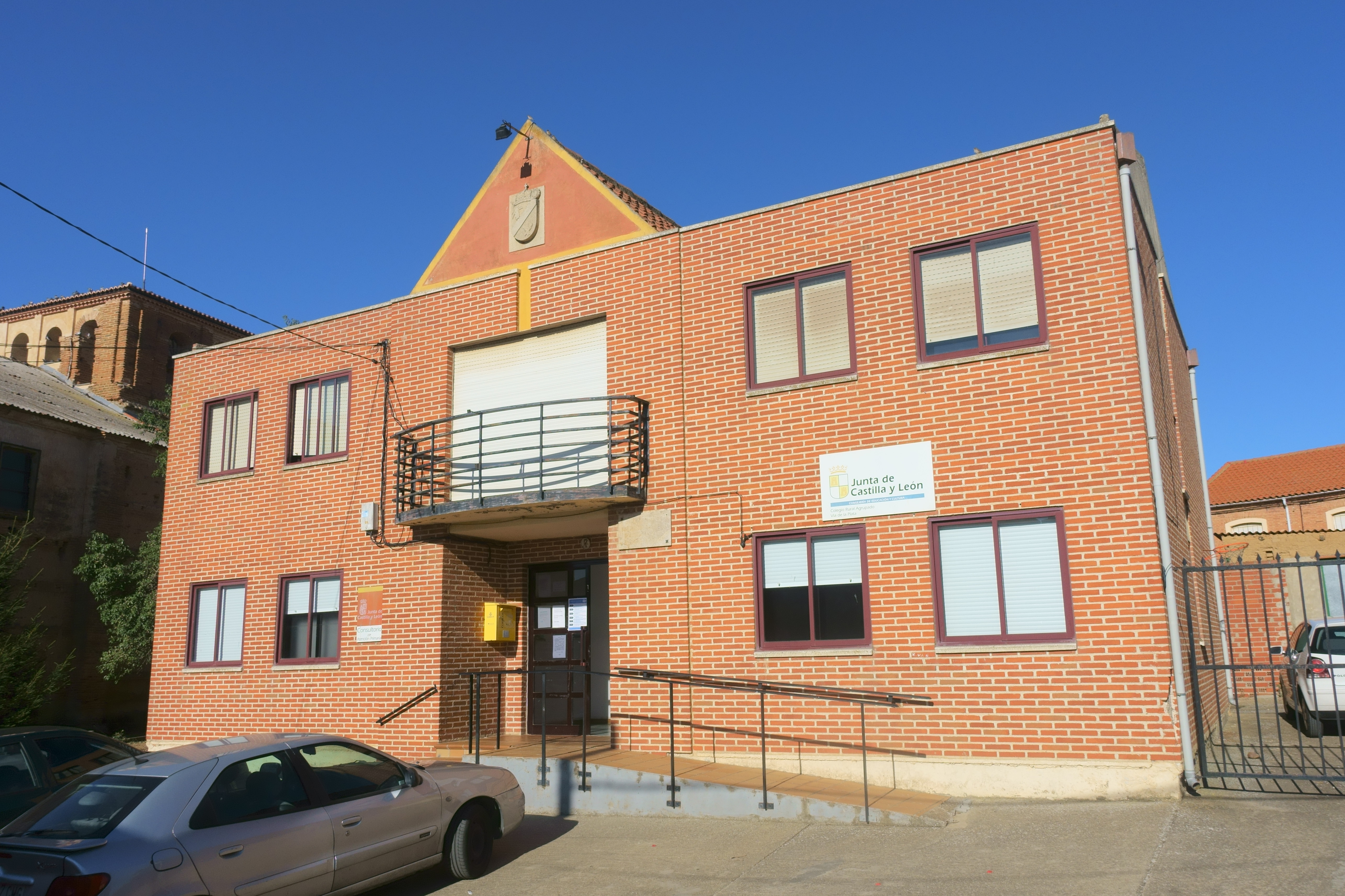

- Flag Coat of arms
- Interactive map of San Miguel del Valle
- Country: Spain
- Autonomous community: Castile and León
- Province: Zamora
- Municipality: San Miguel del Valle

Area
  - Total: 10 km^{2} (3.9 sq mi)

Population (2025-01-01)
  - Total: 123
  - Density: 12/km^{2} (32/sq mi)
- Time zone: UTC+1 (CET)
  - Summer (DST): UTC+2 (CEST)
- Website: Official website

San Miguel del Valle is a municipality located in the province of Zamora, Castile and León, Spain. According to the 2004 census (INE), the municipality has a population of 214 inhabitants.
