= Collantes =

Collantes is a Spanish surname. Notable people with the surname include:

- Florentino Collantes (1896–1951), Filipino poet
- Francisco Collantes (1599–1656), Spanish Baroque painter
- Juan José Collantes (born 1983), Spanish footballer
- King Collantes (born 1980), Filipino politician
- Manuel Collantes (died 2009), Filipino diplomat
- Sonny Collantes (born 1952), Filipino politician
