= San José Estancia Grande =

- Municipality and town
- Location in Mexico
- Coordinates: 16°22′N 98°15′W
- Country: Mexico
- State: Oaxaca

Area
  - Total: 103.3 km^{2} (39.9 sq mi)

Population (2005)
  - Total: 955
- Time zone: UTC-6 (Central Standard Time)

San José Estancia Grande is a town and municipality in Oaxaca in south-western Mexico. The municipality covers an area of 103.3 km^{2}. It is located in the Jamiltepec District in the west of the Costa Region.

As of 2005, the municipality had a total population of 955.

Carmela Parral Santos, mayor of San José Estancia Grande, and Hugo Castellanos Ortega, the delegate from the area are murdered in the town of El Faisan on August 16, 2019.
