= Coicoyán de las Flores =

Coicoyan de Las Flores
- Municipality and town
- Interactive map of Coicoyan de Las Flores
- Country: Mexico
- State: Oaxaca

Area
  - Total: 105.89 km^{2} (40.88 sq mi)

Population (2005)
  - Total: 7,598

Coicoyan de Las Flores is a town and municipality in Oaxaca in south-western Mexico. The municipality covers an area of 105.89 square kilometres (40.88 sq mi) and is part of the Juxtlahuaca district of the Mixteca Region. As of 2005, the municipality had a total population of 7,598.

== History ==
The foundation of this town is unknown for certain since there is no written record. Oral stories focus on a hill called El Gachupin. There, a Spanish force threatened general Vicente Guerrero who was in Ahuajutla's ranch helping his troops by using the metals from the mines of carbonera to coin money (from gold, copper and silver). He stayed and waited until the perfect opportunity arrived to attack the Spaniards in Azompa, taking advantage of darkness and letting them to destroy themselves. The next morning when they realized what had happened, they were shocked so the general Vicente Guerrero attacked them again and achieved victory, taking some prisoners with him to Xonacatlan camp where he had some other forces.
