= San Juan Bautista lo de Soto =

- Municipality and town
- Location in Mexico
- Coordinates: 16°30′35″N 96°20′50″W
- Country: Mexico
- State: Oaxaca

Area
  - Total: 63.8 km^{2} (24.6 sq mi)

Population (2005)
  - Total: 2,140
- Time zone: UTC-6 (Central Standard Time)

San Juan Bautista lo de Soto is a town and municipality in Oaxaca in south-western Mexico. The municipality covers an area of 63.8 km^{2}. It is located in the Jamiltepec District in the west of the Costa Region.

As of 2005, the municipality had a total population of 2,140.
