= Santa María Cortijo =

- Municipality and town
- Location in Mexico
- Coordinates: 16°27′N 98°17′W
- Country: Mexico
- State: Oaxaca

Area
  - Total: 88 km^{2} (34 sq mi)

Population (2005)
  - Total: 983
- Time zone: UTC-6 (Central Standard Time)

Santa María Cortijo is a town and municipality in Oaxaca in south-western Mexico. The municipality covers an area of 88 km^{2}. It is located in the Jamiltepec District in the west of the Costa Region.

As of 2005, the municipality had a total population of 983.
