= Santiago Llano Grande =

Coordinates: 16°30′N 98°17′W

- Municipality and town
- Nickname: la banda
- Interactive map of Santiago Llano Grande
- Country: Mexico
- State: Oaxaca

Population (2005)
  - Total: 3,440
- Time zone: UTC-6 (Central Standard Time)

Santiago Llano Grande is a town and municipality in Oaxaca in south-western Mexico. The municipality covers an area of km^{2}. It is located in the Jamiltepec District in the west of the Costa Region.

As of 2005, the municipality had a total population of 3,440.
