= San Martín Peras =

- Municipality and town
- Location in Mexico
- Coordinates: 17°21′N 98°14′W
- Country: Mexico
- State: Oaxaca

Area
  - Total: 237.31 km^{2} (91.63 sq mi)

Population (2005)
  - Total: 12,406
- Time zone: UTC-6 (Central Standard Time)

San Martín Peras is a town and municipality in Oaxaca about 157 mi (252 km) south of Mexico City which is the country's capital city. The municipality covers an area of 237.31km^{2} and is part of the Juxtlahuaca district of the Mixteca Region.

As of 2005, the municipality had a total population of 12,406.

Southern states of Mexico tend to be on the poorer side. In fact, the top three states with the highest poverty rates in Mexico are the ones with the highest indigenous populations. According to WorldAtlas, as of 2018, Oaxaca is said to be Mexico's third poorest state, with a poverty rate of 66.4%.

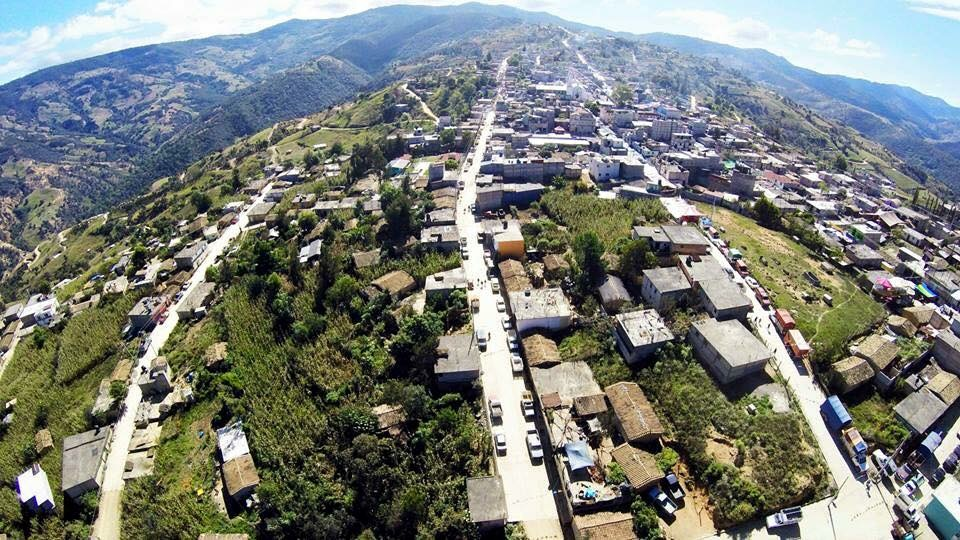
San Martín Peras town

Mixtec has three level tones: high, medium, and low. The indigenous community of San Martín Peras speak Low Mixtec or referred to as "mixteco bajo" in Spanish. Their traditional food is mole rojo. There are many ways in which this dish is made but one thing that is similar among all is that it takes a long time to make, a process that can take up to days to make. The most common form of music they listen to is Chilenas. There are many artists in this town, one of the most well known is Regino Aguilar Y Su Teclado Digital.

== Customs and habits ==
Many members of the community who leave San Martín Peras do not leave forever. This is due to a traditional indigenous law called "Usos Y Costumbres" in which all indigenous families have to comply with. Some are obligated to take a role in the community such as a mayor or policeman. Males can begin this service as young as 14, if they are married, if not, the age minimum is 15 and to end the age is 70. Women who are single or are widows can give their services as well. Once one has done their services they are left alone for about 5 years until citizens vote them into the ballot. If one fails to give their services they risk heavy fines or even worse, they lose their ancestral land.
