= San Antonio Tepetlapa =

- Municipality and town
- Location in Mexico
- Coordinates: 16°32′N 98°04′W
- Country: Mexico
- State: Oaxaca

Area
  - Total: 65.07 km^{2} (25.12 sq mi)

Population (2005)
  - Total: 3,873
- Time zone: UTC-6 (Central Standard Time)

San Antonio Tepetlapa is a town and municipality in Oaxaca in south-western Mexico. The municipality covers an area of 65.07 km^{2}. It is located in the Jamiltepec District in the west of the Costa Region.

As of 2005, the municipality had a total population of 3,873.
