= San Miguel Tlacotepec =

- Municipality and town
- Location in Mexico
- Coordinates: 17°27′N 98°0′W
- Country: Mexico
- State: Oaxaca

Area
  - Total: 112.27 km^{2} (43.35 sq mi)

Population (2005)
  - Total: 3,307
- Time zone: UTC-6 (Central Standard Time)

San Miguel Tlacotepec is a town and municipality in Oaxaca in south-western Mexico. The municipality covers an area of 112.27 km^{2} and is part of the Juxtlahuaca district of the Mixteca Region.

As of 2005, the municipality had a total population of 3,307.
