= Tekantó Municipality =

Municipality in the Mexican state of Yucatán

Tekantó
- Municipality
- Municipal Building of Tekantó

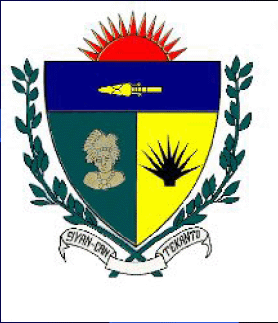
- Coat of arms
- Motto: Siyan Kán Tekantó (Illustrious Tekantó)
- Location of the Tekantó Municipality in Yucatán

- Location of the municipality in Mexico
- Coordinates: 21°01′N 89°06′W
- Country: Mexico
- State: Yucatán
- Mexico Ind.: 1821
- Yucatan Est.: 1824
- Municipality Est.: 1900
- Named for: Place of the yellow flint

Government
  - Type: 2007-2010
  - Municipal President: Fernando Che Canul

Area
  - Total: 47.25 km^{2} (18.24 sq mi)
- Elevation: 10 m (33 ft)

Population (2009)
  - Total: 4,079
  - Density: 86.33/km^{2} (223.6/sq mi)
  - Demonym: Tekantence
- Time zone: UTC-6 (Central Standard Time)
- Postal Codes: Tekanto 97520, Tixkochoh 97522
- Area code: 991
- Population History: by Year: • 2000 3,942; • 2001 3,960; • 2002 3,978; • 2003 3,994; • 2004 4,010; • 2005 4,025; • 2006 4,039; • 2007 4,053; • 2008 4,067
- INEGI Code: 078
- Major Airport: Merida (Manuel Crescencio Rejón) International Airport
- IATA Code: MID
- ICAO Code: MMMD

Tekantó Municipality (In the Yucatec Maya Language: “Place where there is yellow flint”) is a small (47.25 km^{2}) municipality in the Mexican state of Yucatán. The municipality was formed in 1900 and its municipal seat is the homonymous locality of Tekantó, at the end of highway 80, 54 km east of Merida.

A typical shop in Tekantó, these buildings date back to the 1920s

== History ==
- Before the Spanish conquest of Yucatán the region of Tekantó was part of the chieftainship of Ah Kin Chel (1441–1543).
- 1546: The Spanish conquest of Yucatán that started in 1526 is considered complete.
- 1567: Franciscan Mission founded in Tekantó.
- 1581: Cristobal Sanchez inherits both Tekantó and Tepakan under the encomienda system from his father, the famous conquistador Don Diego Sanchez.
- 1688: Construction of the convent and mission of San Augustin Tekantó is completed.
- 1700: Antonia Pacheco and Juan N. Calderón are responsible for Tekantó under the encomienda system.
- 1720: The legality of the Encomienda system is ended and is succeeded by the Hacienda system in which laborers were directly employed by the hacienda owners (Sanlatah is a Hacienda in Tekantó municipality).
- 1821: Yucatán declares itself independent of Spain.
- 1825: During this time Tekantó was in the partido of La Costa, which had Izamal as its capital. (At this time Yucatán was divided up onto 15 partidos or subdelegaciones, and Yucatán then included what is now Campeche).
- 1848: On May 28 during the Caste War of Yucatán after a 6-day siege Colonel Bello led his force of 1,000 men out of Izamal taking a back trail to Tekantó. From Tekantó he watched Izamal burn.
- 1900: Tekantó Municipality is created and Tekantó becomes its own municipality seat.

== Coat of arms ==
In 1990 the Mexican federal government asked all the municipalities to have their own coat of arms. The City council then presided over by C. Manuel González Towers, decided to hold a contest to produce the armorial design. The design was adapted from submissions by several people. Some notable features of the shield are as follows. A sun with 13 rays that indicate the Mayan supraworld. An illustration of the Mayan chief Ah Kin Chel on a green background. Gold background with henequen that has 9 blades, which means the Mayan infraworld, the color gold has economic importance. At either side two branches interlaced by a plant called Kantó and that some say gave rise to the name of the town (this would make the arms "canting"). At the bottom of the shield in front of the branches is a ribbon of silver with the words Siyan Kán Tekantó, this means the illustrious or famous Tekantó.

== Population ==
The population of Tekantó is approximately 4,000. In the year 2000 the census record showed that 1,655 people spoke the indigenous language, Yucatec Maya. This is consistent with the state average which was 30% in 2000.

== Communities ==
The municipality is made up from four principle communities, the municipal seat Tekantó along with its neighboring communities Tixkochoh 21.0138°N 89.0806°W, San Francisco Dzon 20.9835°N 89.1433°W and Sanlatah 21.0426°N 89.1466°W). Their populations are as follows: Tekantó 3224, Tixkochoh 455, San Francisco Dzon 127, Sanlatah 83; the census also included 53 people living outside of these communities, either in isolated rural homes or small communities like the hamlet of San Diego Rodriguez 20.9923°N 89.1143°W. In 2005 there were 942 houses in the municipality.

== Geography ==
Road leading into the Tekantó locality

=== Borders ===
The municipalities that surround Tekantó Municipality are to the north: Suma and Teya, to the south: Izamal, to the east: Tepakán and to the west: Bokobá.

=== Nearby cities ===
The distances from the municipal seat to nearby cities are as follows:

- Izamal, Yucatán · 13 kilometres (8.1 mi) southeast · 14,954 people.
- Motul, Yucatán · 21 kilometres (13 mi) west-northwest · 21,109 people.
- Merida, Yucatán · 54 kilometres (34 mi) west · 717,175 people.

Tekantó's rail station is on the (now disused) rail line that runs between Mérida and Valladolid via Izamal.

=== Climate ===
Warm, with rains during the early summer followed by droughts during the late summer. The annual average temperature is of 26.5 °C and the annual average rainfall is 50 millimeters. The winds are predominantly from the northeast. Relative humidity Annual Average, March 66% - December 89%. The Rainy Season is May through July.

=== Flora and fauna ===
Small portions of non-evergreen low forest with secondary vegetation in the ends northeast and the northwest. Including: poppy, bojom, ceiba, chehem, chichibé, pochote and flamboyán. The common animal species that are found in the area include: rabbit, raccoon, deer, armadillo, various snakes, iguanas and turtles; birds: dove, tzutzuy, quail and tórtola.

== Places of interest and tourism ==
=== Architectural ===
San Augustin Tekantó is an impressive building and one of the largest churches in the Yucatán outside of Merida; it was an important early Franciscan Convent in this region.

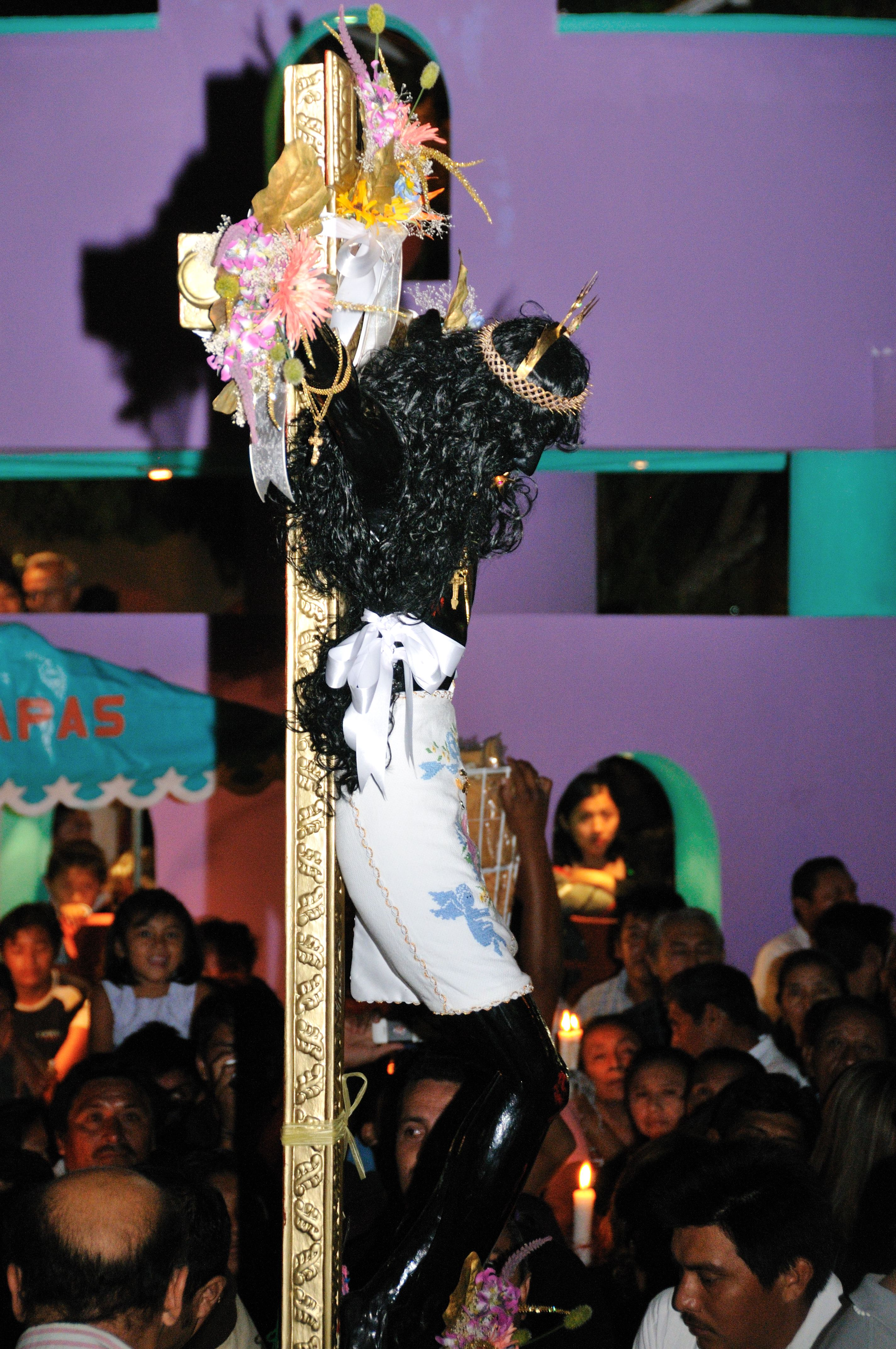
Santo Christo de Citilcún

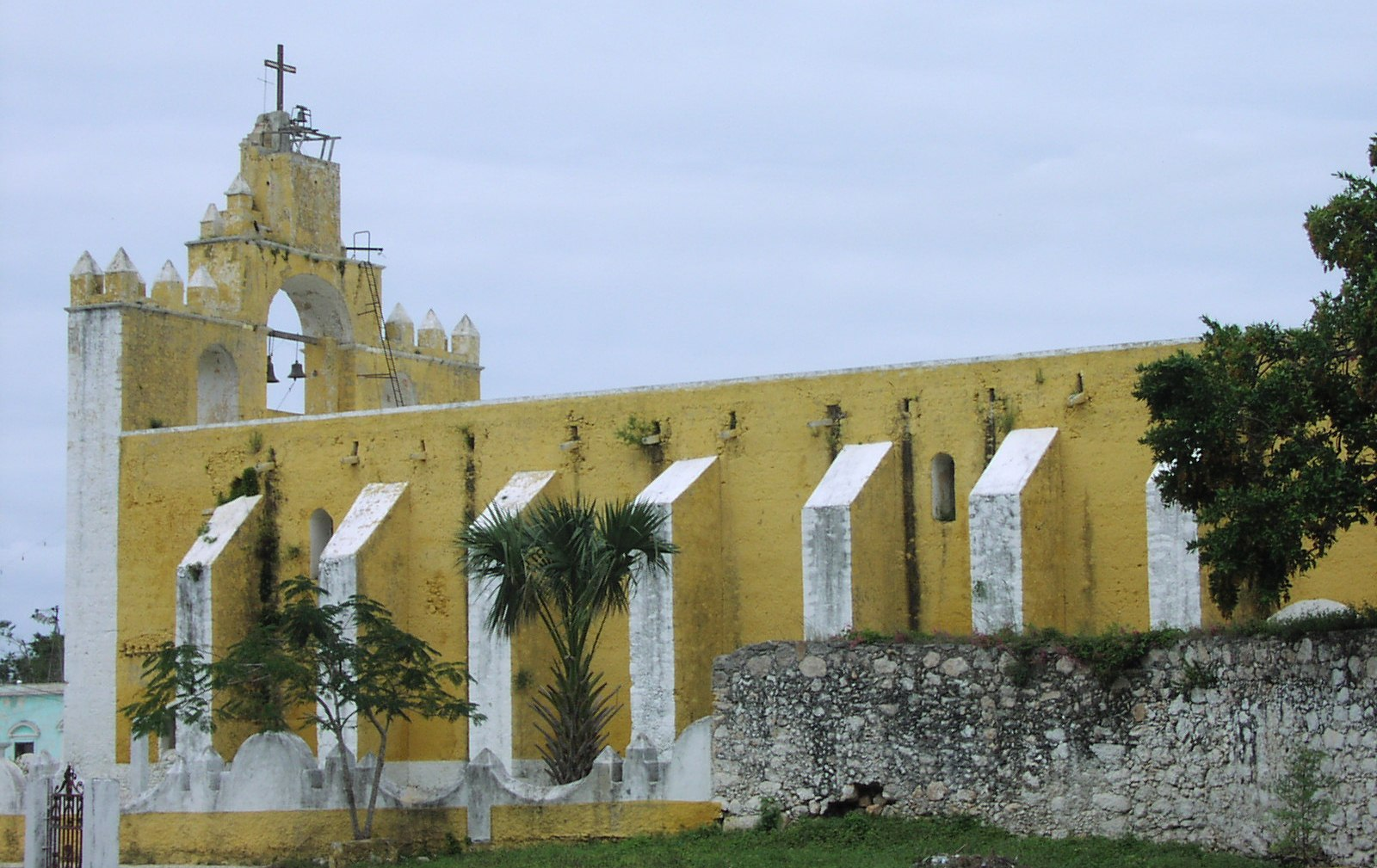
San Augustin Tekantó, as seen from the south

The original mission dates from 1567. According to an inscription on the facade, the church was completed in 1688, over a hundred years after the mission's founding. Near to Tekantó are the hamlets of the ex-properties: Sanlatah and San Francisco Dzon.

=== Popular celebrations ===
From 26 to 28 August an annual fiesta is held in honor of the patron saint of Tekantó, San Augustin.

Between 15 and 26 November, an annual fair is held to celebrate Santo Christo de Citilcún. On November 15 each year a procession brings Santo Christo de Citilcún to Tekantó, after the procession there are firework displays and food for sale in the town square. Towards the end of the month there are various festivities including folk dancing, hosted at the town hall; an impromptu bullfighting ring is set up to host bull fights and other events.

=== Surrounding area ===
The ruins of Ake are 20 km to the south west of the locality of Tekanto, and Izamal with its world-famous monastery, Victorian era carriages, and mesoamerican pyramids is only 13 km to the south east.

== Economy ==
Traditional House in Tekantó

Railway Station in Tekantó

Tekantó is a municipality that is located in the North central zone of Yucatán that is part of the denominated henequen zone, where the main agricultural crop is agave. Along with the surrounding municipalities the major productive activity for many years, until the end of the 20th Century, was the henequen industry.

With the decline of the henequen industry, a process of economic diversification occurred in Tekantó. Today in this area maize is main crop, along with kidney beans, various vegetables, watermelon and some varieties of chili peppers. In addition to these crops, pigs and poultry are farmed. Beekeeping is also common in the area.

== Education ==
Number of schools by educative level, to the year 2000, according to the Statistical Yearbook of the State of Yucatán, published by the INEGI:

Guillermo Prieto School

Name of School	Locality	Level	Student population
FRANCISCO I. MADERO	Tekantó	Pre-school	89
PREESCOLAR COMUNITARIO	San Francisco Dzon	Pre-school	6
SAYABI HA	Tixkochoh	Pre-school	21
ANDRES QUINTANA ROO	Tekantó	Primary	164
GUILLERMO PRIETO	Tekantó	Primary	247
PRIMARIA COMUNITARIA	San Francisco Dzon	Primary	27
PIPILA	Tixkochoh	Primary	47
GUILLERMO PRIETO	Tekantó	Secondary	223

== Notable people ==
Notable locals include Marrufo Cetina, Carlos Anastasio. Mandolinista and musical composer (1875–1932).

== Gallery ==
The clock over San Augustin Tekantó.

San Augustin Tekantó's Franciscan Bell.

San Augustin Tekantó's American Bell.

Local people in traditional dress.

Downtown Tekantó.

A nicer home in Tekantó.

A typical rural street.

A Well at the edge of town.

A traditional Cottage.

The Zócalo (Main Plaza).

== See also ==
- Municipalities of Yucatán.

== Notes ==
Spelling of Mayan Names:

The spelling of Mayan names (family names, place names and others) will often vary from document to document, for this page the spellings used on the municipality web site have been adopted as the standard. Another recommended standard for place names is the SCT (Secretaria de Comunicaciones y Transportes) spelling, as this would then match any road signs. As there are more references to the municipality web site, the SCT spellings are not used throughout the page, but included below for reference.

San Francisco Dzon is also known as San Francisco Tzon (INEGI) and San Francisco Izun (SCT)

Sanlatah is also known as Sanlatá (SCT).
