= Izamal Municipality =

Municipality in the Mexican state of Yucatán

Izamal
- Municipality
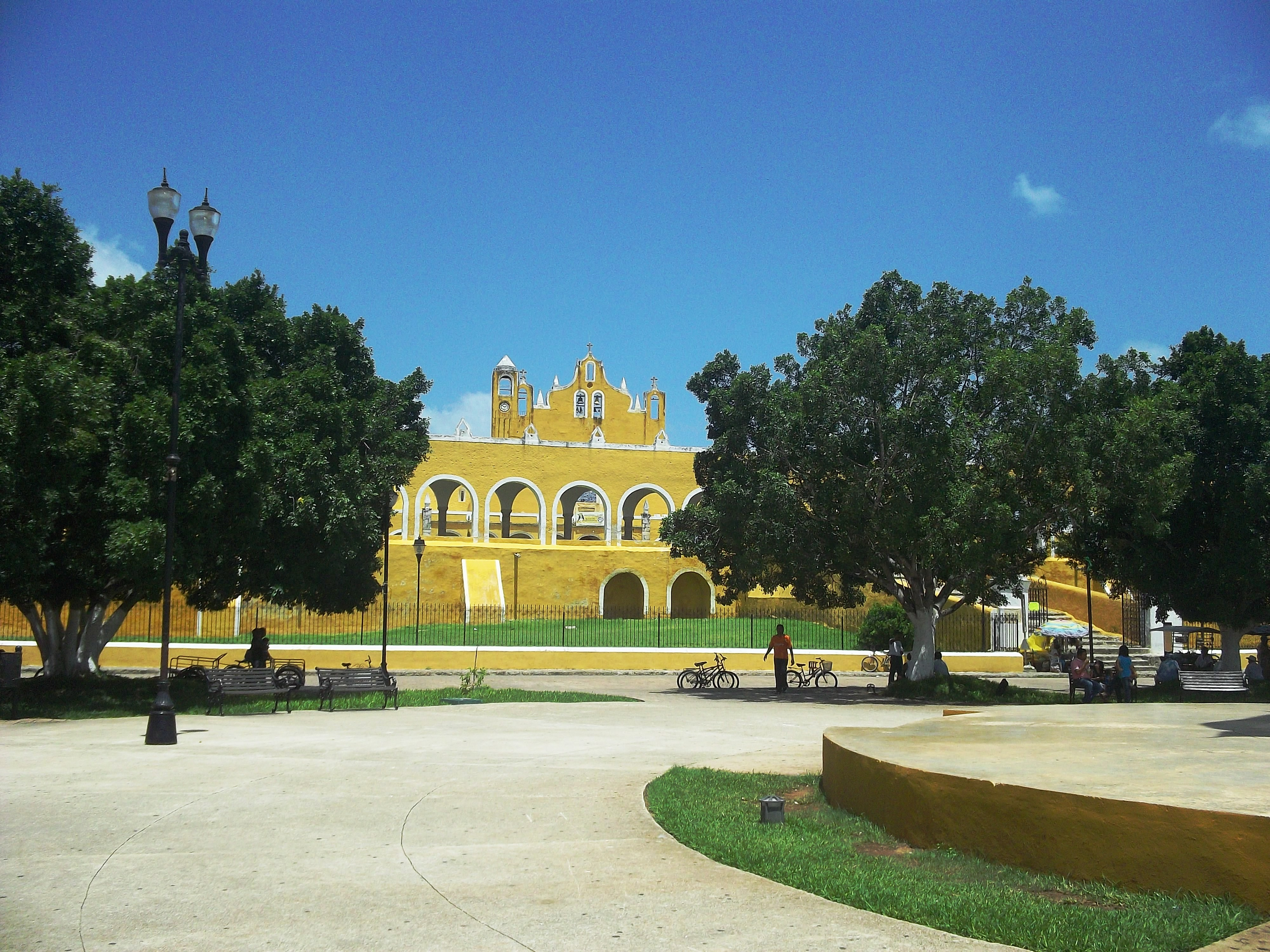
- Convent of San Antonio de Padua at Izamal, Yucatán

- Coat of arms

- Region 3 Centro #035

- Location of the Municipality in Mexico
- Coordinates: 20°55′53″N 89°01′04″W
- Country: Mexico
- State: Yucatán

Government
  - Type: 2012–2015
  - Municipal President: Fermín Humberto Sosa Lugo

Area
  - Total: 275.92 km^{2} (106.53 sq mi)
- Elevation: 13 m (43 ft)

Population (2010)
  - Total: 25,980
- Time zone: UTC-6 (Central Standard Time)
- INEGI Code: 009
- Major Airport: Merida (Manuel Crescencio Rejón) International Airport
- IATA Code: MID
- ICAO Code: MMMD

Izamal Municipality (In the Yucatec Maya Language: “dew of heaven”) is a municipality in the Mexican state of Yucatán containing 275.92 km^{2} of land and located roughly 67 km east of the city of Mérida.

== History ==
Izamal is believed to have been founded in the late Pre-classic period (750 to 200 A.C.), by Zamná, priest of the god Itzamná. Most of the construction on the site dates to the Proto-classic period (200 B.C. to 200 a.c.), the Early Classic (200 to 600 A.C.) And Late Classic (600 to 800 A.C.) periods. When Chichen Itzá rose, during the Final Classic period (800 to 1000 A.C.), Izamal was partially abandoned.

After the conquest the area became part of the encomienda system, which was implemented between 1543 and 1549. Construction of the convent of San Antonio de Padua began in 1553 by fray Diego de Landa, who later instituted an inquisition called the auto de fé against the Maya at Maní and burned the Maya codices. Landa and the encomendero, Francisco Hernández, engaged in a three-year legal battle beginning in 1556 to determine if the church, or the Spanish authorities had jurisdiction of the area. Hernández finally broke under the strain, agreed to submit to Landa's authority, and died shortly after his release from prison in 1561, the same year work on the convent was completed. Juan Cueva Santillán was the encomendero at Izamal in 1577 and filed a report on his duties there in 1581.

Yucatán declared its independence from the Spanish Crown in 1821 and on 25 October 1823, Izamal acquired the status of village and was made headquarters of the Coastal Region. In 1841, it was elevated to the status of city. During the land redistribution policies of the early 20th century, Izamal was declared a pueblo on 13 August 1923, but regained its status as a city in 1981.

== Governance ==
The municipal president is elected for a three-year term. The town council has nine councilpersons, who serve as Secretary of Culture; Public Services; communities; special events; sports; artisans; decorations; ecology and disability services.

The Municipal Council administers the business of the municipality. It is responsible for budgeting and expenditures and producing all required reports for all branches of the municipal administration. Annually it determines educational standards for schools.

The Police Commissioners ensure public order and safety. They are tasked with enforcing regulations, distributing materials and administering rulings of general compliance issued by the council.

== Communities ==
The head of the municipality is Izamal, Yucatán. There are thirty communities in the municipality. The most important are Citilcum, Kimbilá, Sitilpech and Xanabá. Other minor population centers are Balantún, Becal, Catzín, Chan-Kin, Chichihuá, Chichi-Uh, Chixé, Choyoh, Chumul, Cuauhtémoc, Ebulá, Kanan, Kantoyehen, Kauán, Mulsay, Sacalá, Sacnicté, Hacienda Sac-Nicté, Sahaltún, San José Tzucacab, San Luis, San Pedro, Santa María, Tebic, finca Tecoh, Tziló, Tulinche, X'Tohil and Yokdzonot. The significant populations are shown below:

Community	Population
Entire Municipality (2010)	25,980
Citilcum	2015 in 2005
Izamal	15101 in 2005
Kimbilá	3531 in 2005
Sitilpech	1781 in 2005
Xanabá	1305 in 2005

== Local festivals ==
Every year on 3 April is a fiesta for San Ildefonso; from 15 to 25 August, the celebration of the town's patron saint, Our Lady of Izamal is held; from 19 to 28 October processions, gatherings and local folk dances are held in honor of the Santo Cristo de Citilpech; and from 1 to 12 December the Immaculate Conception is celebrated.

Kots Kaal Pato (English: Strangle the Duck) is a controversial event practiced among some Mayan youth in the village of Citilcum. In the event, ducks, bound to high wooden crossbeams by their feet, are mutilated in a ceremony-like atmosphere. It has attracted condemnation from animal rights activists in the region, with several Mexican environmental authorities filing an animal cruelty complaint in regards to the practice.

== Notable people ==
- Zamná, founder of the city
- Crescencio Carrillo y Ancona, (1837-1897) Catholic priest and historian of the Maya

== Tourist attractions ==
- Convent of San Antonio de Padua
- Church of the Virgin of the Candelaria
- Church of St. Joseph
- archaeological sites at Izamal
- Hacienda Sac-Nicte
- Hacienda San Antonio Chalante
- Hacienda Santo Domingo
- Hacienda Tebec de los Reyes
