= Triqui =

Indigenous people of Oaxaca, Mexico

Trique people
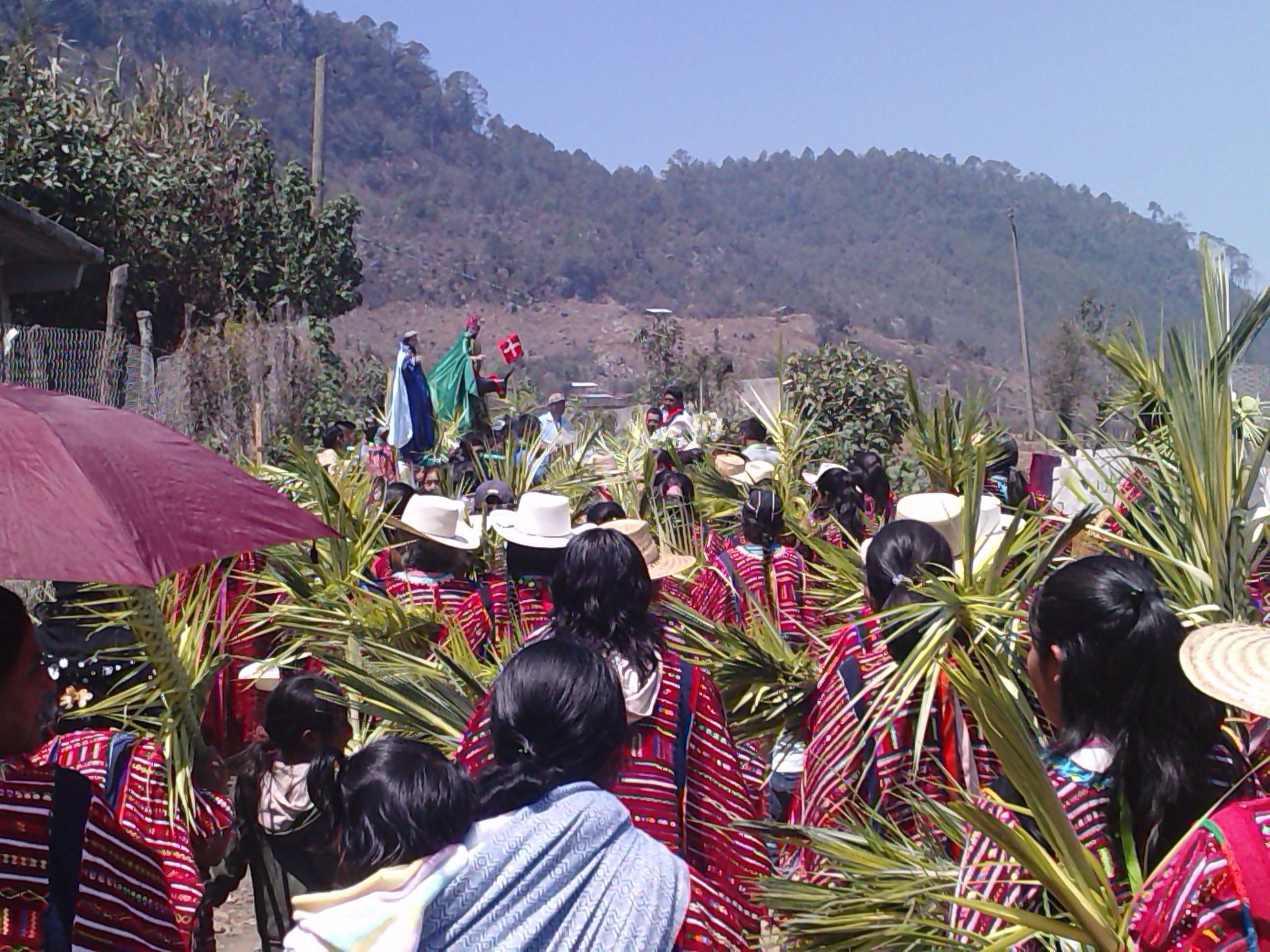
- Trique people during a Palm Sunday procession

Total population
- 25,883

Languages
- Trique, Mixtec, and Mexican Spanish

Religion
- Catholic, Protestant, and Native Trique religion

Related ethnic groups
- Mixtec people and Cuicatec people

A Triqui needlepoint design

The Triqui (Zapotec pronunciation: [triki], Spanish: [ˈtɾiki]) or Trique (Spanish: [ˈtɾike]) are an Indigenous people of the western part of the Mexican state of Oaxaca, centered in the municipalities of Juxtlahuaca, Putla, and Tlaxiaco. They number around 25,883 in 2010. The Triqui language is a Mixtecan language belonging to the Oto-Manguean language family.

Trique peoples are known for their distinctive woven huipiles, baskets, and morrales (handbags).

Triqui people live in a mountainous region, La Mixteca Baja, in southwestern Oaxaca. The elevation within the Triqui region varies between 1,500–3,000 m (4,900–9,800 ft). This high elevation permits low-lying cumulus clouds to envelop entire towns during the afternoons and evenings.

Like many other southern Mexicans, many Triqui men travel to Oaxaca City, Mexico City, or the United States as day laborers or migrant workers. As the average daily salary of a rural Oaxacan is less than $5 (U.S.) and La Mixteca is the poorest region of Oaxaca, migration and remittances sent back to Oaxaca help both migrant Triquis and their families in Oaxaca. Triqui women are more likely to remain in the Triqui region and do not travel as often as Triqui men do.

== Customs ==
One of the notable customs of Triqui people is the practice of bride price. During pre-colonial and colonial times, this was a common practice amongst Indigenous peoples in Mesoamerica, other groups like the Mixtecs of Oaxaca continue practicing a bride price–based marriage. It is typical in Trique culture for a man to offer a bride's family money, food, and other products in exchange for the bride's hand in marriage. Generally, the husband and wife know each other prior to this arrangement, and there is no arrangement without consent. Those opposed to this custom argue that it appears to them to be like slavery or prostitution. Those opposed to intervening in this custom argue that consent is required and that this Triqui custom is not conceived of as immoral.

== Agriculture ==
The Triqui economic income comes through the cultivation of various crops such as corn, beans, pumpkin, chili peppers, quelite, and lima beans among others. But the most important crops are bananas and coffee beans. The products are sold in tianguis (open-air markets) found in Chicahuaztla, Copala, San Martín, Itunyoso, Tlaxiaco, Putla, and Juxtlahuaca.

The Triquis practice slash-and-burn farming. This work is done by various families (between 20 to 30 people) in order to plant milpa (collectively held cornfields) throughout large terrains. This type of collaborate work is known as «mipa colectiva» or «milpa en compañía».

Some Triqui families raise cattle, bovines, sheep, goats, pigs, or horses. On a smaller scale, Triqui also raise chicken, turkey and duck. In the lower lands, they also practice beekeeping.

== Territory ==
- Santiago Juxtlahuaca Municipality (settlements of Agua Fría, Agua Fría Copala, Cerro Barrancadero, Cerro Cabeza, Cerro del Pájaro (Cerro Pájaro), Cerro Plato, Cerro Viejo (Pino Suárez), Cieneguilla, Concepción Carrizal, Coyuchi (Cuyuchi), Cruz Chiquita, Cruz Lengua, Diamante Copala, El Rastrojo, Joya de Anillo, Joya del Mamey Copala, Joya Sabana, La Brama Paraje Pérez (Paraje Pérez), La Cumbre Yerba Santa, La Ladera, La Sabana, Lázaro Cárdenas Copala, Loma Larga, Llano de Aguacate, Llano de Juárez Copala, Llano de Nopal, Llano de Piedra, Ojo de Agua Copala, Paso de Águila Copala (Paso de Águila), Río Humo, Río Lagarto, Río Metates [Río Metate], Río Santiago, Río Tejón, San Jorge Río Frijol, San Juan Copala, San Miguel Copala, San Miguel de Cárdenas, Santa Cruz Tilapa, Santa María Asunción, Santiago Juxtlahuaca, Santiago Naranjos, Tacuya, Tierra Blanca, Tilapa (Guadalupe de Tilapa) [Guadalupe Tilapa], Unidad Habitacional Noventa y Cinco, Unión de Cárdenas, Unión de los Ángeles, Yosoyuxi Copala (Yosoyuxi), and Yutazani)
- San Martín Itunyoso Municipality (settlements of Casa de Zorro, La Concepción, Loma Buenos Aires, Llano Yojosinta, San José Xochixtlán, and San Martín Itunyoso)
- Putla Villa de Guerrero Municipality (settlements of Barranca del Cuche, Concepción del Progreso (La Hacienda), Chapultepec, Charloco, Chicahuaxtla, El Chorrito de Agua, El Sesteadero, Joya Grande, La Cañada Tejocote, La Chirimoya (Pie de la Cuesta), La Laguna Guadalupe, La Muralla, La Orilla del Peñasco, La Trovadora, Llano de Zaragoza, Loma Flor de Sangre, Malpica, Miguel Hidalgo Chicahuaxtla, Pie del Encino, Plan de Ayala, Plan de Guajolote, Putla Villa de Guerrero, San Andrés Chicahuaxtla, San Antonio Dos Caminos, San Isidro del Estado, San Isidro de Morelos, San Juan Lagunas, San Marcos Mesoncito, Santa Cruz Progreso Chicahuaxtla, Santiago Amate Colorado, Santo Domingo del Estado, Tierra Colorada (San José Tierra Colorada), Unión Nacional, Yosonduchi, and Zafra (San Isidro Zafra)
- Constancia del Rosario Municipality (settlements of Constancia del Rosario, El Sausalito, La Cacica [Cacique], Llano Guachicata, Loma Ancha, Piedra Blanca, Rancho Viejo, Río Verde, San José Yosocaño, Santa Ana Rayón, Santa Cruz Río Venado, Santa María Pueblo Nuevo, and Tierra Blanca)

== Sports ==
The main sport practiced by the Triqui people is basketball, and as such, a basketball court can be found in all their surrounding communities. Tournaments are held during local festivals where all the athletes participate. The various institutions of education also hold basketball tournaments among all the surrounding schools. Gaining in popularity, although not widely practiced among the Trique is football.

The documentary film Gigantes Descalzos chronicles a team of Triqui youth basketball players.

== See also ==
- Trique language
- Santo Domingo del Estado
- San Juan Copala
- San Martín Itunyoso

== Bibliography ==
- Fischer Lewin, Pedro; Sandoval Cruz, Fausto (2007). Triquis (in Spanish). México: CDI.
