= San Martín Itunyoso =

- Municipality and town
- Location in Mexico
- Coordinates: 17°14′N 97°53′W
- Country: Mexico
- State: Oaxaca
- Established: 2008-2010

Government
  - Type: Usos y Costumbres (Customs and Traditions)
  - Municipal president: Emilio Martínez López

Area
  - Total: 82.93 km^{2} (32.02 sq mi)

Population (2005)
  - Total: 2,554
- Time zone: UTC-6 (Central Standard Time)

San Martín Itunyoso is a Trique language town and municipality in Oaxaca in south-western Mexico. The municipality covers an area of 82.93 km^{2}. It is part of the Tlaxiaco District in the south of the Mixteca Region.

As of 2005, the municipality had a total population of 2,554.

== See also ==
- Trique people
- Trique language
- San Juan Copala
- Santo Domingo del Estado
