= Santo Domingo del Estado =

Santo Domingo del Estado Xuman' Lii
- Municipal agency & town
- Location in Mexico
- Coordinates: 17°09′21″N 97°50′50″W
- Country: Mexico
- State: Oaxaca
- Municipality: Putla Villa de Guerrero
- Elevation: 2,718 m (8,917 ft)

Population (2010)
  - Total: 927
- Time zone: UTC6 (Central Standard Time)
  - Summer (DST): UTC5 (Central Daylight Time)
- Postal code: 71010

Santo Domingo del Estado is a town and municipal agency inhabited by trique Indians in the municipality of Putla Villa de Guerrero, Oaxaca, Mexico. In this town speak the trique language. Trique language name is Xuman' Lii which means "small town".

== Education ==
Santo Domingo del Estado has basic level school, e.g.:

1. Indigenous early childhood education (Educación inicial indígena)
2. Bilingual preschool "Benito Juarez"
3. Bilingual elementary school "Benito Juarez"

Children go to secondary school and high school in Chicahuaxtla.

== Health ==
In this town there is a clinic provided by the Secretariat of Health (SSA) of the Mexican government, this clinic is run by a doctor and a person elected by the people. These people have the "Popular Insurance" provided by the Mexican government too.

== Sports ==
These natives like to play basketball and football. The festivities are held tournaments.

== See also ==
- Trique people
- Trique language

== Bibliography ==
- Correas, Oscar (2007). Pluralismo jurídico, otros orizontes (in Spanish). México: CEIICH/UNAM, Coyoacán. ISBN 978-970-633-332-2.
- Fischer Lewin, Pedro; Sandoval Cruz, Fausto (2007). Triquis (in Spanish). México: CDI. Archived from the original on 2016-03-04.
