= San Andrés Cabecera Nueva =

- Municipality and town
- Location in Mexico
- Coordinates: 16°53′N 97°41′W
- Country: Mexico
- State: Oaxaca

Area
  - Total: 223.27 km^{2} (86.21 sq mi)

Population (2005)
  - Total: 2,529
- Time zone: UTC-6 (Central Standard Time)

San Andrés Cabecera Nueva is a town and municipality in Oaxaca in south-western Mexico. The municipality covers an area of 223.27 km^{2}. It is part of Putla District in the west of the Sierra Sur Region.

As of 2005, the municipality had a total population of 2,529.
