= Differential object marking =

Linguistic syntax feature

In linguistics, differential object marking (DOM) is the phenomenon in which certain objects of verbs are marked to reflect various syntactic and semantic factors. One form of the more general phenomenon of differential argument marking, DOM is present in more than 300 languages. The term "differential object marking" was coined by Georg Bossong.

== Overview ==
In languages where DOM is active, direct objects are partitioned into two classes; in most such DOM languages, only the members of one of the classes receive a marker (the others being unmarked), but in some languages, like Finnish, objects of both classes are marked (with different endings). In some DOM languages where only pronominal direct objects are marked, such as English, direct objects have distinct allomorphs rather than an affix (e.g., the English first person subject I has the form me when a direct object). In non-DOM languages, by contrast, direct objects are uniformly marked in a single way. For instance, Quechua marks all direct objects with the direct-object ending -ta.

A common basis for differentially marking direct objects is the notion of "prominence," which reflects two properties that can be understood along decreasing scales:

Animacy: human > animate > inanimate
Definiteness (or specificity): personal pronoun > proper name > definite NP > indefinite specific NP > non-specific NP

These same scales are also reflected in Silverstein’s person/animacy hierarchy. Besides animacy and definiteness, another property that triggers differential object marking in some languages is the way the action of a verb affects the direct object. Some languages mark for only one of these properties (e.g., animacy), while others' markings reflect combinations of them. Typically, direct objects that are more prominent are more likely to be overtly case-marked.

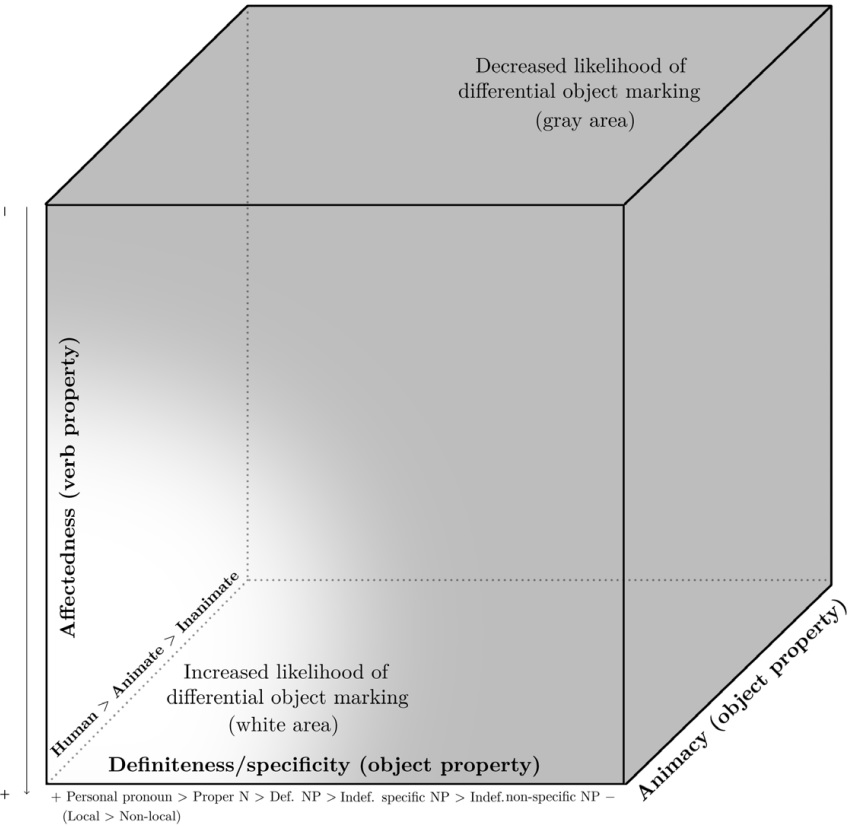
Triggers of differential object marking

== Examples ==
=== Spanish ===
A well-known DOM language is Spanish. In Spanish, direct objects that are both human and specific require a special marker (the preposition a "to"):

- Pedro besó a Lucía. = Peter kissed Lucy. (Literally, "Peter kissed to Lucy")

Inanimate direct objects do not usually allow this marker, even if they are specific:

- Pedro besó el retrato. = Peter kissed the picture.

Yet, some animate objects that are specific can optionally bear the marker:

- Pedro vio (a) la gata. = Peter saw (to) the cat-FEM

Some dialectal variation has been attested regarding the use of DOM in different varieties of Spanish. Balasch finds that, while the linguistic factors conditioning the use of DOM remain the same in both Mérida (Venezuela) Spanish and Madrid Spanish, DOM appears much more often in Madrid data. Furthermore, Tippets and Schwenter find that a factor known as "relative animacy" (the animacy of the direct object relative to that of the subject) is quite important in the implementation of DOM in varieties of Spanish such as Buenos Aires and Madrid Spanish.

=== Sakha ===
In languages like Turkish, Kazakh and Sakha, more "prominent" objects take an overt accusative marker while nonspecific ones do not. Lack of an overt case marker can restrict an object's distribution in the sentence. Those orders are permitted in Sakha if accusative case is overtly expressed:

кини яблоко-ну сии-р-∅
kini yabloko-nu sii-r-∅
NOM apple-ACC eat
‘She/he is eating the/a (particular) apple.’

яблоко-ну кини сии-р-∅
yabloko-nu kini sii-r-∅

кини сии-р-∅ яблоко-ну
kini sii-r-∅ yabloko-nu

кини яблоко-ну бүгүн сии-р-∅
kini yabloko-nu bügün sii-r-∅
NOM apple-ACC today eat
‘She/he is eating the/a (particular) apple today.’

However, when the object is nonspecific, only the first (a) of the following sentences is grammatical, while alternative ordering as in the other three sentences (b-d) is not permitted (an asterisk * marks ungrammatical sentences):

кини яблоко сии-р-∅
kini yabloko sii-r-∅
NOM apple eat
‘She/he is eating some apple or other.’

*яблоко кини сии-р-∅
yabloko kini sii-r-∅

*кини сии-р-∅ яблоко
kini sii-r-∅ yabloko

*кини яблоко бүгүн сии-р-∅
kini yabloko bügün sii-r-∅
NOM apple today eat
‘She/he is eating some apple or other today.’

When the direct object is low on the definiteness scale, it must directly precede the verb, whereas alternative ordering is possible when the direct object is higher in prominence.

=== Other languages ===
Other examples of languages with differential object marking are Persian, Turkish, Copala Triqui, Khasi, Tamil, Malayalam, Hindi, Marathi, Kham, Hebrew and Amharic. A number of languages in Mozambique also show differential object marking. In Turkish, the direct object can either have accusative case or have no (visible) case at all; when it has accusative case, it is interpreted as specific (e.g. one specific person), and otherwise it is interpreted as nonspecific (e.g. some person). Most modern Indo-Aryan languages like Hindi and Marathi also exhibit something similar, where direct objects must be explicitly marked as accusative in the case of definite or often animate participants. Due to the accusative and dative markers being identical for many Indo-Aryan languages, some analyses assert that the accusative case is always unmarked (like the nominative), and instead the dative markers are identical to those for differential object marking.

Other DOM languages include some Aromanian dialects, precisely those of Krania, in Thessaly, Greece; and in the western dialects of Ohrid, in North Macedonia. Romanian also has DOM through the marker pe, these two and Spanish being the only Romance languages with this linguistic feature.

In addition to spoken languages, DOM is also found in some sign languages. In German Sign Language, for example, animate direct objects receive an additional marker while inanimate direct objects do not.

== Sources ==
- Aissen, Judith (2003). "Differential Object Marking: Iconicity vs. Economy". Natural Language & Linguistic Theory. 21 (3): 435–483. doi:10.1023/A:1024109008573. ISSN 0167-806X. JSTOR 4048040. S2CID 170258629.
- Bossong, Georg (16 April 1985). "Empirische Universalienforschung: Differentielle Objektmarkierung in den neuiranischen Sprachen". Ars Linguistica (in German). doi:10.5281/zenodo.4697660.
- Bossong, Georg (1991). "Differential Object Marking in Romance and Beyond". Current Issues in Linguistic Theory. 69: 143. doi:10.1075/cilt.69.14bos. ISBN 978-90-272-3566-4.
- Pensado, Carmen, ed. (1995). El complemento directo preposicional. Gramática del Español (in Spanish). Madrid: Visor Libros. ISBN 978-84-7522-456-5.
- Rodríguez-Mondoñedo, Miguel (2007). The Syntax of Objects. Agree and Differential Object Marking (PDF) (PhD). University of Connecticut. Archived from the original (PDF) on 2011-05-24.
- Torrego, Esther (1998). The dependencies of objects. Linguistic Inquiry Monographs. Vol. 34. Cambridge, Mass.: MIT Press. ISBN 9780262201124.
