= La Reforma, Oaxaca =

La Reforma
- Municipality and town
- Location in Mexico
- Coordinates: 16°37′N 97°51′W
- Country: Mexico
- State: Oaxaca

Area
  - Total: 496.3 km^{2} (191.6 sq mi)
- Elevation: 830 m (2,720 ft)

Population (2005)
  - Total: 3,096
- Time zone: UTC-6 (Central Standard Time)

La Reforma is a town and municipality in Oaxaca in south-western Mexico. The municipality covers an area of 496.3 km^{2}. It is part of Putla District in the west of the Sierra Sur Region. The territory of what is now the town of La Reforma, was originally inhabited by Mixtecs (tacuates) brothers of the race of the tacuates from Zacatepec and Ixtayutla, belonging to the kingdom of Tututepec, under the reign of chief Coaquitecuhtli. 1891: Rancho del Zapote is the municipality of the Jamiltepec district. 1901: It is registered as Zapote belonging to the district of Jamiltpec. The political category is changed to town. 1906: Decree number 23 dated December 31, El Zapote is segregated from the district of Jamiltepec and added to the new district of Putla.

As of 2005, the municipality had a total population of 3,096.
