= Copala Triqui =

Oto-Manguean language of Oaxaca, Mexico

Copala
- xnaꞌánj nu̱ꞌ
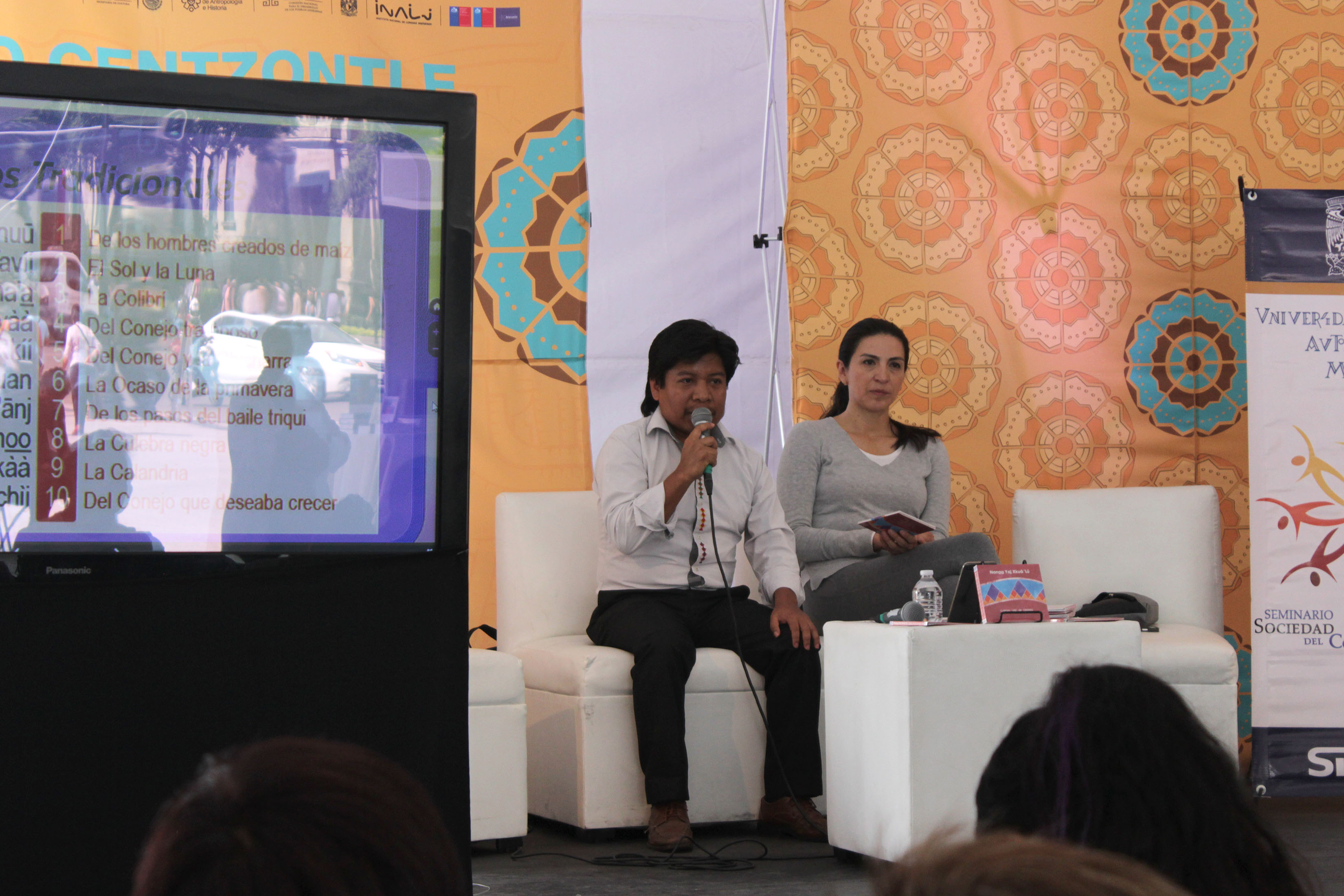
- Presentation in Copala Triqui at the fifth Fiesta de las Culturas Indígenas Pueblos y Barrios Originarios
- Native to: Oaxaca, Mexico
- Native speakers: 30,000 (2007)
- Language family: Oto-Manguean: Mixtecan; Trique; Copala
- Writing system: Latin script

Language codes
- ISO 639-3: trc
- Glottolog: copa1237
- Copala Triqui distribution

Copala Triqui (xnaꞌánj nu̱ꞌ; Spanish: Triqui de Copala) is a Trique language primarily spoken by the síí chihanꞌ in the municipality of Santiago Juxtlahuaca, Oaxaca, Mexico. A 2007 estimate by SIL International placed the number of Copala Triqui speakers at 25,000 in Mexico.

== Geographic distribution ==
=== Greenfield, California ===
Immigrants from Oaxaca have formed a large Copala Triqui speaking community in the city of Greenfield, California. A bi-monthly Triqui language class was piloted at the Greenfield Public Library in 2010.

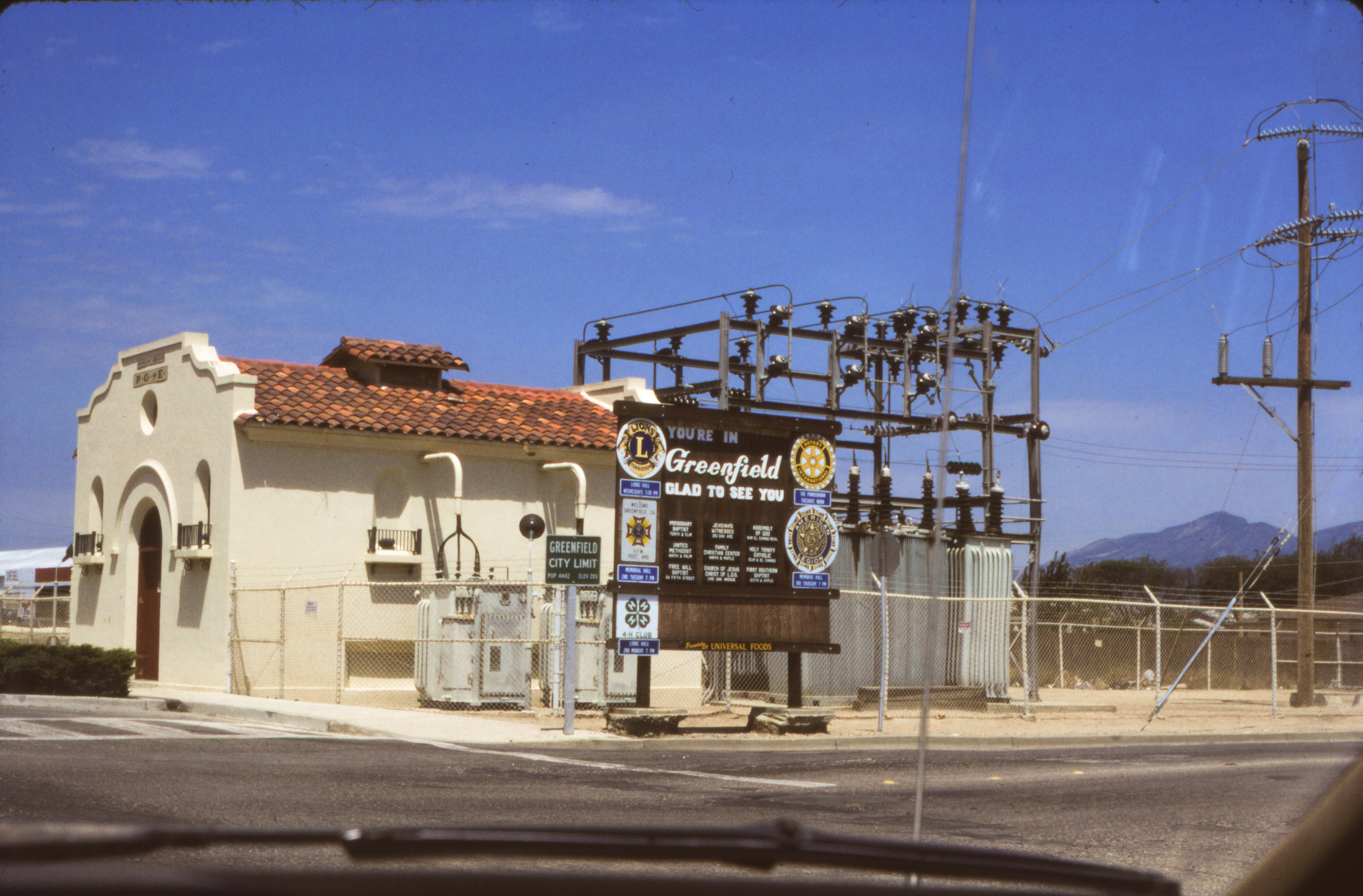
Welcome sign in Greenfield, California

== Orthography ==
Triqui has been written in a number of different orthographies, depending on the intended audience. Linguists typically write the language with all tones fully marked and all phonemes represented. However, in works intended for native speakers of Triqui, a practical orthography is often used with a somewhat simpler representation.

The following Copala Triqui example is written in both the practical (first line) and the linguistic (second line) orthographies:

Me síí rihaan aꞌmii so̱ꞌ ga̱
Me³ zii⁵ riaan³² aꞌmii³² zoꞌ¹ ga²
WH 3 to speak 2 INTERR
'To whom are you speaking?' (¿Con quién estás hablando?)

== Syntax ==
Copala Triqui has a verb–subject–object word order:

Aꞌnii⁵ Mariia⁴ chraa³ raa⁴ yoo⁴ a³².
put Maria tortilla in tenate DECL
'Maria put the tortilla in the tenate (basket).'

Copala Triqui has an accusative marker maa³ or man³, which is obligatory for animate pronominal objects but optional otherwise:

Queneꞌe³ Mariia⁴ (maa³) chraa⁴ a³².
saw Maria ACC tortilla DECL
'Maria saw the tortilla.'

Queneꞌe³ Mariia⁴ *(maa³) zoꞌ¹ a³².
saw Maria ACC you DECL
'Maria saw you.'

This use of the accusative before some objects and not others is what is called differential object marking.

The following example (repeated from above) shows a Copala Triqui question:

Me³ zii⁵ riaan³² aꞌmii³² zoꞌ¹ ga²
WH 3 to speak 2 INTERR
'To whom are you speaking?' (¿Con quién estas hablando?)

As this example shows, Copala Trique has wh-movement and pied-piping with inversion.

Copala Triqui syntax is described in Hollenbach (1992).

Triqui is interesting for having toggle processes as well. For negation, a completive aspect prefix signifies the negative potential. A potential aspect prefix in the same context signifies the negative completive.

== Sample text ==
The following is a sample of Copala Triqui taken from a legend about the Sun and the Moon. The first column is Copala Triqui, the second is a Spanish translation, and the third is an English translation.

Copala Triqui:

(1) Niánj me ꞌo̱ nana̱ maa ga̱a naá ca̱ta̱j riaan zoj riaan zo̱ꞌ riaan me maꞌa̱n ze co̱no̱ maa niánj ne̱
(2) ꞌO̱chrej me ze güii a̱ güii caꞌngaa, [neꞌé] zo̱ꞌ, chumii̱ taj nii me ze ñáán, [neꞌé] zo̱ꞌ, ꞌo̱ xcuaꞌánꞌ ꞌna̱j Caꞌaj ne̱
(3) Ñáán, [neꞌé] zo̱, xcuaꞌánꞌ Caꞌaj me ze me ndo rá yoꞌ ga̱ taꞌníí ne̱
(4) Me ndo rá ga̱ taꞌníí ne̱ za̱ a ne̱ tiempó yoꞌ ga̱a ne̱ tiempó xrmi̱ꞌ me ne̱
(5) Navij rá, [neꞌé] zo̱ꞌ, navij rá xcuaꞌánꞌ Caꞌaj.
(6) Ga̱a ne̱ "Vaa nica̱j" taj ne̱

Spanish:
(1) Esta es una historia antigua que les voy a relatar a ustedes, para tí, para cualquier persona que pueda escuchar esto.

(2) Erase una vez, cuando nació el universo, una abuela que se llamaba Ca'aj.

(3) Vivía la abuela Ca’aj, quien deseaba mucho tener hijos.

(4) Deseaba mucho tener hijos, pero aquel tiempo era tiempo de tinieblas.

(5) Se preocupó, se preocupó la abuela Ca’aj.

(6) Entonces ella dijo, “Tengo esposo!”

English:
(1) Here is an ancient legend that I am going to tell you all, you, and anyone who can hear this.

(2) Once upon a time, when the universe was born, they say that there lived a grandmother named Ca’aj.

(3) There lived our Grandmother Ca’aj, who wanted to have children very much.

(4) She wanted to have children very much, but that time was a time of darkness.

(5) Our Grandmother Ca’aj worried, worried.

(6) Then she said, “I have a husband!”
