= Putla District =

- District
- Oaxaca regions and districts: Sierra Sur to the southwest
- Coordinates: 17°01′N 97°55′W
- Country: Mexico
- State: Oaxaca

Area
  - Land: 2,596 km^{2} (1,002 sq mi)

Population (2020)
  - Total: 96,411

Putla District is located in the west of the Sierra Sur Region of the State of Oaxaca, Mexico.

== Municipalities ==
Putla Municipalities

The district includes the following municipalities:

Municipality code	Name	Population		Land Area			Population density	
Municipality code	Name	2020	Rank	km^{2}	sq mi	Rank	2020	Rank
020	Constancia del Rosario	4,847	7	57.15	22.07	10	85/km^{2} (220/sq mi)	2
076	La Reforma	3,411	9	186.6	72.0	5	18/km^{2} (47/sq mi)	9
037	Mesones Hidalgo	4,424	8	174.7	67.5	6	25/km^{2} (66/sq mi)	7
073	Putla Villa de Guerrero	34,652	1	406.8	157.1	3	85/km^{2} (221/sq mi)	1
088	San Andrés Cabecera Nueva	2,881	10	260.6	100.6	4	11/km^{2} (29/sq mi)	10
300	San Pedro Amuzgos	6,632	5	121.5	46.9	9	55/km^{2} (141/sq mi)	3
377	Santa Cruz Itundujia	10,860	3	564	218	1	19/km^{2} (50/sq mi)	8
392	Santa Lucia Monteverde	6,726	4	156.4	60.4	8	43/km^{2} (111/sq mi)	4
415	Santa María Ipalapa	4,878	6	167.4	64.6	7	29/km^{2} (75/sq mi)	6
447	Santa María Zacatepec	17,100	2	500.8	193.4	2	34/km^{2} (88/sq mi)	5
	Distrito Choapam	96,411	—	2,596	1,002.32	—	37/km^{2} (96/sq mi)	—
Source: INEGI
