= Mesones Hidalgo =

- Municipality and town
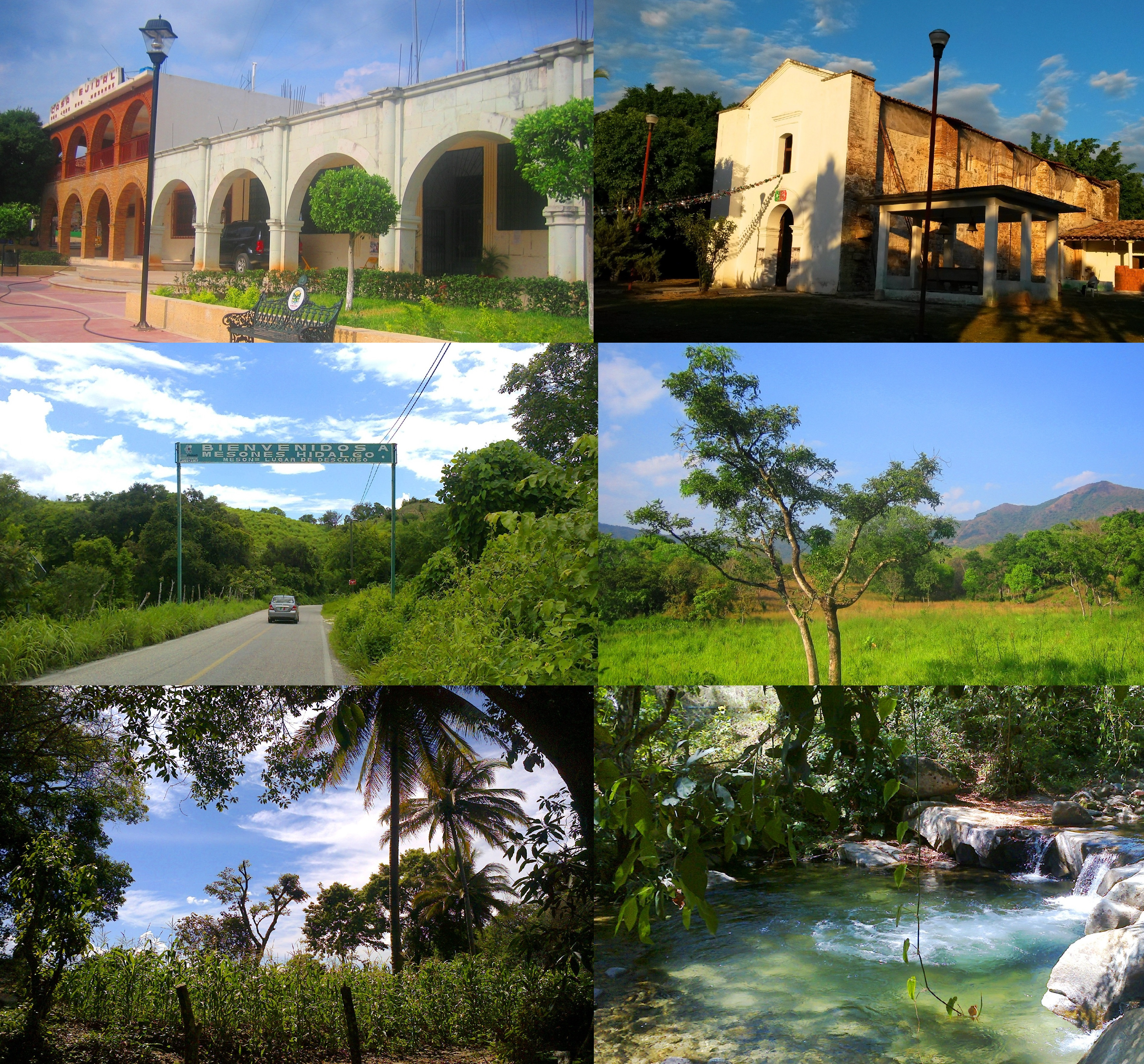

- Location in Mexico
- Coordinates: 16°55′N 97°58′W
- Country: Mexico
- State: Oaxaca

Area
  - Total: 353.4 km^{2} (136.4 sq mi)

Population (2005)
  - Total: 3,961
- Time zone: UTC-6 (Central Standard Time)

Mesones Hidalgo is a town and municipality in Oaxaca in south-western Mexico. The municipality covers an area of 353.4 km^{2}. It is part of Putla District in the west of the Sierra Sur Region.

As of 2005, the municipality had a total population of 3,961.
