= Putla Villa de Guerrero =

- Location within Mexico
- Coordinates: 17°1′N 97°55′W
- Country: Mexico
- State: Oaxaca

Population (2020)
  - Total: 34,652
- Time zone: UTC-6 (Central (US Central))

Putla Villa de Guerrero or simply Putla (Mixtec: Ñuucaa, 'Place of Copper' or Ñuuñuma, 'Place of Smoke'), is a town and municipality in the State of Oaxaca, Mexico. It is part of Putla District in the west of the Sierra Sur Region.

The name Putla is derived from the Nahuatl name Puctitlán, meaning place of mist. The Villa de Guerrero part is in honor of Vicente Guerrero, a hero of the Mexican War of Independence. Putla became the seat of its municipality in 1907 and is located 374 km from the city of Oaxaca.

It connects the Mixteca region with the coast of Oaxaca and is a commercial center for the Mixtecs, Amuzgos, and Chatinos that live in the area.

== The municipality ==
As municipal seat, Putla has governing jurisdictions over the following communities:

Agua Dulce, Asunción Atoyaquillo, Barranca del Cuche (Barranca del Jabalí), Barrio Guadalupe Yutee, Barrio Palo de Obo, Chapultepec, Charloco, Concepción de Guerrero, Concepción del Progreso, Desviación de la Hacienda, El Camalote, El Campanario, El Cangrejo, El Carmen, El Carrizal de Galeana, El Chorrito de Agua, El Limón, El Sesteadero, Gregorio, Alvarez, Hidalgo, Jicaltepec, Joya del Mamey Copala, Joya Grande, La Cañada Tejocote, La Laguna Guadalupe, La Muralla, La Orilla del Peñasco, La Palizada, La Soledad, La Tortolita, La Trovadora (Loma Trovadora), Las Palmas, Llano de Aguacate, Llano de San Vicente, Llano de Zaragoza, Loma Flor de Sangre (Loma del Tecolote), Malpica, Miguel Hidalgo Chicahuaxtla, Morelos, Nuevo Tenochtitlán, Ocote Amargo, Pie del Encino (Loma de Rayo), Plan de Ayala, Plan de Guajolote, Pueblo Viejo, Río de las Peñas, Río Frío, San Andrés Chicahuaxtla, San Antonio Acatlán, San Antonio de Juárez, San Antonio Dos Caminos, San Isidro de Morelos, San Isidro del Estado, San Jorge Río Frijol, San Juan Lagunas, San Juan las Huertas, San Juan Teponaxstla, San Marcos Coyulito, San Marcos Malpica, San Marcos Mesoncito, San Miguel Copala, San Miguel Reyes, San Pedro Siniyuvi, Santa Cruz Progreso Chicahuaxtla, Santa Rosa, Santa Rosa Hidalgo, Santiago Amate Colorado, Santiago Yosotiche, Santo Domingo del Estado, Suspiros, Tierra Blanca, Tierra Colorada, Unión Nacional, Zafra, Zaragoza Siniyuvi, Zimatlán, Colonia San Jose and Colonia San Angel. San Juan Teponaxtla

== Demography ==
Within Putla, there are 7.75k people that speak indigenous languages. These include mostly Triqui and Mixtec dialects, as well as Zapotec, Nahuatl, Amuzgo, Chatino, and others.

== Education ==
When it comes to pursuing higher education, the majority of those in Putla pursue a career in teaching at different levels; 30.8% are educated for preschool level education, 38.4% are trained for primary level education, and 30.8% are educated to teach specific subjects.
