= Pied-piping with inversion =

Syntactic phenomenon

Pied-piping with inversion is a special word order phenomenon found in some languages, such as those in the Mesoamerican linguistic area.

== Introduction ==
The phenomenon was first named and identified as an areal characteristic of the Mesoamerican linguistic area in Smith Stark (1988). Some sources also refer to pied-piping with inversion as "secondary wh-movement".

The phenomenon can be described as follows:

- the language has wh-movement.
- the language has pied-piping; that is, when certain words undergo wh-movement, the interrogative word and also the rest of the phrase moves.
- the word order within the pied-piped phrase is different from the order of ordinary phrases.

The following examples from San Dionisio Ocotepec Zapotec illustrate the phenomenon. As the following example shows, a possessor normally follows the noun that is possessed in the language (Broadwell 2001):

Cù’á Juààny [_{NP} x-pè’cw {Màríí ].}
COM:grab Juan {} P-dog Mary
‘Juan grabbed Mary’s dog.’

* Cù’á Juààny [_{NP} Màríí {x-pè’cw ].}
{} COM:grab Juan {} Mary P-dog

If the possessor is questioned, the whole noun phrase must pied-pipe to the beginning of the sentence. However, the order of the initial phrase must have the possessor before the possessed:

{¿ [_{NP}} Túú {x-pèh’cw ]} cù’á Juààny?
{} who P-dog COM:grab Juan
‘Whose dog did Juan grab?’

{* ¿ [_{NP}} X-pèh’cw {túú ]} cù’á Juààny?
{} P-dog who COM:grab Juan

The difference in order between the noun phrases in (1) and (2) illustrates pied-piping with inversion. (1) shows the ordinary order in which the noun is the first element of the noun phrase, and (2) shows the inverted order found in the pied-piped noun phrase.

The following examples from Tzotzil (Aissen 1996) show the same process:

I-cham [_{NP} x-ch’amal li {Xun ]-e}
COM-die {} A3‍-child the Xun-ENC‍
‘Xun’s child died.’

[_{NP} Buch’u {x-ch’amal ]} i-cham?
{} who A3‍-child COM-die
‘Whose child died?’

== Types of phrases that show pied-piping with inversion ==
Pied-piping with inversion is most often found in noun phrases (NP), prepositional phrases (PP), and quantifier phrases (QP). The following example, also from San Dionisio Ocotepec Zapotec, shows pied-piping with inversion in a quantifier phrase (Broadwell 2001):

¿[Xhíí tyóp] ù-dàw Juààny?
what two COM-eat Juan
‘What did Juan eat two of?

¿[Tyóp xhíí] ù-dàw Juààny?
two what COM-eat Juan
‘What did Juan eat two of?’

As the example shows, languages may differ in the degree to which pied-piping with inversion is obligatory in different types of phrases. Therefore, (2) above shows that the interrogative must be initial in a pied-piped noun phrase, but (5) shows that the interrogative is only optionally initial in a pied-piped quantifier phrase.

The following example, from Quiegolani Zapotec (Black 2000), shows pied-piping with inversion in a prepositional phrase:

[Txu lo] n-dux xnaa noo?
who to STAT-angry mother 1.EX
‘With whom was my mother angry?’

^{*}[Lo txu] n-dux xnaa noo?
to who STAT-angry mother 1.EX

== Environments for pied-piping with inversion ==
The most frequently-cited type of sentence with pied-piping with inversion is a wh-question. However, a number of Mesoamerican languages also show fronting of negative or indefinite phrases to a position before the verb.

Fronted negative and indefinite phrases may also show pied-piping with inversion in some languages, as in this example from San Dionisio Ocotepec Zapotec:

Rú-tè’cà [túú x-pè’cw] ù-dííny Màríí.
ANIM:NEG anyone p-dog COM-hit Maria
‘Maria didn't hit anyone’s dog.’

^{*}Rú-tè’cà [x-pè’cw túú] ù-dííny Màríí.
ANIM:NEG p-dog anyone COM-hit Maria

The noun phrase "anyone's dog" has been fronted to a position before the verb and shows the same pied-piping with inversion that is seen in other syntactic environments.

== Languages that show pied-piping with inversion ==
Pied-piping with inversion seems to be found in all Mesoamerican languages. It is documented in many of them, including several Zapotec languages (San Dionisio Ocotepec Zapotec, Tlacolula de Matamoros Zapotec, and Quiegolani Zapotec), several Mayan languages (Kʼicheʼ, Kaqchikel, Chuj, Tzotzil), and several Mixtecan languages (Ocotepec Mixtec, and Copala Triqui). Garifuna, an Arawakan language of Central America that shares many features with canonical Mesoamerican languages, also has pied-piping with inversion in wh-questions, focus sentences, and relative clauses.

Pied-piping with inversion is unusual outside Mesoamerica but is documented in Sasak, an Austronesian language of Indonesia (Austin 2001).

A somewhat similar phenomenon is found in a number of Germanic languages in which certain pronominal objects of prepositions appear before the preposition. The following Dutch examples show that ordinary objects follow the preposition op "on," but the pronouns er "it," daar "there," and hier "here" precede the preposition:

Ik reken [op je steun]. ("I count on your support.")
Ik reken erop/daarop/hierop ("I count on it/on that/on this.")

Those examples show inversion of a prepositional phrase, but the inversion does not necessarily occur in contexts of pied-piping.

Possibly related is the phenomenon known as swiping in which a wh-phrase is inverted with a governing preposition in the context of sluicing:

Ralph was arguing, but I don't know who with.

Such inversion requires pied-piping but also ellipsis, unlike Mesoamerican languages.

== See also ==
- Syntax
