= Constancia del Rosario =

- Municipality and town
- Location in Mexico
- Coordinates: 17°02′N 97°56′W
- Country: Mexico
- State: Oaxaca

Area
  - Total: 298.54 km^{2} (115.27 sq mi)

Population (2005)
  - Total: 3,796
- Time zone: UTC-6 (Central Standard Time)

Constancia del Rosario is a town and municipality in Oaxaca in south-western Mexico. The municipality covers an area of 298.54 km^{2}. It is part of Putla District in the west of the Sierra Sur Region.

As of 2005, the municipality had a total population of 3,796.
