= Trique languages =

Language family

Triqui
- Geographic distribution: Mexico
- Ethnicity: Trique
- Native speakers: 30,000 in Mexico (2020 census)
- Linguistic classification: Oto-Manguean: Mixtecan; Triqui
- Subdivisions: Copala Triqui; Chicahuaxtla Triqui; San Martín Itunyoso Triqui

Language codes
- Glottolog: triq1251
- ELP: Triqui
- Distribution of Triqui languages

A man speaking Chicahuaxtla Triqui.

The Triqui (/ˈtriːki/), or Trique, languages are a family of Oto-Manguean spoken by 30,000 Trique people of the Mexican states of Oaxaca and the state of Baja California in 2007 (due to recent population movements). They are also spoken by 5,000 immigrants to the United States. Triqui languages belong to the Mixtecan branch together with the Mixtec languages and Cuicatec.

== Internal classification ==
Ethnologue lists three major varieties:

- Triqui de Copala spoken by 15,000 people (1990 census) in San Juan Copala, Oaxaca (and recently due to migrations in the San Quintín valley, Baja California).
- Triqui de San Andrés Chicahuaxtla spoken by 6,000 people in San Andrés Chicahuaxtla, Oaxaca.
- Triqui de San Martín Itunyoso spoken by 2,000 people (1983 survey) in San Martín Itunyoso, Oaxaca.

Mexico's federal agency for its indigenous languages, Instituto Nacional de Lenguas Indígenas (INALI), identifies four varieties of Trique in its Catálogo de las lenguas indígenas nacionales published in early 2008. The variants listed by INALI are:

Varieties of Triqui (trique), per INALI
Variant (name in Spanish)	Autonym	Localities
Triqui de San Juan Copala	xnánj nu̱ꞌ a	Oaxaca: Santiago Juxtlahuaca
Triqui de La Media	snáꞌánj nìꞌ	Oaxaca: San Martín Itunyoso
Triqui de La Alta	nánj nïꞌïn	Oaxaca: Putla Villa de Guerrero
Triqui de La Baja	tnanj niꞌinj	Oaxaca: Constancia del Rosario, Putla Villa de Guerrero

== Use ==
As of 2012, the Natividad Medical Center of Salinas, California, was training medical interpreters bilingual in one of the Oaxacan languages (including Trique, Mixteco, or Zapotec), as well as in Spanish. In March 2014, Natividad Medical Foundation launched Indigenous Interpreting+, "a community and medical interpreting business specializing in indigenous languages from Mexico and Central and South America," including Trique, Mixteco, Zapotec, and Chatino.

A Trique-speaking community has also settled in Albany, New York, as well as in northwestern Washington.

== Phonology ==
The following phonology is based on Hollenbach (1984) and DiCanio (2008):

=== Vowels ===
	Front	Back
Close	i ĩ	u ũ
Mid	e ẽ	o õ
Open	a ã	

=== Consonants ===
		Labial	Alveolar	Post- alveolar	Retroflex	Palatal	Velar		Glottal
		Labial	Alveolar	Post- alveolar	Retroflex	Palatal	plain	labial	Glottal
Plosive	voiceless	p	t				k	kʷ	ʔ
Plosive	voiced	b	d				ɡ	ɡʷ	
Plosive	prenasal	(ᵐb)	ⁿd				ᵑɡ	ᵑɡʷ	
Affricate			t͡s	t͡ʃ	ʈ͡ʂ	c͡ɲ			
Fricative	voiceless		s	ʃ	ʂ				h
Fricative	voiced	β	z	ʒ	ʐ				
Nasal		m	n						
Rhotic			r						
Lateral			l						
Glide						j		w	

Itunyoso Triqui may tend to have ten geminated consonants; /mː, βː, tː, nː, lː, tːʃ, jː, ʈːʂ, kː, kːʷ/.

=== Tones ===
All varieties of Triqui are tonal and have complex phonologies. The tone system of Copala Triqui is the best described and has eight tones.

Tones in Triqui languages are typically written with superscript numbers, so that chraa⁵ 'river' indicates the syllable chraa with the highest (5) tone, while cha³na¹ 'woman' has the middle (3) tone on the first syllable and the lowest (1) tone on the second syllable.

Of the Triqui languages, the Copala dialect has undergone the most vowel loss, with many non-final syllables losing their vowels. The result, as in many other Oto-Manguean languages, is a complex set of consonant clusters. So, for instance, the word si⁵kuj⁵ 'cow' in Itunyoso Triqui corresponds to skuj⁵ in Copala Triqui.

The tonal phonology of other Triqui languages is more complex than Copala Triqui. The tone system of Itunyoso Triqui has nine tones. The tone system of Chicahuaxtla Triqui has at least 10 tones but may have as many as 16.

== Orthography ==
Triqui has been written in a number of different orthographies, depending on the intended audience. Linguists typically write the language with all tones fully marked and all phonemes represented. However, in works intended for native speakers of Triqui, a practical orthography is often used with a somewhat simpler representation.

== Morphology ==
Triqui bound morphology is fairly limited. Verbs take a /k-/ prefix (spelled c- or qu-) to show completive aspect:

Aꞌmiie³² izoꞌ¹. 'You are speaking'.

C-aꞌmii³² zoꞌ¹. 'You spoke'.

The same /k-/ prefix plus a tonal change shows the potential aspect:

C-aꞌmii² zoꞌ¹. 'You will speak.'

The tonal changes associated with the potential aspect are complex but always involve lowering the tone of the root (Hollenbach 1984).

There are also complex phonological processes that are triggered by the presence of root-final clitic pronouns. These pronouns (especially the first- and the second-person singular) may change the shape of the stem or alter its tone.

As a language subfamily, Triqui is notable for having a large tonal inventory, complex morphophonology, and unique syntactic phenomena, much of which has yet to be described.

== Media ==
Triqui-language programming is carried by the CDI's radio stations XEQIN-AM, based in San Quintín, Baja California, and XETLA, based in Tlaxiaco, Oaxaca.

== Bibliography ==
- Broadwell, George A., Kosuke Matsukawa, Edgar Martín del Campo, Ruth Scipione and Susan Perdomo. 2009. The Origin of the Sun and Moon: A Copala Triqui Legend. Munich: LINCOM Europa.
- DiCanio, Christian. 2008. The Phonetics and Phonology of San Martín Itunyoso Trique. Ph.D. dissertation: University of California, Berkeley.
- Elliott, A. Raymond. 2025. Ruhuâ Ruˈman Hioˈóo Gatsii ‘In the Hole of White Dirt’ Legend in Chicahuaxtla Triqui. International Journal of American Linguistics 2025 91:S7-S36.DOI: 10.1086/733818. Copyright © 2025 The University of Chicago.
- Elliott, A. Raymond. 2020. A method comparison analysis examining the relationship between linguistic tone, melodic tune, and sung performances of children’s songs in Chicahuaxtla Triqui: Findings and implications for documentary linguistics and indigenous language communities. Language Documentation & Conservation. Vol. 14, pp. 139-187.
- Elliott, A. Raymond, Pablo Hernández Cruz, Fausto Sandoval Cruz. 2020. Dàj guruguiˈ yumiguiì ‘de como apareció la gente del mundo’: leyenda en triqui de Chicahuaxtla. Tlalocan. Vol. 25, 147-212.
- Elliott, A. Raymond, Jerold A. Edmondson, and Fausto Sandoval Cruz. 2016. “Chicahuaxtla Triqui.” Journal of the International Phonetic Association, February, 1–15. doi:10.1017/S0025100315000389.
- Elliott, A. Raymond, Fulgencio Sandoval Cruz, and Felipe Santiago Rojas. 2012. “Notes from the Field: Chicahuaxtla Triqui Digital Wordlist and Preliminary Observations” 6: 208–36.
- Good, Claude. 1979. Diccionario Triqui, volume 20 of Serie de Vocabularios Indigenas. Summer Institute of Linguistics, Mexico.
- Hollenbach, Barbara. 1977. El origen del sol y de la luna – cuatro versiones en el trique de Copala, Tlalocan 7:123-70.
- Hollenbach, Barbara. 1984. The phonology and morphology of tone and laryngeals in Copala Trique. Ph.D. thesis, University of Arizona.
- Hollenbach, Barbara, 1988. Three Trique myths of San Juan Copala. Mexico City: Summer Institute of Linguistics.
- Hollenbach, Barbara. 1992. A syntactic sketch of Copala Trique. in C. Henry Bradley & Barbara E. Hollenbach, eds. Studies in the syntax of Mixtecan languages, vol. 4, pp. 173–431. Dallas: Summer Institute of Linguistics.
- Hollenbach, Barbara. 2005. Vocabulario breve del triqui de San Juan Copala. (Available at )
- Instituto Nacional de Lenguas Indígenas [INALI] (14 January 2008). "Catálogo de las lenguas indígenas nacionales: Variantes lingüísticas de México con sus autodenominaciones y referencias geoestadísticas" (PDF online reproduction). Diario Oficial de la Federación (in Spanish). 652 (9). México, D.F.: Imprenta del Gobierno Federal, SEGOB: 22–78 (first section), 1–96 (second section), 1–112 (third section). OCLC 46461036.
- Longacre, Robert E. 1957. Proto-Mixtecan. International Journal of American Linguistics 23(4).
- Matsukawa, Kosuke. 2007. Preliminary Tone Analysis of Possessed Nouns in Chicahuaxtla Trique. UTA Working Papers in Linguistics 2006-2007, pp. 31–49. Arlington: University of Texas at Arlington.
- Matsukawa, Kosuke (2008). "Reconstruction of Proto-Trique Phonemes". U. Penn Working Papers in Linguistics. 14 (1): 269–281. Archived from the original on July 19, 2010.
- Matsukawa, Kosuke. 2010. Tone Alternation Patterns for Potential Aspect in Chicahuaxtla Triqui. Proceedings of the Conference on Indigenous Languages of Latin America IV. Austin: AILLA, University of Texas at Austin.
- Matsukawa, Kosuke. 2012. Phonetics and Phonology of Chicahuaxtla Triqui Tones. Ph.D. dissertation, University at Albany, State University of New York.
