= St. Andrew's Church =

St. Andrew's Church, Church of St Andrew, or variants thereof, may refer to:

== Albania ==
- St. Andrew's Church, Himarë

== Australia ==
=== Australian Capital Territory ===
- St Andrew's Presbyterian Church, Canberra, founded by John Walker

=== New South Wales ===
- St Andrew's Anglican Church, Roseville
- St Andrew's Anglican Church, Seven Hills
- St Andrew's Anglican Church, Walcha
  - St Andrew's Anglican Rectory, Walcha
- St Andrew's Presbyterian Church, Wingham
- St Andrew's Uniting Church, Deniliquin

=== Queensland ===
- St Andrews Anglican Church, South Brisbane
- St Andrews Church, Ormiston, Redland City
- St Andrews Church Hall, Indooroopilly, Brisbane
- St Andrew's Church, Toogoolawah, Somerset Region
  - St Andrew's Church Hall, Toogoolawah, Somerset Region
  - St Andrew's Rectory, Toogoolawah, Somerset Region
- St Andrews Presbyterian Church, Esk, Somerset Region
- St Andrew's Presbyterian Memorial Church, Innisfail, Cassowary Coast Region
- St Andrew's Uniting Church, Brisbane
- St Andrews Uniting Church, Bundaberg, Bundaberg Region

=== South Australia ===
- St Andrew's Church, Mount Gambier, in Mount Gambier
- St Andrew's Church, Walkerville, Adelaide, which founded St Andrew's School; see George Dove

=== Victoria ===
- St Andrew's Church, Brighton, Melbourne

== Belgium ==
- St. Andrew's Church, Antwerp
- St Andrew's Church, Brussels

== Belize ==
- St. Andrew's Church (Belize City)
- St. Andrew's Anglican Church (San Ignacio)

== Canada ==
- St Andrews Church, Kingston, Ontario
- St. Andrew's Church (Thunder Bay), Ontario
- St. Andrew's Church (Toronto), Ontario
- St. Andrew's Evangelical Lutheran Church (Toronto), Ontario
- St. Andrew's United Church, Toronto, Ontario
- Church of St. Andrew and St. Paul, Montreal, Quebec
- St. Andrew's Church (Quebec City), Quebec

== China ==
=== Hong Kong ===
- St Andrew's Church, Kowloon, Tsim Sha Tsui, Kowloon (Anglican)
- St. Andrew's Church, Hang Hau, Tseung Kwan O (Catholic)

== Denmark ==
- St. Andrew's Church, Copenhagen

== Egypt ==
- St. Andrew's United Church in Cairo

== Germany ==
- St. Andreas, Hildesheim, Lower Saxony
- St. Andreas, Düsseldorf, North Rhine-Westphalia
- St. Andrew's Church, Cologne, North Rhine-Westphalia
- St. Andrew's Church, Erfurt, Thuringia
- St. Andrew's Church, Lübbecke, North Rhine-Westphalia

== Greece ==
- Cathedral of Saint Andrew, Patras

== Guyana ==
- St. Andrew's Kirk, Georgetown

== India ==
- St. Andrew's Church, Bengaluru
- St. Andrew's Church, Chennai
- St. Andrew's Church, Mumbai
- St. Andrew's Church, Kovilthottam
- St. Andrew's Church, Puducherry
- St. Andrew's Church ,Goa Velha, Goa
- St. Andrew's Church, Vasco-Da-Gama,Goa

== Ireland ==
- St. Andrew's Church, Westland Row, Dublin

== Israel ==
- St Andrew's Church, Jerusalem

== Italy ==
- St Andrew's Church, Rome
- St Andrew's Church, Antey-Saint-André
- Sant'Andrea, Acquaviva
- Sant'Andrea, Capri
- Sant'Andrea degli Scozzesi

== Malta ==
- St Andrew's Scots Church, Malta
- St Andrew's Parish Church, Luqa
- St Andrew's Chapel, Żurrieq

== Morocco ==
- St Andrew's Church, Tangier

== New Zealand ==
- St Andrew's First Presbyterian Church, Auckland
- St Andrew's Church, Christchurch

== Pakistan ==
- St. Andrew's Church, Karachi
- St. Andrew's Church, Lahore

== Philippines ==
- Bacarra Church, Ilocos Norte
- Saint Andrew the Apostle Church, Municipality of Bugallon, Pangasinan
- Parañaque Cathedral, Parañaque City
- Saint Andrew the Apostle Church, Makati

== Poland ==
- St. Andrew's Church, Kraków

== Russia ==
- St. Andrew's Anglican Church, Moscow

== Singapore ==
- St Andrew's Cathedral, Singapore

== Sri Lanka ==
- St. Andrew's Presbyterian Church, Colombo

== Ukraine ==
- St Andrew's Church, Kyiv

== United Kingdom ==
=== England ===
==== Berkshire ====
- St Andrew's Church, Bradfield
- St Andrew's Church, Sonning

==== Bristol ====
- St Andrew's Church, Clifton

==== Cambridgeshire ====
- St Andrew's Church, Orwell
- St Andrew's Church, Steeple Gidding
- St Andrew's Church, Woodwalton

==== Cheshire ====
- St Andrew's Church, Chester
- St Andrew's Church, Tarvin

==== Cornwall ====
- St Andrew's Church, Stratton

==== Cumbria ====
- St Andrew's Church, Aikton
- St Andrew's Church, Crosby Garrett
- St Andrew's Church, Dacre
- St Andrew's Church, Dent
- St Andrew's Church, Kirkandrews on Esk
- St Andrew's Church, Penrith
- St Andrew's Church, Sedbergh

==== Derbyshire ====
- St Andrew's Church, Langley Mill
- St Andrew's Church, Radbourne

==== Devon ====
- St Andrew's Church, Alwington
- St Andrew's Church, Bere Ferrers
- St Andrew's Church, Cullompton
- St Andrew's Church, Plymouth
- St Andrew's Church, South Huish

==== Dorset ====
- St Andrew's Church, Boscombe, Dorset
- St Andrew's Church, Bridport
- St Andrew's Church, Exeter Road
- St Andrew's Church, Kinson
- St Andrew's Church, Okeford Fitzpaine
- St Andrew's Church, Richmond Hill

==== East Sussex ====
- St Andrew's Church, Alfriston
- St Andrew's Church, Bishopstone
- St Andrew's Church, Church Road, Hove (the original parish church)
- St Andrew's Church, Waterloo Street, Hove (serving the Brunswick Town estate)

==== Essex ====
- Greensted Church, Greensted-juxta-Ongar
- St Andrew's Church, Marks Tey
- St Andrew's Church, Willingale

==== Greater Manchester ====
- St Andrew's Church, Eccles

==== Hampshire ====
- St Andrew's Garrison Church, Aldershot

==== Herefordshire ====
- St Andrew's Church, Hampton Bishop

==== Hertfordshire ====
- St Andrew's Church, Buckland

==== Isle of Wight ====
- St Andrew's Church, Chale

==== Kent ====
- St Andrew's Church, Paddock Wood

==== Lancashire ====
- St Andrew's Church, Ashton-on-Ribble
- St Andrew's Church, Blackburn
- St Andrew's Church, Burnley
- St Andrew's Church, Leyland
- St Andrew's Church, Slaidburn

==== Leicestershire ====
- St Andrew's Church, Aylestone

==== Lincolnshire ====
- St Andrew's Church, Folkingham
- St Andrew's Church, Lincoln
- St Andrew's Church, Rippingale

==== London ====
- St Andrew's Church, Croydon
- St Andrew's Church, Earlsfield
- St Andrew's Church, Enfield
- St Andrew's Church, Fulham
- Old St Andrew's Church, Kingsbury
- St Andrew's Church, Haverstock Hill
- St Andrew's Church, Hornchurch
- St Andrew's Church, Ham
- St Andrew's Church, Holborn
- St Andrew's Church, Southgate
- St Andrew's Church, Stoke Newington
- St Andrew's Church, Surbiton
- St Andrew's Church, Totteridge
- St Andrew's Church, Uxbridge
- St Andrew-by-the-Wardrobe
- St Andrew Undershaft
- St Andrew's Church, Willesden

==== Merseyside ====
- St Andrew's Church, Bebington
- St Andrew's Church, Liverpool (in ruins)
- St Andrew's Church, West Kirby

==== Norfolk ====
- St Andrew's Church, Barton Bendish
- St Andrew's Church, Bedingham
- St Andrew's Church, Congham
- St Andrew's Church, Frenze
- St Andrew's Church, Gunton
- St Andrew's Church, Hempstead
- St Andrew's Church, Holme Hale
- St Andrew's Church, Little Snoring
- St Andrew's Church, Northwold
- St Andrew's Church, Norwich
- St Andrew's Church, Quidenham
- St Andrew's Church, Raveningham
- St Andrew's Church, Thelveton
- St Andrew's Church, Tottington
- St Andrew's Church, Walpole
- St Andrew's Church, West Bradenham
- St Andrew's Church, West Dereham

==== Northamptonshire ====
- St Andrew's Church, Cranford
- St Andrew's Church, Yardley Hastings

==== Northumberland ====
- St Andrew's Church, Bywell
- St Andrew's Church, Shotley

==== Nottinghamshire ====
- St Andrew's Church, Caunton
- St Andrew's Church, Langar
- St Andrew's Church, Skegby
- St Andrew's Church, Nottingham

==== Oxfordshire ====
- St Andrew's Church, Oxford
- St Andrew's Church, Headington
- St Andrew's Church, Shrivenham; see Jacob Pleydell-Bouverie, 2nd Earl of Radnor

==== Redcar and Cleveland ====
- Old Church of St Andrew, Upleatham

==== Shropshire ====
- St Andrew's Church, Great Ness
- St Andrew's Church, Wroxeter

==== Somerset ====
- St Andrew's Church, Backwell
- St Andrew's Church, Banwell
- St Andrew's Church, Brympton
- St Andrew's Church, Burnham-on-Sea
- St Andrew's Church, Cheddar
- St Andrew's Church, Chew Magna
- St Andrew's Church, Chew Stoke
- St Andrew's Church, Clevedon
- St Andrew's Church, Compton Bishop
- St Andrew's Church, Compton Dundon
- St Andrew's Church, Congresbury
- St Andrew's Church, Curry Rivel
- St Andrew's Church, High Ham
- St Andrew's Church, Mells
- St Andrew's Church, Old Cleeve
- St Andrew's Church, Stogursey
- St Andrew's Church, Whitestaunton

==== Staffordshire ====
- St Andrew's Church, Clifton Campville
- St Andrew's Church, Landywood

==== Suffolk ====
- St Andrew's Church, Bramfield
- St Andrew's Church, Covehithe
- St Andrew's Church, Sapiston

==== Surrey ====
- St Andrew's Church, Farnham
- St Andrew's Church, Goldsworth Park
- St Andrew's Church, Kingswood

==== Tyne and Wear ====
- St Andrew's Church, Roker, Sunderland

==== Warwickshire ====
- St Andrew's Church, Rugby

==== West Midlands ====
- St Andrew's Church, Netherton
- St Andrew's Church, West Bromwich

==== West Sussex ====
- St Andrew's Church, Tangmere
- St Andrew's Church, West Tarring
- St Andrew's Church, Worthing

==== Wiltshire ====
- St Andrew's Church, Boscombe
- St Andrew's Church, Castle Combe
- St Andrew's Church, Chippenham
- St Andrew's Church, Great Durnford
- St Andrew's Church, Ogbourne St Andrew
- St Andrew's Church, Rollestone
- St Andrew's Church, Wanborough
- St Andrew's Church, Wootton Rivers

==== Yorkshire ====
- St Andrew's Church, Aysgarth, North Yorkshire
- St Andrew's Church, Grinton, North Yorkshire
- St Andrew's Church, Kildwick, North Yorkshire
- St Andrew's Church, Middleton, North Yorkshire
- St Andrew's Church, Newton Kyme, North Yorkshire
- St Andrew's Church, Normanby, North Yorkshire
- St Andrew's Church, Starbeck, North Yorkshire
- St Andrew's Roundhay United Reformed Church, Leeds, West Yorkshire
- St Andrew's Church, Weaverthorpe, North Yorkshire

=== Scotland ===
- St Andrew's Church, Perth
- St Andrew's and St George's Church, Edinburgh
- St Andrew's-by-the-Green, Glasgow
- St Andrew's in the Square, Glasgow
- St Andrew's Parish Church, Arbroath, Angus
- St Andrew's West, Falkirk

=== Gibraltar ===
- St Andrew's Church, Gibraltar

=== Wales ===
- St Andrews United Reformed Church, Roath, Cardiff
- St Andrew's Church, Bayvil, Pembrokeshire
- St Andrew's Church, Presteigne, Powys
- St Andrew's Church, St. Andrews Major, Vale of Glamorgan
- Eglwys Dewi Sant, Cardiff, previously St Andrews (until 1956)

== United States ==
- St. Andrew's Catholic Church (Pasadena, California)
- Cathedral Church of Saint Andrew (Honolulu), Hawaii
- St. Andrew's Church (Newcastle, Maine)
- St. Andrew's Church (Leonardtown, Maryland)
- St. Andrew's Church (Manhattan), New York
- St. Andrew's Episcopal Church (New York City), Manhattan, New York
- St. Andrew's Church (Staten Island), New York
- St. Andrew Catholic Church (Portland, Oregon)
- St. Andrew's Catholic Church (Barnwell, South Carolina)
- St. Andrew's Church (Mount Pleasant, South Carolina)
- St. Andrew's Anglican Church (Fort Worth, Texas)
- St. Andrew's Catholic Church (Roanoke, Virginia)
- St. Andrew's Church (LeRoy, Wisconsin)

== See also ==
- St. Andrew's Cathedral (disambiguation)
- Saint Andrew's Chapel
- St. Andrew's Episcopal Church (disambiguation)
- Saint Andrew Parish (disambiguation)
- St. Andrew's Presbyterian Church (disambiguation)
