= St. Andrew's Presbyterian Church =

St. Andrew's Presbyterian Church may refer to:

== Denominations ==
- St. Andrew's Presbyterian Church (denomination)

== Church buildings ==
=== Australia ===
- St Andrew's Presbyterian Church, Bowral, New South Wales
- St Andrew's Presbyterian Church, Brisbane, Queensland, now part of the Uniting Church in Australia
- St Andrews Presbyterian Church, Esk, Queensland
- St Andrew's Presbyterian Church, Hamilton, Victoria
- St Andrew's Presbyterian Church and Hall, Kempsey, New South Wales
- St Andrew's Presbyterian Church, Manly, New South Wales
- St Andrew's Presbyterian Church, Rockhampton, Queensland
- St Andrew's Presbyterian Church, Skipton, Victoria
- St Andrew's Presbyterian Church, Wingham, New South Wales

=== Canada ===
- St. Andrew's Presbyterian Church (Courtenay), British Columbia
- St. Andrew's Presbyterian Church (Victoria, British Columbia)
- St. Andrew's Presbyterian Church (Lunenburg), Nova Scotia
- St. Andrew's Presbyterian Church (Kingston, Ontario)
- St. Andrew's Presbyterian Church (Strathroy, Ontario)
- St. Andrew's Church (Toronto), Presbyterian church in Ontario
- St. Andrew's Presbyterian Church (Ottawa), Ontario
- St. Andrew's Presbyterian Church (Windsor, Ontario)
- St. Andrew's Church (Quebec City), Quebec
- St. Andrew's Presbyterian Church (Saint-Lambert, Quebec)

=== New Zealand ===
- St Andrew's First Presbyterian Church, Auckland
- St Andrew's Presbyterian Church, Dunedin

=== Sri Lanka ===
- St. Andrew's Presbyterian Church, Colombo, Sri Lanka

=== United Kingdom ===
- St. Andrew's Presbyterian Church, Southampton, England, former Presbyterian church now merged with Avenue St. Andrew's United Reformed Church

=== United States ===
- St. Andrews Presbyterian Church, Austin, Texas
- St. Andrews Presbyterian Church, Princeton, New Jersey, former Presbyterian church now merged with Nassau Presbyterian Church
- St. Andrews Presbyterian Church, Raleigh, North Carolina

== See also ==
- St. Andrew's Church (disambiguation)
- St Andrew (disambiguation)
- Presbyterian Church (disambiguation)
