= St Andrew's Church, Hove =

St Andrew's Church, Hove may refer to:

- St Andrew's Church, Church Road, Hove, former parish church in Church Road
- St Andrew's Church, Waterloo Street, Hove, redundant church on the Brunswick estate

== See also ==
- St. Andrew's Church (disambiguation)
