= Old Presbyterian Church =

Old Presbyterian Church may refer to:

in the United States

(by state)

- Old Presbyterian Church (Parker, Arizona), listed on the NRHP in Arizona
- Old Presbyterian Church (Barnwell, South Carolina), listed on the NRHP in South Carolina

== See also ==
- List of Presbyterian churches
- Presbyterian Church (disambiguation)
- First Presbyterian Church (disambiguation), includes several named "Old First Presbyterian Church"
