= St. Andrew's Presbyterian Church (denomination) =

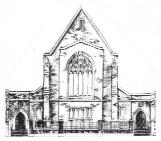
St. Andrew's City Church, Buenos Aires, opened in 1896.

St. Andrew's Presbyterian Church (Iglesia Presbiteriana San Andrés in Spanish) is a Christian church denomination that was founded in 1829 and has its origins in the arrival in Argentina of Scottish colonial settlers early in the 19th century. The first church in Argentina was founded at Monte Grande, Buenos Aires Province. Originally the church had ties to the Presbyterian Church of Scotland but these were later severed.

The church also founded a school for children in 1838 called the St. Andrew's Scots School which later also developed the daughter institution the University of San Andres.

In 2019, the church had about one thousand members, fifty-six elders, fourteen ministers and ten congregations.

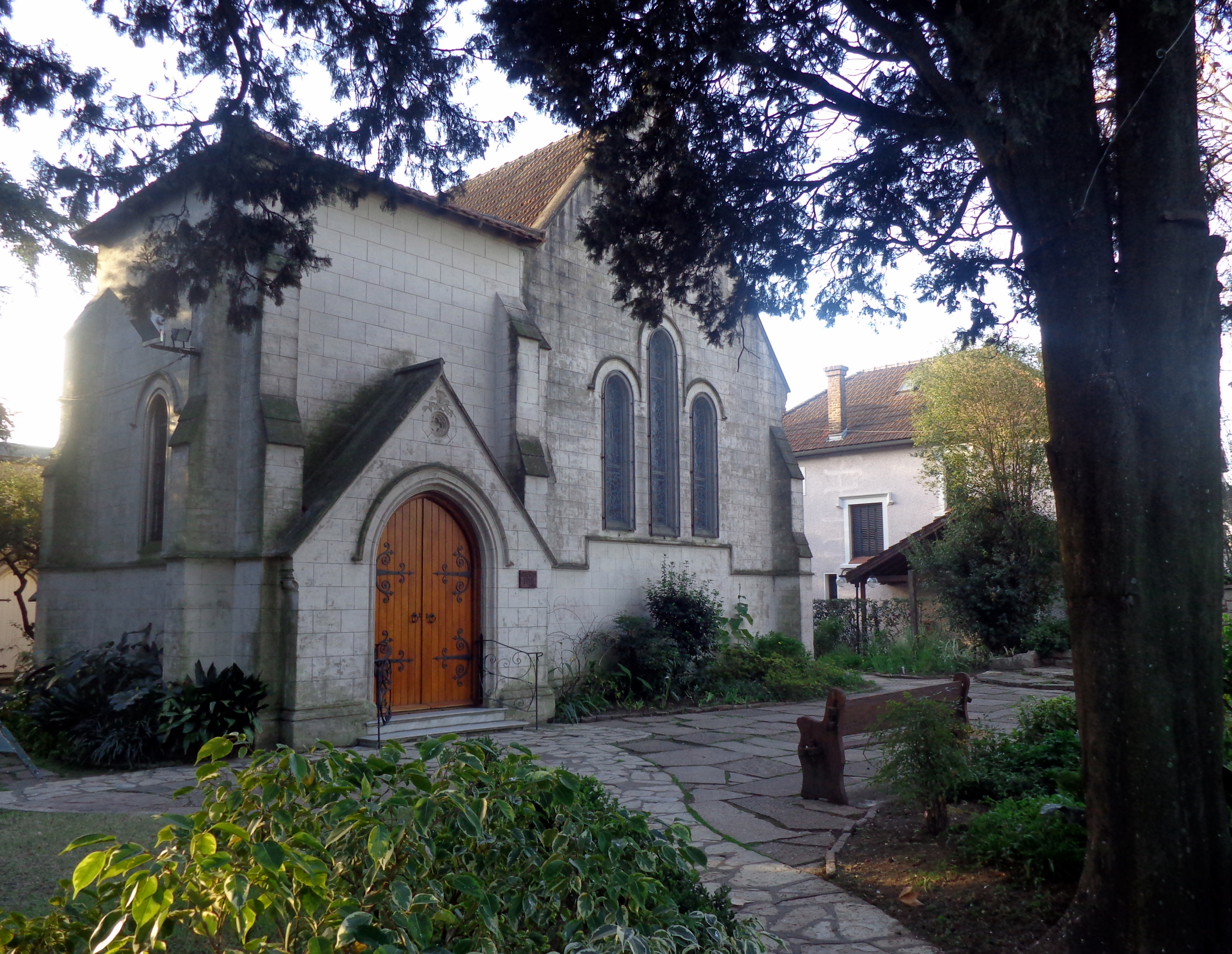
St. Andrews Presbyterian Church, Temperley, Buenos Aires province

The main office is on the Avenida Belgrano in Buenos Aires, and there are churches and missions located in the City of Buenos Aires, Province of Buenos Aires and Province of Entre Ríos, Argentina.

The theological doctrine is reformed, and the form of government is presbyterian.

St. Andrew's Presbyterian Church had been affiliated to the EPC denomination and discontinued this relationship in 2008. By the time been, it is affiliated with the World Communion of Reformed Churches and is a member of the Argentine Federation of Evangelical Churches (Federación Argentina de Iglesias Evangélicas).

== Doctrine ==
St. Andrew's Presbyterian Church believes that the Bible contains the special revelation of God to mankind, and that it is the only rule of faith and conduct for the guidance of its members. The Church reaffirms the freedom of conscience of its members in regards to the personal interpretation of the biblical text.

It also holds that the Westminster Confession of Faith of 1647 and its Larger and Shorter Catechisms contain a worthy and precise summary of the system of doctrines taught in Scripture.

== Government ==
St. Andrew's Presbyterian Church follows the model of presbyterian church government of the early church. It is governed by Elders (Presbiteros), meeting in three courts in regular gradation: the Church Session, the Presbytery and the General Assembly.

Elders can be:

- Teaching Elders (or Pastors): elders elected and trained to teach and preach.
- Ruling Elders: elders elected to oversee the spiritual welfare of the church.

The Church Session (Cuerpo de Gobierno) is formed by all Elders elected (or called) by the congregation to carry out the particular functions. Generally it meets monthly.

The Presbytery is formed by all Teaching Elders and a limited number of Ruling Elders commissioned by each Church Session (generally two per church). It meets three times a year.

The upper court, the General Assembly, is formed by all Teaching Elders and a limited number of Ruling Elders commissioned by each Church Session (generally two per church). The church does not currently have a General Assembly.

The Book of Order of the St. Andrew's Presbyterian Church is a constitutional church document defines the guidelines for the government, discipline and worship of its members.

== Logo ==
The logo the Church combines the symbol of the burning bush with the Latin motto, nec tamen consumebatur. The burning bush appeared for the first time as a symbol of presbyterianism at the end of the 17th century and has been widely used by the Church of Scotland and many other presbyterian denominations. The motto is taken from the Franciscus Junius-Immanuel Tremellius Latin biblical translation of 1579, appearing in the Old Testament in Exodus 3.2:

"and the angel of the LORD appeared unto him in a flame of fire out of the midst of a bush: and he looked, and, behold, the bush burned with fire, and the bush was not consumed.

== See also ==
- Scottish settlement in Argentina
- Presbyterian Church (disambiguation)
