= Woodwalton Castle =

Coordinates: 52.4294°N 0.2208°W

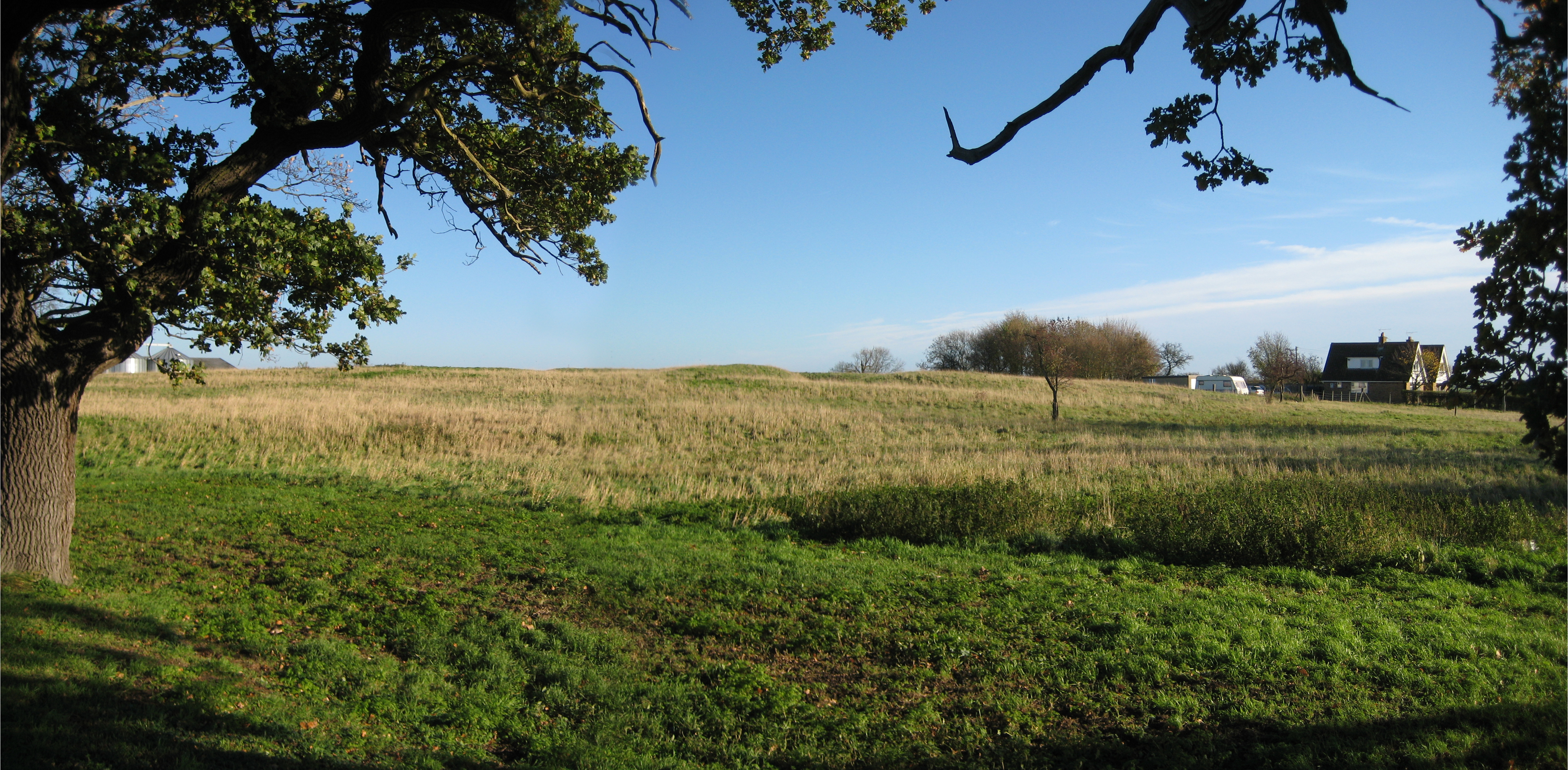
Remaining earthworks of Woodwalton Castle.

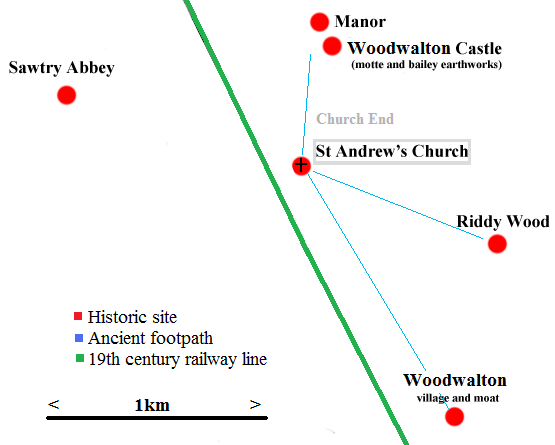
Woodwalton Castle in respect to the rest of the parish of Woodwalton.

Woodwalton Castle was a small motte and bailey castle at Church End, the northern end of the parish of Woodwalton, Huntingdonshire. Located on a natural hillock, the earthworks of the castle still remain, with an outer moat enclosing a circular bailey with a central motte. A large dyke, apparently ancient, runs from the outer moat in a north-easterly direction. The site is a scheduled monument.

It is unknown who built the castle or when it was constructed. It may have been erected by the de Bolbec family who held the manor of Woodwalton between 1086 and 1134, or by Ramsey Abbey which was granted the manor by Walter de Bolbec in 1134. Alternatively, it may have been built during The Anarchy, either by the sons of Aubrey de Senlis, who seized Woodwalton in 1143–4, or by Ernald, illegitimate son of Geoffrey de Mandeville, who moved his forces from Ramsey to Woodwalton after the death of his father in 1144.

The existence of fishponds implies that the castle outlived the period of military conflict and developed as a residence controlling the northern part of the parish. The main settlement of Woodwalton village lies some 2 km to the south, and St Andrew's Church stands in isolation 600m south of the castle, possibly to serve both settlements.

== See also ==
- Castles in Great Britain and Ireland
- List of castles in England
