= Joseph Butler (architect) =

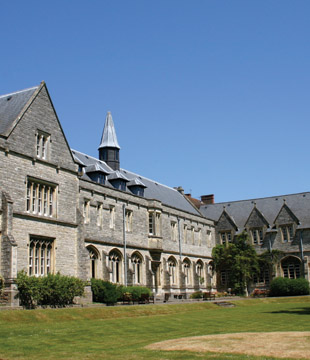
University House, Bishop Otter College (now part of the University of Chichester)

Joseph Butler (1804–1884), born in Parndon, Essex, was an architect, surveyor and builder. His specialist area was that of church buildings. He worked widely in Sussex, England.

== Career ==
Joseph Butler worked as a surveyor in Chichester Cathedral, where he supervised R C Carpenter's restoration from 1846. Butler was responsible for the opening up of the sub-deanery in the cathedral and for its eventual removal to a new church Saint Peter the Great, Chichester.

In 1849 Butler designed the Bishop Otter Memorial College, a college to train school teachers, Nairn and Pevesner described the [original] buildings as being of a 'sober neo-Tudor style' and were 'typically honest and unselfconscious'.

When Chichester Cathedral Spire fell down after a storm in 1861, it was rebuilt by Sir Gilbert Scott. Before the disaster, Joseph Butler had carried out a survey of the cathedral. It was with the aid of his detailed drawings that a replica of the original spire was constructed.

During the Victorian era, there was a Gothic Revival in the design and restoration of churches. Nairn and Pevesner were scathing in their criticism of many church architects of that era describing them as 'meddlers', however they credit Butler, who built in the Gothic style, as saving many dozens of village churches.

== Selection of work ==
Source: Sussex Parishes. Lambeth Palace Library.

=== Churches designed ===
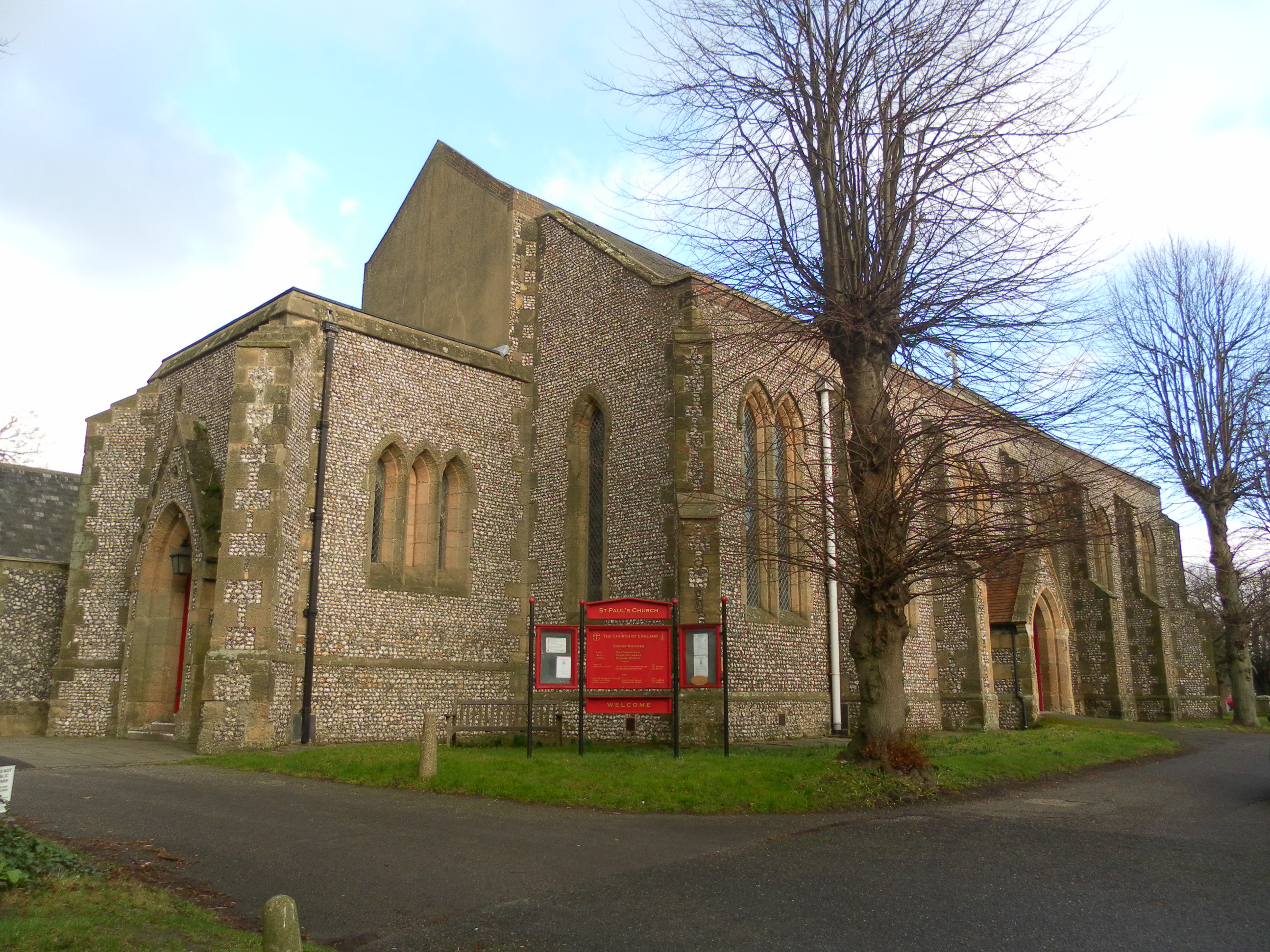
St Paul's Church, Chichester. Built by Butler in 1836.

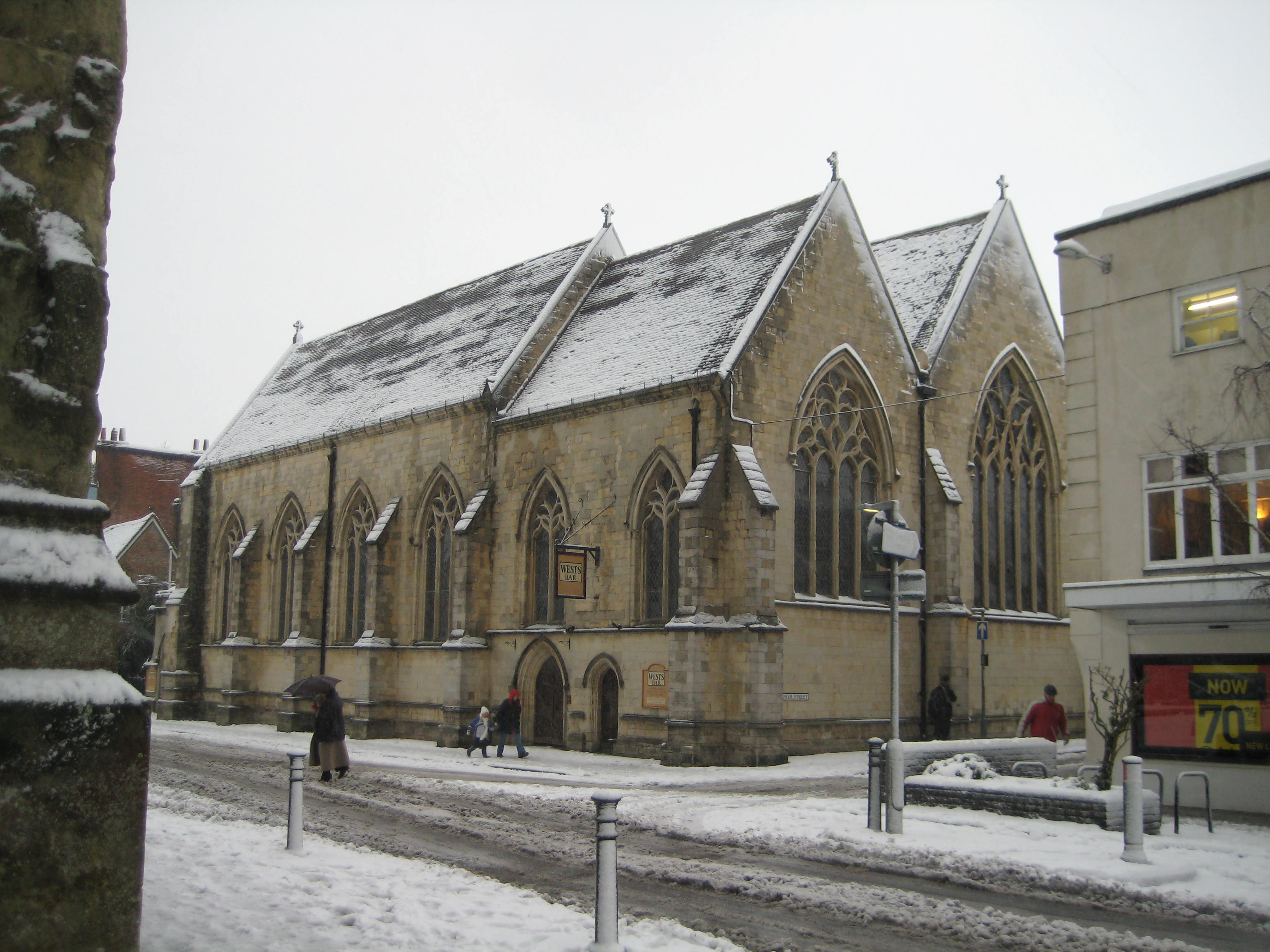
The former church of St Peter the Great.

- Chichester, - St. Paul (1836);
- Chichester, - St Peter the Great (1848–52 - worked as surveyor for R C Carpenter);
- Plaistow (1853–54);
- Stanmer (1838 – attributed (Note: The architect was either Butler or a Ralph Joanes. A plan of the church and of the graveyard still survives and is signed by Butler. Joanes was clerk of works for the site, and when he signed the account off he described himself as an architect.))
- Stedham (1850)

=== Churches restored or extended ===
- Appledram (1845);
- Bosham (1845);
- Brighton and Hove, - St Andrew's Church, Church Road, Hove (1833–35 - contractor)
- Compton (1849–51);
- Fishbourne (1847);
- Forest Row (1850);
- Lower Beeding (1852 – unexecuted);
- Mid Lavant (1844);
- Pagham (1838);
- Pyecombe (1842 – examined);
- Sidlesham (1840 – unexecuted);
- Southwick (1835 – extent of involvement uncertain);
- Stoughton (1844);
- Upper Beeding (1852)
