= Woodwalton Marsh =

Nature reserve in Cambridgeshire, England

Coordinates: 52.415°N 0.221°W

- Site of Special Scientific Interest
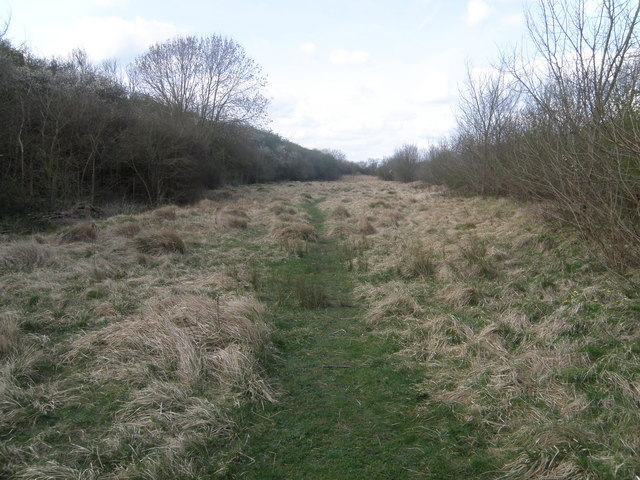
- Location of Woodwalton Marsh.
- Area of search: Cambridgeshire
- Grid reference: TL 211 812
- Interest: Biological
- Area: 0.8 hectares
- Notification date: 1983
- Location map: Magic Map

Woodwalton Marsh is a 0.8-hectare (2.0-acre) biological Site of Special Scientific Interest north-east of Woodwalton in Cambridgeshire. It is managed by the Wildlife Trust for Bedfordshire, Cambridgeshire and Northamptonshire.

This grassland on calcareous clay has diverse flora, including red fescue, quaking grass, knapweed, cowslip, pepper saxifrage, green-winged orchid and the rare sulphur clover. There is also a wide variety of butterflies.

There is access from New Road.
