= Woodwalton =

Village in Cambridgeshire, England

Coordinates: 52.413°N 0.216°W

- Location within Cambridgeshire
- Population: 217 (in 2021)
- OS grid reference: TL214809
- Civil parish: Wood Walton
- District: Huntingdonshire
- Shire county: Cambridgeshire
- Region: East
- Country: England
- Sovereign state: United Kingdom
- Post town: Huntingdon
- Postcode district: PE28
- Police: Cambridgeshire
- Fire: Cambridgeshire
- Ambulance: East of England
- UK Parliament: Huntingdon

Woodwalton is a village in Cambridgeshire, England, in Wood Walton civil parish. The village lies approximately 6 miles (10 km) north of Huntingdon and just east of the A1. The parish population was 217 at the 2021 census. It is within Huntingdonshire, which is a non-metropolitan district of Cambridgeshire as well as being a historic county of England.

The civil parish of Wood Walton is spread over a wide area, its main village dissected by the East Coast Main Line. To the north of the village in the area known as Church End stands the redundant parish church of St Andrew, clearly visible from passing trains. The Grade II* listed church dates from around 1200 and is layered in history: the south aisle was added in 1250, a clerestory was added in the 16th century, and it received a major remodelling in the 1850s. It is now in the keeping of the Friends of Friendless Churches.

Further north are the earthworks of Woodwalton Castle, a motte-and-bailey castle which formerly held the manor of the parish. In 1886 a hoard of Roman coins was dug up in the parish. The village stands at the edge of Woodwalton Fen, an area of special scientific interest.

== History ==
In 1085 William the Conqueror ordered that a survey should be carried out across his kingdom to discover who owned which parts and what it was worth. The survey took place in 1086 and the results were recorded in what, since the 12th century, has become known as the Domesday Book. Starting with the king himself, for each landholder within a county there is a list of their estates or manors; and, for each manor, there is a summary of the resources of the manor, the amount of annual rent that was collected by the lord of the manor both in 1066 and in 1086, together with the taxable value.

Wood Walton was listed in the Domesday Book in the Hundred of Normancross in Huntingdonshire; the name of the settlement was written as Waltune in the Domesday Book. In 1086 there was just one manor at Wood Walton; the annual rent paid to the lord of the manor in 1066 had been £5 and the rent was the same in 1086.

The Domesday Book does not explicitly detail the population of a place but it records that there were 19 households at Wood Walton. There is no consensus about the average size of a household at that time;estimates range from 3.5 to 5.0 people per household. Using these figures then an estimate of the population of Wood Walton in 1086 is that it was within the range of 66 and 95 people.

The Domesday Book uses a number of units of measure for areas of land that are now unfamiliar terms, such as hides and ploughlands. In different parts of the country, these were terms for the area of land that a team of eight oxen could plough in a single season and are equivalent to 120 acres (49 hectares); this was the amount of land that was considered to be sufficient to support a single family. By 1086, the hide had become a unit of tax assessment rather than an actual land area; a hide was the amount of land that could be assessed as £1 for tax purposes. The survey records that there were six ploughlands at Wood Walton in 1086 and that there was the capacity for a further ploughland. In addition to the arable land, there was 16 acres (6 hectares) of meadows and 250 acres (101 hectares) of woodland at Wood Walton.

The tax assessment in the Domesday Book was known as geld or danegeld and was a type of land-tax based on the hide or ploughland. It was originally a way of collecting a tribute to pay off the Danes when they attacked England, and was only levied when necessary. Following the Norman Conquest, the geld was used to raise money for the King and to pay for continental wars; by 1130, the geld was being collected annually. Having determined the value of a manor's land and other assets, a tax of so many shillings and pence per pound of value would be levied on the land holder. While this was typically two shillings in the pound the amount did vary; for example, in 1084 it was as high as six shillings in the pound. For the manor at Wood Walton the total tax assessed was five geld.

By 1086 there was already a church at Wood Walton.

Ordnance Survey maps from the 1920s show a number of simple agricultural tramways on the fen north of Woodwalton village. The two longest ran north from Castle Hill Farm and south from Speechleys Farm and a wharf on New Dyke.

== Government ==
As a civil parish, Wood Walton has a parish council. The parish council is elected by the residents of the parish who have registered on the electoral roll; the parish council is the lowest tier of government in England. A parish council is responsible for providing and maintaining a variety of local services including allotments and a cemetery; grass cutting and tree planting within public open spaces such as a village green or playing fields. The parish council reviews all planning applications that might affect the parish and makes recommendations to Huntingdonshire District Council, which is the local planning authority for the parish. The parish council also represents the views of the parish on issues such as local transport, policing and the environment. The parish council raises its own tax to pay for these services, known as the parish precept, which is collected as part of the Council Tax. the parish council has five councillors.

Wood Walton was in the historic and administrative county of Huntingdonshire until 1965. From 1965, the village was part of the new administrative county of Huntingdon and Peterborough. Then in 1974, following the Local Government Act 1972, Wood Walton became a part of the county of Cambridgeshire.

The second tier of local government is Huntingdonshire District Council which is a non-metropolitan district of Cambridgeshire and has its headquarters in Huntingdon. It collects the council tax, and provides services such as building regulations, local planning, environmental health, leisure and tourism. Wood Walton is a part of the Sawtry ward, which elects two councillors. District councillors serve for four-year terms following elections to Huntingdonshire District Council.

For Wood Walton, the highest tier of local government is Cambridgeshire County Council which has administration buildings in Cambridge. The county council provides county-wide services such as major road infrastructure, fire and rescue, education, social services, libraries and heritage services. Wood Walton is part of the electoral division of Warboys and the Stukeleys and is represented on the county council by one councillor.

For Westminster elections, Wood Walton is part of the Huntingdon constituency.

== Demography ==
=== Population ===
In the period 1801 to 1901 the population of Wood Walton was recorded every ten years by the UK census. During this time the population was in the range of 158 (the lowest was in 1811) and 388 (the highest was in 1861).

From 1901, a census was taken every ten years with the exception of 1941 (due to the Second World War).

Parish	1911	1921	1931	1951	1961	1971	1981	1991	2001	2011
Wood Walton	281	251	274	277	271	208	213	214	237	243

All population census figures from report Historic Census figures Cambridgeshire to 2011 by Cambridgeshire Insight.

In 2011, the parish covered an area of 4,860 acres (1,967 hectares) and the population density of Wood Walton in 2011 was 32 persons per square mile (12.4 per square kilometre).
