= St. Andrew Catholic Church =

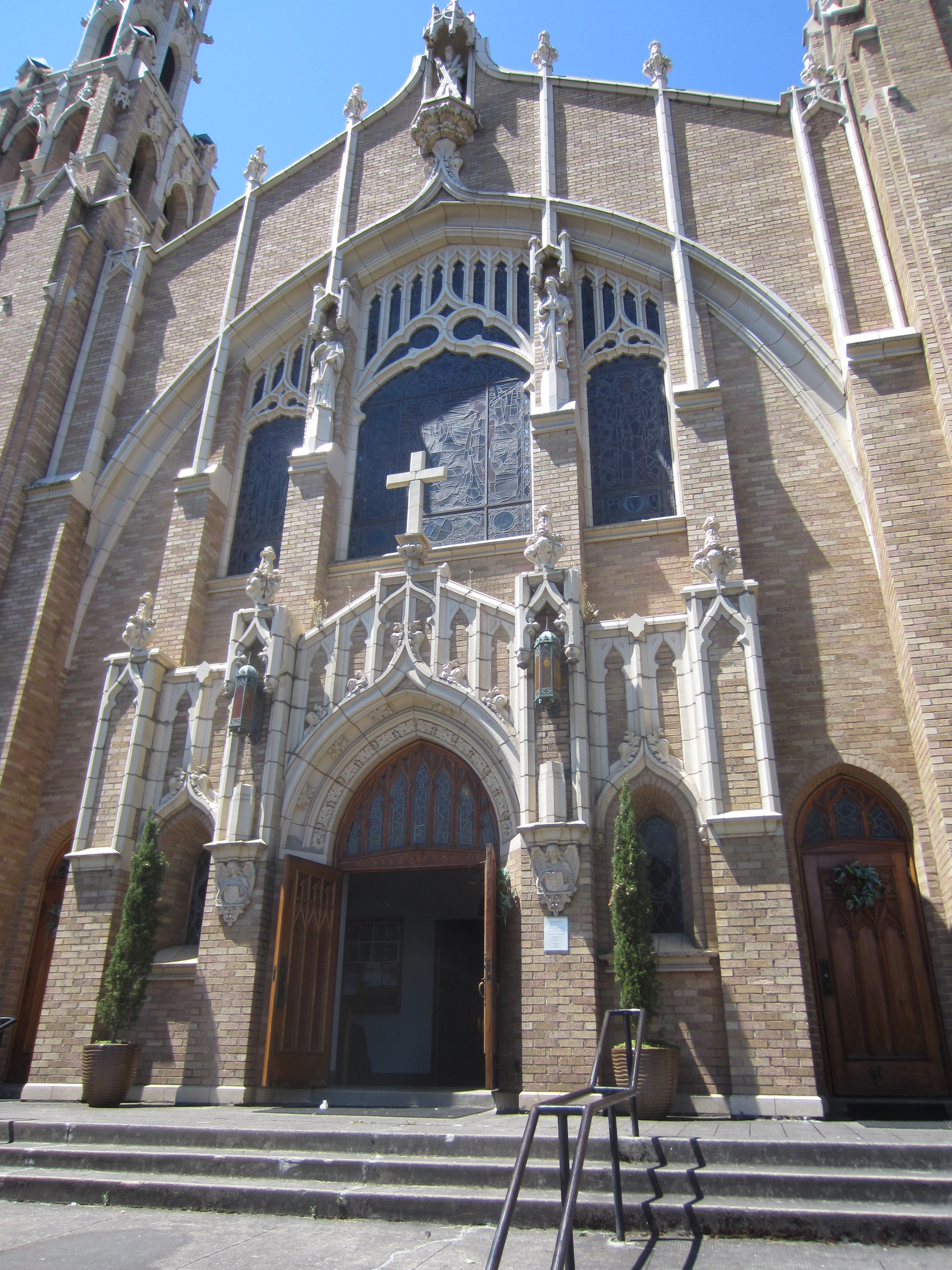
- The church's front exterior, 2019
- St. Andrew Catholic Church
- 45°33′32.0″N 122°39′25.1″W
- Location: 806 NE Alberta Street, Portland, Oregon
- Country: United States

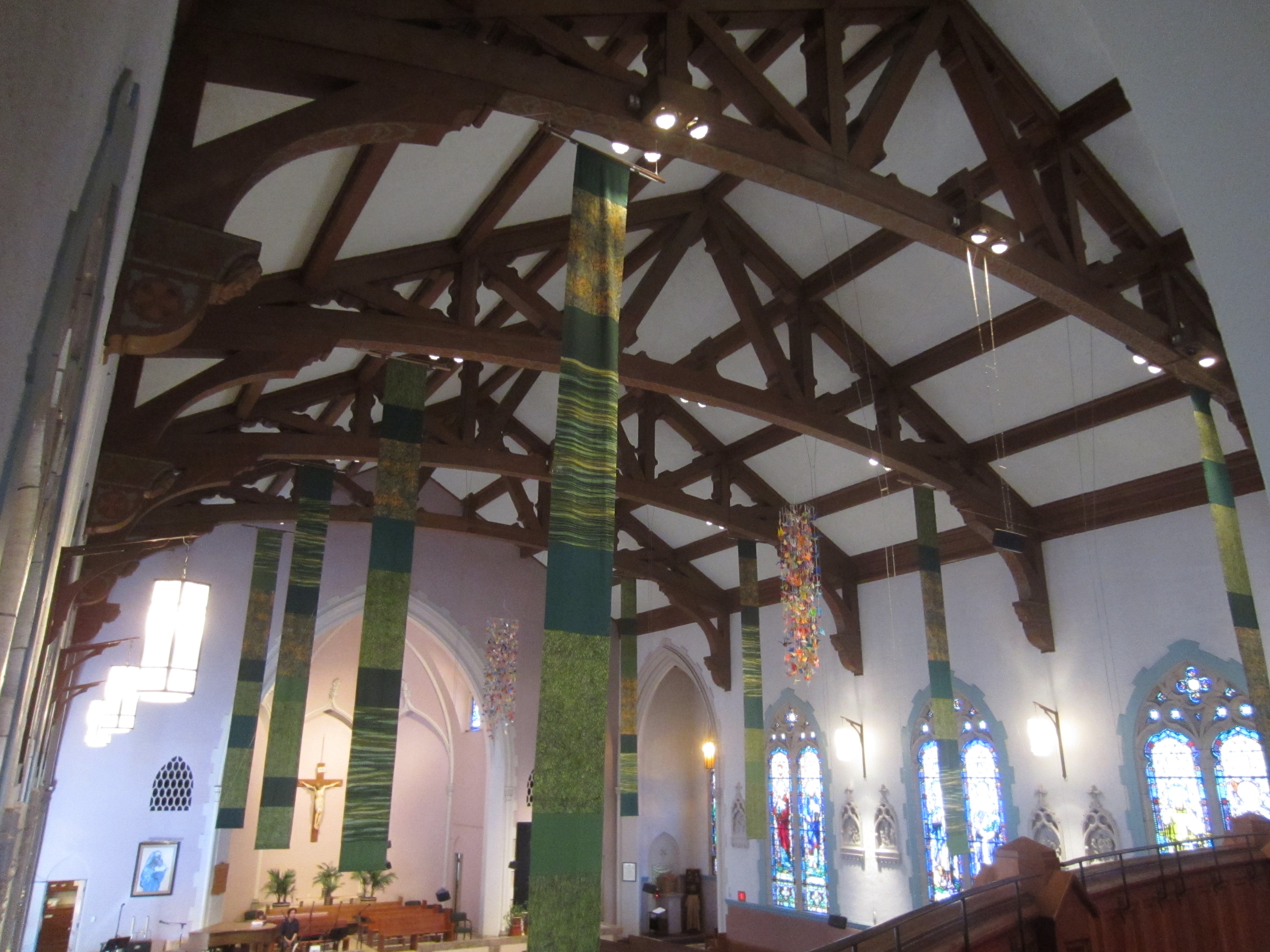
The church's interior in 2019

St. Andrew Catholic Church is located in northeast Portland, Oregon's King neighborhood, United States. The church hosts two Spanish-language and one Mayan-language mass weekly, as of 2017.

== History ==
The church hosted the annual national Maya conference in 2011. In 2019, parishioners marched in Portland's annual pride parade, despite Archbishop Alexander King Sample's preference otherwise.

== See also ==
- Culture of Portland, Oregon
- Religion in Portland, Oregon
