= St. Andrew's Presbyterian Church (Victoria, British Columbia) =

Presbyterian church in Victoria, British Columbia, Canada

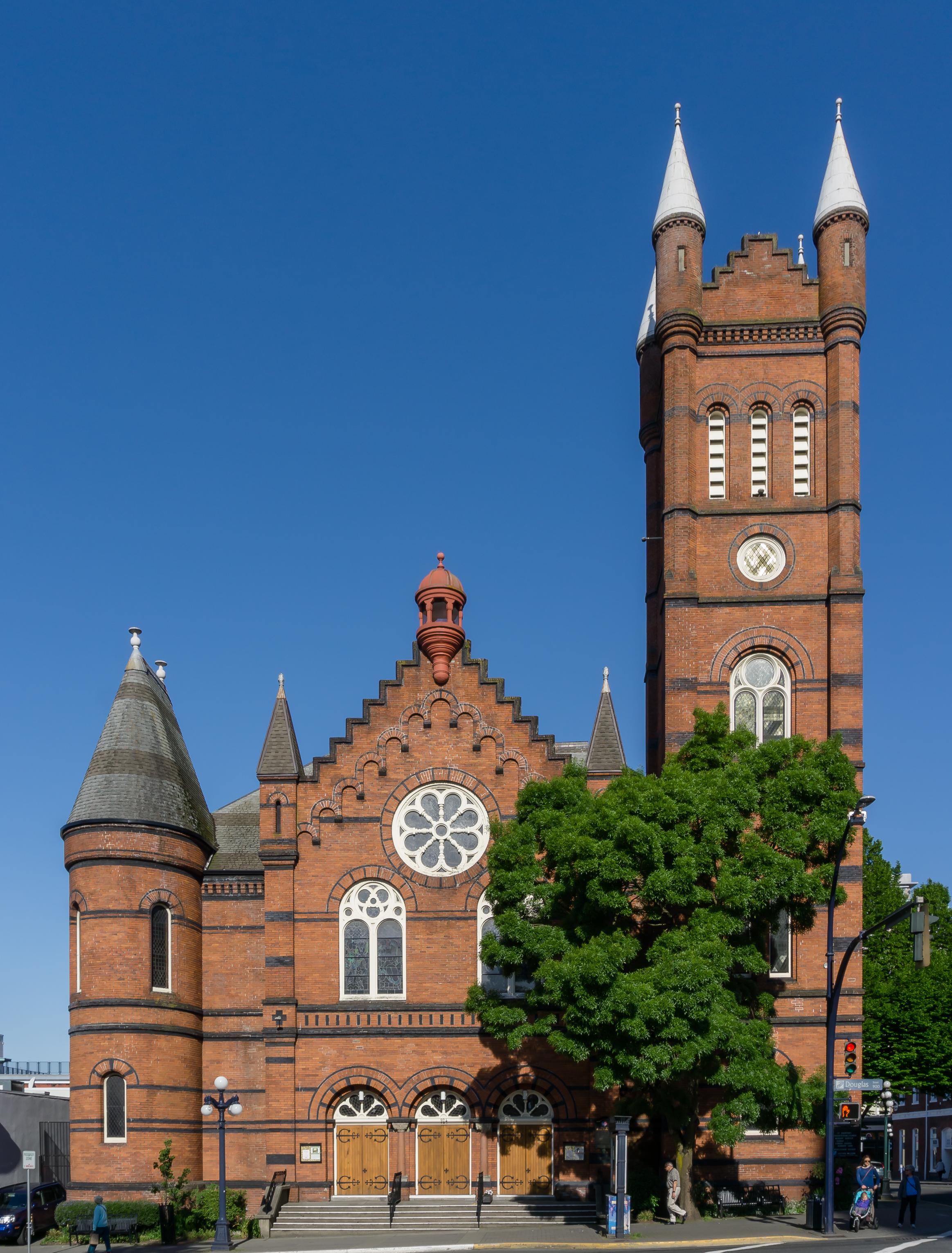
- St. Andrew's Presbyterian Church, 2018
- St. Andrew's Presbyterian Church
- 48°25′26″N 123°21′58″W
- Location: Victoria, British Columbia
- Country: Canada
- Denomination: Presbyterian
- Website: standrewsvictoria.ca

History
- Founded: 1862; 164 years ago
- Founder: John Hall

Architecture
- Architect: Leonard Buttress Trimen
- Style: Scottish baronial
- Years built: 1889–1890

St. Andrew's Presbyterian Church is a Presbyterian church in downtown Victoria, British Columbia, Canada. The congregation was founded in 1862 and the current church building was completed in 1890.

== History ==
The congregation was founded in 1862 by Irish-born Rev. John Hall. Their first church building opened in November 1863 on the corner of Blanshard Street and Pandora Street. The earlier ministers of the church played an important role in spreading Presbyterianism throughout Vancouver Island and the interior of the province.

As the congregation grew in size, owing to Victoria's sizeable Scottish population, the corner stone for the present church was laid on March 7, 1889. The church was designed in the Scottish baronial style by architect Leonard Buttress Trimen. It was dedicated on January 12, 1890. The church was one of the first in North America to be constructed with electric lights.

The church has had many prominent congregants including Premier John Robson, whose funeral was held in the church, and industrialist Robert Dunsmuir.

In 1925, St. Andrew's voted to remain Presbyterian when two-thirds of the denomination split to form the United Church of Canada. In 1979, the church received heritage designation from the City of Victoria.

== See also ==
- List of historic places in Victoria, British Columbia
