= St Andrew's Church, Antey-Saint-André =

Saint Andrew church
- Chiesa di Sant'Andrea (Italian); Église Saint-André (French)
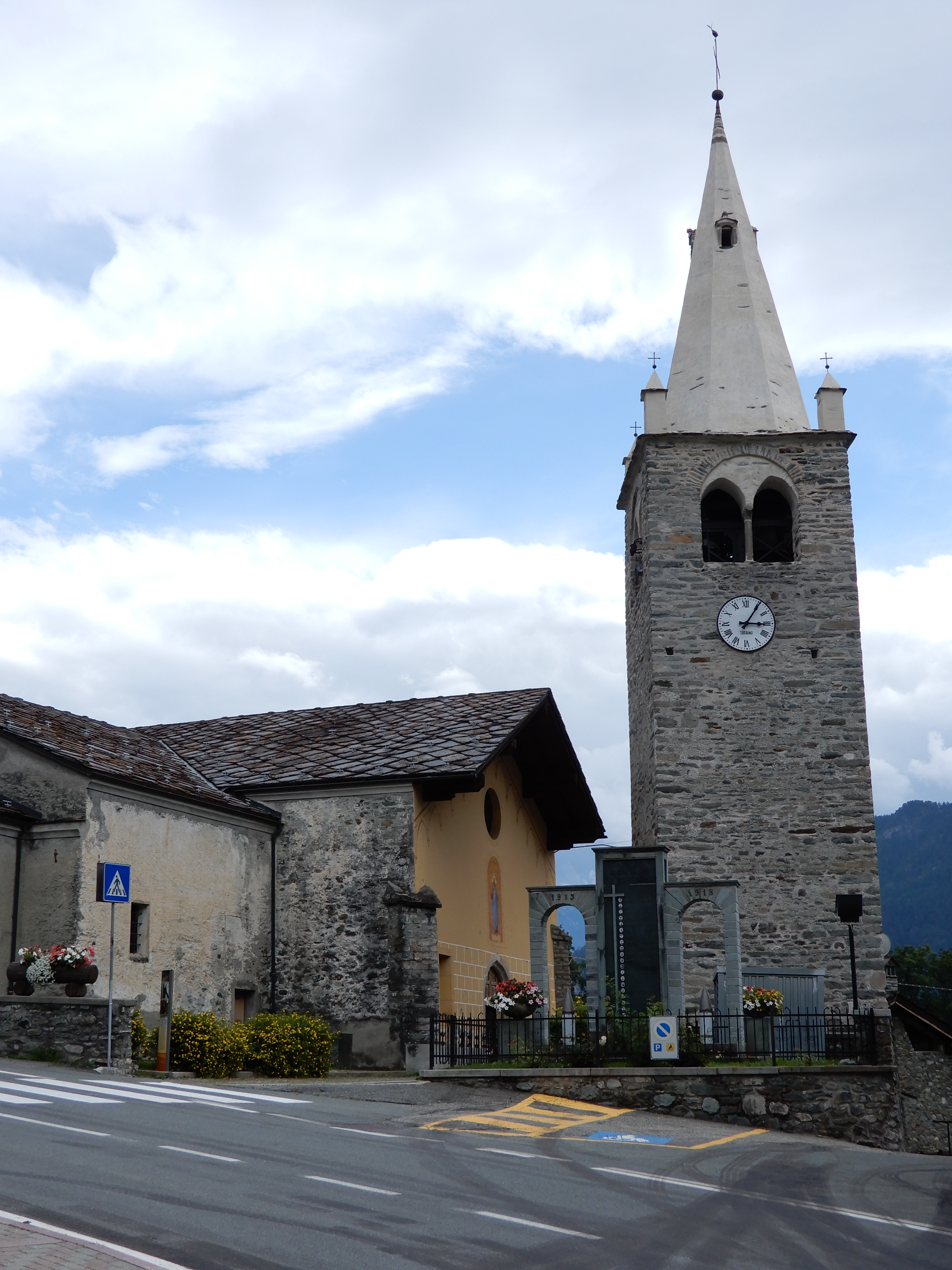
- Sant'Andrea, Antey-Saint-André in 2021
- Click on the map for a fullscreen view
- 45°48′16.81″N 7°35′32.13″E
- Country: Italy
- Denomination: Roman Catholic

Architecture
- Functional status: Active

Administration
- Diocese: Diocese of Aosta

The Saint Andrew parish church (Italian: Chiesa parrocchiale di Sant'Andrea; French: Église paroissiale Saint-André) is a Roman Catholic church located in Antey-Saint-André, Italy.

== History ==
The church dates back to the mid-15th century. In 1547, two chapels were added. The isolated bell tower was most likely built around 1555 on the remains of an old medieval fortified house. During the 19th century, the church underwent significant alterations, including the addition of two side aisles in 1869.

== Description ==
The church features a three-nave structure and a semicircular apse. The organ loft, dating back to the 19th century, is made of carved walnut panels depicting musical instruments and leaves. On the main façade, flanked at the corners by two stone buttresses, is a finely carved stone entrance portal dating back to the late Gothic period.

== Gallery ==
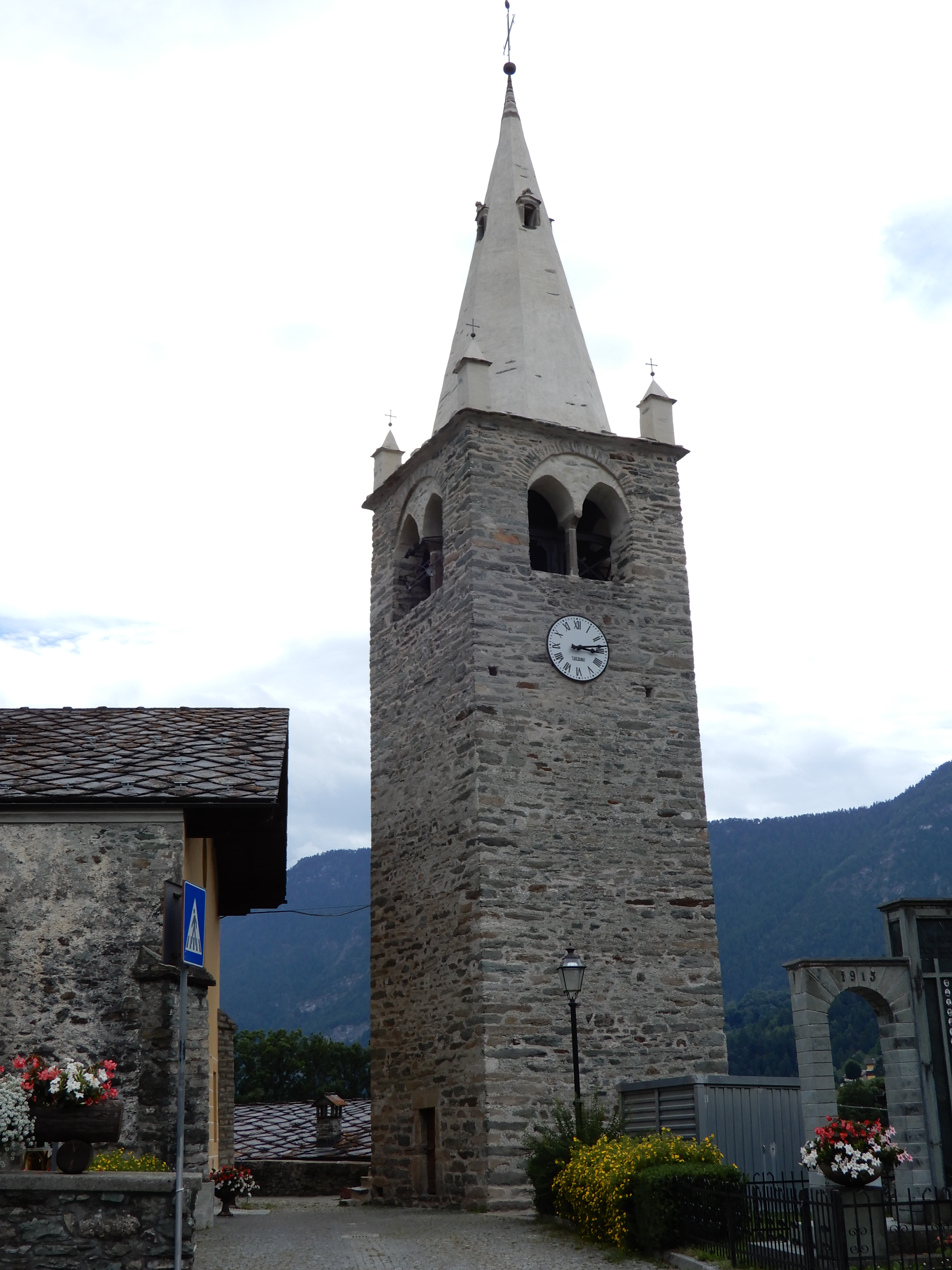

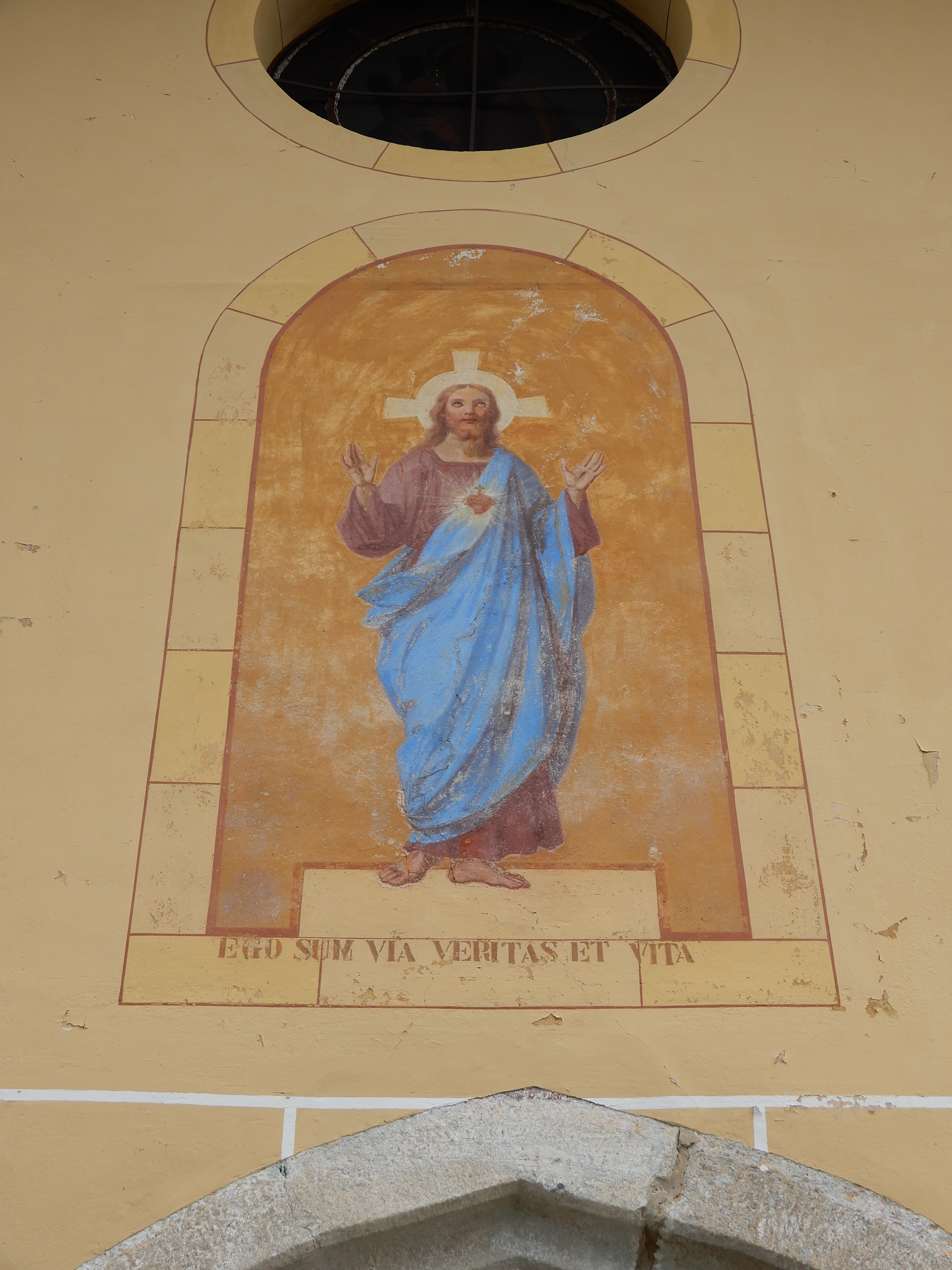

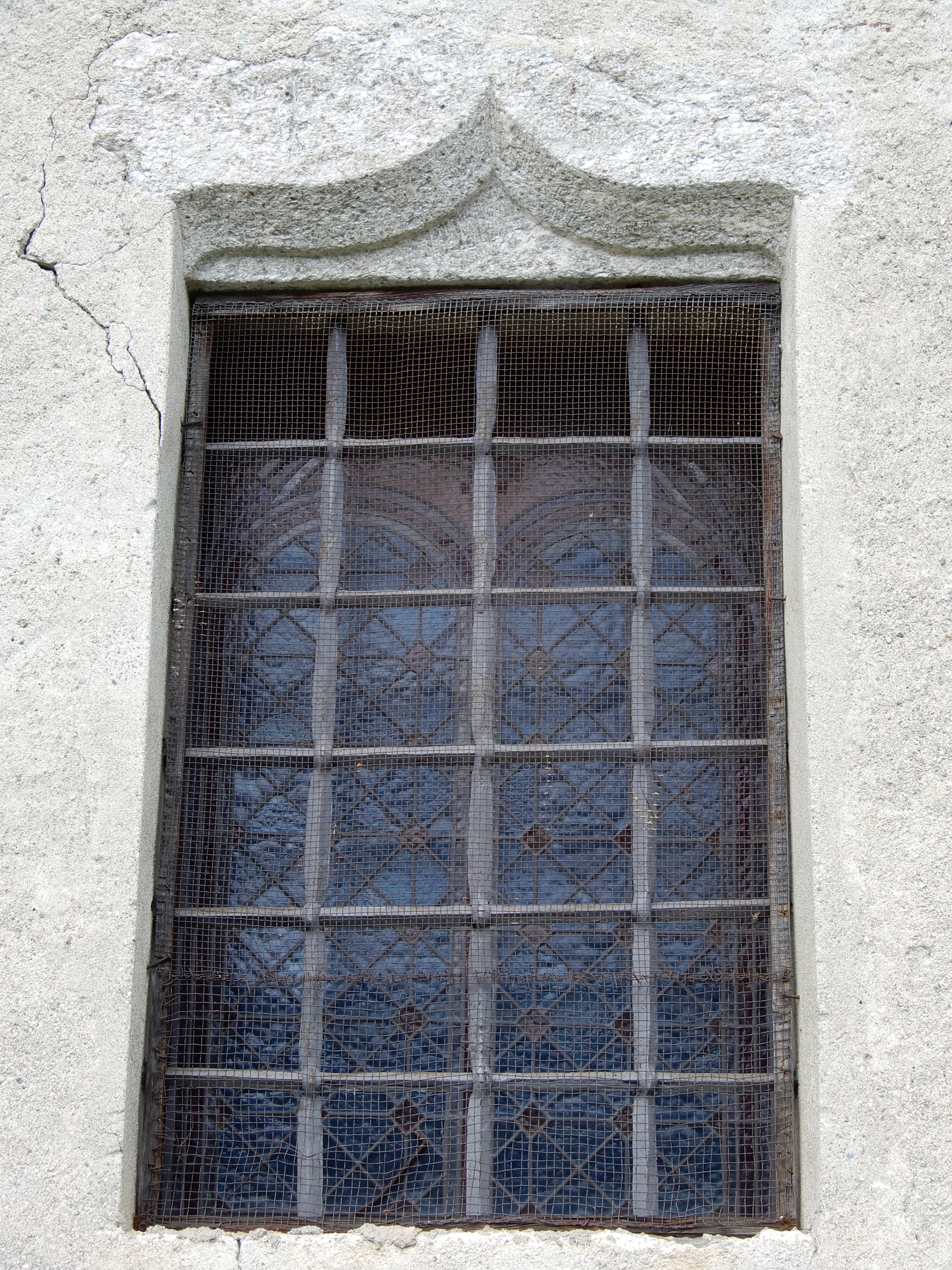
