= St Andrew's Church, Woodwalton =

Redundant church in Cambridgeshire, England

Coordinates: 52.4241°N 0.2237°W

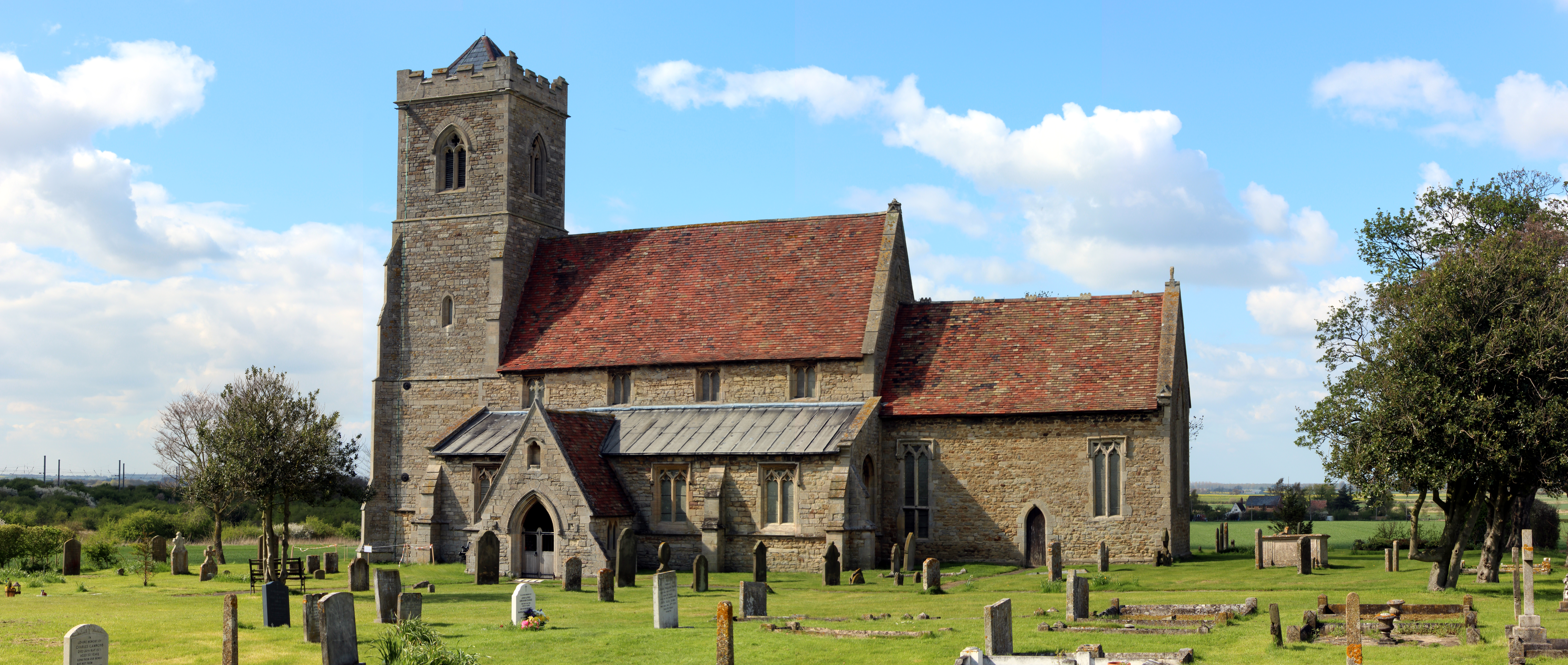
- St Andrew's Church, Woodwalton, from the southeast

- Location in Cambridgeshire
- Location: Woodwalton, Cambridgeshire
- Country: England
- Denomination: Anglican
- Website: friendsoffriendlesschurches.org.uk/church/st-andrews-wood-walton-cambridgeshire/

History
- Dedication: Saint Andrew

Architecture
- Functional status: Redundant
- Heritage designation: Grade II*
- Designated: 28 January 1958
- Architectural type: Church
- Style: Gothic

Specifications
- Materials: Limestone with terracotta tiled roofs

St Andrew's Church is a redundant Anglican church standing in an isolated position in fields about 2 kilometres (1.2 mi) to the north of the village of Woodwalton (often Wood Walton) in Huntingdonshire, Cambridgeshire, England. It is about 200 metres (219 yd) to the east of the East Coast Main Line and is visible from the passing trains. The church is recorded in the National Heritage List for England as Grade II* listed, and is under the care of the Friends of Friendless Churches.

== Early history ==
The church is recorded in the Domesday Book of 1086, and at that time probably consisted of a nave without aisles and a chancel. The isolated position of the church is thought to be due to its central location between Woodwalton Castle, a motte and bailey castle to the north, Sawtry Abbey to the west and the village settlement to the south. A considerable part of the parish forms part of Woodwalton Fen. In about 1250 the south aisle was added, and in about 1330 the north aisle was added (or rebuilt) and the chancel was rebuilt. The tower is thought to date from the 14th century. In the 16th century the clerestory was added. The church was restored between 1856 and 1859 when the walls of the aisles, the tower and the porch were rebuilt and a vestry was added; the architect was Edward Browning of Stamford. The vestry was rebuilt in 1897, and the porch and part of the south aisle were rebuilt in 1906. In 1911 the vestry was modified to form the organ chamber.

== Architecture ==
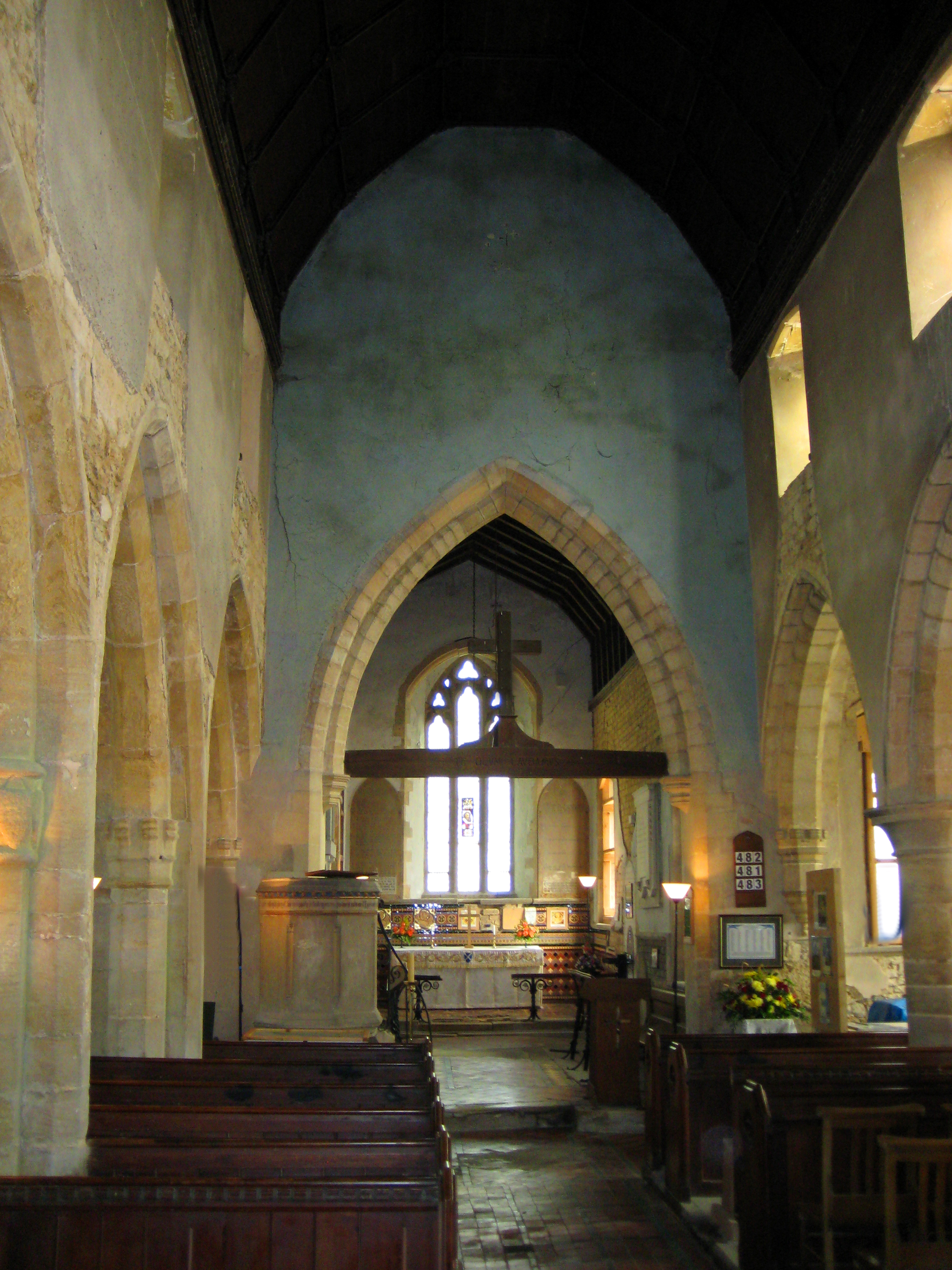
The nave looking towards the chancel, taken during a Heritage Open Day, September 2010. The light blue paint over the chancel arch covers over a Victorian pattern, just visible through the cracks.

St Andrew's is constructed in coursed limestone rubble with limestone dressings, and has terracotta tiled roofs. Its plan consists of a four-bay nave with clerestory, north and south aisles, a chancel with an organ chamber to the north, a south porch, and a west tower. The tower is in three stages with diagonal buttresses and is surmounted by a battlemented parapet. In the lowest stage is a west door with a pointed arch over which is a window with ogee tracery. The middle stage has lancet windows and in the upper stage are two-light bell openings. The east window has three lights. The porch is gabled with an empty niche which once contained a statue of Saint Andrew.

Internally the arcades are in different styles, the south arcade being Early English while the north arcade is Perpendicular. The flooring is of 19th-century tiles. The font also dates from the 19th century and is in 15th-century style.

An original 14th-century stained glass window is on loan to the Stained Glass Museum in Ely Cathedral. This described as "one of the most delicate of all fourteenth-century windows in Cambridgeshire, showing St Catherine holding her wheel". The second light in the window depicts St Lawrence, depicted under a decorative canopy.

In the church are several monuments, the best of which are to the memory of the Hussey family, as are the 1874 tiles and the reredos. Under the chancel is the family vault, placed between the hypocaust system introduced in the 19th century. Also in the church are several early stone coffin lids.

The tower contains a ring of four bells. Two of these were cast by Joseph Eayre, one in 1764, the other bell being undated. The other two bells were cast in 1841 by Thomas Mears II of the Whitechapel Bell Foundry. As of 2010, because of the condition of the tower, it is not possible for the bells to be rung.

== Recent history and present day ==
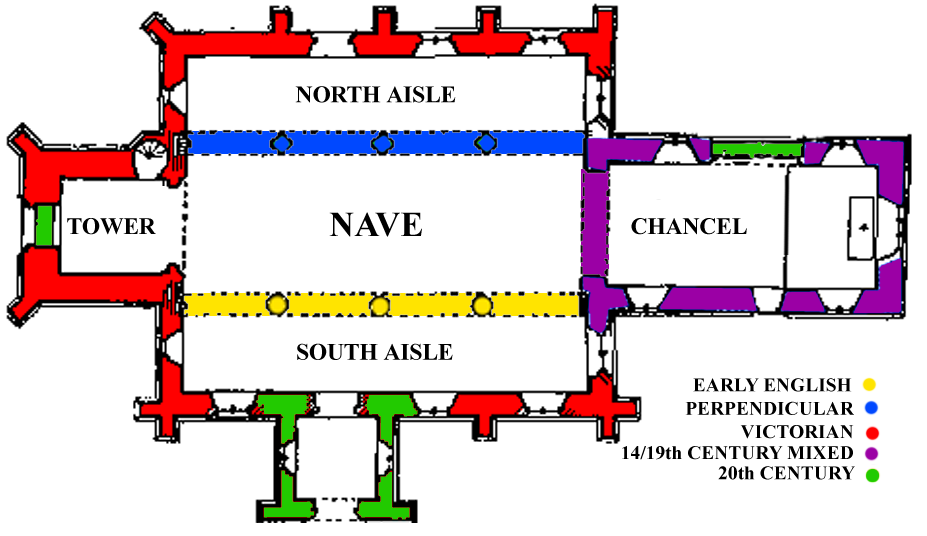
Floor plan, showing the different eras of architecture.

Over the years, items and material have been stolen from the church. Lead was taken from the roofs in 1956 and 1964. Since the church was declared redundant it has suffered from vandalism, with much of the stained glass and other fittings and furniture being damaged.

After being declared redundant, the church was used as a major location in the 1984 TV film "And the Wall Came Tumbling Down", an episode of Hammer House of Mystery and Suspense (known as Fox Mystery Theater in the U.S.).

It has been passed into the care of the charity the Friends of Friendless Churches. The charity holds a 999-year lease with effect from 24 June 1979.

The church's foundations have moved due to defective drainage, with the tower and the body of the church settling at different rates. There is also serious cracking in the chancel. The church has been examined by a structural engineer and by an architect, and their reports have been used to support an application for a grant towards repairs. The church is no longer on the Heritage at Risk Register. High-level repairs were completed to the tower and roofs in 2013.

The organ made by the Casson Positive Company is no longer present; it was given to St Barnabas' Church, Huntingdon.

A picture of the church appears on the cover of the book The Nation's Favourite Churches by Andrew Barr.
