= Presbyterian Church (disambiguation) =

The Presbyterian Church is a branch of Reformed Protestant Christianity originating in the British Isles.

Presbyterian Church may also refer to:

== United Kingdom ==
- Church of Scotland
- Presbyterian Church of Wales
- United Free Church of Scotland, a union of Presbyterian churches
- English Presbyterianism

== United States ==
- Presbyterian Church (USA), the largest Presbyterian denomination in the U.S.
- Presbyterian Church in America, the largest evangelical Presbyterian denomination in the U.S.

Specific places

- Presbyterian Church Building (Oxford, Indiana)
- Presbyterian Church (Bellevue, Nebraska)
- Presbyterian Church (Beaver, Oklahoma)

== See also ==
- List of Presbyterian churches
- List of Presbyterian and Reformed denominations in North America
- American Presbyterian Church (disambiguation)
- First Presbyterian Church (disambiguation)
- Old Presbyterian Church (disambiguation)
- Free Presbyterian Church (disambiguation)
- The Presbytere
