= St. Andrew's Catholic Church (Barnwell, South Carolina) =

Church in Barnwell, South Carolina, US

Coordinates: 33.2411°N 81.3620°W

St. Andrew's Catholic Church in Barnwell is the oldest church in Barnwell County, South Carolina. Originally built in 1831, it is oldest Catholic church in the state to have continually occupied the same building. Monthly mass began in 1847, and during the 1860s the church was one of few to not be destroyed during the American Civil War.

The church was made a memorial shrine in 1944, and in the early 1950s several extensions were added. Stained glass windows from an Ursuline convent were moved to St. Andrew's. Since then several further additions have been made, including a residence for the parish priest; further property has also been purchased. The rear of St. Andrew's is surrounded by a cemetery, which holds the graves of several prominent local figures.
