= American Presbyterian Church =

American Presbyterian Church may refer to:

- American Presbyterian Church, founded 1979, a denomination that separated from the Bible Presbyterian Church
- Presbyterian Church (USA), founded 1983, the largest contemporary national Presbyterian denomination
- Presbyterian Church in America, founded 1973, the second-largest contemporary national Presbyterian denomination
- Presbyterian Church in the United States (1861–1983), a denomination that was mainly active in the Southern and border states
- Presbyterian Church in the United States of America (1789–1958), the first national Presbyterian denomination
- Presbyterian Church of America, the former name of the Orthodox Presbyterian Church

== See also ==
- Presbyterianism in the United States
- List of Presbyterian and Reformed denominations in North America
- Category:Presbyterian denominations in North America
