= St Andrew's Church, Waterloo Street, Hove =

Coordinates: 50.8235°N 0.1571°W

St Andrew's Church
- St Andrew's Church, Brunswick Town, Hove
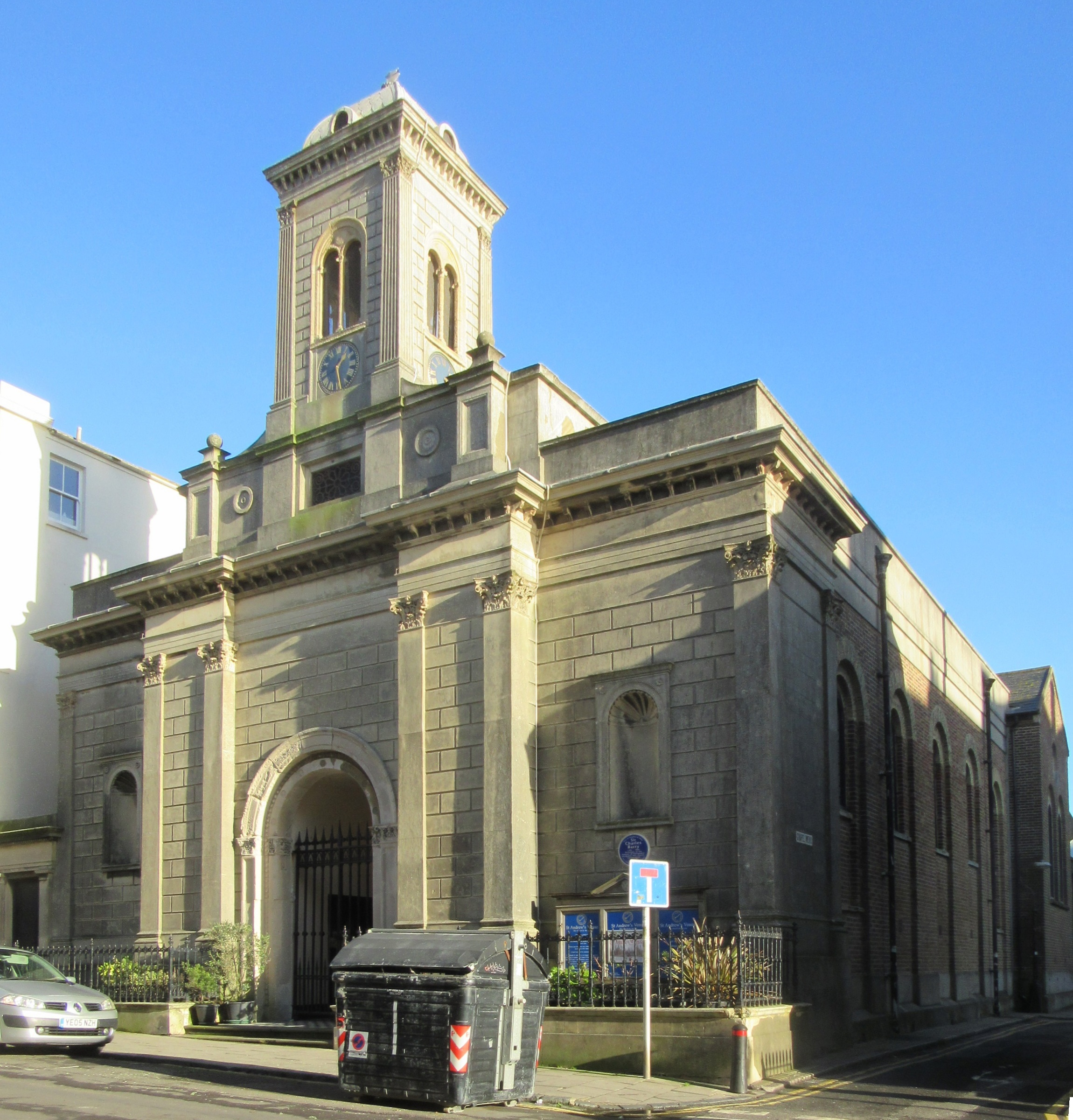
- St Andrew's Church
- Location: Waterloo Street, Hove, BN3 1AQ
- Country: England
- Denomination: Church of England
- Website: www.visitchurches.org.uk

History
- Founded: 1827
- Founder: Rev. Edward Everard
- Dedicated: 5 July 1828

Architecture
- Architect: Sir Charles Barry
- Style: Italianate
- Years built: 1827–1828
- Closed: 14 February 1990

Administration
- Diocese: Diocese of Chichester

Listed Building – Grade I
- Official name: Church of St Andrew Including Walls, Railings and Gates
- Designated: 24 March 1950
- Reference no.: 1298653

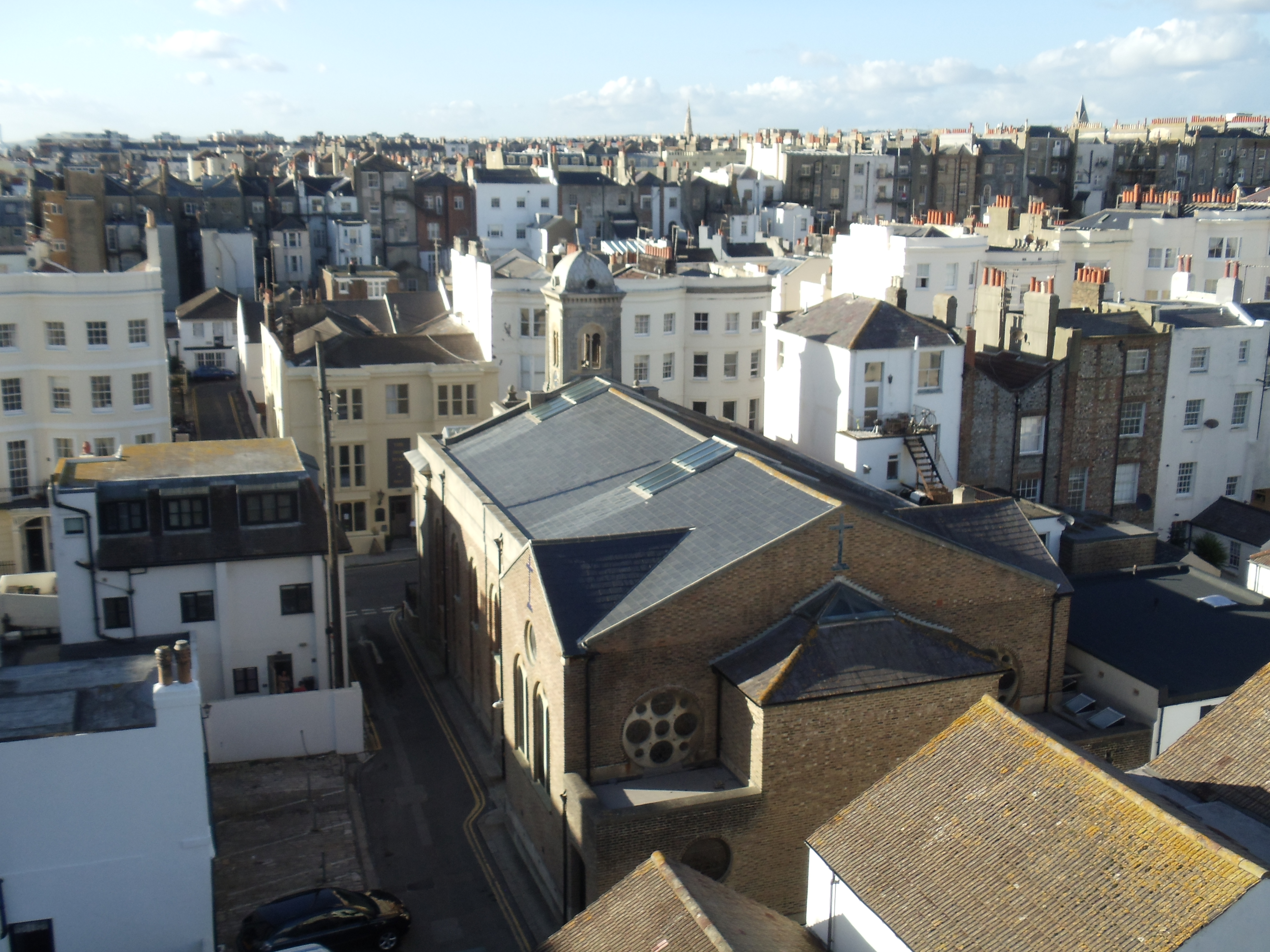
View of St Andrew's Church, Waterloo Street, Hove from above.

St Andrew's Church is a former Anglican church in the Brunswick Town area of Hove, part of the English city of Brighton and Hove. It is in the care of the Churches Conservation Trust, the national charity protecting historic churches at risk.

Although declared redundant in 1990, it was one of the area's most fashionable places of worship in the 19th century, when it was built to serve the wealthy residents of the Brunswick estate and surrounding areas. It is listed at Grade I, a designation used for buildings "of outstanding architectural or historic interest".

== History ==
The area between Brighton, to the east, and the ancient centre of Hove, to the west, was farmland until the 1820s, when Brunswick Town was developed in response to the success of the Kemp Town estate in Brighton—a planned estate of high-class houses, servants' quarters and other buildings, all in the Regency style. Architect Charles Busby planned and built the Brunswick Town estate, which (together with other nearby residential development) helped the population of Hove to rise from 100 in 1801 to 2,500 in 1841.

The only church nearby was St Andrew's, the ancient parish church; this was some distance away and had fallen into near-dereliction. The curate of the (now demolished) St Margaret's Church in Cannon Place, Brighton, Rev. Edward Everard, owned some land near the former Wick Farm, on which the Brunswick Town estate had been built. He was aware that there was no plan to build a church in the estate, so he decided to build a proprietary chapel on his land. Rev. Everard knew Charles Busby, but they had fallen out after a disagreement in 1824 over the commission for the Sussex County Hospital (now the Royal Sussex County Hospital) in Brighton: Everard was overruled by other members of the planning committee and had to break his promise that Busby would be allowed to design it. Therefore, Everard looked for a different architect to design and build the church, and Charles Barry—who had already built the hospital and St Peter's Church in Brighton—was chosen. The church has a blue plaque commemorating Barry.

Construction started in April 1827. Everard was granted an Act of Parliament on 3 April 1828 giving him and his successors ownership of the church, the right to appoint a curate for the next 40 years, and two-thirds of income from pew rents and other sources. Everard himself acted as the first curate, from the church's consecration on 5 July 1828 until 1838, one year before his death.

St Andrew's immediately became popular with the fashionable set, helped by the regular presence of members of the Royal Family and the aristocracy. Among the many Dukes and Duchesses to worship there in the mid-19th century was the elderly Prince Adolphus, Duke of Cambridge, who often made loud and sometimes eccentric comments and remarks during services. Between 300 and 350 people regularly worshipped at the church in 1851 according to a census taken during that year; there were 420 pews, 340 of which were subject to pew rents.

The interior was reordered in 1869, with new open benches installed in place of individual seats. A more radical change took place in 1882, when the church was extended at a cost of £7,000 (£2,000 to buy and demolish an adjacent stable block and £5,000 for the construction work); Charles Barry's son Edward Middleton Barry added a chancel, a sanctuary with Ionic columns, an illuminated dome and space for an organ. Although the organ is no longer in place, its case has been retained. A pulpit had been donated in 1918, and more additions were made in the 1920s, including enlargements to the altar case, a pedimented baldacchino above the altar, a marble font with its own baldacchino, new stained glass windows and new, clearer Venetian glass surrounding these. The changes cost £4,000. The stated intention was to brighten the interior of the church and "create a little piece of Italy" within the Italianate building.

The church remained in use until the late 20th century, but was declared redundant on 14 February 1990 because of declining attendance at services. The decline had set in several decades earlier, and the Diocese were considering demolition; the granting of Grade I-listed status on 24 March 1950 meant this could not happen. The Churches Conservation Trust now owns and maintains the building. Squatters caused damage during the 1990s, but restoration work in 2001 and 2002, costing more than £100,000, allowed the building to be reopened for occasional services, special events and community activities.

The church was always unparished, having been built as a chapel of ease to St Andrew's in Church Road.

Starting September 22, 2013 the Church has been used monthly as the venue for the Brighton and Hove Chapter of The Sunday Assembly.

== Architecture ==
The exterior, facing west, is the first example in England of the Italianate style being used on a church. Originally, the interior was less grand, with no chancel, simple pulpits and a single gallery, making it a plain, box-like preaching-house. The building materials used for the exterior are brick and ashlar. The entrance door is set beneath a round-headed arched opening between twin pilasters, the outer pair of which serve as quoins for the adjacent recessed walls. There is a small domed bell tower with a lead roof and clock faces, containing a bell cast in 1930 as a replacement for an early 19th-century predecessor (this bore an inscription dated 1811).

In its present form, the interior consists of a gallery at the west end, nave, transepts on two sides, a chancel, a side chapel in the southeast corner and a vestry in the northeast, with Italianate top-lighting and domes. The narthex, from where a stone staircase leads up to the gallery, is also top-lit, and now contains most of the church's memorial stones; these were moved there from the body of the church after it was declared redundant. Five, including memorials commemorating Lord Charles Somerset and Sir George Dallas, 1st Baronet, remain in the nave, however.

St Andrew's is the only church in Hove to have burial vaults beneath it. Space for burials was restricted in the Brunswick Town area by the time the church was built, because of the rapid residential development, and the churchyard at St Andrew's on Church Road was difficult to get to. Lord Charles Somerset, an M.P. who later became Governor of the Cape Colony in South Africa, was the first person to be buried in the vault, in 1831. A court order in 1854 prevented any more burials being made, and the vaults were used as air-raid shelters during World War II.

== See also ==
- Grade I listed buildings in Brighton and Hove
- List of churches preserved by the Churches Conservation Trust in Southeast England
- List of places of worship in Brighton and Hove

== Bibliography ==
- Brighton Polytechnic. School of Architecture and Interior Design (1987). A Guide to the Buildings of Brighton. Macclesfield: McMillan Martin. ISBN 1-869865-03-0.
- Dale, Antony (1989). Brighton Churches. London: Routledge. ISBN 0-415-00863-8.
- Middleton, Judy (2002). The Encyclopaedia of Hove & Portslade. Brighton: Brighton & Hove Libraries.
