= St. Andrew's Presbyterian Church (Kingston, Ontario) =

Coordinates: 44.232787°N 76.489571°W

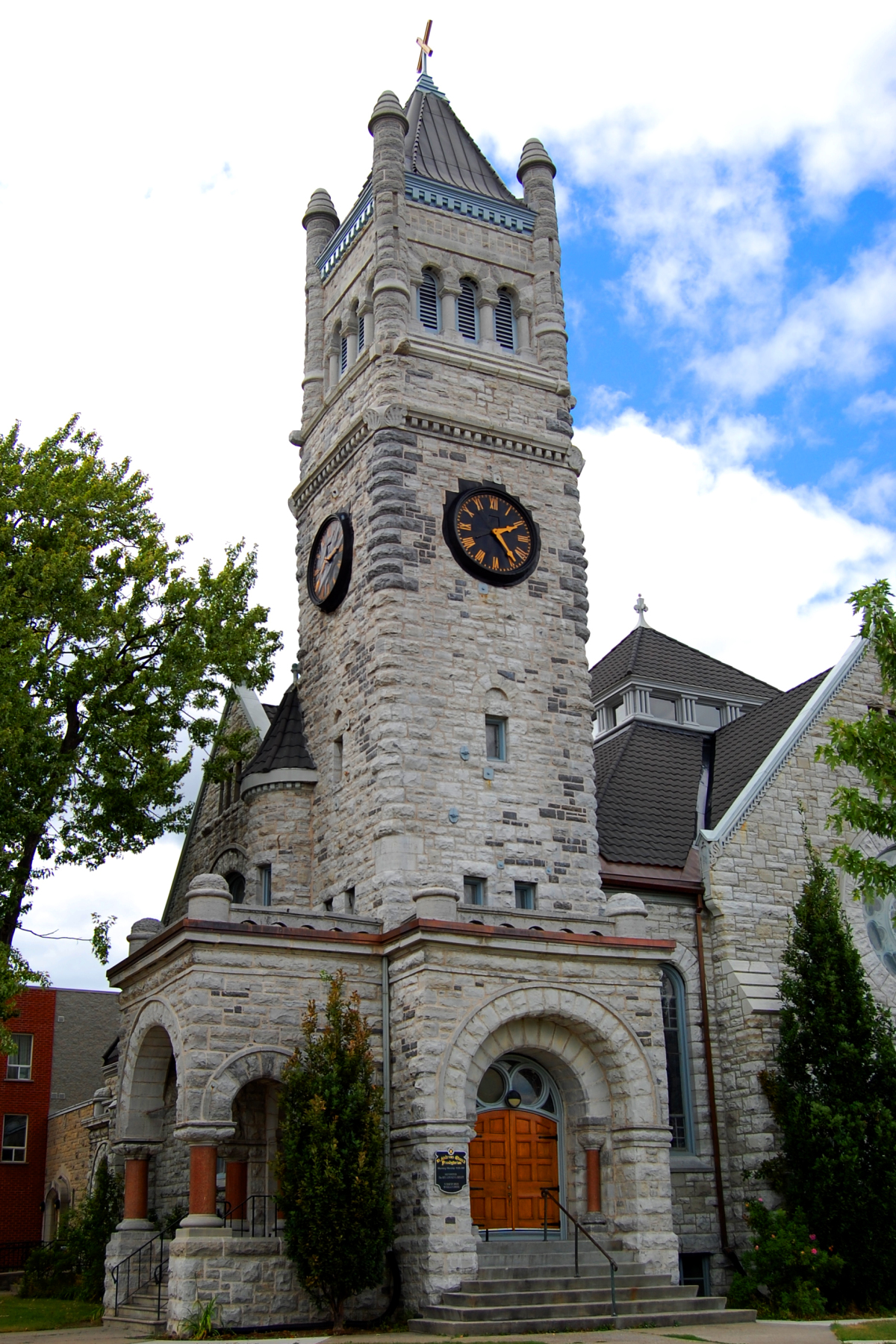
- St. Andrew's Church in Kingston, Ontario
- St. Andrew's Presbyterian Church
- Denomination: Presbyterian Church in Canada
- Website: http://www.StAndrewsKingston.org

History
- Dedication: St. Andrew

Administration
- Province: Canada
- Diocese: Presbyterian Diocese of Ontario
- Parish: Ontario

St. Andrew's Church is a Presbyterian Church in Kingston, Ontario. The church opened for service in 1822. St. Andrew's was the centre of Presbyterianism in Upper Canada, and the church was instrumental in the establishment of Queen's College, later to become Queen's University.

== History ==
Erected in the 1830s by United Empire Loyalists and Scottish immigrants on its current site, Princess St. at Clergy St., St. Andrew's Presbyterian was the first stone church in Kingston. Later renovations altered the classical Georgian lines of the structure, giving it a distinctly Italianate character. The original church was built on a pine ridge considered of little value, and was “irredeemably ugly” To preside over this new church, the Reverend John Barclay of Kettle, Scotland, was selected to serve as Minister.

Up until 1831, Presbyterian Churches in Canada had no governing body, but there was pressure to create one. On June 9, 1831, St Andrew’s Church hosted a meeting of ministers and elders from four presbyteries: Quebec, Glengarry, Bathurst, and York. The result of this meeting was the creation of “The Synod of the Presbyterian Church of Canada in connection with the Church of Scotland,” the forerunner to what is today the General Assembly of the Presbyterian Church in Canada.

In 1839 it was recognized that there was a need for an educational facility in Kingston to provide training for Presbyterian ministers. Accordingly, a motion was passed at St. Andrew’s that led to the founding of Queen’s University, now one of the top ranked universities in Canada. This motion was seconded by a young lawyer and member of the congregation, John Macdonald, who would become Sir John A. Macdonald, the first Prime Minister of Canada. The St. Andrew’s congregation was also instrumental in getting Queen's past the financial problems of its early years, with the second minister of St. Andrew’s, Reverend John Machar, serving as the unpaid president of this institution for seven years. In 1912 the formal connection between the university and church was severed, but many of the traditions at Queen's still have elements of its Scottish Presbyterian heritage.

On April 8, 1888, a fire sparked by the church furnace caused the structure to burn to the ground, leaving only the thick stone walls standing. These walls proved so sturdy that they had to be blown up to allow the new church to be built.

The current St. Andrews building was rebuilt in 1889, culminating with the impressive and handsome sanctuary, which can be seen today.

== Stained glass ==
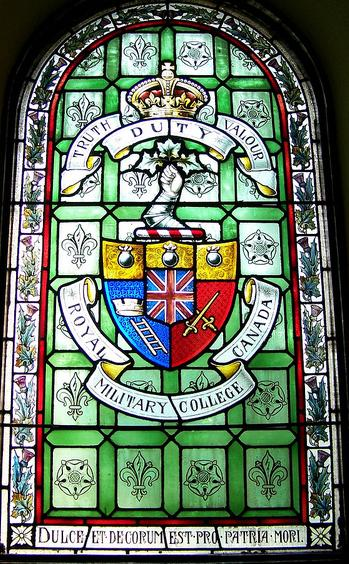
Royal Military College of Canada stained glass window at St. Andrew's Presbyterian Church (Kingston, Ontario)

St. Andrew's features many stained glass windows, many of them dating back to the building of the second church. These pieces were commissioned from Castle and Sons, a Montreal-based firm. Many were dedicated to the memory of prominent members of the congregation. One of the windows features the Arms of the Royal Military College of Canada and the line 'Dulce et decorum est pro patria mori'. It was funded by alumni and friends of the college. A companion window, in a similar style, 'to the glory of God and in immortal memory of officers, noncommissioned officers and men of the Royal Canadian Horse Artillery who fell in action the World's War 1914-18' and the text 'quo fas et glorius ducunt'.

The large south window, however, was paid for by the women’s home association. This window features one of the very few stories about St. Andrew in the bible, taken from John 12:20-26. In this story, a group of Greeks ask Andrew and Phillip if they would be able to meet with Jesus. In 1967, a smaller chapel was added on to the back of the sanctuary. This chapel contains nine stained glass windows featuring the life and acts of Jesus.

== St. Andrew's Church today ==
St Andrew's church stands today in the heart of downtown Kingston, Ontario. Home today to a church population of around 100–150, St. Andrews plays an active role in the Kingston community.

The Special Meals program at St. Andrew's is the best example of the church's community involvement. This initiative commenced in January 1987, and is still running. Special Meals is a volunteer program that runs every Sunday to provide food for those in need.

In the summer of 2009, St. Andrew's applied to the federal government for a grant to begin a tour guide program at the church. This program has attracted almost 1,000 people in 2009. In 2010, the tours brought in 1,732 visitors. Tours were also run in 2011 and 2012, and brought in 1,371 and 1,908 visitors respectively.
