= St Andrew's Presbyterian Church, Esk =

St Andrew's Presbyterian Church (former)
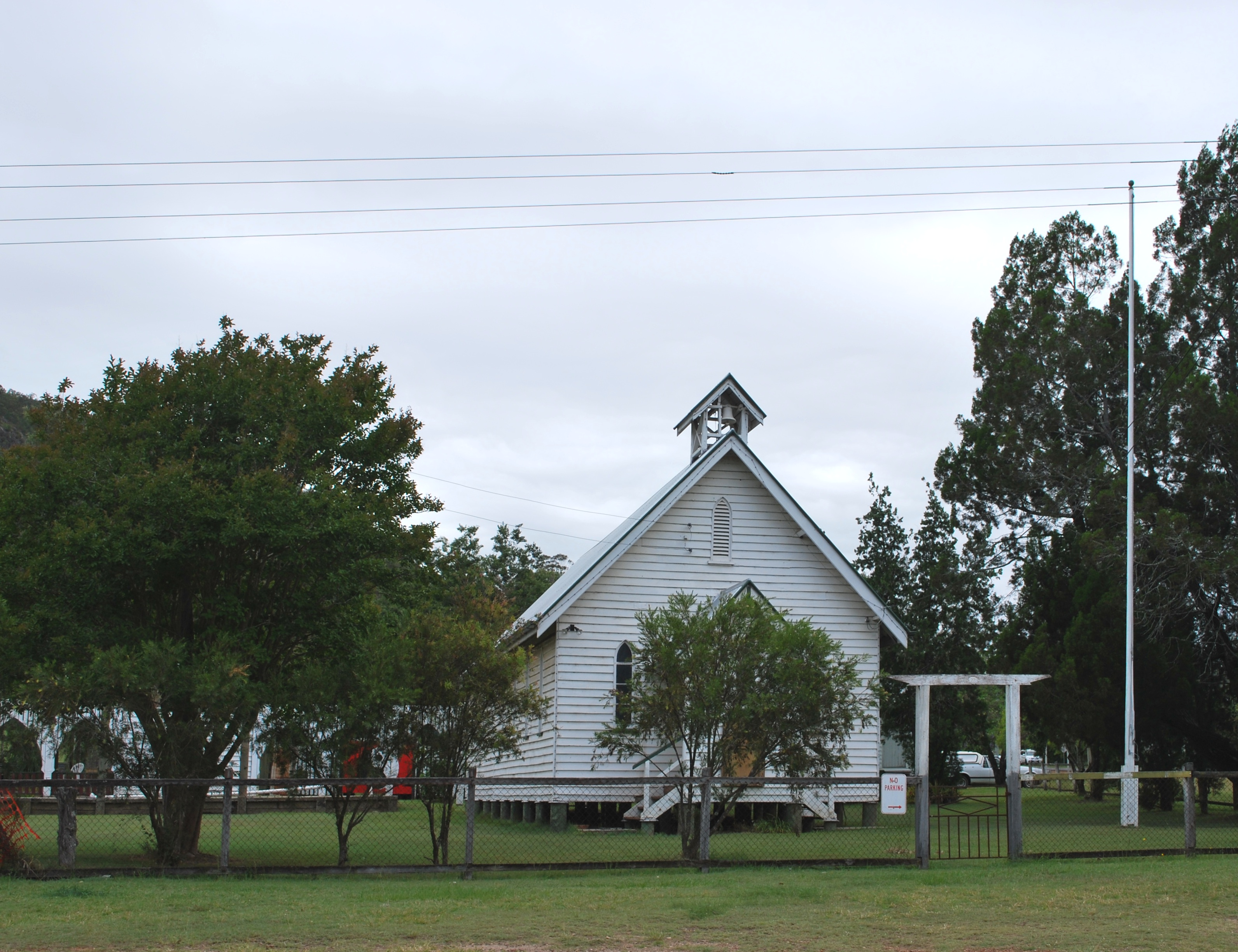
- The former St Andrew's Presbyterian Church, 2010
- St Andrew's Presbyterian Church (former)
- 27°14′34″S 152°25′31″E
- Address: Ipswich Street, Esk, Somerset Region, Queensland
- Country: Australia
- Previous denomination: Presbyterian (1875–1977); Union Church (concurrently); Continuing Presbyterian Church (1977–c. 2001)

History
- Status: Church (former)
- Founded: 1875
- Founder(s): David and Mary McConnel
- Dedication: Andrew the Apostle
- Dedicated: 12 February 1876

Architecture
- Functional status: Closed and sold
- Architectural type: Church (former)
- Years built: 1876–1929
- Closed: c. 2001

Specifications
- Materials: Timber

Queensland Heritage Register
- Official name: St Andrews Presbyterian Church (former)
- Type: State heritage (landscape, built)
- Designated: 11 June 2003
- Reference no.: 602408
- Significant period: 1870s (historical); 1870s (fabric) ongoing (social)
- Significant components: Church hall/sunday school hall, views to, church, garden/grounds, tower – bell / belfry

St Andrew's Presbyterian Church is a heritage-listed former Presbyterian church at Ipswich Street, Esk, Somerset Region, Queensland, Australia. The former church was built from 1876 to 1929, and it was added to the Queensland Heritage Register on 11 June 2003.

Following the 1977 Basis of Union that formed the Uniting Church, the congregation remained affiliated with the Continuing Presbyterian Church who closed the Esk church in c. 2001 and sold the former church building in May 2023.

== History ==
The former St Andrew's Presbyterian Church is a simple timber building located on the south bank of Sandy Creek and was built in 1876 on the first site of the new settlement at Esk. The former church site also contains a timber church hall and a manse.

=== Early Presbyterianism in the area ===
The town of Esk stands on the former Mount Esk pastoral run which was taken up in 1842 by Gideon Scot and purchased by the Bigge family of Mount Brisbane run in 1849. European settlement began with a teamsters' camp at the crossing of Sandy (or Esk) Creek and the coach road north. This road became the main North Road from Ipswich to the Burnett. A township site was surveyed in 1872 on land excised from Mount Esk run and the first building known to have been constructed there was a hotel.

In 1873, stimulated by a copper mining boom at nearby Biarra, plans for a township were lodged and a postal receiving office opened. The township was officially named "Gallanani", though more commonly called Sandy Creek or Mount Esk, and quickly developed to include a range of government and commercial buildings and houses. David and Mary McConnel of Cressbrook, two of the first European settlers in the Brisbane Valley, donated 8.1 hectares (20 acres) of land for the construction of a Presbyterian Church to mark their silver wedding anniversary. They purchased, cleared and fenced the land. Mary McConnel, in particular, was a staunch Presbyterian and she and her family encouraged the establishment and support of other churches in the Valley. Alexander Raff, Bigge's financial manager, and other local graziers donated money towards the building of St Andrew's. The gift of land and capital for the establishment of a church by local pastoralists reflects the relationship between early pastoral stations and the local settlements that served and traded with them reflecting a landowner and village pattern inherited from Europe.

=== Construction of the church building ===
The land for the new church was in a choice position, being at the corner of Ipswich and Middle Streets in the commercial centre of the new township and close to the Sandy Creek crossing. A church was built to hold a congregation of 120 and a timber manse was also constructed. The former church was built in 1875 and on 12 February 1876 the Reverend David Watt, who had travelled from Scotland to serve as minister, conducted the first recorded service at St Andrew's. As it was the first church to be built in the area, it served at first as a Union Church accommodating all denominations. The area developed quickly and within five years had five separate preaching areas and was 40 miles (64 km) long.

In 1884, two sawmills were opened and in 1886 the Brisbane Valley railway reached Esk, though it was located away from the established settlement. In time the commercial centre of town shifted to be closer to the railway station and yards. Most buildings moved to the northern bank of Sandy Creek or were built there, including the Roman Catholic (1884/1905) and Anglican (1889) churches. The Methodist church built on the south side was moved to Toogoolawah in 1906 and the current church is on the northern side of the creek. Now only the church, school and some houses survive marking the first settlement on the southern bank of Sandy Creek. Later churches were built on the opposite bank, nearer to the later settlement.

Although the 1890s were a hard time for Esk due to flooding and the general financial recession of that decade, the 1900s were a period of growth. Dairying in the area expanded and a butter factory was built. In 1900 the church and manse were renovated and by 1908 the Sunday school had an enrolment of 91 pupils and a Women's Guild was formed. Around this time the population passed 600. In 1913, the town was officially renamed Esk.

=== Subsequent improvements ===
The date of construction of the timber church hall is unknown, but by 1929 there was a hall in existence on the site that was used as a Sunday school and for a variety of social activities. It is locally believed that the building was formerly the billiard room of the Commercial Hotel in Esk. It has been extended at the eastern end. The manse was sold for removal in 1947 and a replacement building was constructed in 1948. In 1951 the land to Main Street was sold.

The former church was considerably extended at the eastern end, almost doubling its capacity and suggesting a marked increase in the congregation. The extension can clearly be traced in joints to the walls and in the floorboards.

The former church is now privately owned and the altar has been removed.

On 17 March 2020 the owners of the property applied to remove the former church from the Queensland Heritage Register.

== Description ==
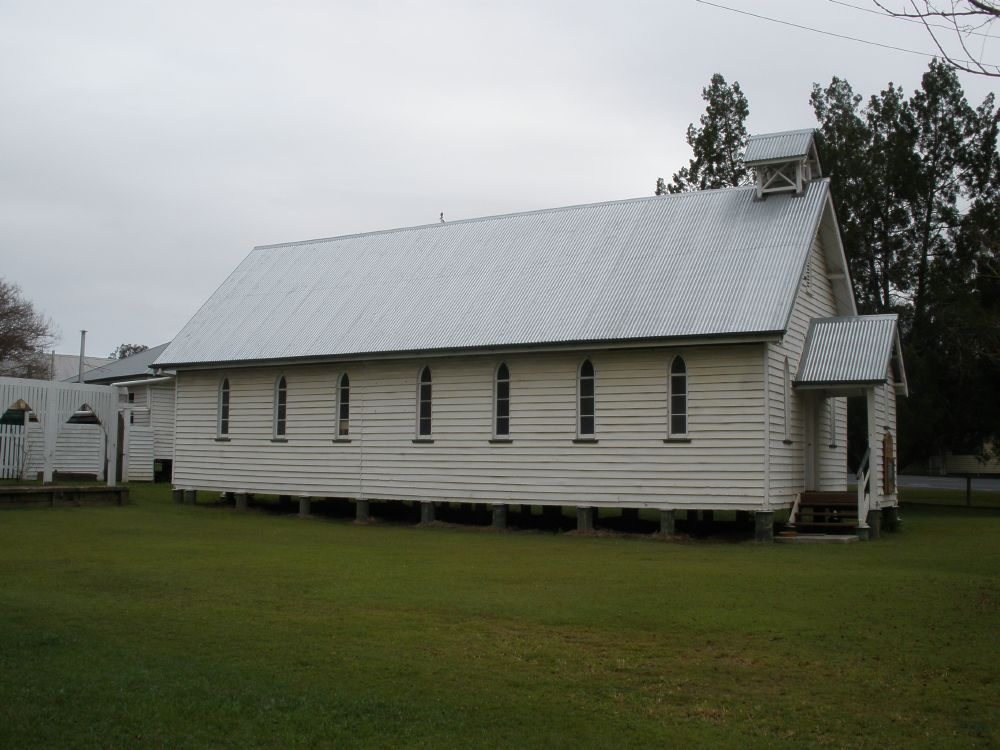
The former St Andrew's Presbyterian Church, side view

The former St Andrew's Church is a rectangular timber building set on low stumps and stands on a prominent site on the main Brisbane Valley Highway facing Middle Street. The hall is on the northern part of the site also facing Middle Street. There is a garage and an outhouse behind the hall. The manse stands to the west side of the complex facing the Brisbane Valley Highway (formerly known as Ipswich Road). The site is grassed and fenced with a plain timber and wire fence and there is a gate connecting the manse garden to the church site.

The former church is a landmark driving southwards out of Esk because of its location immediately opposite the crossing and its plain but distinctive form. Driving into town from the south, it is the first church in a fine precinct of historical timber churches, associated buildings, and mature trees on both sides of the creek crossing.

The former church has a central porch with a scalloped bargeboard and lancet windows reached by timber steps to each side. The body of the church is lit by lancet windows and there are lancet windows flanking the porch and a louvred lancet high under the roof. This is gabled and clad in corrugated iron sheeting with a belfry on the roof ridge. The former church has wide diagonal beaded boards on eaves, soffit and doors.

Scissor trusses support the roof and the ceiling is lined with diagonal beaded boarding. The walls are lined with horizontal beaded boards and clearly shows the evidence of extension. The sanctuary is one step up from the body of the church and there is a vestry behind the altar area. The altar has been removed, but the building currently retains the rail and lectern and simple painted pews. There is an honour board.

The church hall is a smaller building, also of weatherboard, with a gabled roof clad in corrugated iron. It has a porch and narrow rectangular windows shaded with hoods. The rear has been extended with part of a building, possibly recycled from elsewhere and incorporating a verandah and a large fixed window. This rear section, which does not contain windows along the side, may be the recycled billiard hall of local memory. The interior of the main room of the hall is lined with fibrous cement sheeting and cover strips. The floor is of narrow tongue and groove boards.

There is a weatherboard garage with a gabled roof behind the hall.

The manse is located at the corner of the black facing Ipswich Street. It is a weatherboard building on low stumps with a hipped corrugated iron roof. The windows are casements with horizontal glazing bars and there is a small porch.

== Heritage listing ==
The former St Andrew's Presbyterian Church was listed on the Queensland Heritage Register on 11 June 2003 having satisfied the following criteria.

The place is important in demonstrating the evolution or pattern of Queensland's history.

The former St Andrew's Church is associated with the early development of the Brisbane Valley and of Esk in particular. It was constructed in 1875 on land donated by the McConnel family, important early pastoralists in the district, and was built with financial assistance from the McConnels and other local landholders. Its location indicates the position of the first township at a dray route and near a river crossing before the arrival of the railway in 1886 caused a relocation of the town centre. Being the first church in Esk, its initial use as a Union church demonstrates cooperation between different denominations common in the early stages of establishing townships. The extension carried out to accommodate an expanding congregation also reflects the development of Esk.

The place is important in demonstrating the principal characteristics of a particular class of cultural places.

The former St Andrew's Church is a good example of the type of simple timber church that served many new settlements as their first church, and was adapted for continuing use.

The place is important because of its aesthetic significance.

The position of the former church on a prominent site at the entry to the town makes it an important landmark and in its form, scale and detail the church makes a makes an important contribution to the built character of Esk

The place has a strong or special association with a particular community or cultural group for social, cultural or spiritual reasons.

The former St Andrew's Church has a long association with the people of Esk and the surrounding district, being a place of worship and social focus for over 125 years until its closure.

The place has a special association with the life or work of a particular person, group or organisation of importance in Queensland's history.

It is also important for its connection with the McConnels of Cressbrook, notable as benefactors of the former church.
