= St Andrew's Church, Church Road, Hove =

Coordinates: 50.8286°N 0.1750°W

St Andrew (Old Church), Hove
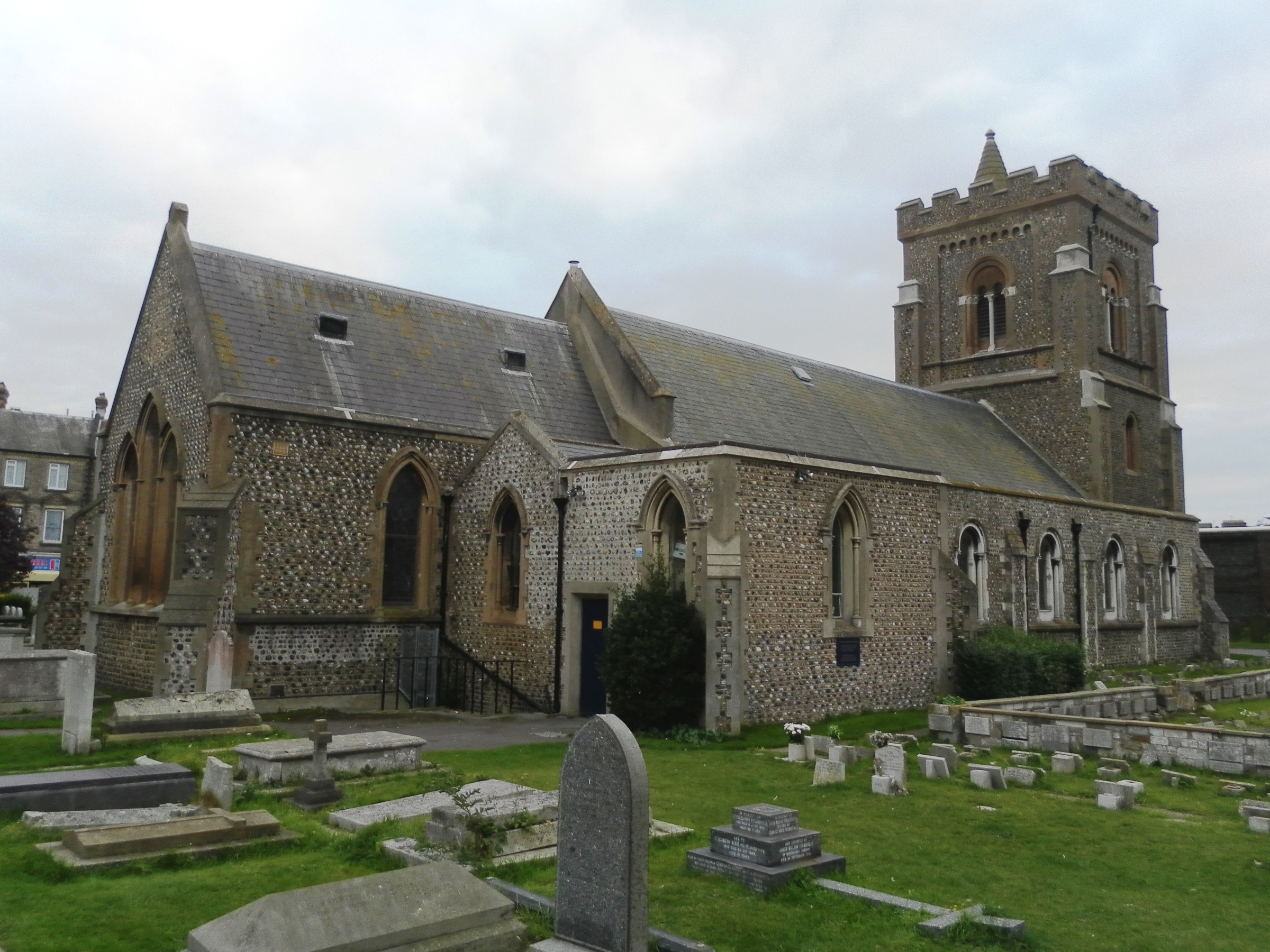
- The church from the northeast
- St Andrew (Old Church), Hove
- Denomination: Church of England
- Churchmanship: Broad Church

History
- Dedication: Saint Andrew

Administration
- Province: Canterbury
- Diocese: Chichester
- Archdeaconry: Brighton and Lewes
- Deanery: Hove
- Parish: Hove, St Andrew (Old Church)

Clergy
- Vicar: The Revd Dan Henderson

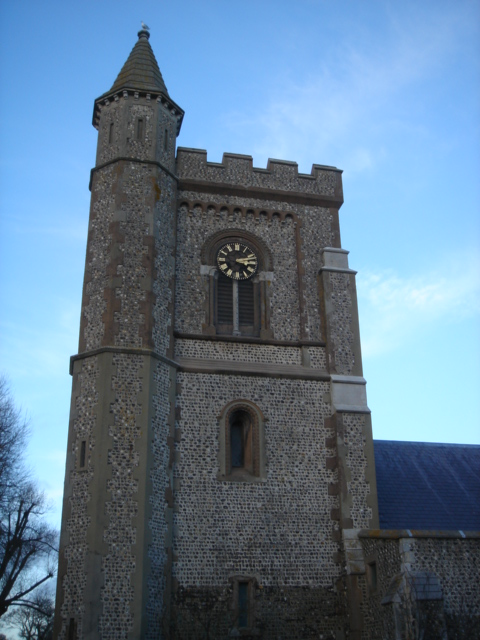
The square tower at the western end of the church.

St Andrew's Church is an Anglican church in Church Road, Hove, in the English city of Brighton and Hove. It is usually referred to as St Andrew (Old Church) to distinguish it from another St Andrew's Church in Waterloo Street, elsewhere in Hove. It served as Hove's parish church for several centuries until 1892, although the building was in a state of near-ruin until Hove began to grow from an isolated village to a popular residential area in the early 19th century.

== History ==
Hove developed independently of, and separately from, neighbouring Brighton, beginning as a linear village along a single street, now known as Hove Street, running from north to south. A church was established in mediaeval times, possibly around the 12th century, at an isolated location in fields to the northeast of the village; access was only possible from the west. The original building was replaced with a simple Norman-style church with an aisled nave and a tower. By the 13th century a chancel had been added. This church functioned as the parish church of Hove until 1531, when the parish was united with that of Preston (to the northeast) and became the parish of Hove-cum-Preston. Although its parish church status remained, a declining population was unable to maintain it. By the 18th century the nave and chancel were crumbling; parts of the roof were removed; and the tower fell down in 1801.

The church's fortunes changed with the development of the Brunswick estate and other residential areas around the old village in the early 19th century. At this time, Brighton had expanded to the boundary between its own parish and that of Hove-cum-Preston, so any more development would fall within Hove; as a result, Hove's population rose from 100 in 1801 to 2,500 by 1841. By 1871 it was to reach 11,000, as most of the available land west of the boundary was systematically built on. Construction of the Brunswick estate began in 1824 and St Andrew's Church in Waterloo Street was built to serve it in 1828 (as a chapel of ease).

A different kind of change in the church's fortunes came about following formation of The Brighton General Gas Light Company in 1825. Although production of coal gas was notorious for the smell it produced, the company acquired a two-acre site in the fields between Hove Street and St. Andrew's Church, and in 1832 built a gasworks there. The process required substantial tonnage of coal, delivered by horse-drawn cart on the unmade tracks in the vicinity, and removal of by-products including coke, coal tar, sulphur and ammonia. This industrial site with tall chimney and two gasometers next to the churchyard was a considerable intrusion on the populace of Hove. By 1861 the site had doubled in size and there were now five gasometers, ranging in size from small to large. Due to spiralling demand a large new works was opened in Shoreham Harbour at Portslade-by-Sea in 1871, and by 1885 all gas manufacture in Brighton and Hove had been transferred there. The Hove site, in a by now primarily residential area, was then used for storage only.

Due to the increases in population parish officials realised that a rebuilding of the original St Andrew's would be needed to provide enough capacity. A meeting was held at a nearby public house on 14 September 1833 to propose its restoration. The following week, a vote was taken on whether to demolish it instead and rebuild it on a new, more accessible site; the parish decided against this.

Architect George Basevi was asked to assess how much the reconstruction would cost. He quoted £1,870 exclusive of internal fittings and his fee, both of which were just over £50 His father, a Brunswick estate resident, ultimately paid the latter. The parish borrowed £2,000, and rebuilding commenced in 1834. London-based building firm Butler & Green carried out the construction work to Basevi's design. The budget for the construction work was tight. This caused some friction between the clerk of works and Butler. Basevi acknowledged to the Church Building Committee that he had requested some additional changes that had not been budgeted for. Butler finally accepted an amount substantially less than he had originally claimed for the work. The overspend was on the churchyard and its walls that were not completed until 1837.

St Andrew's was reopened on 18 July 1836, with a seating capacity of 430. 80 seats were subject to pew rents. A 200-seat extension, in the form of a gallery at the west end, was added in 1839. Rev. Walter Kelly, vicar since 1834 retired in 1878, when the united parish was split again into the Parish of Hove and the Parish of Preston. At this point, St Andrew's became once again the parish church of Hove. However, the new vicar, Rev. Thomas Peacey, wanted to build a new parish church; this happened in 1892 with the construction of All Saints Church, and St Andrew's became a chapel of ease to All Saints until it gained its own parish in 1957. The parish covers an established residential area centred on the Hove Street/Church Road crossroads.

Local maps show that in 1844 the church was centred inside a roughly square site, probably less than two acres in area. By 1873 the northern boundary had moved as far as the residential development in Monmouth Street (now demolished) the churchyard being a long rectangle with an area several times that of the original site.

The churchyard was cut down in size twice, destroying historic graves. In 1880, Church Road was widened, cutting ten feet from the southern side (an Act of Parliament was used to compulsorily purchase the land) In 1972, East Sussex County Council took much of the land on the northern side to build a school. Other graves were destroyed when the parish hall was built in one corner of the grounds.

== Architecture and fixtures ==
Dating from 1834, just before the time when the Early English style became the dominant force in ecclesiastical architecture locally and elsewhere, St Andrew's Church was designed in an unusual style which has been described as "Neo-Norman". This refers to a revival of the original Norman architecture of the 11th and 12th centuries. Although the whole of the exterior was rebuilt, some original Norman-era parts were retained inside, and possibly influenced George Basevi's design decision. A series of round columns, pointed arcade arches and parts of the roof survive from the mediaeval era. The box-pews and pulpit were replaced in 1879, when internal restoration work was carried out. A new font was installed in 1865. In 1953 a lychgate was installed in the southern face of the church.

== Graves and memorials ==
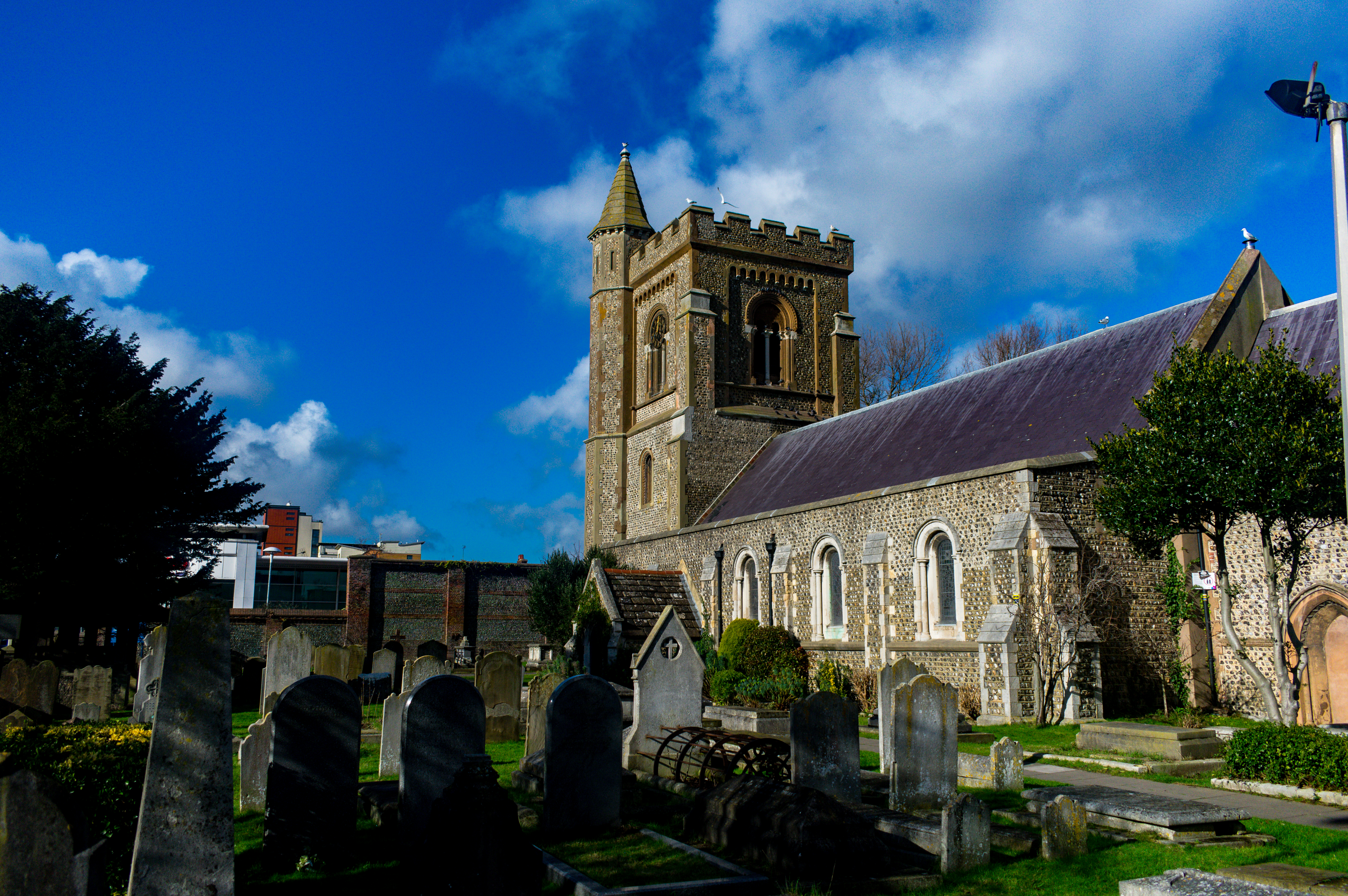
Westward view across the churchyard. Sir George Everest's headstone is the fourth from the left in the foreground; next to it on the left is his sister's headstone.

Many notable people have been buried at St Andrew's Church, although not all graves survive; and other people are commemorated by memorial tablets inside the church.

The watercolour artist Copley Fielding, who lived in Hove in his later years, was buried in a tomb in the northeast corner of the churchyard after his death in nearby Worthing in 1855. There is a memorial tablet in the south aisle. The Vallances, Lords of the Manor of Hove for 150 years, have their family vault outside the chancel. Their name is also commemorated by two streets within the parish, Vallance Road and Vallance Gardens; and the wider area was originally known locally as the Vallance Estate. The family of George Basevi, the church's architect, also have a vault and memorial stone inside the church—however, although his father, mother and sister were buried in it, George Basevi himself was buried at Ely Cathedral, where he died after falling from one of the towers. Brighton architect Charles Busby, who had been responsible for many churches in Brighton and Hove, was buried in the churchyard, but his tomb was removed when Church Road was widened in 1880.

Rev. Walter Kelly, who died in 1887 nine years after leaving office as vicar of Hove-cum-Preston, was buried in a tomb in the churchyard, and has a memorial stone in the chancel—it is the only memorial in that part of the church. Rev. Thomas Rooper, vicar of the other St Andrew's Church at Waterloo Street in the 1850s and 1860s, is commemorated by a wall tablet; next to it is a memorial for his son Major Edward Rooper, who died in the Crimean War. The tomb of the Elliott family, another prominent Anglican family from Brighton, is in the churchyard. Charlotte Elliott, the hymn writer, and her brothers Rev. Henry Venn Elliott and Rev. Edward Bishop Elliott (associated with the curacies of St Mary the Virgin Church and St Mark's Church respectively) are all buried there. Rev. Dr James O'Brien, the first incumbent at St Patrick's Church in nearby Cambridge Road, is also commemorated nearby.

One man whose name is internationally famous is also buried in a grave on the south side of the church. Sir George Everest, the geographer who undertook the Great Trigonometric Survey in India while acting as Surveyor-General, was the first person to determine the exact height of the world's highest mountain, which was then named after him. He died in London in December 1866 and was buried with his two children, sister and father-in-law. However, Sir George himself had no connection with Hove or Brighton at any time during his life, and none of the family members buried at the church were known to be associated with it.

George Augustus Westphal was the last surviving naval officer who served on HMS Victory at the Battle of Trafalgar in 1805. He is buried in the churchyard, and there is a plaque in his name inside the church. Another Trafalgar veteran, Rear-Admiral Sir John Hindmarsh KH RN, the first Governor of South Australia, lies here too. There are also Commonwealth War Graves Commission special memorials to a North Staffordshire Regiment officer of World War I and a Royal Air Force officer of World War II.

== The church today ==
St Andrew's Church is a Grade II* listed building. As of February 2001, it was one of 70 Grade II*-listed buildings and structures, and 1,218 listed buildings of all grades, in the city of Brighton and Hove.

There are Morning and Evening Prayer services every day, two services of the Eucharist on Sunday mornings, and other regular celebrations of Holy Communion. There are children's and youth facilities, including a Sunday school.

== See also ==
- Grade II* listed buildings in Brighton and Hove
- List of places of worship in Brighton and Hove

== Bibliography ==
- Berry, Sue (2011). Barber, Luke (ed.). "The impact of the Georgians, Victorians and Edwardians on early parish churches: City of Brighton and Hove c. 1680-1914)". Sussex Archaeological Collections. 149. Lewes: Sussex Archaeological Society: 199–220. doi:10.5284/1086632. ISSN 0143-8204.
- Dale, Antony (1989), Brighton Churches, London: Routledge, ISBN 0-415-00863-8
