= List of churches in the Diocese of Toledo, Ohio =

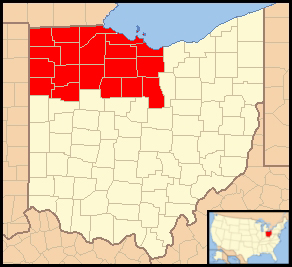
Diocese of Toledo in red

This is a list of current and former Roman Catholic churches in the Roman Catholic Diocese of Toledo. The diocese covers 19 counties in northwestern Ohio and includes the cities of Toledo and Sandusky. The cathedral church of the diocese is the Our Lady, Queen of the Most Holy Rosary Cathedral in Toledo.

== Toledo ==
Name	Image	Location	Description/notes
Our Lady, Queen of the Most Holy Rosary Cathedral		2535 Collingwood Blvd, Toledo	Spanish Plateresque style church completed 1931
Christ the King		4100 Harvest Ln, Toledo	
Corpus Christi		2955 Dorr St, Toledo	University of Toledo
Gesu		2049 Parkside Blvd, Toledo	
Good Shepherd		550 Clark St, Toledo	Closed
Immaculate Conception		434 Eastern Ave, Toledo	
Little Flower		5522 Dorr St, Toledo	
Most Blessed Sacrament		2240 Castlewood Dr, Toledo	
Our Lady of Lourdes		6149 Hill Ave, Toledo	
Our Lady of Perpetual Help		2255 Central Grove, Toledo	
Regina Coeli		530 Regina Pkwy, Toledo	
Sacred Heart of Jesus		509 Oswald St, Toledo	Part of Epiphany of the Lord Parish
Ss. Adalbert and Hedwig		3233 Lagrange St, Toledo	St. Hedwig Campus closed in 2017
St. Catherine of Siena		4555 N Haven Ave, Toledo	
St. Charles Borromeo		1842 Airport Hwy, Toledo	
St. Clement		3030 Tremainsville Rd, Toledo	
St. Francis de Sales Chapel		501 Cherry St, Toledo	
St. Hyacinth		719 Evesham Ave, Toledo	
St. Joan of Arc		5856 Heatherdowns Ave, Toledo	
St. John the Baptist		5153 N Summit St, Toledo	
St. Joseph		628 Locust St, Toledo	
St. Martin de Porres		1119 Bancroft St, Toledo	Listed on the National Register of Historic Places (NRHP) as St. Ann Roman Catholic Church Complex
St. Michael the Archangel		420 Sandusky St, Toledo	
St. Patrick Historic		130 Avondale Ave, Toledo	Built 1901; listed on NRHP
St. Patrick Heatherdowns		4201 Heatherdowns Blvd, Toledo	
Ss. Peter and Paul		728 S St. Clair St, Toledo	
St. Pius X		2950 Ilger Ave, Toledo	
St. Stephen		1880 Genesee St, Toledo	Part of Epiphany of the Lord Parish
St. Thomas Aquinas		729 White St, Toledo	Part of Epiphany of the Lord Parish

== Sandusky ==
Name	Image	Location	Description/notes
Holy Angels		Sandusky	
St. Mary		429 Central Ave, Sandusky	
Ss. Peter and Paul		Sandusky	Built 1865; listed on NRHP

== Other areas ==
Name	Image	Location	Description/notes
Sacred Heart of Jesus		Bethlehem	Listed on NRHP
Basilica and National Shrine of Our Lady of Consolation		Carey	
St. Michael's Ridge		Defiance	
St. John		110 N Franklin St, Delphos	Listed on NRHP
St. John the Baptist		OH 694 and Main St, Glandorf	Listed on NRHP
Saint Mary		Kirby	One of three sites in Transfiguration of the Lord Parish
St. Peter		60 S Mulberry St, Mansfield	Listed on NRHP
St. Augustine		210 E Clinton St, Napoleon	Listed on NRHP
All Saints		N Perry St, New Riegel	Listed on NRHP
Saint Joseph		Salem Township, Wyandot County	One of three sites in Transfiguration of the Lord Parish
Most Pure Heart Of Mary		Shelby	Built 1924; listed on NRHP
Saint Peter		Upper Sandusky	Built in 1874; one of three sites in Transfiguration of the Lord Parish
