= Narthex =

Architectural component of basilicas and churches

Plan of a Western Christian cathedral, with the narthex in the shaded area at the western end.

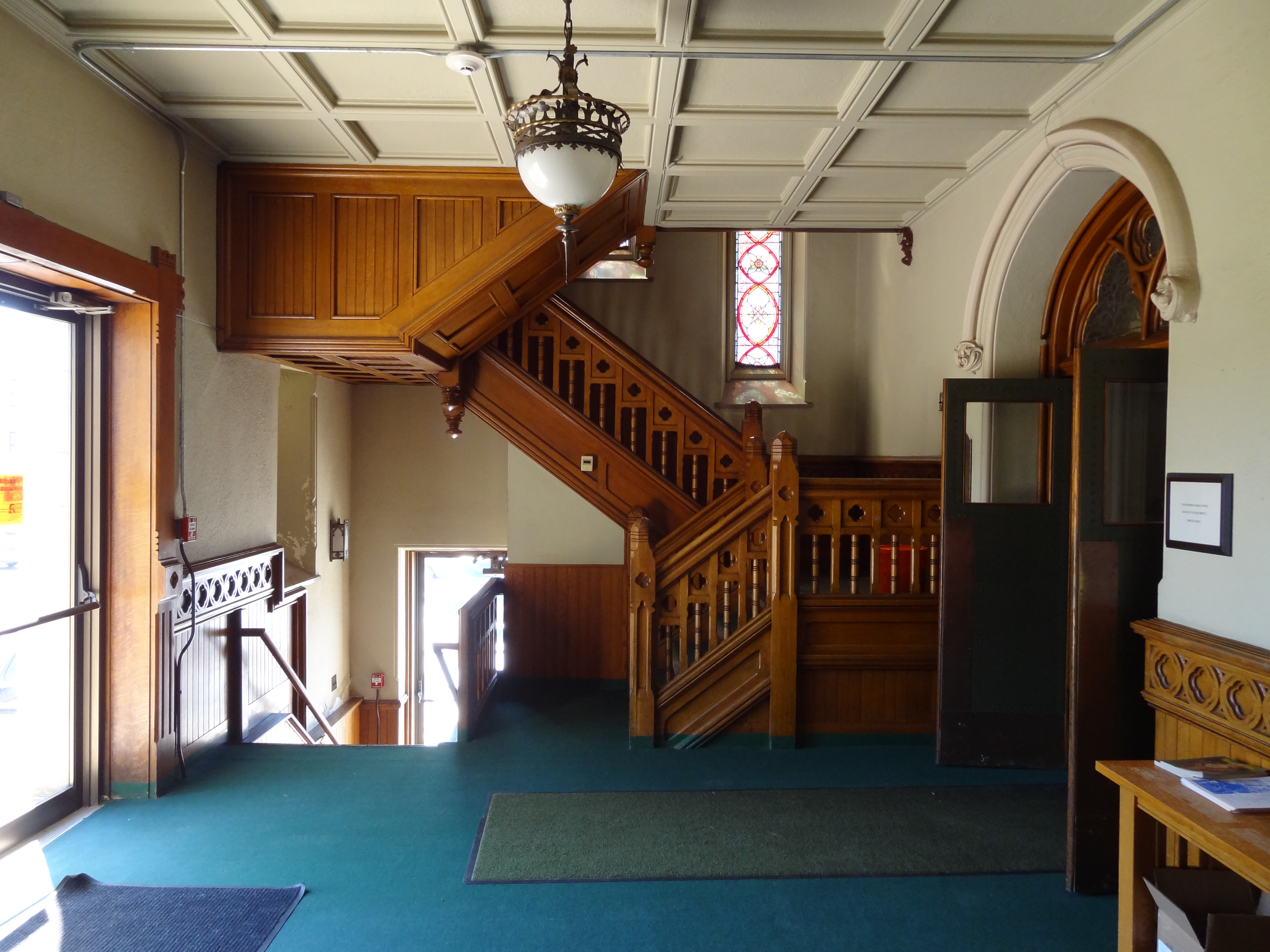
The narthex of St. Patrick's Church in Lowell, Massachusetts. The entrance to the church building itself, along with the entrance to the nave, is visible in this photograph.

The narthex is an architectural element in Christian churches consisting of the area reached after opening the church doors; one or three doors in the narthex then open into the nave of the church.

The narthex in the floor plans of Christian churches dates back to early Christian and Byzantine basilicas and churches, which consisted of the narthex (entrance or vestibule), located at the west end of the nave, opposite the church's main altar. In early Christian churches the narthex was often divided into two distinct parts: an esonarthex (inner narthex) between the west wall and the body of the church proper, separated from the nave and aisles by a wall, arcade, colonnade, screen, or rail, and an external closed space, the exonarthex (outer narthex), a court in front of the church façade delimited on all sides by a colonnade as in the first St. Peter's Basilica in Rome or in the Basilica of Sant'Ambrogio in Milan. The exonarthex may have been either open or enclosed with a door leading to the outside, as in the Byzantine Chora Church.

The area outside the entrance of the church (which leads into the narthex) may include a covered porch.

== Etymology ==
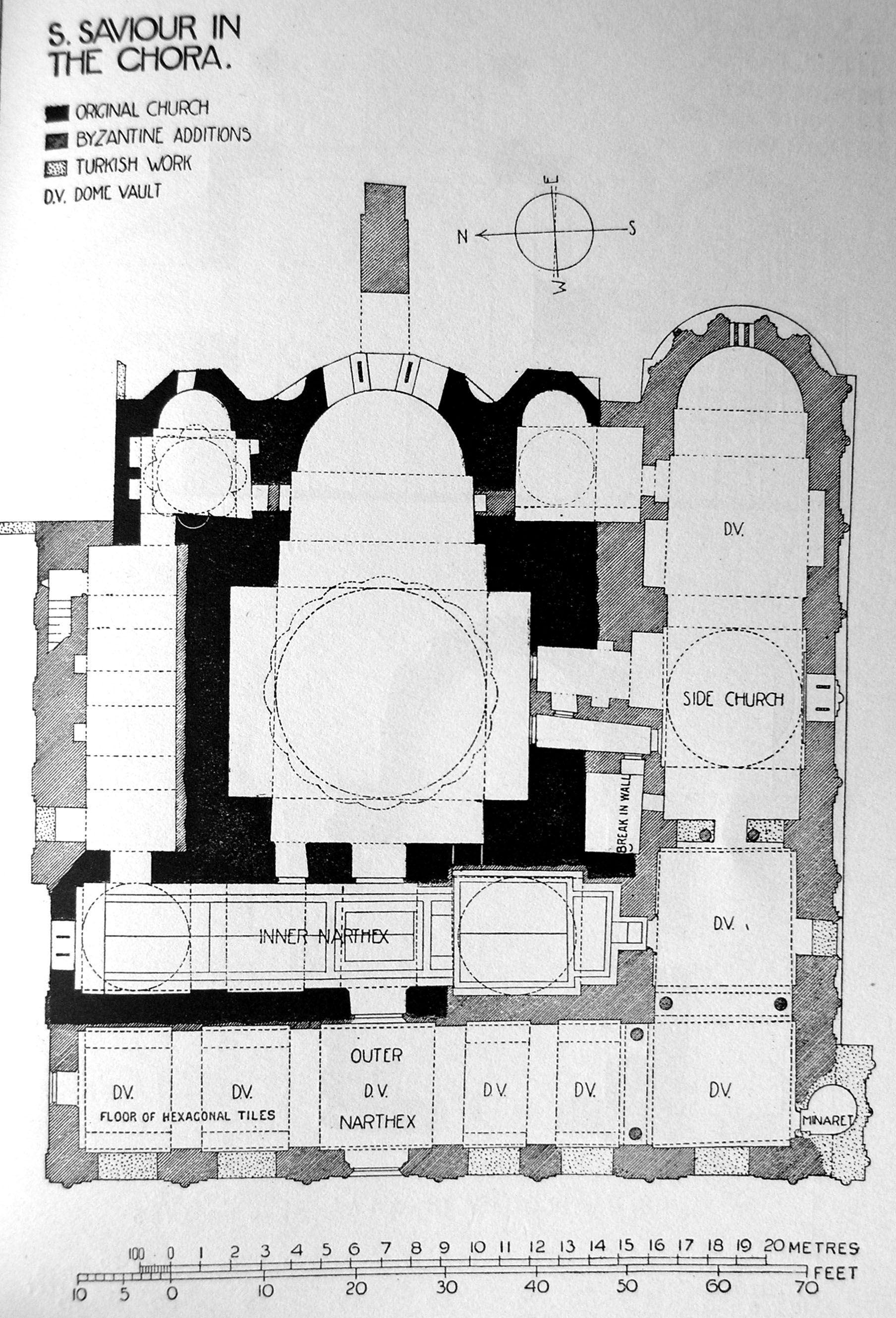
Floorplan of the Chora Church, showing both inner and outer narthex.

The original meaning of the classical Greek word narthex, νάρθηξ, was "giant fennel". Derived meanings are from the use of the fennel stalk as thyrsus, as a schoolmaster's cane, as a singlestick for military exercise, or as a splint for a broken limb. The term was also used for a case for unguents, and hence as the title of a number of medical works. Use for the architectural feature of church building is medieval Byzantine Greek, in use by the 12th century (Etymologicum Magnum). English use dates from the 1670s. It is not clear how this meaning was derived, allegedly from a resemblance of the entrance area of the church to a hollow stem.

In English the narthex now designates the porch outside the church at the liturgical west end; formerly it was a part of the church building itself, albeit not considered part of the church proper, used as the place for penitents.

== Purpose ==
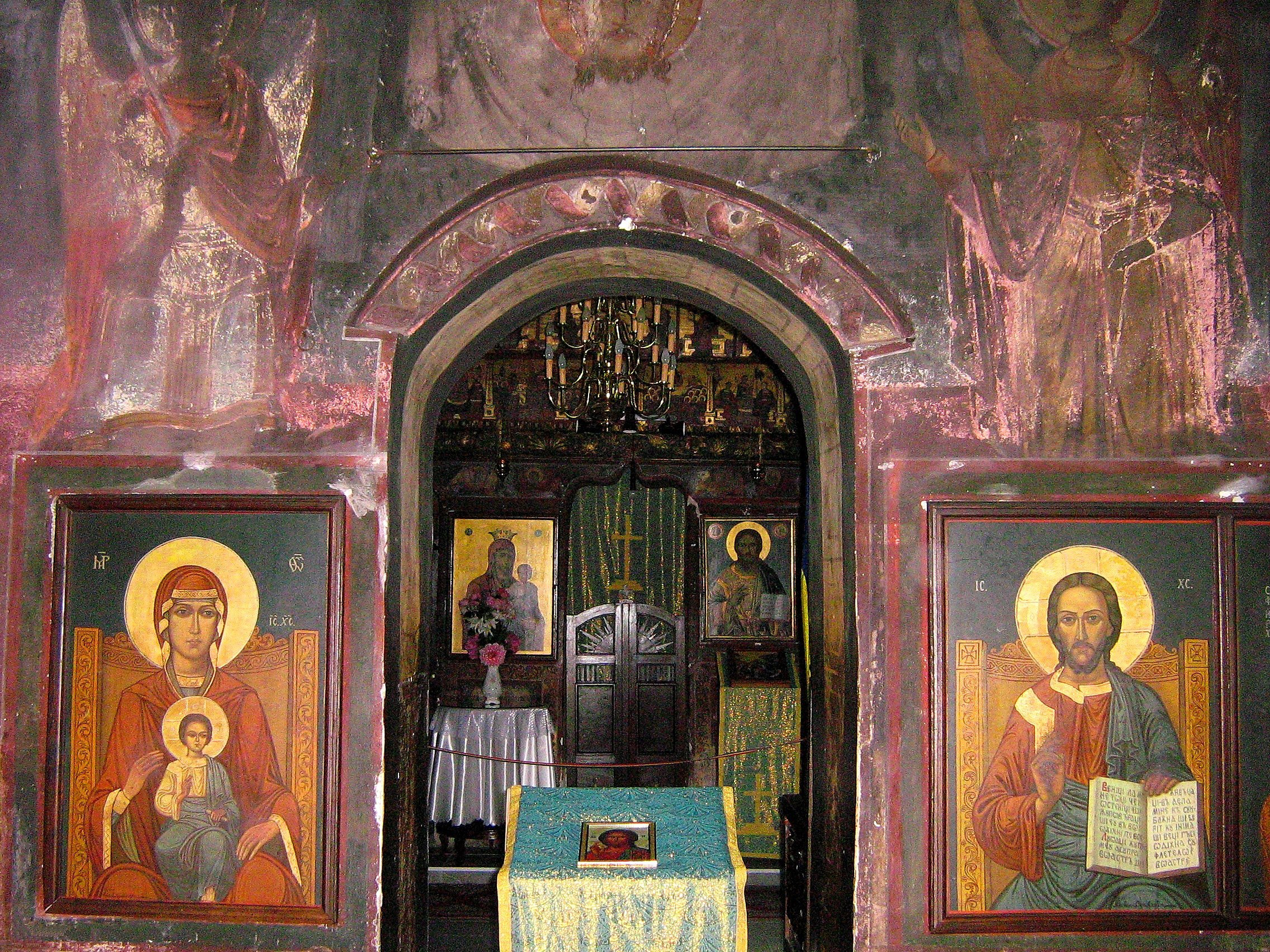
In the narthex of a small Orthodox church in Romania, looking through the doorway into the nave and Holy Doors.

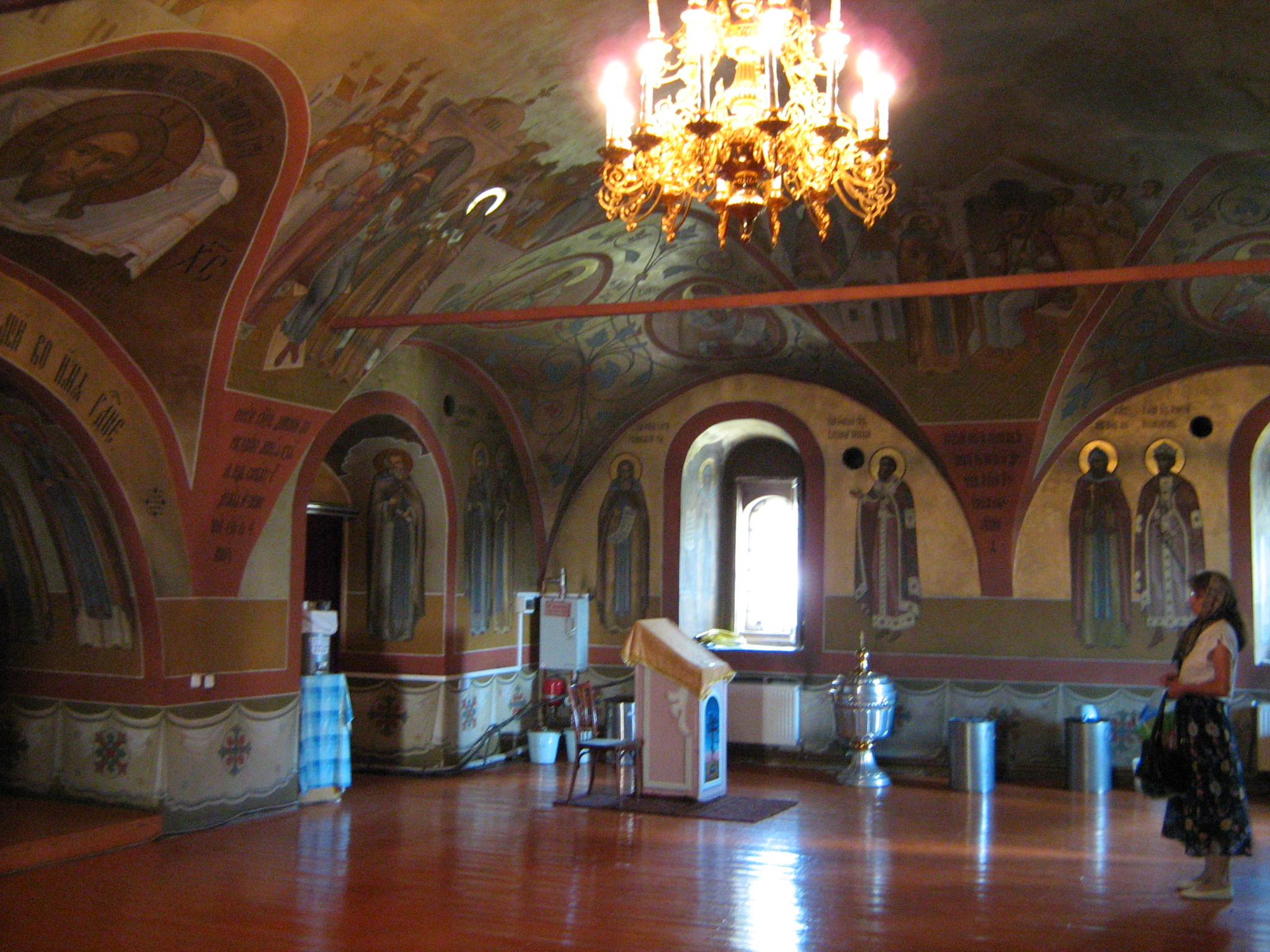
Side view of a narthex in an Eastern Orthodox temple. In the center is an analogion at which the priest hears confessions, to the right of that is a silver baptismal font and vessels for dispensing holy water. The main hall is to the left (Pechersky Ascension Monastery, Nizhny Novgorod).

The purpose of the narthex was to allow those not eligible for admittance into the general congregation (particularly catechumens and penitents) to hear and partake of the service. The narthex would often include a baptismal font so that infants or adults could be baptized there before entering the nave, and to remind other believers of their baptisms as they gathered to worship. The narthex is thus traditionally a place of penitence, and in Eastern Christianity some penitential services, such as the Little Hours during Holy Week are celebrated there, rather than in the main body of the church. In the Russian Orthodox Church funerals are traditionally held in the narthex.

Later reforms removed the requirement to exclude people from services who were not full members of the congregation, which in some traditions obviated the narthex. Church architects continued, however, to build a room before the entrance of the nave. This room could be called an inside vestibule (if it is architecturally part of the nave structure) or a porch (if it is a distinct, external structure). Some traditions still call this area the narthex as it represents the point of entry into the church, even if everyone is admitted to the nave itself.

In the Eastern Orthodox Church, the esonarthex and exonarthex had, and still have, distinct liturgical functions. For instance, the procession at the Paschal Vigil will end up at the exonarthex for the reading of the Resurrection Gospel, while certain penitential services are traditionally chanted in the esonarthex.

In some Eastern Orthodox temples, the narthex will be referred to as the refectory or trapeza, because in ancient times, tables would be set up there after the Divine Liturgy for the faithful to eat a common meal, similar to the agape feast of the early church. To this day, this is where the faithful will bring their baskets at Pascha (Easter) for the priest to bless the Paschal foods which they will then take back to their homes for the festive break-fast. Traditionally, the narthex is where candles and prosphora will be sold for offering during Divine Services.

On feast days there will be a procession to the narthex, followed by intercessory prayers, called the Litiy.

== Gallery ==
Selected pictures

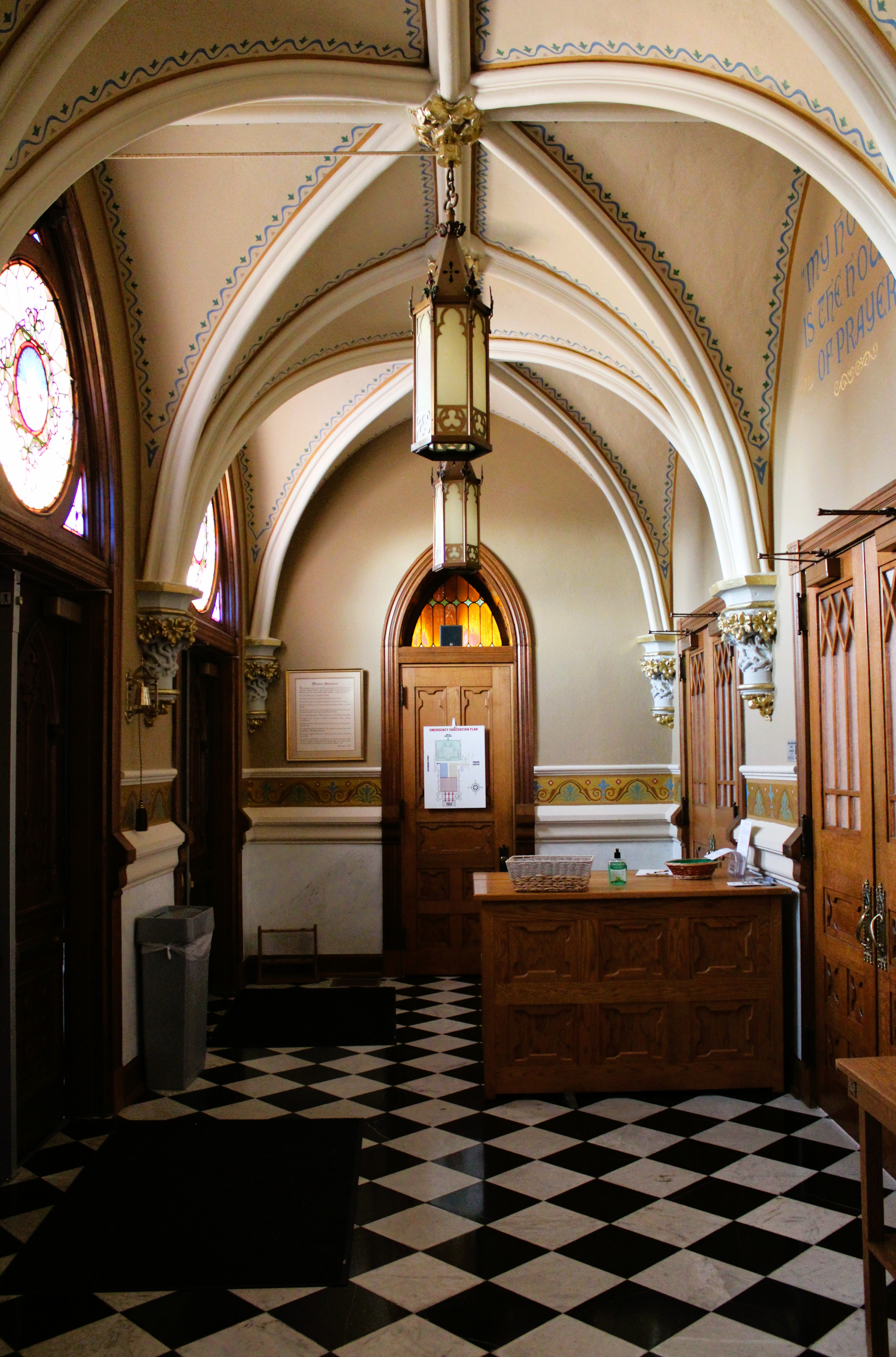
Narthex of the Basilica of St. Andrew (Roanoke, Virginia)

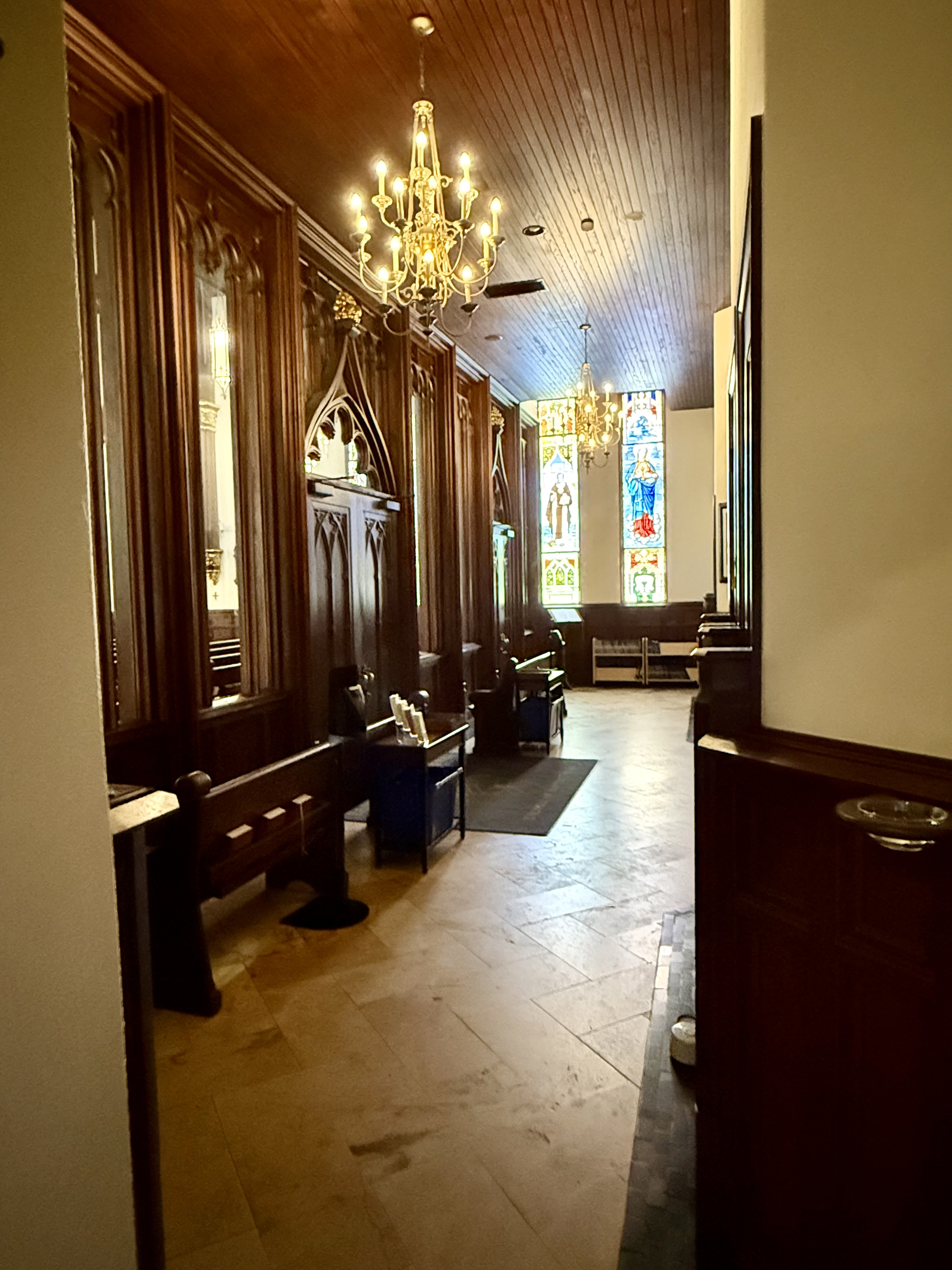
Narthex of Cathedral of Saint Mary (Austin, Texas)

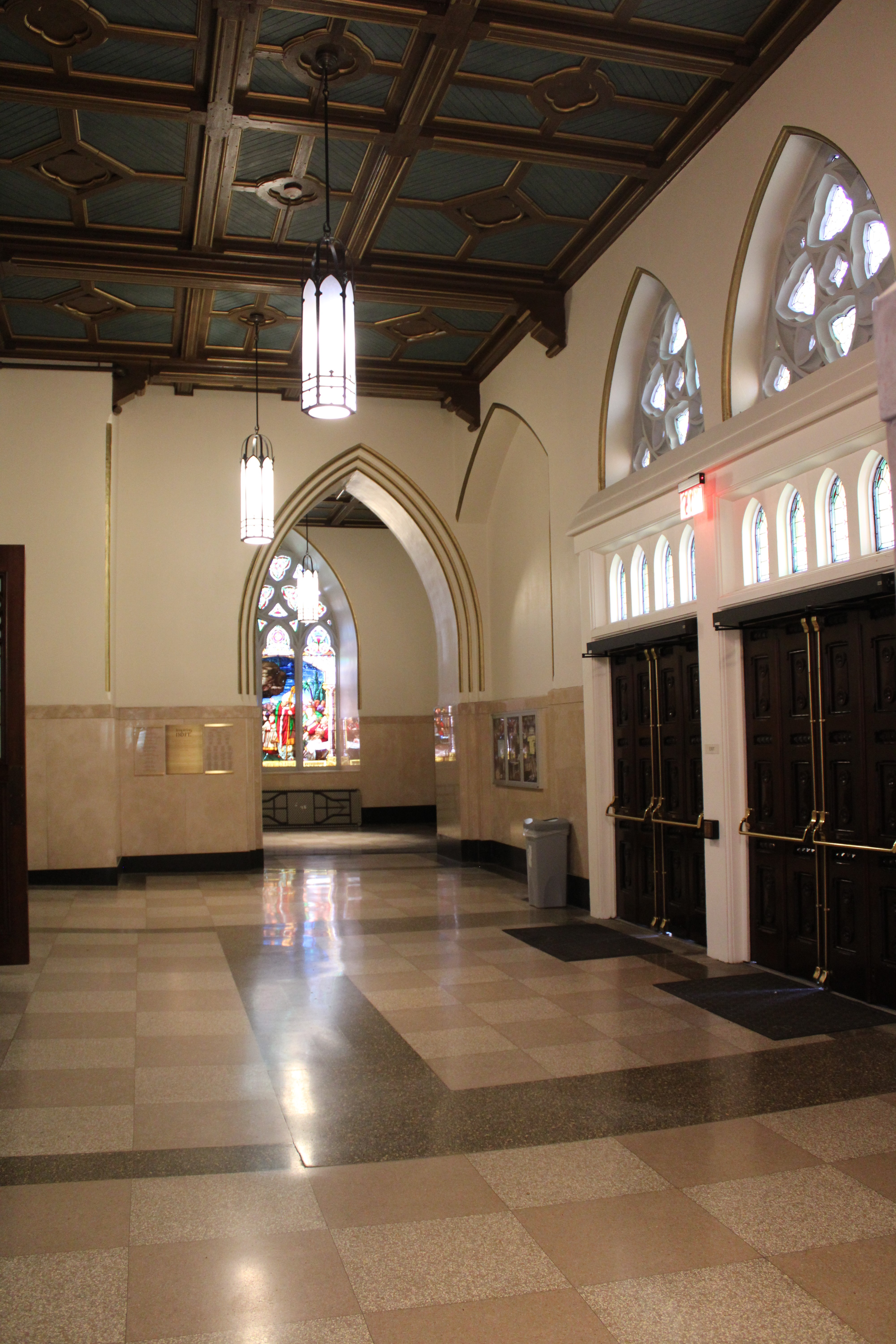
Narthex of Cathedral of the Holy Cross (Boston)

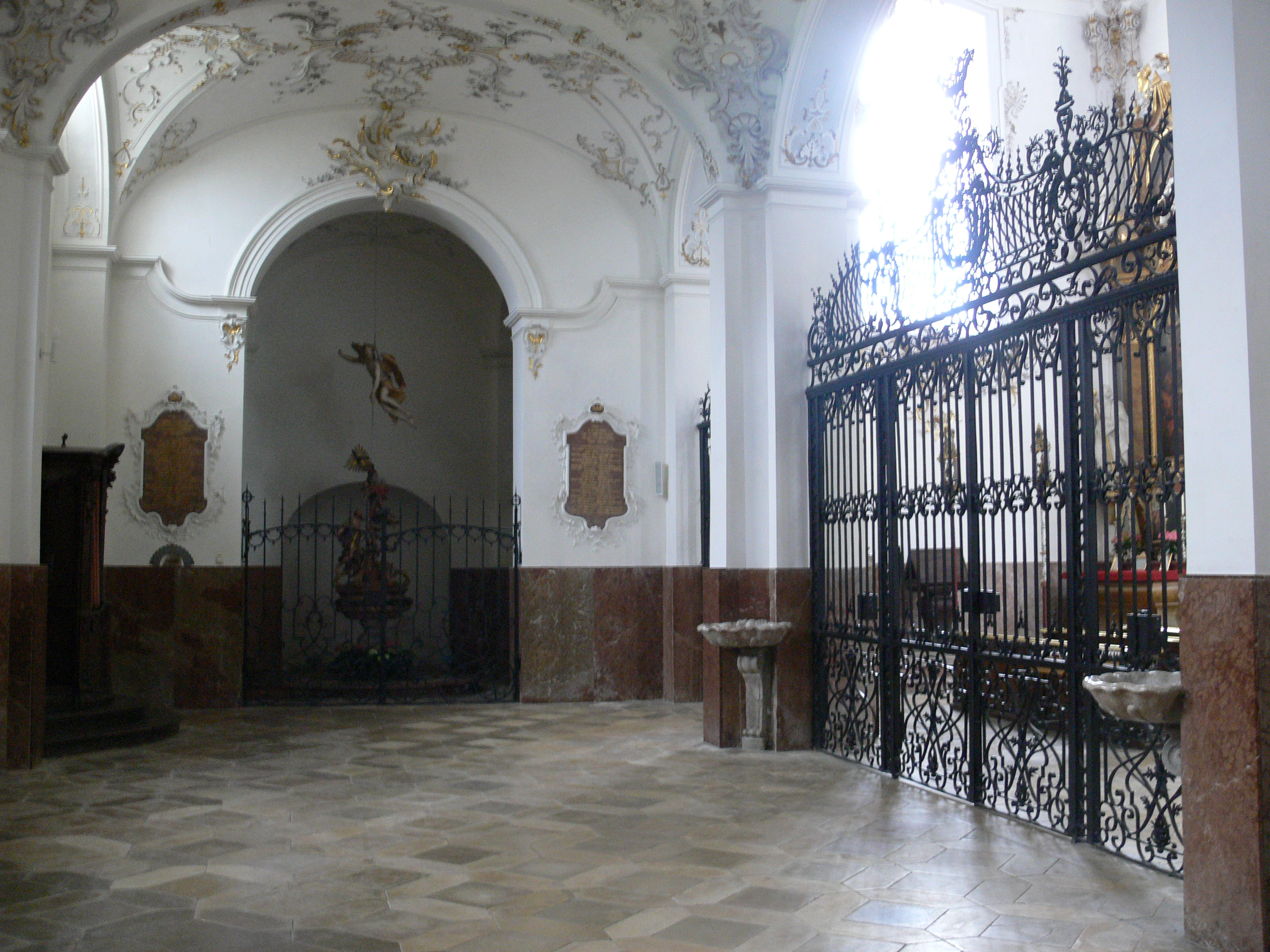
Narthex of Marienmünster Dießen in Upper Bavaria

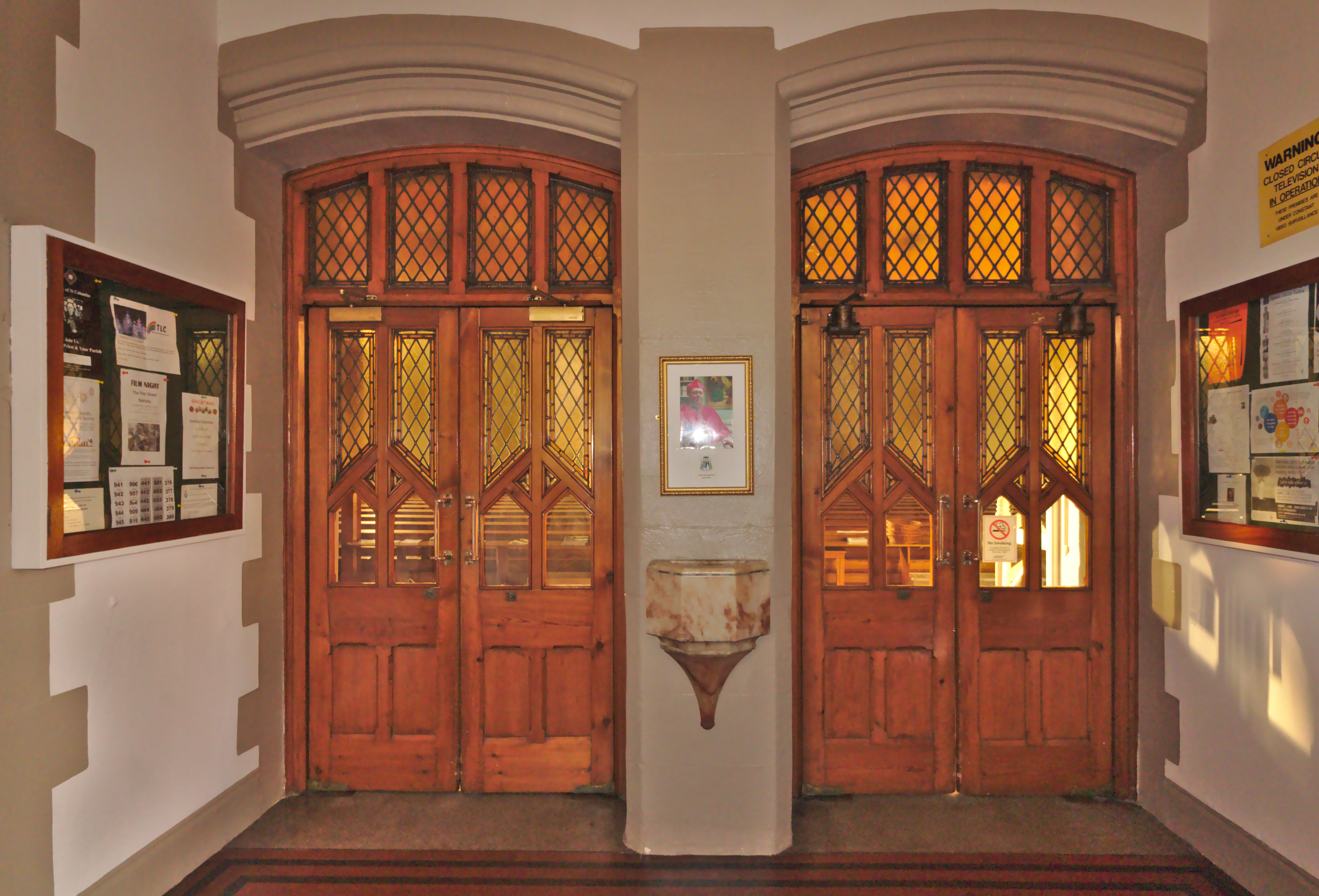
Narthex of St Charles Borromeo Church in Kingston upon Hull, England

== See also ==
- Vestibule (architecture), also known as Antechamber – Small room leading into a larger space
- Babinets (architecture) – Church architecture element
- Cathedral floorplan, also known as Cathedral diagram – Diagrammatic explanation of a church's arrangement
- Liturgical east and west – Concept in church architecture orientation
- Lobby – Building entry room
- Scarsella – Type of church apse
- Westwork – Church architectural feature
