= Basilica di Sant'Andrea (disambiguation) =

Basilica di Sant'Andrea can refer to:

- Basilica di Sant'Andrea, monastery in Vercelli, Piedmont, northern Italy
- Basilica di Sant'Andrea di Mantova, Renaissance church in Mantua, Lombardy Italy
- Sant'Andrea della Valle (Basilica di Sant'Andrea della Valle), a basilica church in Rome, Italy

== See also ==
- St. Andrew's Basilica, Arthunkal in Arthunkal
- Basilica of St. Andrew (Roanoke, Virginia)
- Basilica of St. Andrew the Apostle
- Saint Andrew of Patras, Greek Orthodox basilica
