= Mount St. Mary's Hospital =

Historic hospital in New York, United States

- U.S. National Register of Historic Places
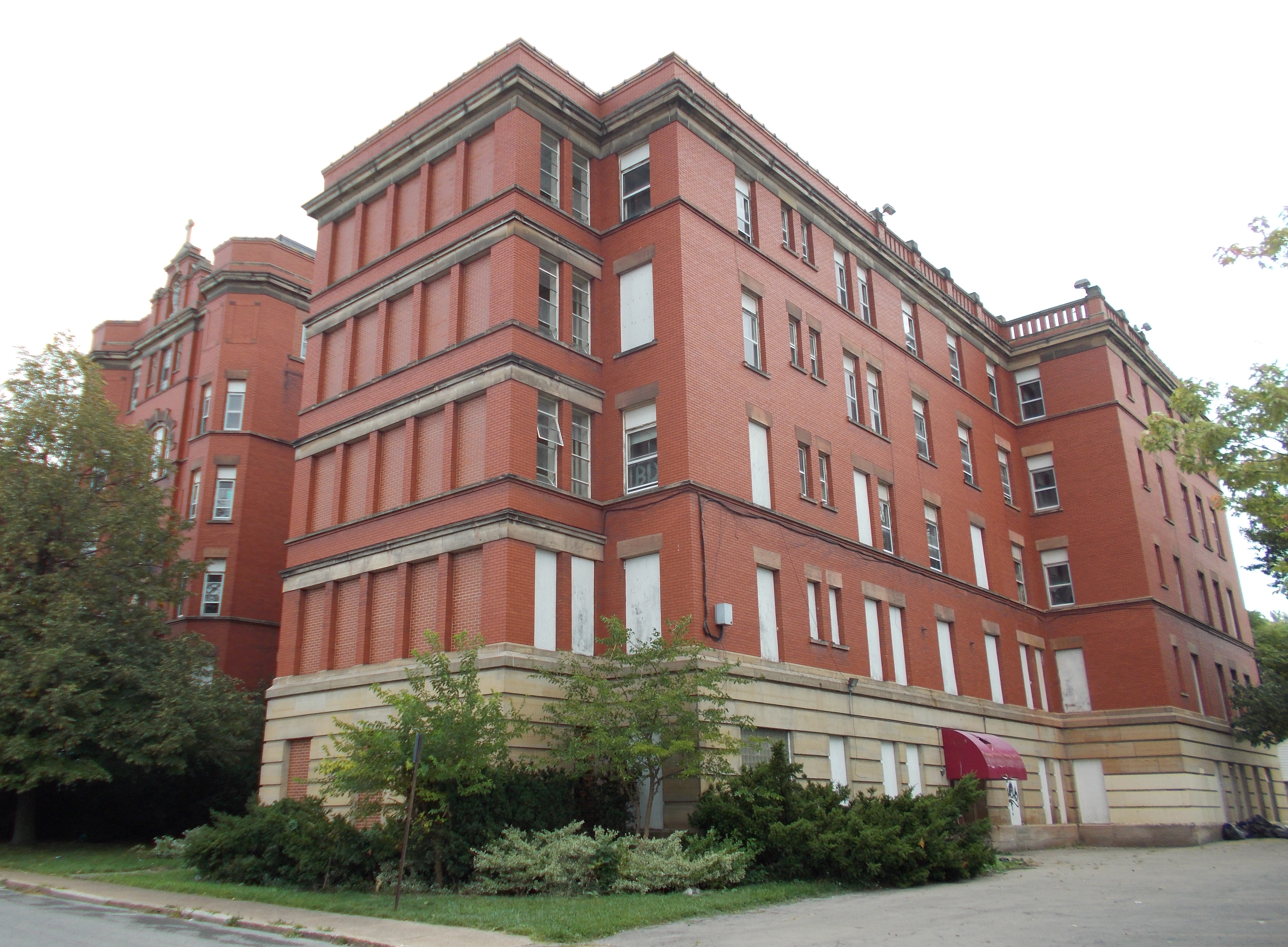
- St. Mary's in September 2016

- Location within New York Location within the United States
- Location: 515 6th St., Niagara Falls, New York
- Coordinates: 43°5′30″N 79°3′19″W
- Built: 1912-1914
- Architect: William P. Ginther
- Architectural style: Neoclassical Revival
- NRHP reference No.: 15000922
- Added to NRHP: December 22, 2015

Mount St. Mary's Hospital or St. Mary's Manor is a historic Neoclassical Revival hospital building located at Niagara Falls in Niagara County, New York. It was listed on the National Register of Historic Places in 2015.

== Design ==
The building was constructed in 1912-1914 and designed by architect William P. Ginther. The building is red brick on a raised limestone foundation. The hospital is a winged building, consisting of a 9-story, red brick center tower block flanked by matching 5-story blocks, threaded together by a central corridor expressed in two thin 7-story connectors. The main facade is oriented towards Sixth Street. A 1948 3-story addition to the north is set back, fronting the alley. Together the three blocks and their corridors form a back-to-back "E" configuration in plan and a soaring prospect in elevation.

The Neoclassical Revival styled building are an example of institutional design reflected in certain features including its "large-scale massing, rectangular multi-unit plan with connecting corridors, central pavilion featuring entry porch with Ionic columns and full entablature, limestone belt coursing and trim, repetitive fenestration, stone cornice, and flat roofs." The former hospital is built up to its east and west property lines with park-like courtyards between the projecting blocks. There is a small parking lot and fenced in park-like lawn sit adjacent to the south of the structure, where the first Mount St. Mary's Hospital, known as the "House on the Corner," once stood.

== Use ==
From 1914 until 1965, the building was a functioning hospital. Following the development of the "new" Mount Saint Mary's Hospital in Lewiston, New York in 1965, the hospital was closed and sold to Catholic Charities of the Roman Catholic Diocese of Buffalo. From 1966 until 2003, the building was known as St. Mary's Manor, and was a 104-bed nursing home. The $1,500,000 1966 renovation was designed by local architect Mortimer J. Murphy Jr. (1915-2003). Since 2003, the building has been vacant.
