= St. Peter's Church (Mansfield, Ohio) =

Historic church in Ohio, United States

- St. Peters Church
- U.S. National Register of Historic Places
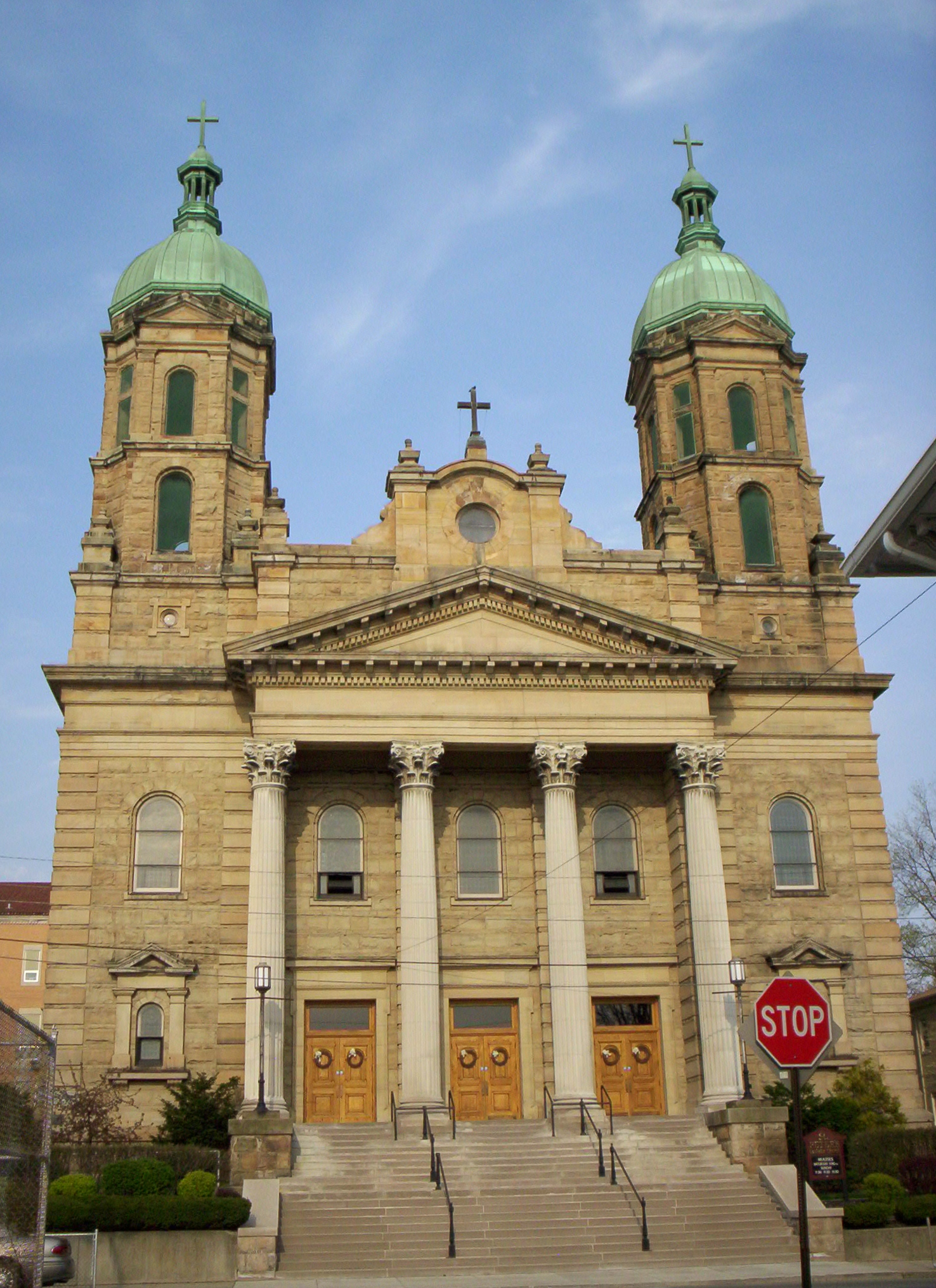

- Location within Ohio Location within the United States
- Location: 60 S. Mulberry St, Mansfield, Ohio
- Coordinates: 40°45′25″N 82°31′7″W
- Area: less than one acre
- Built: 1911
- Architect: William P. Guinther
- Architectural style: Mission/spanish Revival, Romanesque
- NRHP reference No.: 79001930
- Added to NRHP: November 29, 1979

St. Peter's Church is a historic Catholic church at 60 S. Mulberry Street in Mansfield, Ohio.

== History ==
The first Catholic mass was celebrated in Mansfield in 1850, and shortly after, Mansfield's Catholic community purchased its first building, a former Methodist church. The parish built its first church in 1870, which burned down in 1889. Shortly after the fire, an impromptu combination church-school building was built adjacent to the current building. By the early 20th century, though, the parish had outgrown its quarters, and land was acquired for a new church. Prolific church architect William P. Ginther was commissioned to design the church, and Bishop of Cleveland John Patrick Farrelly laid the cornerstone on May 14, 1911. Ginther saw the neo-baroque St. Peter's as an "architectural cousin" to his neo-romanesque St. Bernard’s Church in Akron. Due to delays caused by the First World War, the church was finally dedicated on September 16, 1917. It has an ornate, baroque interior. The church was added to the National Register of Historic Places in 1979.

The church falls under the Roman Catholic Diocese of Toledo, whose current bishop is the Most Reverend Daniel Thomas. The parish also owns St. Peter's Catholic School, a combined montessori, elementary, middle school, and high school, founded in 1958. As of 2024, the school has 228 students enrolled in K-12 classes.
