= Saint John the Evangelist Catholic Church (Logan, Ohio) =

Historic church in Ohio, United States

- Saint John the Evangelist Catholic Church Complex
- U.S. National Register of Historic Places
- U.S. Historic district
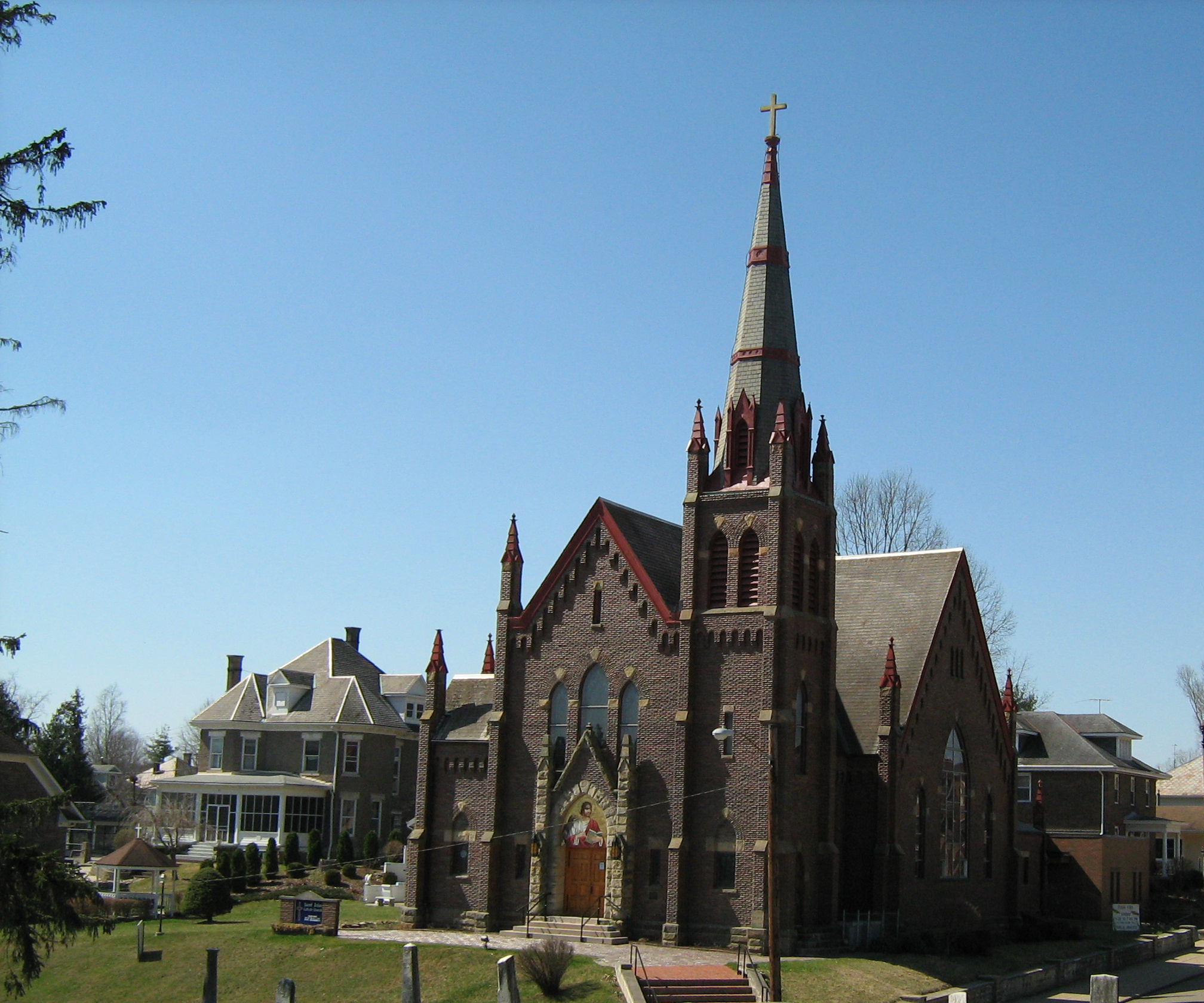

- Location within Ohio Location within the United States
- Location: 351 N. Market St., Logan, Ohio
- Coordinates: 39.54351°N 82.40886°W
- Area: 2 acres (0.81 ha)
- Built: 1897
- Architect: William P. Ginther; Kraus & Helmkamp
- Architectural style: Colonial Revival; Late Gothic Revival
- NRHP reference No.: 97000200
- Added to NRHP: March 13, 1997

Saint John the Evangelist Catholic Church Complex is a historic church of the Roman Catholic Diocese of Columbus at 351 North Market Street in Logan, Ohio. The current structure was built in 1897 in a Colonial Revival / Late Gothic Revival style. The church and surrounding complex was added to the National Register of Historic Places in 1997.

== History ==
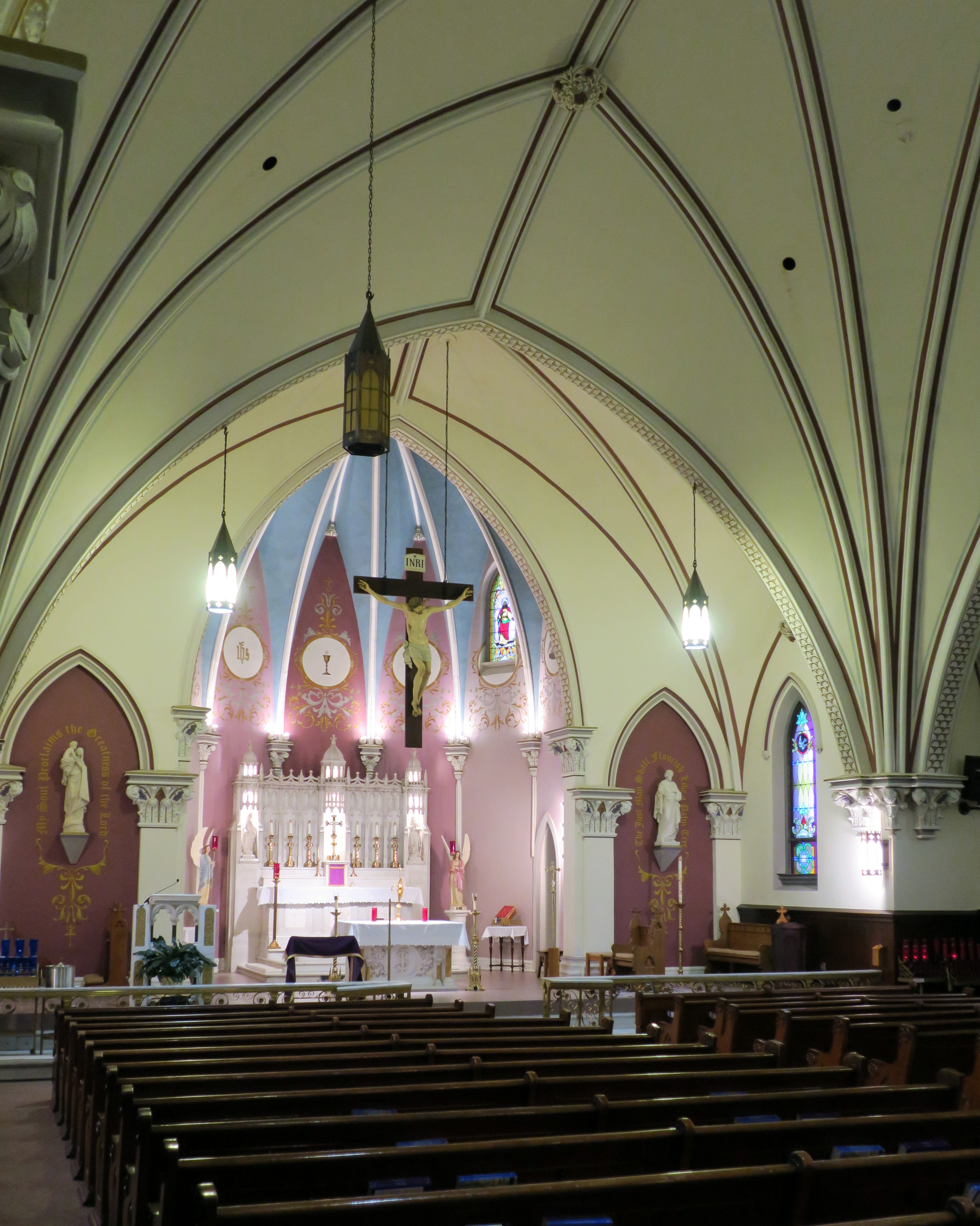
Interior of the current church, which was completed in 1898.

The first Catholics in the Hocking County area were brought by John Schorr, an immigrant from the Alsace region of France, who came to the area in 1835 looking for land suitable for a group of fellow French emigres. In 1837, 26 families from the region came to the Logan area. The first Masses said were in the homes of Catholics in the area, with future bishop of Erie Joshua Young ministering to the community. A log church was completed by 1844 and dedicated by bishop John Purcell in 1845.

Property for a dedicated building for worship was purchased in 1848, put under the patronage of St. John the Evangelist, and the church built there blessed by bishop John Baptist Purcell on September 20, 1848, confirming 43 people while he was there. In 1858, the community petitioned Archbishop John Purcell for a resident pastor, and a year later purchased the land on which the present church stands. By 1861, a wood frame church had been completed.

Work began on the present brick Gothic Revival structure in 1896, the cornerstone was laid by John Watterson on April 25, 1897, and was finished by 1898, with 3,000 people attending the dedication by Watterson on June 25. The building was designed by architect William P. Ginther. A new altar was installed in 1906 and frescoes painted in 1917.

An elementary school for the parish was built in 1924, and was originally staffed by Sisters of Notre Dame de Namur. Its first school year, in 1925, it served 140 students.

== Parish boundaries ==
The boundaries of the parish consist of those of Hocking County.
