= St. Bernard's Church (Akron, Ohio) =

Historic church in Ohio, United States

- U.S. National Register of Historic Places
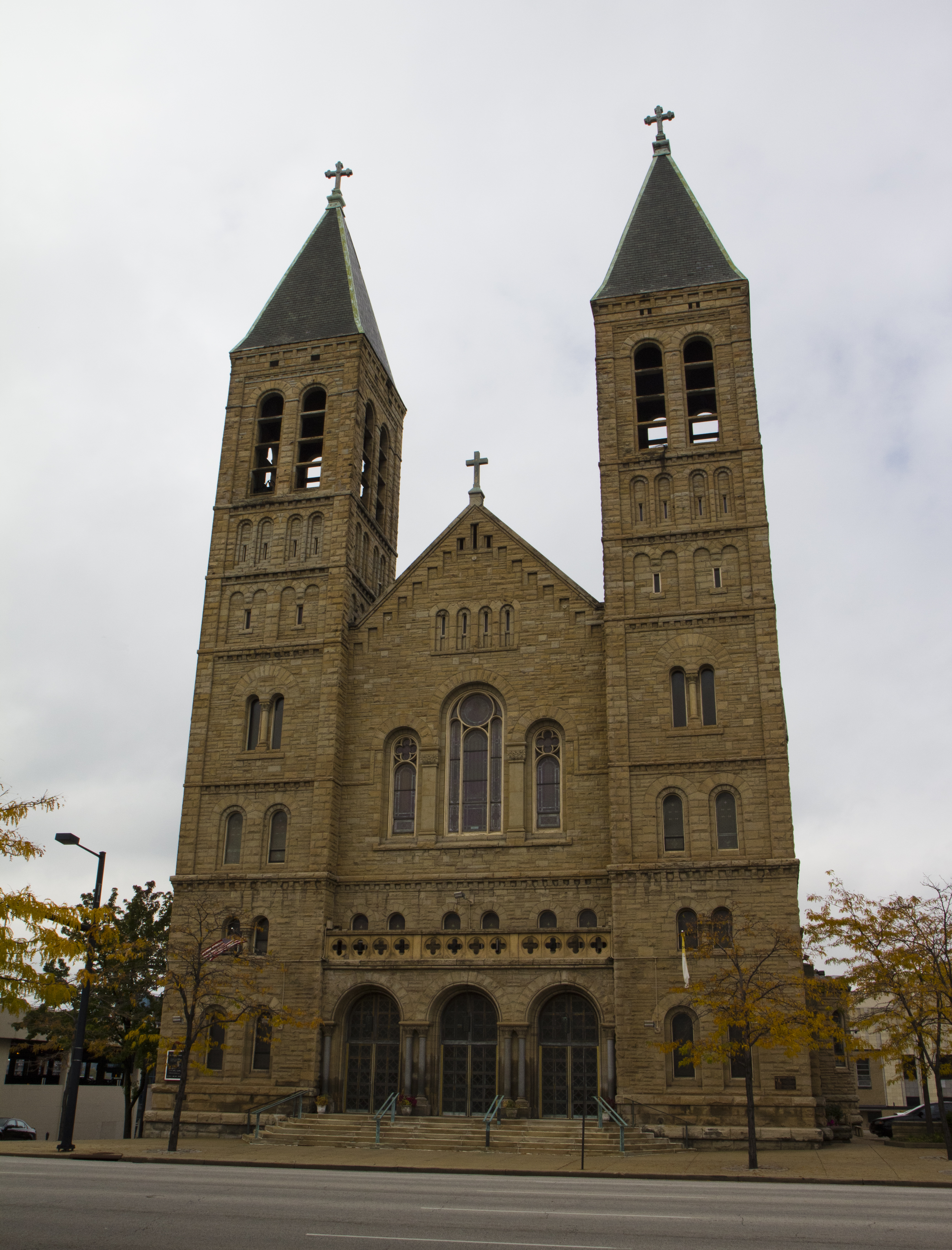
- St. Bernard's Church

- Location within Ohio Location within the United States
- Location: 44 University Avenue, Akron, Ohio
- Coordinates: 41°4′41″N 81°31′7″W
- Area: about one acre
- Built: 1905
- Architect: William P. Ginther
- Architectural style: German Romanesque
- NRHP reference No.: 89000174
- Added to NRHP: March 9, 1989

St. Bernard's Church (/ˈbɜːrnərdz/ BURN-ərdz) is a historic stone masonry church at 44 University Avenue in Akron, Ohio.

== History ==
The original church was built in 1861, on the current site of the National Inventors Hall of Fame STEM High School. The cornerstone was laid in 1901 before construction is 1902. The current church building was begun in 1902, and opened in 1905. The church's interior was decorated by Rambusch Decorating Company.

It features a German Baroque Romanesque style. St. Bernard Church was added to the National Register of Historic Places in 1989. The church was designed by noted Akron-born architect William P. Ginther, whose legacy of prominent Catholic church buildings is particularly robust in his native Ohio and neighboring states. The church features symmetrical massing, monochromatic stone, and round semi-circular arches. The building also features recessed windows and rock-faced exterior walls, which is consistent with Richardsonian Romanesque style.
