= Bethlehem, Ohio =

Unincorporated community in Ohio, U.S.

Bethlehem
- Unincorporated community
- Interactive map of Bethlehem
- Coordinates: 40°50′19″N 82°43′12″W
- Country: United States
- State: Ohio
- County: Richland
- Post office: 1887–1895
- Time zone: UTC-5 (EST)
  - Summer (DST): UTC-4 (EDT)

Bethlehem is an unincorporated community in Richland County, in the U.S. state of Ohio.

== History ==
Bethlehem had its start in the 1830s as a small colony centered around a Catholic church. A post office called Bethlehem was established in 1887, and remained in operation until 1895.
