= Liturgical east and west =

Concept in church architecture orientation

A schematic plan showing the elements and orientation that are common to many churches

Liturgical east and west is a concept in the orientation of Christian churches. For symbolic religious reasons, the altar is traditionally at the east end of the church (to the right in the diagram).

Traditionally, Christian churches (especially those of the Orthodox, Catholic, and Lutheran traditions) are constructed so that during the celebration of the morning liturgy the priest and congregation face towards the rising sun, a symbol of Christ and the Second Coming. However, frequently the building cannot be built to match liturgical direction. In parish churches, liturgical directions often do not coincide with geography; even in cathedrals, liturgical and geographic directions can be in opposition (for example, at St. Mark's Episcopal Cathedral, Seattle, liturgical east is nearly due west).

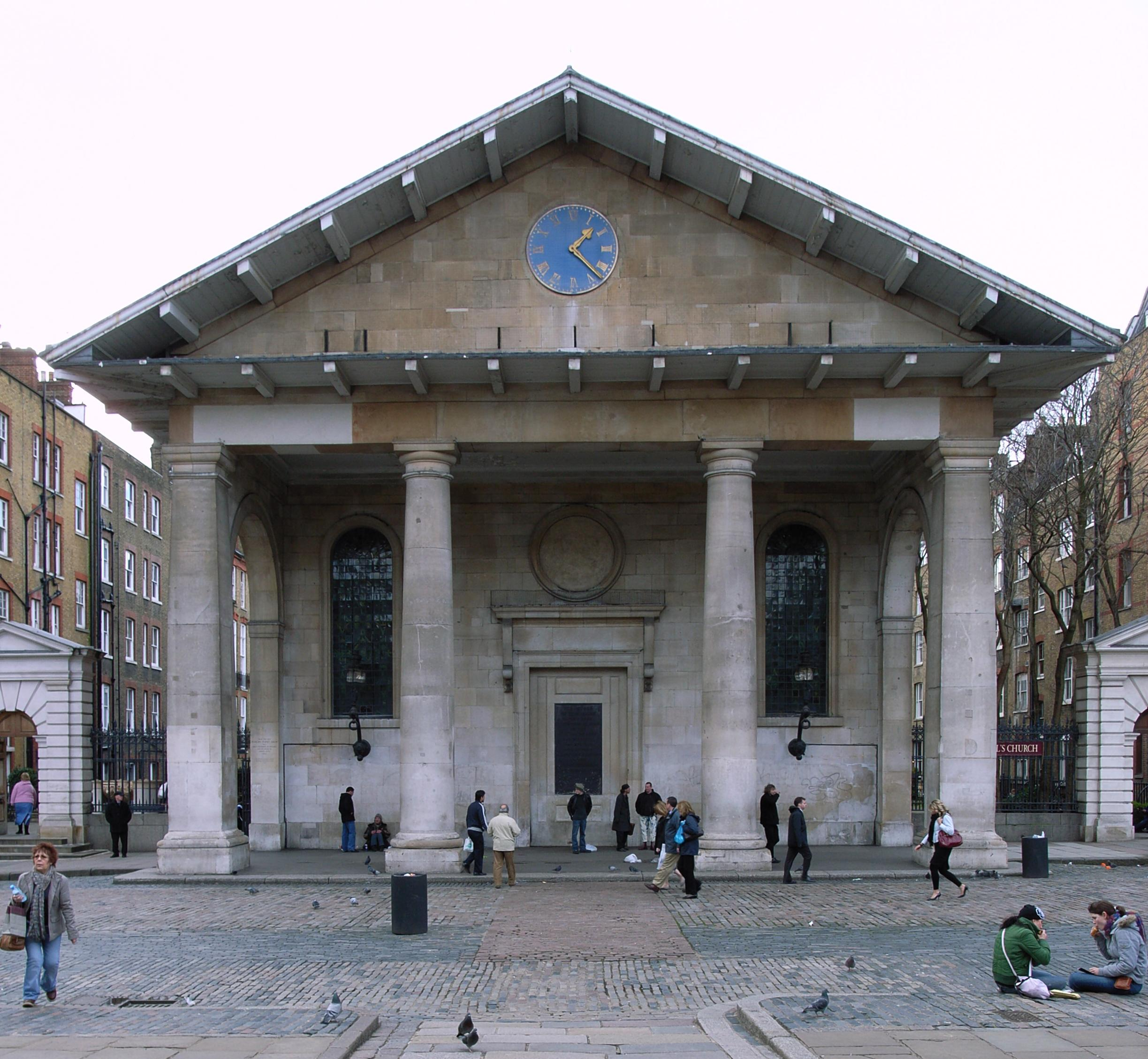
St Paul's, Covent Garden, London, 1631, by Inigo Jones. This is the east facade of the church, and the doorway is blocked; the altar is behind the wall

For convenience, churches are always described as though the end with the main altar is at the east, whatever the reality, with the other ends and sides described accordingly. Therefore common terms such as "east end", "west door", "north aisle", etc., are immediately comprehensible. These orientations may be preceded by "liturgical", or not. In a typical Western church, such as the one illustrated, the "back" of the church (behind the congregation) is therefore the west end; as one moves up the aisle towards the main altar the north side is to the left, and the south to the right.

A relatively unusual example of a church where literal adherence to liturgical orientation overrode architectural considerations is St Paul's, Covent Garden in London, of 1631, by Inigo Jones. This was the first completely new English church since the English Reformation, and was given a site on the west side of the new Covent Garden development. Jones seems to have designed the church with three main entrance doors at the (literal) east end, under a grand classical temple portico with steps leading down to the square; inside, the sanctuary and altar were at the opposite west end. It appears there were objections to his arrangement; when the church opened, the three doors onto the square were blocked off, entrance to the church was through the west end, and the sanctuary and altar were placed at the "correct" east end.
