= Sacred Heart of Jesus Church (Bethlehem, Ohio) =

Historic church in Ohio, United States

- Sacred Heart of Jesus Churches
- U.S. National Register of Historic Places
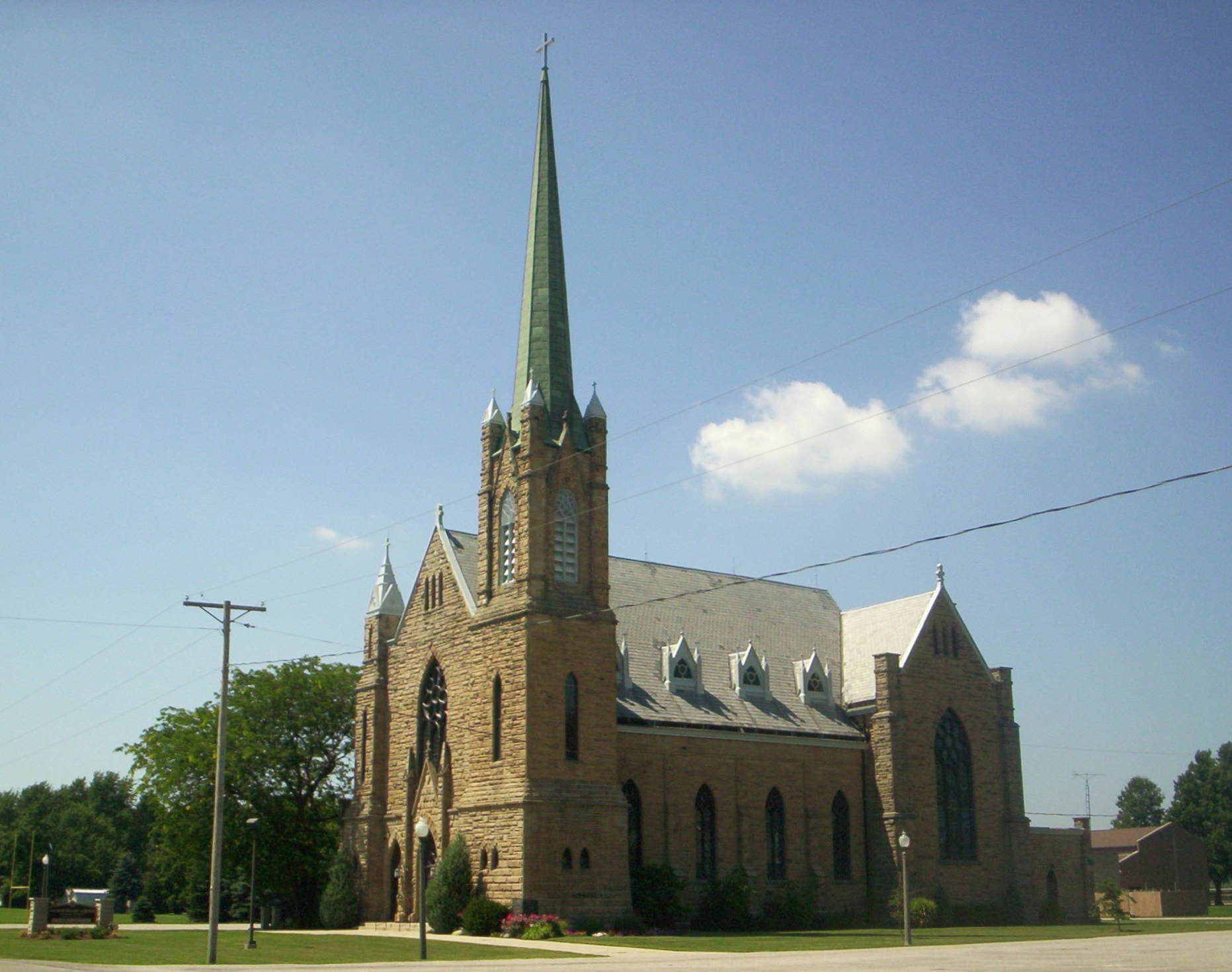

- Location within Ohio Location within the United States
- Location: OH 61, Bethlehem, Ohio
- Coordinates: 40°50′16″N 82°43′21″W
- Area: less than one acre
- Built: 1892-1895
- Architect: William P. Ginther
- Architectural style: Gothic, Gothic Revival
- NRHP reference No.: 86000035
- Added to NRHP: January 6, 1986

Sacred Heart of Jesus Churches (Bethlehem Church) is a historic church located on OH-61 in Bethlehem, Sharon Township, Richland County, Ohio.

The cornerstone was laid in 1892 and the church was dedicated in 1895. It was added to the National Register in 1986.

In 1967, the church was adopted into the mission of the parish of Shelby, OH; however, the following year the parish center was relocated to Bethlehem as its center of operations, where it remains today.
