= Most Pure Heart Of Mary Church =

Historic church in Ohio, United States

- U.S. National Register of Historic Places
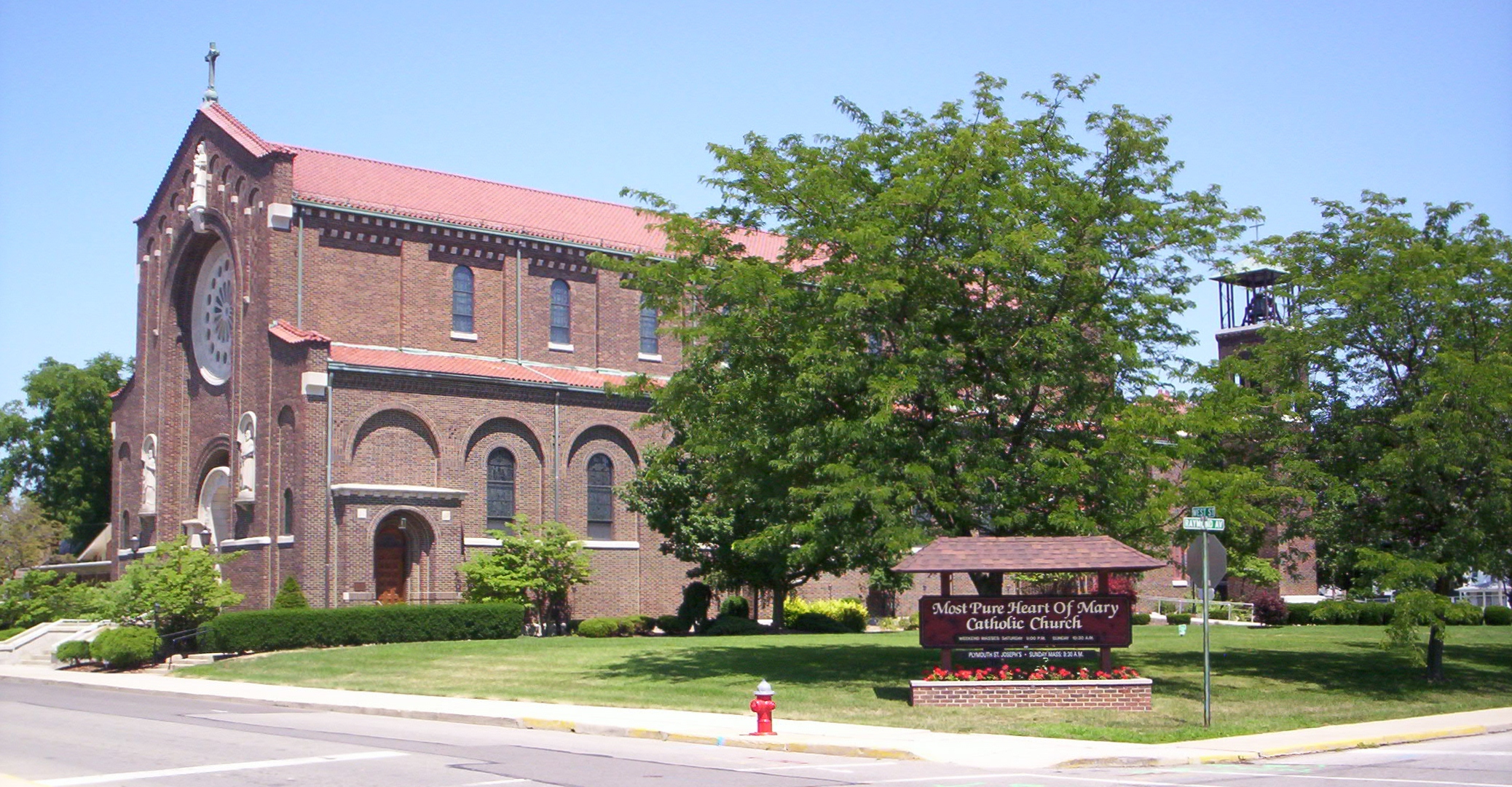

- Location within Ohio Location within the United States
- Location: West St. and Raymond Ave., Shelby, Ohio
- Coordinates: 40°52′58″N 82°40′2″W
- Area: less than one acre
- Built: 1924
- Architect: W.R. Dowling, et al.
- Architectural style: Romanesque
- NRHP reference No.: 78002179
- Added to NRHP: November 30, 1978

Most Pure Heart Of Mary Church is a historic church at West Street and Raymond Avenue in Shelby, Ohio.

It was built in 1924 and added to the National Register of Historic Places in 1978.
