= William P. Ginther =

American architect

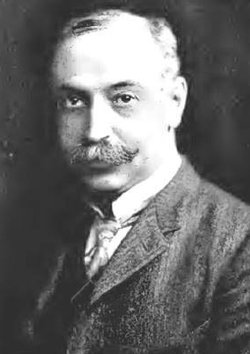
- Born: William Peter Ginter; March 21, 1858; Akron, Ohio, US
- Died: January 15, 1933 (aged 74); Cuyahoga Falls, Ohio, US
- Known for: Architect
- Spouse: Emma Wohlwend

William Peter Ginther (FAIA) (March 21, 1858 – January 15, 1933) was an American architect based in Akron, Ohio. He was a prolific designer of Roman Catholic churches, schools and rectories throughout Ohio, Pennsylvania, Indiana, California, Virginia and New York.

== Early life and education ==
Ginther was born in Akron, Ohio, on March 21, 1858. His parents were Stephen and Anna M. (née Horning) Ginther. His father was a merchant tailor to the elite of the city. William attended Akron public schools (including the Jennings School) and was enrolled at Buchtel College for a short time.

Ginther died at his home, 837 Chestnut Boulevard in Cuyahoga Falls, Ohio, on January 15, 1933.

== Architectural career ==
Reportedly, he drew a comic valentine for a girl, which was seen by Frank Weary, then Akron's leading architect, who then hired Ginther into his office. Ginther worked at his first architectural position in Weary's office from 1879 through 1886. He made a tour of Europe in 1889, including the cities of Rome, Milan, Paris, Venice, Florence, London, Berlin, Vienna and many other noted centers of art. Upon his return to Akron he established his own company and, in a period extending over 40 years, he served the needs of many Roman Catholic clients throughout the Midwest.

=== Legacy ===
Ginther was named a Fellow of the American Institute of Architects. Many of his buildings are listed in the National Register of Historic Places. One of his churches, Holy Family in Tulsa, Oklahoma, has been raised to the status of a cathedral.

== Works ==
=== Churches in Ohio ===
- Annunciation Church, Akron, Ohio
- St. Bernard Church and Rectory, Akron, Ohio
- St. Mary Church (original wooden church) and Rectory, Akron, Ohio
- St. Columbia Church (destroyed by fire in 1954), Youngstown, Ohio
- St. John the Evangelist Church (Columbus, Ohio)
- St. Thomas the Apostle Church, Columbus, Ohio
- St. Leo Church (Columbus, Ohio)
- St. Martin Church (demolished), Cleveland, Ohio
- Holy Trinity Church (closed), Cleveland, Ohio
- Holy Rosary Church, Cleveland, Ohio
- Sacred Heart of Jesus Church, Cleveland, Ohio
- Annunciation Church, (demolished) Cleveland, Ohio
- St. Anthony Church (not St. Maron Church), Cleveland, Ohio
- St. Adelbert's church and rectory, Cleveland, Ohio
- Mother of Sorrows Church and Rectory, Ashtabula, Ohio
- St. Joseph's Church, Ashtabula, Ohio
- Our Lady of Mt. Carmel (demolished), Ashtabula, Ohio
- St. Luke's Church, Danville, Ohio
- Sacred Heart of Jesus Church, Shelby Settlement, Ohio
- Good Shepherd Church, (closed) Toledo, Ohio;
- Immaculate Conception Church, (not sure if this is still around), Ozark, Ohio
- St. Louis Church, Gallipolis, Ohio
- SS. Cyril & Methodius Church, (demolished) Barberton, Ohio
- St. Patrick Church and Rectory, Bellefontaine, Ohio
- St. Francis Church, Carthagena, Ohio
- Holy Cross Church (demolished), Glouster, Ohio
- St. Michael Church, Gibsonburgh, Ohio
- St. Mary's Church, Antwerp, Ohio
- St. Mary Church, Payne, Ohio
- St. Nicholas Church, Miller City, Ohio
- St. Michael's Church, North Ridge, Ohio
- St. John's Church, Defiance, Ohio
- St. Mary's Church, Junction, Ohio
- Holy Name Church and Rectory, (church demolished), Steubenville, Ohio
- Nativity of the Blessed Virgin Mary, Lorain, Ohio
- Our Lady of Mt. Carmel Church and Rectory, Warren, Ohio
- Sacred Heart Church, Coshocton, Ohio
- St. John the Evangelist Church, Logan, Ohio
- St. Joseph Church, Randolph, Ohio
- St. Mary Church, Norwalk, Ohio
- Holy Rosary Church, Lowellville, Ohio
- St. Philip Neri Church and Rectory, (closed), Murray City, Ohio
- St. Peter Church, Mansfield, Ohio
- St. Paul Church, North Canton, Ohio / New Berlin, Ohio
- St Joseph Church, Circleville, Ohio
- St. Mary's, (remodeled), Massillon, Ohio
- St. Mary's Church, Van Wert, Ohio (1915)

=== Churches in Other States ===
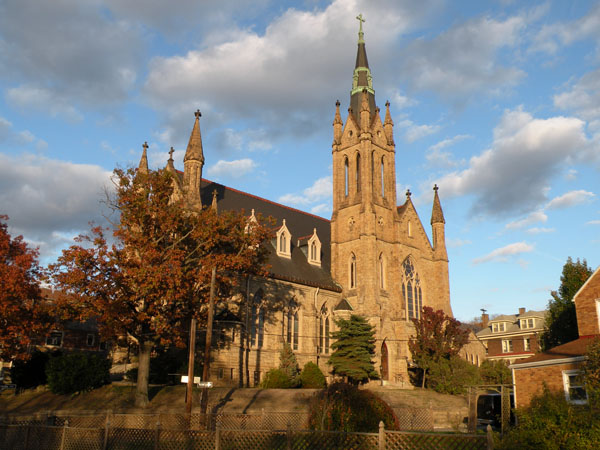
St. Philip's Church, Crafton, Pennsylvania located at 50 West Crafton Avenue, built in 1906

- Cathedral of the Holy Family, (plan only, his design was not built), Tulsa, Oklahoma
- St. Mary Church and Rectory. McKees Rocks, Pennsylvania
- St. Philip's Church, Crafton, Pennsylvania
- Immaculate Conception Church and Rectory (closed), Johnstown, Pennsylvania
- Immaculate Heart of Mary Church, Pittsburgh, Pennsylvania
- St. Anne Church Erie, Pennsylvania
- St. Andrew Church Erie, Pennsylvania
- St. Patrick Church Erie, Pennsylvania
- Sacred Heart Church, St. Mary's, Pennsylvania
- Most Holy Rosary Church, Johnsonburg, Pennsylvania
- St. Stephen's Church, South Oil City, Pennsylvania
- St. Anthony's Church, Cambridge Springs, Pennsylvania
- Basilica of St. Andrew, Roanoke, Virginia
- Santa Clara Church (the only Ginther-designed church built West of the Mississippi), Oxnard, California
- St. Joseph's Church, Perry, New York
- St. Mary Church, Cortland, New York
- St. Mary's Church, Clinton, New York
- Holy Family Church, Gas City, Indiana

=== Parochial residences ===
- St. John's Rectory, Canton, Ohio
- St. Procop Rectory, Cleveland, Ohio
- St. Augustine Rectory, Lakewood, Ohio
- Immaculate Conception Rectory, Wellsville, Ohio
- St. Pius Rectory, Mexahala, Ohio
- St. Mary Rectory, Shawnee, Ohio
- St. Mary's of the Springs Rectory, Shepherd, Ohio
- St. Joseph's Rectory, Randolph, Ohio
- St. John the Baptist Rectory, Columbus, Ohio
- St. Patrick Rectory Buchtel, Ohio

=== Parochial schools ===
- St. Bernard's School, Akron, Ohio
- St. Vincent de Paul's School, Akron, Ohio
- St. Mary School, Akron, Ohio
- St. Rose School, Lima, Ohio
- St. Joseph School, at Tiffin, Ohio
- Immaculate Conception School, Youngstown, Ohio
- St. Procop School, Cleveland, Ohio
- St. Colman School, Cleveland, Ohio
- St. Aloysius School, Cleveland, Ohio
- St. Vincent School, Cleveland, Ohio
- St. Mary School, Conneaut, Ohio
- St. Bernard School, New Washington, Ohio
- St. Joseph School Canton, Ohio
- St. Peter School, Canton, Ohio
- Immaculate Conception School, Canton, Ohio
- St. John's School Canton, Ohio
- St. Mary School, Elyria, Ohio
- St. Stephens School, Niles, Ohio
- St. Aloysius School, East Liverpool, Ohio
- St. Paul School, Salem, Ohio
- Immaculate Conception School, Wellsville, Ohio
- Holy Name School, Steubenville, Ohio
- St. Wenbelin's School, Fostoria, Ohio
- St. Augustine's School, Barberton, Ohio
- St. Michael's School, Bellaire, Ohio
- St. Mary's School, Piqua, Ohio
- Sacred Heart School, New Philadelphia, Ohio
- St. Rosa School, New Lexington, Ohio

=== Academies ===
- St. Mary's of the Springs Academy, Shepherd, Ohio
- St. Aloysius Academy, New Lexington, Ohio
- Ursuline convents Youngstown, Ohio
- Ursuline convents Tiffin, Ohio
- Villa Angela, an Ursuline academy (remodeled) Nottingham, Ohio
- Humility of Mary Academy, Mt. Marie, Ohio
- St. Joseph Academy, St. Mary's, Pennsylvania
- St. Anne, Cleveland, Ohio

=== Hospitals ===
- Mercy Hospital, Canton, Ohio
- Mount St. Mary's Hospital, Niagara Falls, New York
- St. Francis Hospital, Charleston, West Virginia
