= St. Mary's Catholic Church (Sandusky, Ohio) =

Historic church in Ohio, United States

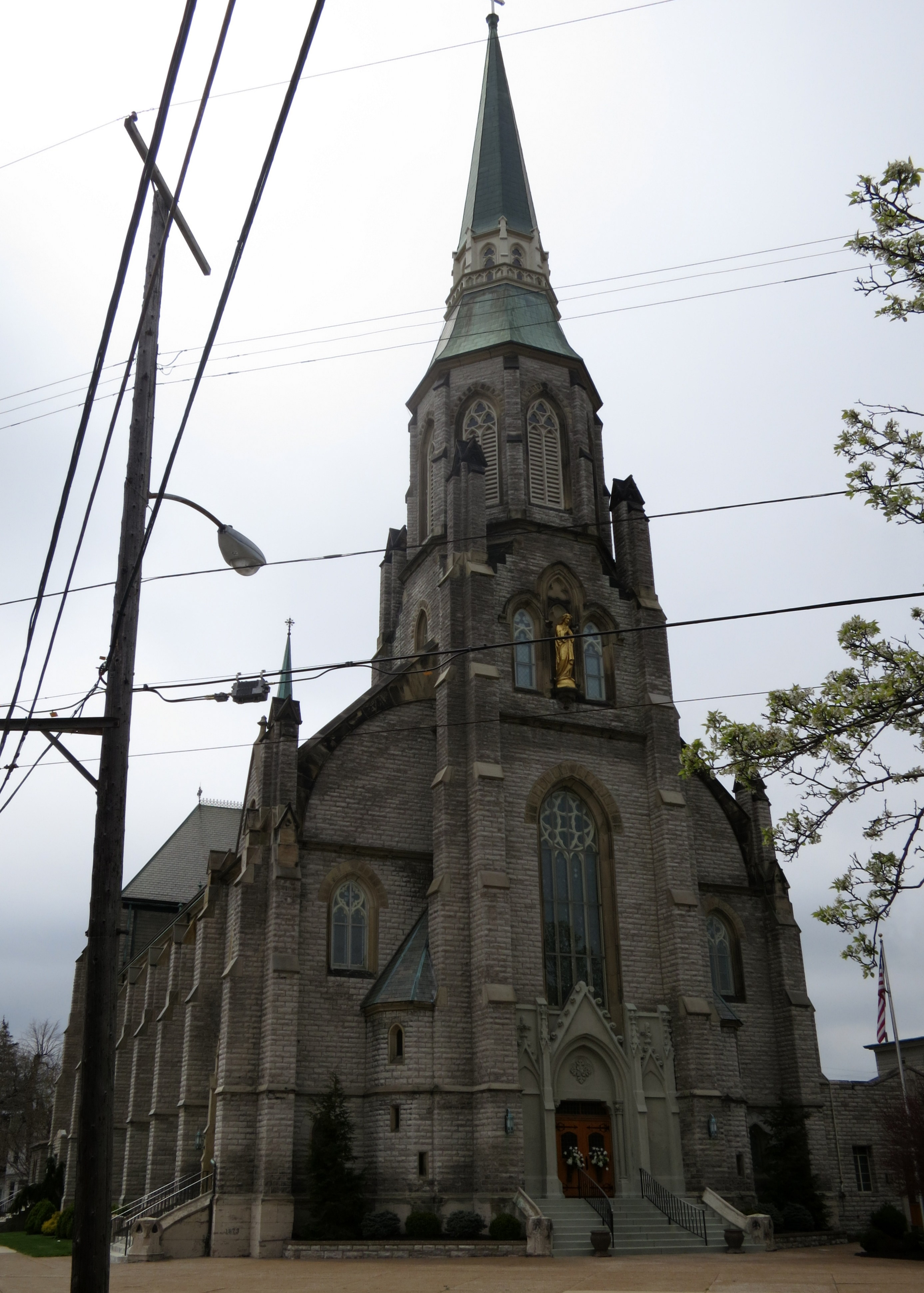
- The church exterior
- St. Mary's Catholic Church (Sandusky, Ohio)
- Location: 429 Central Avenue, Sandusky, Ohio
- Country: United States
- Denomination: Roman Catholic
- Website: www.sanduskycatholic.org

Architecture
- Heritage designation: U.S. National Register of Historic Places
- Designated: October 10, 1975
- Architect: Francis G. Himpler
- Style: Gothic
- Groundbreaking: September 28, 1873
- Completed: 1880

Specifications
- Length: 184 feet (56 m)
- Width: 76 feet (23 m)

Administration
- Diocese: Roman Catholic Diocese of Toledo
- St. Mary's Catholic Church
- U.S. National Register of Historic Places
- Location within Ohio Location within the United States
- Location: 429 Central Ave., Sandusky, Ohio
- Coordinates: 41°27′5″N 82°42′50″W
- Area: 1 acre (0.40 ha)
- Built: 1873
- Architectural style: Gothic
- NRHP reference No.: 75001391
- Added to NRHP: October 10, 1975

St. Mary's Catholic Church is a historic church at 429 Central Avenue in Sandusky, Ohio.

It was built in 1873 and added to the National Register in 1975.
