= Saint Michael's of the Ridge Roman Catholic Church =

Church building in Ohio, United States

Coordinates: 41°21′47″N 84°18′18″W

Saint Michael's of the Ridge Roman Catholic Church is a church within the Toledo Diocese of the Roman Catholic Church. The church is located on Moser Road about six miles northeast of Defiance, Ohio.

== See also ==
- Saint Michael: Roman Catholic traditions and views
