= Basilica of St. Andrew (Roanoke, Virginia) =

Historic church in Virginia, US

- St. Andrew's Roman Catholic Church
- U.S. National Register of Historic Places
- Virginia Landmarks Register
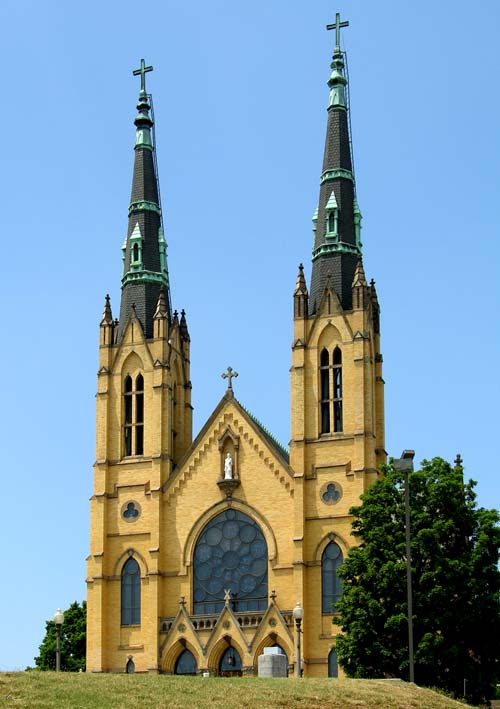
- Basilica of St. Andrew, June 2010

- Location within Virginia Location within the United States
- Location: 631 N. Jefferson St. Roanoke, Virginia
- Coordinates: 37°16′41″N 79°56′29″W
- Area: 1 acre (0.40 ha)
- Built: 1883, 1887, 1900-1902
- Architect: William Ginther
- Architectural style: Gothic Revival
- NRHP reference No.: 73002225
- VLR No.: 128-0030

Significant dates
- Added to NRHP: May 7, 1973
- Designated VLR: October 17, 1972

The Basilica of St. Andrew, also known as St. Andrew's Catholic Church, is a historic Catholic church and rectory in Roanoke, Virginia, United States. It was built in 1900-1902, and is a buff brick church on a stone foundation in the High Victorian Gothic style. It has a cruciform plan and features two tall Gothic towers which flank the main entrance and are square in plan. On each tower are two small lancet windows, two large pointed-arch stained-glass tracery windows, and sets of double pointed-arch openings at the belfry. Also on the property is a rectory built in 1887. The church replaced an earlier small brick church built in 1883.

The building cost $60,000 to construct, with another $40,000 budgeted for interior appointments and trim. "The buff brick edifice with stone trimming, designed by William P. Ginther of Akron, Ohio, would become a Roanoke landmark."

It was listed on the National Register of Historic Places in 1973.

The church has had two major renovations since its completion. The first renovations took place after the Second Vatican Council authorized certain liturgical alterations. A freestanding altar was installed so that Mass could be celebrated versus populum, the priest facing the people. The ornate high altar was left in place and intact.

Later, the original freestanding altar was replaced with a more ornate, marble one that remains in use to this day. At the same time the interior was radically modified to remove two side altars, a long altar rail, and a select portion of iconography. The lighting of the church was also renovated to allow a brighter hue.

From 2010 to 2014, St. Andrew's saw its most expensive long-term renovation. The large pipe organ, being an object of much effort to maintain, was replaced with an electric organ. The pipes, however, were retained for decoration. In 2014, the steeples, originals from the construction of the church, were removed and renovated.

On September 6, 2023, the Dicastery for Divine Worship and the Discipline of the Sacraments granted the title of minor basilica to the parish church.

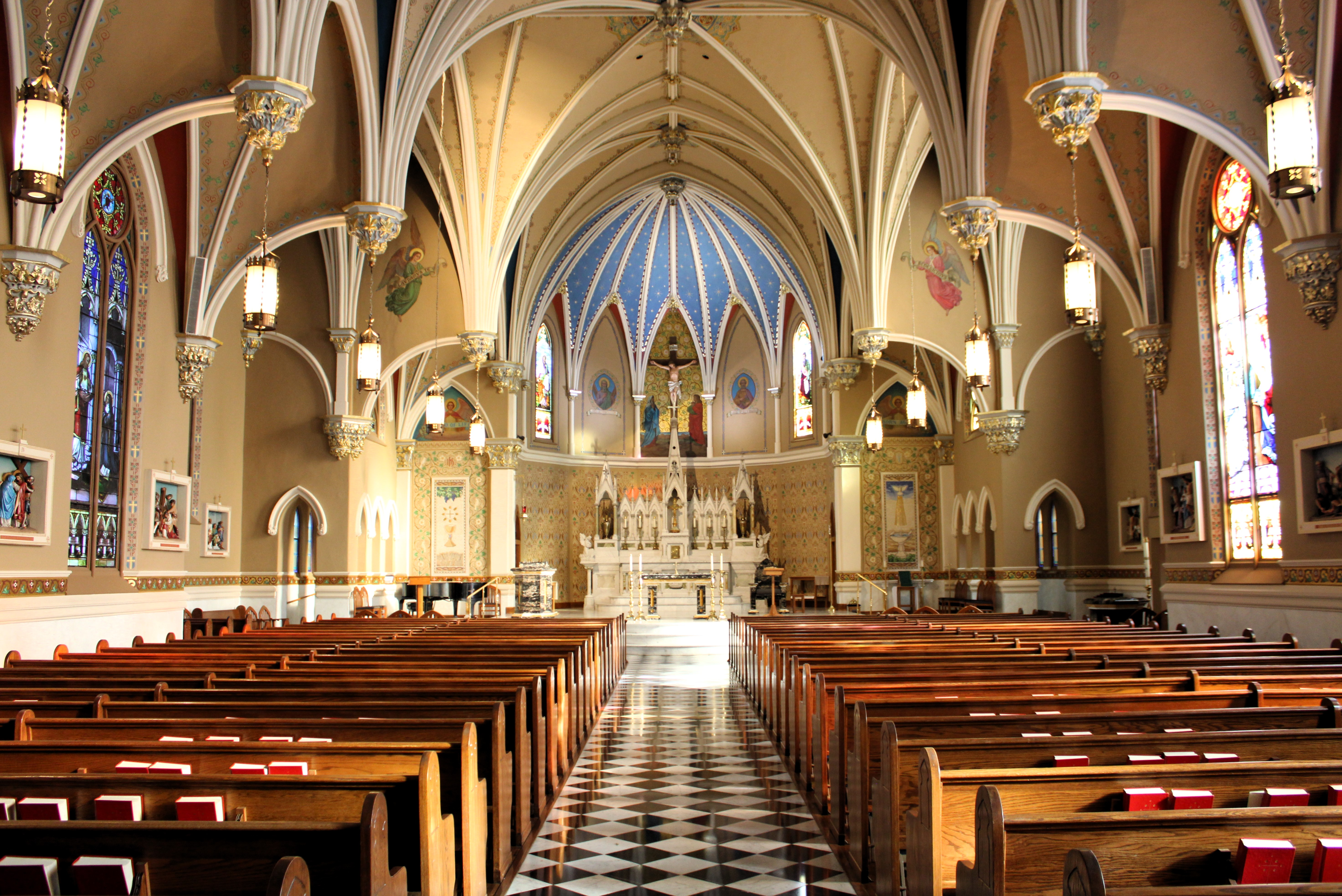
View up the nave toward the chancel

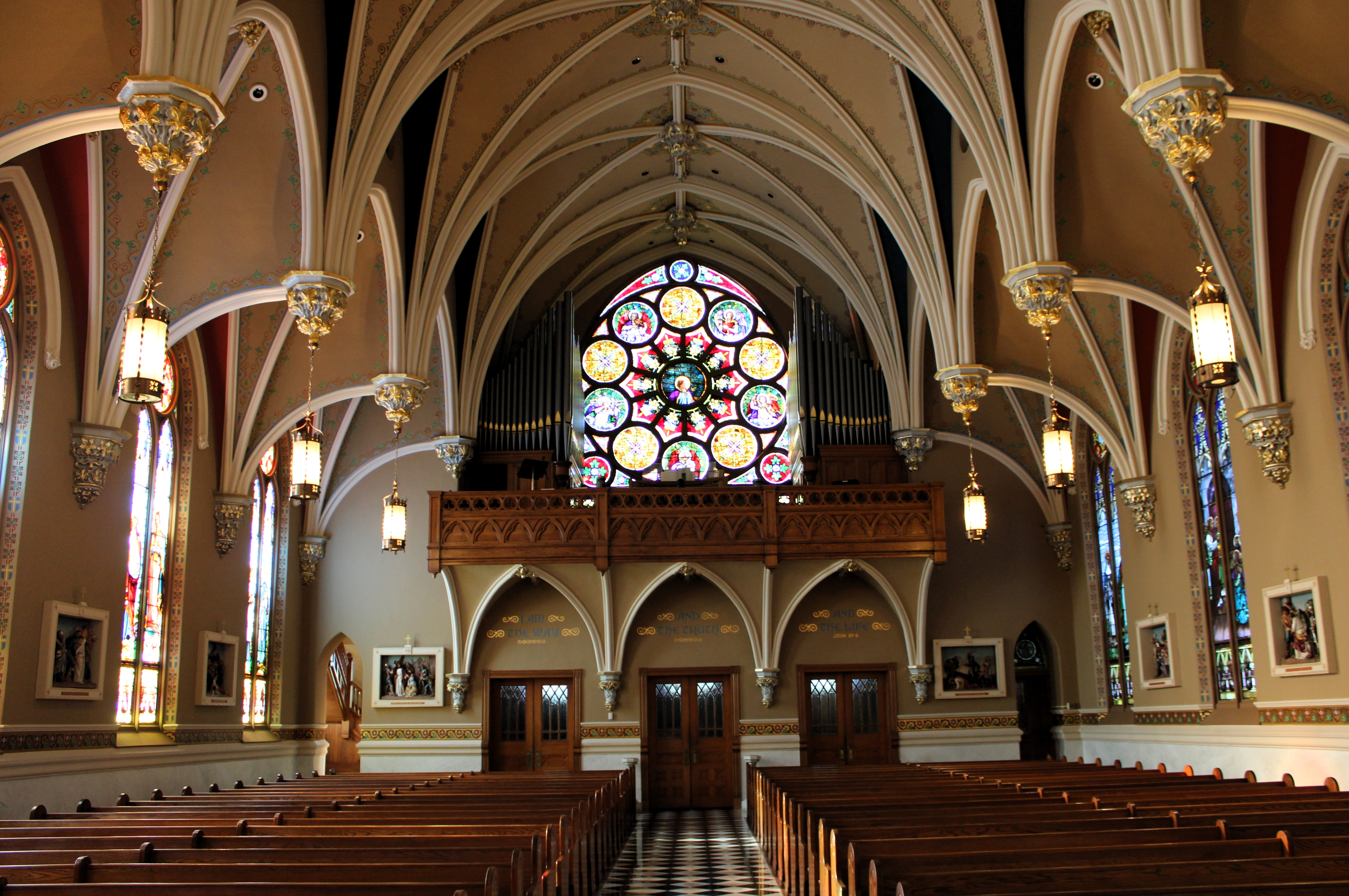
View down the nave toward gallery

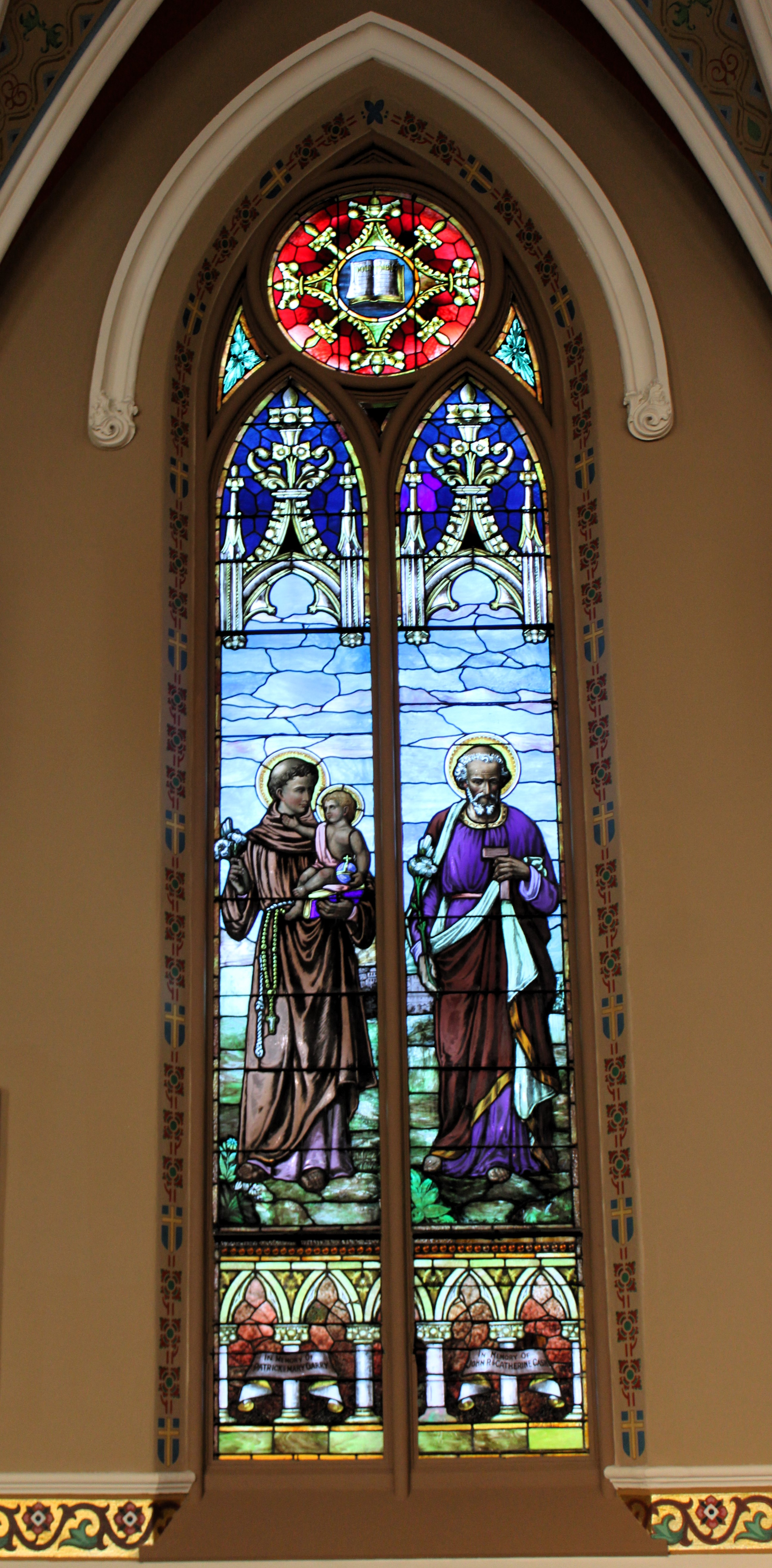
Stained glass window

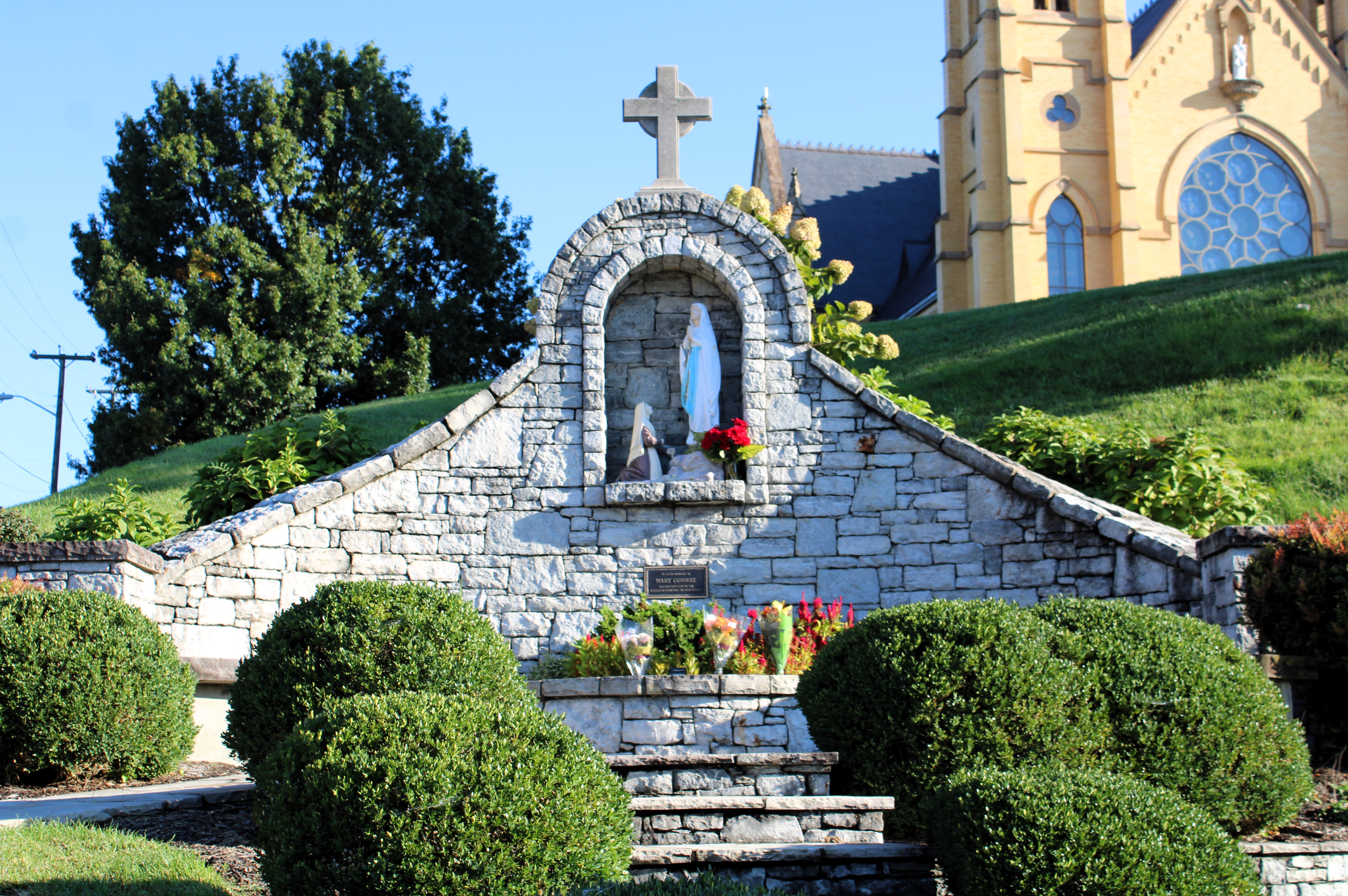
Lourdes Grotto
