= St Andrew (disambiguation) =

St Andrew most commonly refers to Andrew the Apostle, the Christian apostle and brother of Peter.

St Andrew or St Andrews may also refer to:

== People ==
- List of saints named Andrew, several people known as Saint Andrew

== Places ==
=== Asia ===
- St. Andrew's Hospital, Beijing
- St. Andrews, Kerala, India

=== Europe ===
- Saint Andrew, Guernsey, a parish in the Channel Islands
- St. Andrew's, Malta, an informal district in Pembroke, Malta
- Basilica di Sant'Andrea (Basilica and monastery of St. Andrew), Vercelli, Italy

=== United Kingdom ===
==== Scotland ====
- St Andrews, a town and former royal burgh on the east coast of Fife, Scotland, United Kingdom.
  - St Andrews (Fife ward), a Fife Council ward representing St Andrews
- St Andrews (Parliament of Scotland constituency), pre-1707
- University of St Andrews, the oldest university in Scotland, and the third-oldest university in the English-speaking world.
- St Andrews Links, 7 golf courses in St Andrews in Scotland, including the Old Course
- Old Course at St Andrews, golf course where golf has been played since the 15th century
- The Royal and Ancient Golf Club of St Andrews, one of the oldest and most prestigious golf clubs in the world, based in St Andrews in Scotland.
- St Andrews Castle, a ruined castle located in the coastal Royal Burgh of St Andrews in Fife, Scotland
- St Andrews Cathedral, a ruined cathedral located in the coastal Royal Burgh of St Andrews in Fife, Scotland
- St Andrews Burghs (UK Parliament constituency), it was a district of burghs constituency, representing various burghs of Fife, Scotland, in the House of Commons of the Parliament of the United Kingdom, from 1832 to 1918.
- St. Andrew's First Aid, a first aid charity based in Scotland
- St Andrew's House, Edinburgh, headquarters of the Scottish Executive
- St Andrews, Orkney, a parish on the island of Orkney

==== England ====
- St Andrew (Lewisham ward), a former electoral ward of Lewisham London Borough Council that existed from 1964 to 2002
- St Andrews, Bristol, a suburb of Bristol, England
- St Andrew's (stadium), the home stadium of Association football team Birmingham City F.C.
- St Andrew's Hospital, Northampton, providing psychiatric services
- St Andrew's Hospital, Bow, London, England
- St Andrew's Hospital, Dollis Hill, London, England
- St Andrews, Swindon, a civil parish in Wiltshire
- St Andrews (Swindon ward), an electoral ward in Wiltshire
- "Earl of St Andrews", a subsidiary title belonging to the Duke of Kent
- St Andrew's (Havering ward), an electoral ward representing Hornchurch on the Havering London Borough Council
- St Andrews (Brent ward), an electoral ward in Brent London Borough Council

==== Wales ====
- St Andrew, Llandaff, a private residence in Cardiff
- St. Andrews Major, a village parish in the Vale of Glamorgan

==== Northern Ireland ====
- St. Andrews (alias Ballyhalbert), a civil parish in County Down, Northern Ireland

=== North America ===
==== Canada ====
- St. Andrews Heights, Calgary, a neighbourhood in Calgary, Alberta
- Rural Municipality of St. Andrews No. 287, Saskatchewan
- Rural Municipality of St. Andrews, Manitoba
  - St. Andrews (electoral district), Manitoba
- St. Andrews West, a community in South Stormont, Ontario
- St. Andrew station, a subway station in Toronto, Ontario
- St. Andrew (provincial electoral district), Ontario
- St. Andrews, New Brunswick
- St. Andrews, Nova Scotia

==== United States ====
- Fort St. Andrews
- Andrew station, Boston
- Saint Andrew, New York
- St. Andrews, South Carolina
- Saint Andrews, Washington
- St. Andrews Bay (Florida)

=== Oceania ===
==== Australia ====
- St Andrews, New South Wales, a suburb of Sydney
- St Andrews, Victoria, a suburb of Melbourne

==== New Zealand ====
- Saint Andrews, Canterbury, a rural community in Waimate District
- St Andrews, Waikato, a suburb of Hamilton

=== Caribbean ===
- Saint Andrew, Barbados, parish
  - Saint Andrew (Barbados Parliament constituency)
- Saint Andrew County, Trinidad and Tobago
- Saint Andrew Parish (disambiguation), the name of parishes in several Caribbean nations

== Educational establishments ==
- St Andrew's Greek Orthodox Theological College, Sydney, New South Wales, Australia
- St Andrew's School (Adelaide), South Australia, Australia
- St. Andrew's College, Aurora, Ontario, Canada
- St Andrew's University (Momoyama Gakuin University), Osaka, Japan
- St. Andrew's College, Grahamstown, South Africa
- St. Andrew's School for Girls, Johannesburg, South Africa
- St Andrews International School Bangkok, Thailand
- University of St Andrews, St Andrews, Scotland, United Kingdom
- Saint Andrew's School (Boca Raton), Boca Raton, Florida, United States
- New Saint Andrews College, Moscow, Idaho, United States
- St. Andrews University, Laurinburg, North Carolina, United States

== Non-Profit Scottish Cultural Charities ==
- Saint Andrew's Society

== Ships ==
- Saint Andrew (battleship), an imperial Russian battleship
- Saint Andrew (research vessel), a Russian fisheries research vessel
- HMS St Andrew, the name of three different Royal Navy ships
- TSS St Andrew
- TrSS St Andrew

== Media ==
- St Andrew (Zurbarán), a 1635-1640 painting of the apostle, by Francisco de Zurbarán
- "St. Andrew (This Battle Is in the Air)", a song by the White Stripes from Icky Thump, 2007
- "St. Andrews", a song by Bedouin Soundclash from Street Gospels, 2007

== Other ==
- Andrew given name, is a given name

== See also ==
- St. Andrew's Church (disambiguation)
- St. Andrew's Cathedral (disambiguation)
- Saint Andrews F.C. (disambiguation), several football clubs
- St. Andrew's Parish (disambiguation)
- St. Andrew's School (disambiguation)
- Saint-André (disambiguation)
- San Andrés (disambiguation)
- San Andreas (disambiguation)
- Sveti Andrija (disambiguation)
