= Saint Andrew Parish =

Saint Andrew Parish may refer to several places:

- Saint Andrew, Barbados (parish)
- Saint Andrew (Tobago) in Tobago (parish)
- Saint Andrew Parish, Dominica
- Saint Andrew Parish, Grenada
- Saint Andrew Parish, Jamaica
- Saint Andrew Parish, Saint Vincent and the Grenadines
- Saint Andrews Parish, New Brunswick, in Canada

== See also ==
- St Andrew (disambiguation)
- St. Andrew's Church (disambiguation)
- St. Andrew's Cathedral (disambiguation)
- St. Andrew's School (disambiguation)
- San Andrés (disambiguation)
- San Andreas (disambiguation)
- Sveti Andrija (disambiguation)
