= San Andrés =

San Andrés may refer to:

- St Andrew (disambiguation), a number of Catholic saints

== Places ==
=== Argentina ===
- San Andrés (Buenos Aires), city located in General San Martín Partido, in the northern zone of Greater Buenos Aires
- San Andrés de Giles, Buenos Aires Province

=== Belize ===
- San Andrés, Belize, a village in the Corozal District

=== Bolivia ===
- San Andrés, Marbán
- San Andrés Municipality, Beni

=== Canary Islands ===
- San Andrés, Santa Cruz de Tenerife
- San Andrés y Sauces

=== Colombia ===
- Archipelago of San Andrés, Providencia and Santa Catalina, a department
  - San Andrés (island), an island in that department
  - San Andrés, San Andrés y Providencia, capital of that department
- San Andrés, Antioquia
- San Andrés–Providencia Creole

=== El Salvador ===
- San Andrés, El Salvador, an archaeological site in southwestern El Salvador

=== Guatemala ===
- San Andrés, El Petén
- San Andrés Itzapa, Chimaltenango
- San Andrés Sajcabajá, El Quiché
- San Andrés Semetabaj, Sololá
- San Andrés Villa Seca, Retalhuleu
- San Andrés Xecul, Totonicapán

=== Honduras ===
- San Andrés, Lempira

=== Mexico ===
- San Andrés, Chihuahua
- San Andrés Cholula, Puebla
- San Andrés Cohamiata, Jalisco
- San Andrés Duraznal, Chiapas
- San Andrés Larráinzar, Chiapas
- San Andrés de la Cal, Morelos
- San Andrés Tuxtla, Veracruz
- San Andrés (Mesoamerican site), Tabasco, an Olmec archaeological site

==== Oaxaca ====
- San Andrés Cabecera Nueva
- San Andrés Dinicuiti
- San Andrés Huaxpaltepec
- San Andrés Huayapam
- San Andrés Ixtlahuaca
- San Andrés Lagunas
- San Andrés Nuxiño
- San Andrés Paxtlan
- San Andrés Sinaxtla
- San Andrés Solaga
- San Andrés Teotilalpam
- San Andrés Tepetlapa
- San Andrés Yaá
- San Andrés Yutatío
- San Andrés Zabache
- San Andrés Zautla

=== Panama ===
- San Andrés, Chiriquí

=== Peru ===
- San Andrés District, subdivision in Pisco, Ica Region

=== Philippines ===
- San Andres, Catanduanes
- San Andres, Manila
- San Andres, Quezon
- San Andres, Romblon

=== Spain ===
- San Andrés (Madrid)
- San Andrés, Santa Cruz de Tenerife

=== Trinidad and Tobago ===
- Fort San Andres

=== United States ===
- San Andres Mountains, a mountain range in New Mexico

== Churches ==
- San Andrés, Calatayud, a church in Aragon, Spain
- San Andrés, Alcalá del Júcar, a church in Castilla-La Mancha, Spain

== Educational institutions ==
- Colegio San Andrés, a Peruvian high school located in Lima
- Higher University of San Andrés, a university in Bolivia
- University of San Andrés, a university in Argentina

== Ships ==
- ARC San Andres (BO 151), a survey ship in the Colombian Navy, formerly the USS Rockville, a PCE-842-class patrol vessel in the US Navy
- ARC San Andres (PO-45), a buoy-tender in the Colombian Navy, formerly the USCGC Gentian (WLB-290)

== See also ==
- San Andrés Accords, Mexico
- St Andrews (disambiguation)
- San Andreas (disambiguation)
