= St Andrew's Hospital (disambiguation) =

St Andrew's Hospital is a leading psychiatric hospital in Northampton, England.

St Andrew's Hospital may also refer to various other hospitals, including:

- St. Andrew's Hospital, Beijing, China
- St Andrew's Hospital, Bow, London, UK
- St Andrew's Hospital, Dollis Hill, London, UK
- St Andrew's Hospital, Norwich, Norfolk, UK

== See also ==
- St. Andrew's (disambiguation)
