= St Andrew's Kirk =

Saint Andrew's Kirk, St Andrew's Kirk, St. Andrew's Kirk, St. Andrews Kirk or other variations may refer to:

- St Andrew's Kirk, Launceston, Tasmania, Australia
- St. Andrews Presbyterian Kirk, Nassau, Bahamas
- St. Andrew's Kirk, Georgetown, Guyana
