= San Andrés Municipality =

San Andrés Municipality may refer to:

- San Andrés Municipality, Beni
- San Andrés, Antioquia, Colombia
- San Andrés, Lempira, Honduras
