= History of the Jews in Calatayud =

Calatayud in Spain had a large Jewish community as early as the reign of Abd al-Rahman III. In 1882, while workmen were digging the foundation of a house, they discovered a marble tombstone bearing a Hebrew inscription in memory of a certain Samuel b. Solomon, who died Marheshwan 11, 4680 (October 9, 919 CE). By the kings of Aragon, the Jews of Calatayud were granted certain privileges, among which was one with regard to the oath; and these privileges were from time to time renewed.

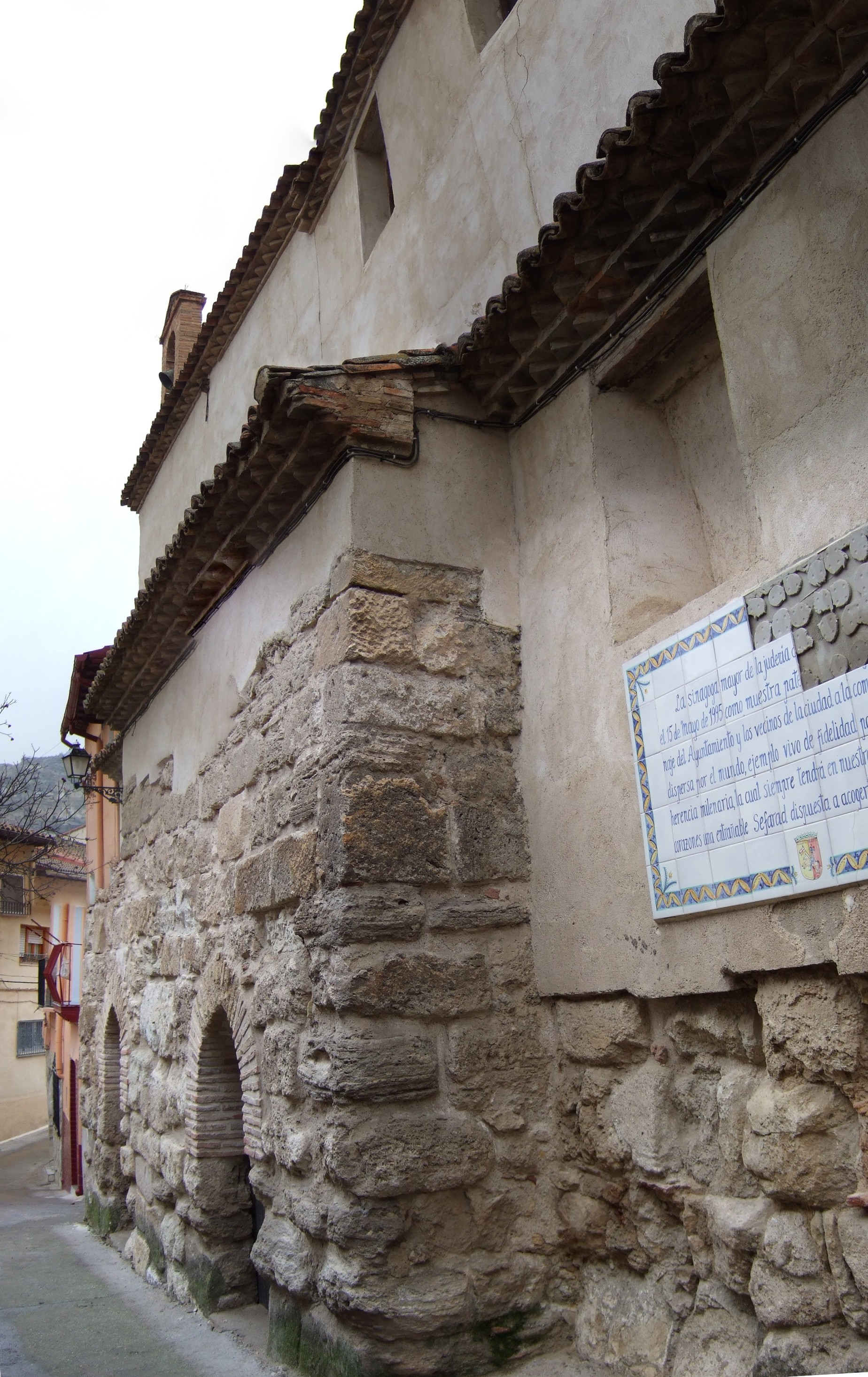
The entrance to the synagogue in Calatayud.

The Jewish quarter of Calatayud was situated in the vicinity of the river Las Pozas, and extended from St Maria de la Peña to the Torre Mocha. On the opposite side of the river lay the Jewish cemetery. The community, which, during its prosperous times, annually paid 6,000 maravedis in taxes, possessed two large synagogues, one of which, situated at the end of the Jewish street, was very beautiful. This synagogue was built by Aaron b. Yahya, and renovated by his relative, Joseph b. Yahya. There were also several large schools, two of which were founded respectively by Joseph Parhi and Jacob b. Calna.

In addition to these there was a school for the association of weavers, and another attached to the Chevra Kadisha. As the members of the congregation occasionally absented themselves from the synagogues and held prayers in private houses, the "aljama" (community) ordained that services were to be held only in the regularly constituted synagogues and schools; and that an infringement of this mandate was to be punished by a fine, one-half of which was to be donated to the crown. There were, however, two persons exempt from this law: one, the physician Don Bahiel al-Constantini, who lived some distance from the synagogue; the other, Moses b. Shaprut, whose gout prevented his attendance at the service.

In 1326, the Jews of Calatayud had indiscreetly admitted two Christians to Judaism; in consequence the former were condemned to severe punishment by the inquisitor, but later pardoned by King Jaime. In the war between Castile and Aragon in 1367, the Jews of Calatayud and Daroca, of whom the former had bravely defended their city, were subjected to great suffering at the hands of the Castilian soldiery, having their shops plundered and their children ruthlessly massacred. As a result of this war the walls of the city of Calatayud, which had been heavily damaged and partly destroyed, had to be restored; and since the Jews were willing to repair only the walls of their immediate quarter, a joint conference was held on January 11, 1390, between the city council and the representatives of the aljama (among whom were the physicians Samuel Sadoch, Jacob Azarias, and Don Samuel b. Shaprut), at which it was agreed that the Jews were to rebuild all the walls of the city, but that they were to receive reimbursement from the Christian inhabitants for all the additional money expended.

In consequence of the persecutions and the sermons of the proselytizing Vicente Ferrer, a large number of the wealthiest Jews of Calatayud in 1391, and more particularly in 1413, accepted baptism. Among the converts were the following distinguished families: the Clementes, whose progenitor was Moses Hamorro; the Santangels, descended from Azarias Ginillo; the Villanuebas, from Moses Patagon; and the children of the wealthy Samuel Vibon. Several of these persons rose to high eminence in Church and state, but many fell victims to the Inquisition.

The community, once wealthy and powerful, gradually declined, until (about fifty years before the expulsion of the Jews from Spain) it was able to pay only a modicum in taxes. Calatayud was always celebrated as a great seat of Jewish learning, and among its eminent scholars were: the grammarian Solomon ben Abraham ibn Parhon, who was born at Calatayud and was a friend of Judah ha-Levi; the rabbi Solomon Reuben, who was related to Hasdai Crescas, and had many enemies (he was finally compelled to give place to the preacher En Bima); R. David ibn Shoeib, who enjoyed the esteem of both Jewish and Christian circles, and who, like Moses Alkabetz and Don Solomon b. David, carried on a correspondence with Isaac b. Sheshet. The Nasi Samuel HaLevi and R. Moses b. Susa (the latter probably identical with the correspondent of Isaac b. Sheshet at Ucles) were the representatives of the Calatayud community at the Disputation of Tortosa. The last preacher of the congregation of Calatayud was the celebrated Isaac Arama. According to Steinschneider, the Jewish family name "Kalai" is derived from this city.
