= Conor Sheehan (disambiguation) =

Conor (or Connor) Sheehan (or Sheahan) may refer to:

- Connor Sheehan (born 1987), Bahamian soccer player
- Conor Sheahan (born 1994), Irish hurler
- Conor Sheehan, Irish politician (Limerick TD)

== See also ==
- Con Sheehan (born 1989), Irish boxer
