= Red Island =

Red Island may refer to:

- Red Island, Newfoundland and Labrador
- Red Island, Queensland
- Red Island (Antarctica)
- Rhode Island, meaning red island
- Rote Insel, neighborhood of Berlin
- Red Island (Salton Sea), a volcano in Southern California
- Red Island, former holiday camp in Skerries, Ireland
- Red Island Minerals, a company based in Madagascar
- Madagascar is often called "the red island" for its red soils
- Red Island (film), 2023 film

== See also ==
- Isola Rossa
