= San Andrés, Calatayud =

Church in Calatayud, Spain

Coordinates: 41.3551°N 1.6446°W

San Andrés, in translation, St Andrew is a Gothic-style, Roman Catholic church located in Calatayud, region of Aragon, Spain.

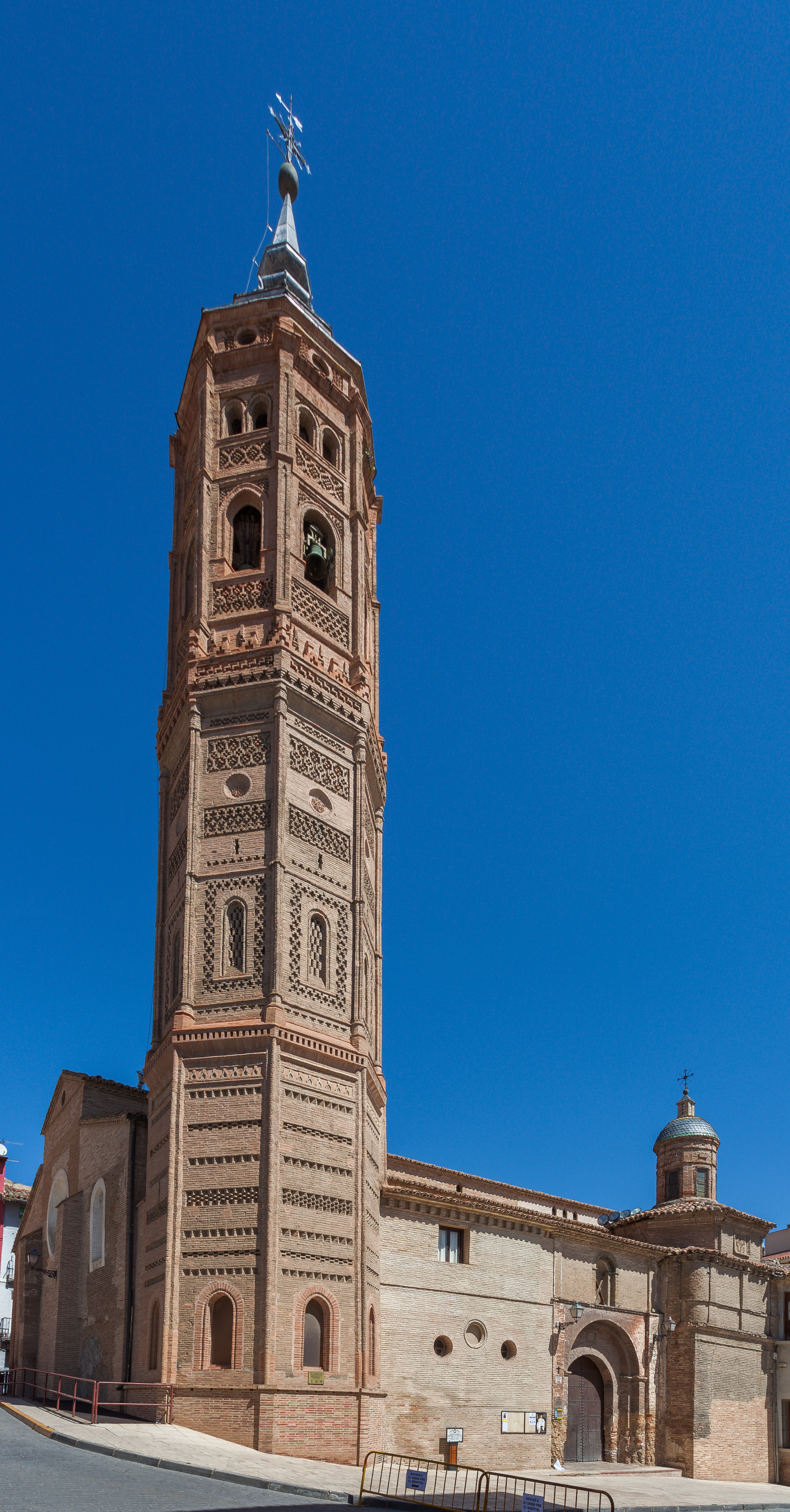
Tower

== History ==
The church was commissioned in the 12th century after the Reconquista of the town by Alfonso I el Batallador. Initially likely of Romanesque design, only traces of that church remain above the portal and in the baptismal font.

In town, this church rivaled that of the Colegiata of Santa María for veneration and attention. Documents from 1456, note that Farax and Brahem, both surnamed el Rubio (the Blond) and both Moors, signed a contract with the parishioners of the church of San Juan de Vallupie to make ciborium, no longer extant, that was to resemble that of the church of San Andrés. The bell-tower was built in 1508.

In 1870, the city hall sought to raze the dilapidated church buildings of San Miguel y de San Andrés, while preserving the Tower of San Andrés. In 1966, the church was declared of interés histórico artístico.

== Art and Architecture ==
Spherical view of the interior, click here.

The church retains its 14th-century Mudéjar layout with Gothic tracery creating elaborate star-shaped geometric lines. The aisles have four chapels: two of Mudéjar design, including the baptistry. The other two were built in the 18th century with gothic tracery ceilings.

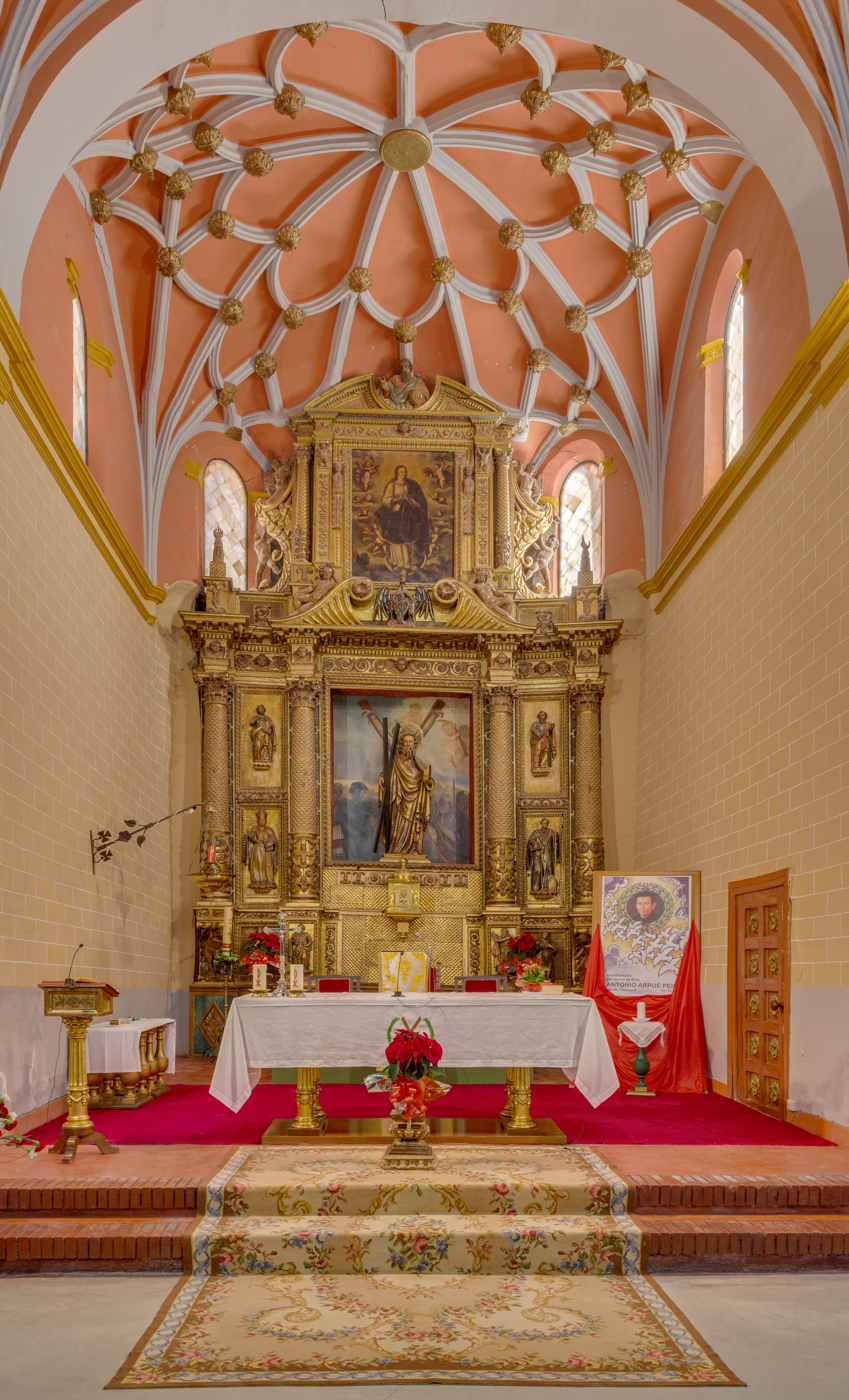
Main reredos

The main altar has a Retablo with sculptures of the evangelists Mark and Luke, and two saints. Some panels depict the Fathers of the Roman Church (Augustine, Ambrose, Hieronymus, and Gregory the Great).

The central panel has a statue of St Andrew replacing the original painted icon, and it is topped by an 18th-century canvas of the Immaculate Conception.

== Torre de San Andrés ==
Like the tower of the Santa Maria la Mayor in town, the architecture is Mudéjar. In reality, the tower is composed of two concentric towers with a stairwell inside the latter. The inner tower, hollow, houses a small octagonal chapel. It is almost certain that construction proceeded over decades if not centuries, and that the final bell-unit was not complete till the 16th century. The brickwork becomes more highly decorated in the higher stories.

== See also ==
- Mudéjar Architecture of Aragon
