= St Andrew's Primary School =

St Andrew's Primary School may refer to:

- St Andrew's Primary School (Soham)
- St Andrew's School (Bahamas)
- St Andrew's Primary School, Kilmarnock, Scotland
- St Andrew's Primary School, Bearsden, Scotland
- St. Andrew's R.C. Primary School, Falkirk, Scotland
- St Andrew's Primary School, Cullompton, Devon, England
- St. Andrews School (Virginia)

It may also refer to a number of primary schools in St. Andrews, Fife, Scotland
