= Saint-André =

Saint André (French for Saint Andrew) can refer to:

== Places ==
=== Belgium ===
- Saint-André, Wallonia, a district of the municipality of Dalhem, province of Liège

=== Canada ===
==== New Brunswick ====
- Saint-André, New Brunswick
- Saint-André Parish, New Brunswick

==== Quebec ====
- Saint-André-Avellin, Quebec
- Saint-André-d'Argenteuil, Quebec
- Saint-André-de-Kamouraska, Quebec
- Saint-André-de-Restigouche, Quebec
- Saint-André-du-Lac-Saint-Jean, Quebec

=== France ===
==== Simple names ====
- Saint-André, Gers, in the Gers département
- Saint-André, Haute-Garonne, in the Haute-Garonne département
- Saint-André, Pyrénées-Orientales, in the Pyrénées-Orientales département
- Saint-André, Savoie, in the Savoie département
- Saint-André, Tarn, in the Tarn département

==== Compound names ====
- Cléry-Saint-André, in the Loiret département
- Saint-André-Capcèze, in the Lozère département
- Saint-André-d'Allas, in the Dordogne département
- Saint-André-d'Apchon, in the Loire département
- Saint-André-d'Embrun, in the Hautes-Alpes département
- Saint-André-de-Bâgé, in the Ain département
- Saint-André-de-Boëge, in the Haute-Savoie département
- Saint-André-de-Bohon, in the Manche département
- Saint-André-de-Briouze, in the Orne département
- Saint-André-de-Buèges, in the Hérault département
- Saint-André-de-Chalencon, in the Haute-Loire département
- Saint-André-de-Corcy, in the Ain département
- Saint-André-de-Cruzières, in the Ardèche département
- Saint-André-de-Cubzac, in the Gironde département
- Saint-André-de-Double, in the Dordogne département
- Saint-André-de-l'Épine, in the Manche département
- Saint-André-de-l'Eure, in the Eure département
- Saint-André-de-la-Marche, in the Maine-et-Loire département
- Saint-André-de-la-Roche, in the Alpes-Maritimes département
- Saint-André-de-Lancize, in the Lozère département
- Saint-André-de-Lidon, in the Charente-Maritime département
- Saint-André-de-Majencoules, in the Gard département
- Saint-André-de-Messei, in the Orne département
- Saint-André-de-Najac, in the Aveyron département
- Saint-André-de-Roquelongue, in the Aude département
- Saint-André-de-Roquepertuis, in the Gard département
- Saint-André-de-Rosans, in the Hautes-Alpes département
- Saint-André-de-Sangonis, in the Hérault département
- Saint-André-des-Eaux, Côtes-d'Armor, in the Côtes-d'Armor département
- Saint-André-des-Eaux, Loire-Atlantique, in the Loire-Atlantique département
- Saint-André-les-Alpes, in the Alpes-de-Haute-Provence département
- Saint-André-lez-Lille, a commune in Lille Métropole
  - Gare de Saint-André, a railway station in Saint-André-lez-Lille

=== Réunion ===
- Saint-André, Réunion

== Other usages ==
- Saint André Bessette, a Canadian canonized in October 2010
- Saint-André cheese, French cheese
