= St. Andrew's Episcopal School =

St. Andrew's Episcopal School may refer to:

- St. Andrew's Episcopal School (Maryland) in Potomac, Maryland
- St. Andrew's Episcopal School (Mississippi) in Jackson, Mississippi
- St. Andrew's Episcopal School (Amarillo, Texas)
- St. Andrew's Episcopal School (Austin, Texas)

== See also ==
- St. Andrew's School (disambiguation)
