= Parc botanique Deau =

Private botanical garden and arboretum in Nouvelle-Aquitaine, France

Coordinates: 45.5994°N 0.7486°W

The Parc botanique Deau (2 hectares) is a private botanical garden and arboretum located on the grounds of the Domaine du Chaillaud, Saint-André-de-Lidon, Charente-Maritime, Nouvelle-Aquitaine, France. It used to be open daily but has now closed due to the incapacity of the owner and all signs directing visitors to it in the village have been removed. The garden was begun in 1984 when Colette Deau inherited a family home. It now contains more than 600 varieties of trees, shrubs, perennials, roses, cacti, succulents, and vegetables laid out in the style of an English garden with a small bridge, fountain, cascade, and lake. Sections include an antique vegetable garden, Japanese garden, and rose garden. Its tree collection includes Betula, Acer griseum, Albizia, cedar, Cornus kousa, Ginkgo, Koelreuteria, Liquidambar, Liriodendron, Magnolia, Parrotia, Quercus, Salix, Sequoia, and palm trees.

== See also ==
- List of botanical gardens in France
