= Solomon ben Abraham ibn Parhon =

Solomon ben Abraham ibn Parhon was a Spanish-Jewish philologist of the Hebrew language in the 12th century, a native of Ḳal'ah (Ḳal'at Ayyub, Calatayud), Aragon. In the preface to his lexicon he mentions as his teachers, besides a certain R. Ephraim of whom nothing more is known, the two great Spanish scholars Judah ha-Levi and Abraham ibn Ezra. Ibn Parḥon refers also to conversations with Judah ha-Levi, mentioning, for example, his remarkable assertion regarding the inadmissibility of meter in Hebrew poetry, and tells of the sojourn of Ha-Levi and Ibn Ezra in North Africa.

== The Lexicon ==
The only one of his works which has been preserved is his lexicon. In it he appears as the true pupil of Ibn Ezra, becoming, like him, the propagator of Hebrew philology and Biblical exegesis as they flourished in the Arabic language in Spain. Ibn Parḥon relates in his preface that when he came to Salerno he found the people there entirely ignorant of the products of Judæo-Spanish literature, being acquainted only with the lexicon of Menahem ibn Saruḳ. He determined, therefore, to compile a lexicon to the Bible in which the substance of that literature should be made accessible in Hebrew. He completed his work on kislev 1, 4921 (= 1160), and called it Maḥberet he-'Aruk, combining the title of the dictionary of Menahem with that of Nathan's Talmudic lexicon. Except for the original matter which Ibn Parḥon incorporated in his work, it may be considered as an extract from the lexicon of Ibn Janaḥ, supplemented by extracts from the works of Ḥayyuj, as well as from the Mustalḥaḳ and the Luma of Ibn Janaḥ.

Ibn Parḥon quotes by name only a few authorities, including Rashi and Solomon ibn Gabirol. The latter's interesting short grammatical didactic poem Anaḳ has been preserved, at least in part, in Ibn Parḥon's introduction to his lexicon. The numerous explanatory notes, which are a notable characteristic of the lexicon, make it a mine of information on historical details relating to the ritual. It contains also various scientific excursus, including some on problems of religious law. The article בעל contains a sermon on illicit intercourse with Jewish women, which throws light on the moral status of the Italian Jews; in another article, גלב, he seizes the opportunity of showing the inadmissibility of the custom of not cutting the hair, a custom prevailing in Christian countries. Twice, in the articles מנח and ערב, he attacks the practice which Jews living in Christian countries had adopted of combining the afternoon prayer with the evening prayer.

Although Ibn Parḥon introduces a few Aramaic phrases (occurring in the Talmud) to satisfy the taste of his readers, the language of his lexicon, with its pure Hebraisms and the fluency and precision of its style, betrays the influence of his teacher Ibn Ezra. The original matter contributed by Ibn Parḥon includes, in addition to the notes mentioned above, many interpretations of single Biblical passages, and numerous explanations of Biblical words by means of Neo-Hebraic and Aramaic. A brief summary of Hebrew grammar, together with an excursus on Neo-Hebraic prosody, is prefixed to the lexicon, and a number of chapters based chiefly on the Luma of Ibn Janaḥ and dealing with syntactic and stylistic peculiarities of the Bible are appended. The preface and many of the articles contain interesting data on the history of Hebrew philology.

Ten years after its appearance Ibn Parḥon's lexicon was bitterly attacked by Judah ibn Tibbon, who translated the lexicon of Ibn Janaḥ and unjustly criticized Ibn Parḥon's work as being a translation thereof. Despite this, Ibn Parḥon's lexicon became very popular in succeeding centuries, although subsequently it was forgotten, until resuscitated by S. G. Stern, who edited it according to a Vienna manuscript together with an introduction by S. L. Rapoport (Presburg, 1844).

== Jewish Encyclopedia bibliography ==
- W. Bacher, Salomon ibn Parchons Hebräisches Wörterbuch, in stade's Zeitschrift, x. 120–156, xi. 35–99;
- Steinschneider, Cat. Bodl. col. 2384;
- Winter and Wünsche, Jüdische Litteratur, ii. 190.
