= St. Andrews International School =

St. Andrews International School may refer to several schools in Thailand:

- St Andrews International School Bangkok
- St. Andrews International School, Rayong
- St. Andrews International School, Sukhumvit

== See also ==
- Saint Andrews International High School, Malawi
- St. Andrew's School (disambiguation)
