= Santuario de la Virgen de la Peña, Calatayud =

Church in Zaragoza, Spain

Coordinates: 41°21′15″N 1°38′56″W

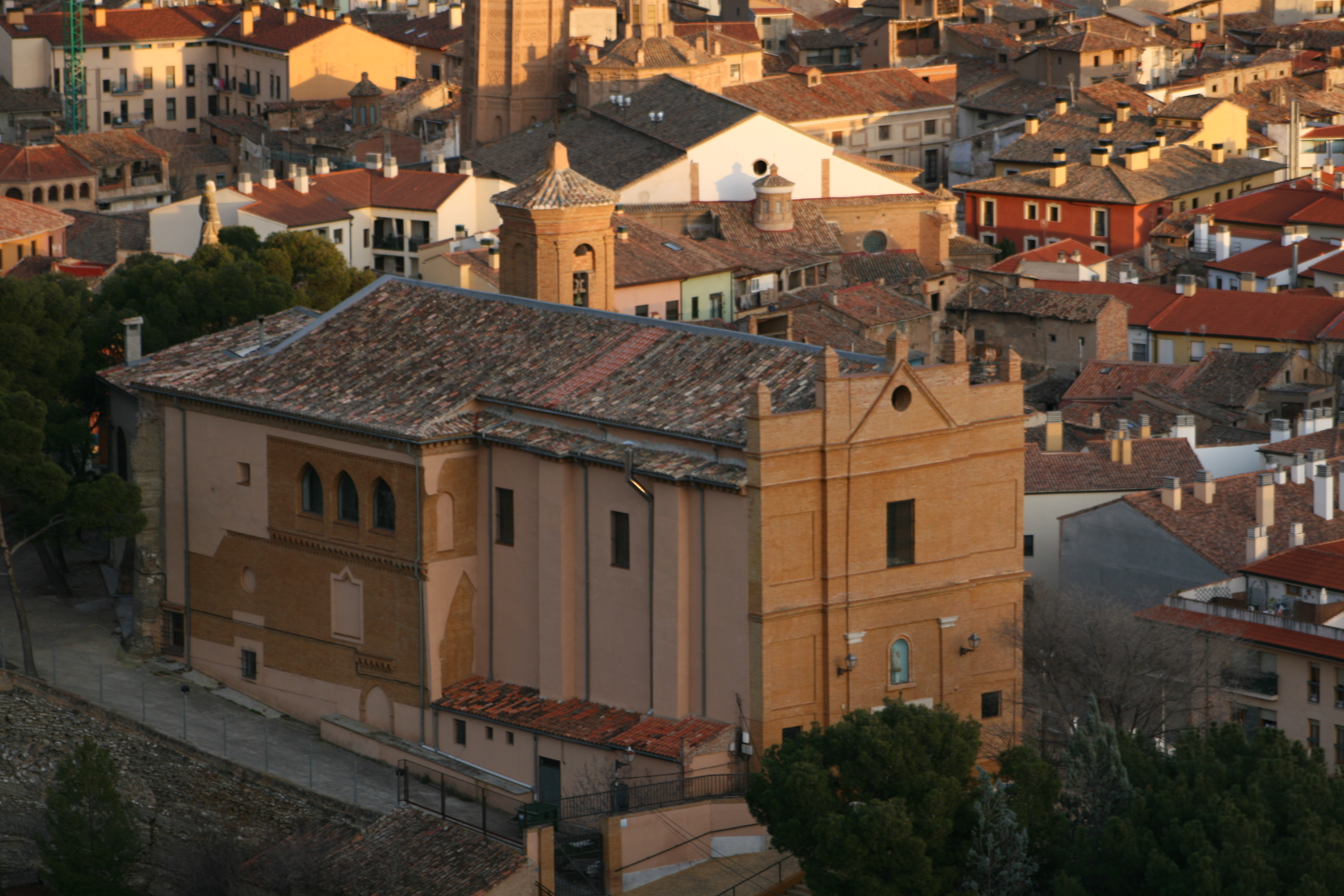

The Santuario de la Virgen de la Peña, in translation, the Sanctuary of the Virgin of the Crag is a Mudéjar-style, Roman Catholic church located on a hilltop above the town of Calatayud, region of Aragon, Spain.

== History ==
The church was built atop the site of the no longer extant Castle de la Peña, of which only ruins remain. By 1180, the church had been made a collegiate church, staffed by Augustinian canons, and was much favored by the Aragonese royalty. The church was remodeled in 1343, but had to be rebuilt after the War of the Two Peters. In 1632 the parishes of this church and Santa María la Mayor were joined, and the church ultimately passed to the order of Franciscans. In 1649, it became the Congregación de Esclavos de la Virgen de la Peña (Congregation of Slaves of the Virgen de la Peña).

In 1808, when the French forces invaded the town, they found it just abandoned by its Franciscan occupants, and took control of the site for a barracks and fort. They left it in near ruins.

In 1826, the church underwent restoration and was granted again to the Franciscans. But in 1835, during the First Carlist War, the monastery was expropriated. The confraternity of Esclavos de la Virgen de la Peña was able to obtain the property in 1838.

In 1933 during the systematic burning of churches during the Spanish Civil War, the structure and all its icons, including the ancient image of the Virgin, were destroyed by arson. Another restoration took place with new altars. The frescoes were added by the painter José Maria Rubio. The general layout of the church recalls the earlier church, but the majority of the works in the church now come from a razed convent.
