= St Andrew's Academy =

St Andrew's Academy may refer to:

- St Andrew's Academy, North Ayrshire, school in Saltcoats, Scotland from 1971 to 2007, replaced by St Matthew's Academy
- St Andrew's Academy, Paisley, school in Renfrewshire, Scotland since 1990

== See also ==
- St. Andrew's School (disambiguation)
