= St. Andrew's School =

Saint Andrew's School may refer to:

== Australia ==
- St Andrew's School (Adelaide), South Australia
- St Andrew's Cathedral School, Sydney, New South Wales, Australia
- St Andrew's Grammar School, an independent school in Dianella, West Australia

== Singapore ==
- Saint Andrew's School, Singapore, a family of schools in Singapore
  - Saint Andrew's Junior School (SAJS)
  - Saint Andrew's Secondary School (SASS)
  - Saint Andrew's Junior College (SAJC)

== South Africa ==
- St. Andrew's School, Bloemfontein
- St. Andrew's Preparatory School, Grahamstown

== United Kingdom ==
=== England ===
- St Andrew's School, Pangbourne, Berkshire
- St Andrew's School, an independent school in Medway, Kent
- St Andrew's Church of England High School, Croydon, London
- St Andrew the Apostle Greek Orthodox School, Brunswick Park, London
- St Andrew's Catholic School, Surrey
- St Andrew's High School, Worthing, West Sussex

=== Scotland ===
- St Andrews Grammar School, St Andrews, Fife; now Madras College
- St Andrews RC High School, a state school in Kirkcaldy, Fife
- St Andrew's High School, Clydebank, West Dunbartonshire
- St Andrew's High School, a state school in Coatbridge, North Lanarkshire
- St Andrew's High School, East Kilbride, South Lanarkshire; now St Andrew's and St Bride's High School
- St Andrew's Secondary School, Glasgow

== United States ==
- Saint Andrew's School (Saratoga, California)
- St. Andrew's School (Delaware)
- Saint Andrew's School (Boca Raton, Florida)
- Saint Andrew's School (Savannah, Georgia)
- St. Andrew's Schools, Hawaii
- St. Andrew the Apostle School, St. Andrew's Parish, Forest Hills, Boston, Massachusetts
- St. Andrew's Catholic School (Newtown, Pennsylvania)
- St. Andrew's School (Rhode Island)
- St. Andrew's-Sewanee School, Sewanee, Tennessee

== Elsewhere ==
- St. Andrew's Scots School, Buenos Aires, Argentina
- St Andrew's School (Bahamas)
- St. Andrew's School, Brunei
- St. Andrew's College, Aurora, Ontario, Canada
- St. Andrew's School (Manitoba), St. Andrews, Canada
- St. Andrews School (India)
- St Andrew's College, Dublin
- St. Andrews School, Turi, Kenya
- St Andrew's Service Children's Primary School (Malta), Pembroke, Malta
- St. Andrew's School (Mauritius)
- St. Andrew's School (Parañaque), Philippines

== See also ==
- St Andrew's Academy (disambiguation)
- St. Andrew's College (disambiguation)
- St. Andrew's Episcopal School (disambiguation)
- St. Andrews International School (disambiguation)
- St Andrew's Primary School (disambiguation)
