= Sveti Andrija =

Sveti Andrija (Croatian for "Saint Andrew") may refer to:

- Sveti Andrija (Dubrovnik), an uninhabited island near Dubrovnik
- Sveti Andrija (Rovinj) or Crveni otok, an island off the coast of Rovinj
- Sveti Andrija (Vis) or Svetac, an island near the island of Vis

== See also ==
- Saint Andrew (disambiguation)
