= Isola Rossa =

Isola Rossa in Italian means red island and may refer to:

- Isola Rossa (France), municipality in Corsica
- Isola Rossa (Trinità d'Agultu e Vignola), town in the Trinità d'Agultu e Vignola municipality, in the north Sardinia
- Isola Rossa (Trinità d'Agultu e Vignola), island in the Trinità d'Agultu e Vignola municipality, in the north Sardinia
- Isola Rossa (Monte Argentario), a small island next to the south-west coast of the Monte Argentario, Tuscany
- Isola Rossa (Teulada, Italy), a small island next to coast of Teulada municipality, in the south Sardinia
- Crveni otok, Croatian island also called Isola Rossa
