= San Andrés, Marbán =

San Andrés
- Location in Bolivia
- Coordinates: 14°57′S 64°28′W
- Country: Bolivia
- Department: Beni Department
- Province: Marbán Province
- Time zone: UTC-4 (BOT)

San Andrés is a town in Marbán Province in the Beni Department of northern Bolivia. It is the capital of San Andrés Municipality.
