= St. Andrew's College =

St. Andrew's College may refer to:

Australia and New Zealand

- St Andrews Christian College, Melbourne, Australia
- St Andrew's College, University of Sydney, a university college in Australia
- St Andrews College (Marayong), a high school in Australia
- St Andrew's College, Christchurch, New Zealand

Canada

- St. Andrew's College, Manitoba
- St. Andrew's College, Aurora
- St. Andrew's College, Saskatoon
- St. Andrew's College, Prince Edward Island, predecessor of St Dunstan's College

Great Britain

- St Andrew's College, Cambridge, England
- St Andrew's College, Drygrange, Scotland
- St Andrew's College of Education, Bearsden, Scotland

India

- St. Andrew’s College of Arts, Science and Commerce, Mumbai

Ireland

- St Andrew's College, Dublin

== Singapore ==
- Saint Andrew's Junior College, Potong Pasir, Singapore

South Africa

- St. Andrew's College, Grahamstown

== United States ==
- New Saint Andrews College, Moscow, Idaho
- St. Andrews Presbyterian College, Laurinburg, North Carolina

== See also ==
- St. Andrew's School (disambiguation)
