= Crveni Otok =

Island in Croatia

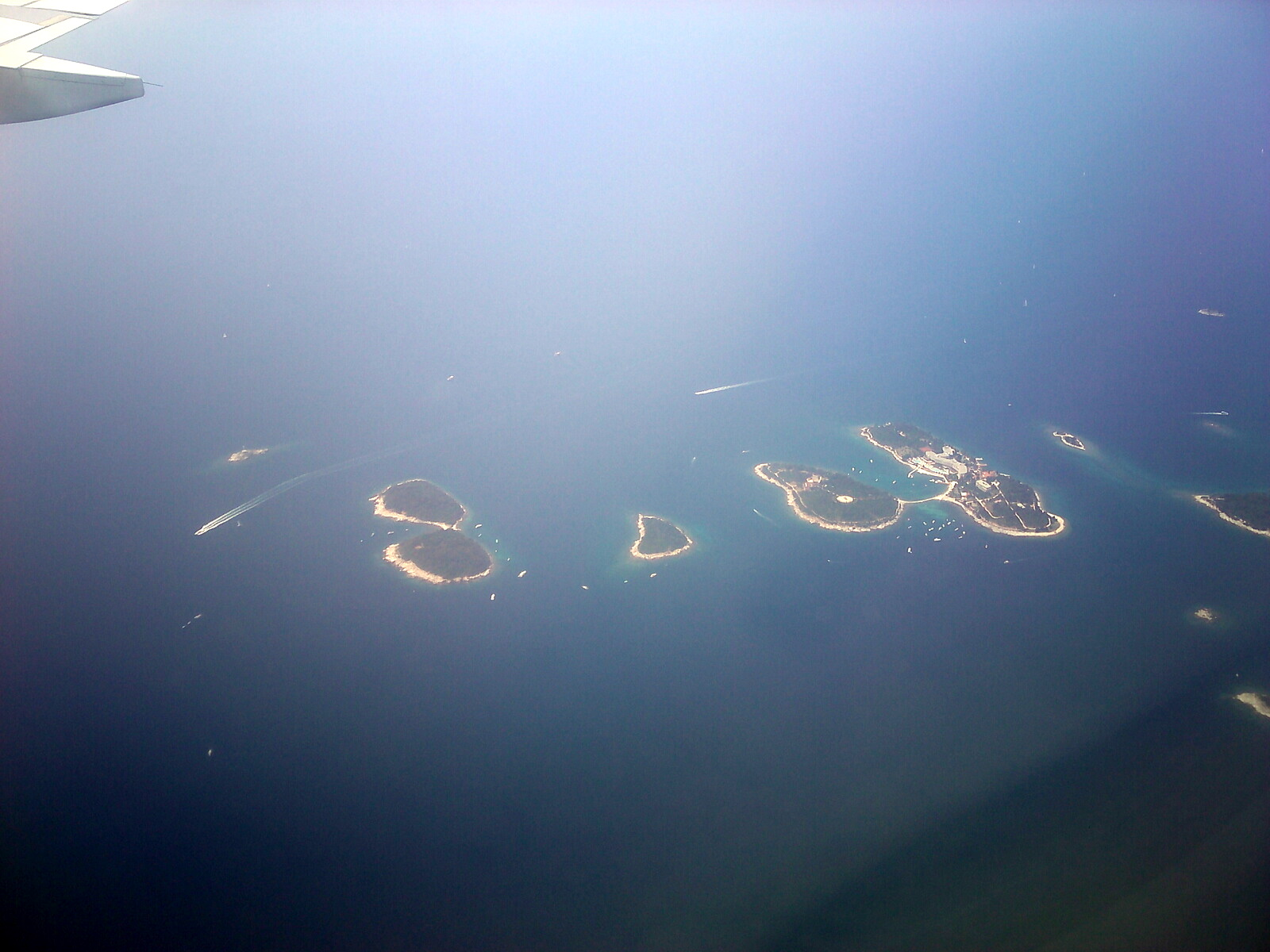
- Crveni Otok (the two connected islands to the right)
- Interactive map of Crveni Otok

Geography
- Location: Adriatic Sea
- Coordinates: 45.059392°N 13.624501°E
- Area: 0.24 km^{2} (0.093 sq mi)

Administration
- Croatia
- County: Istria County

Crveni Otok (Italian: Isola Rossa, lit. 'Red Island') is a twinned island in the Croatian part of the Adriatic Sea. It is situated near Rovinj and connects the island of Sveti Andrija (Croatian for "Saint Andrew", Italian: Isola di Sant'Andrea) with neighbouring islet of Maškin with an embankment. Its area is 0.233 km^{2} (0.090 sq mi).

== History ==
The island was probably inhabited in prehistory. In the 6th century, Benedictines built a monastery on the island. The Benedictines left the island in the 13th century and in the 15th century it was taken over by Franciscans who renovated the church and the monastery. In 1809, the island was conquered by France, and in 1892 a cement and lime factory was built on the island using the church tower as a chimney.
