= Saint-André-de-Lidon =

- Commune
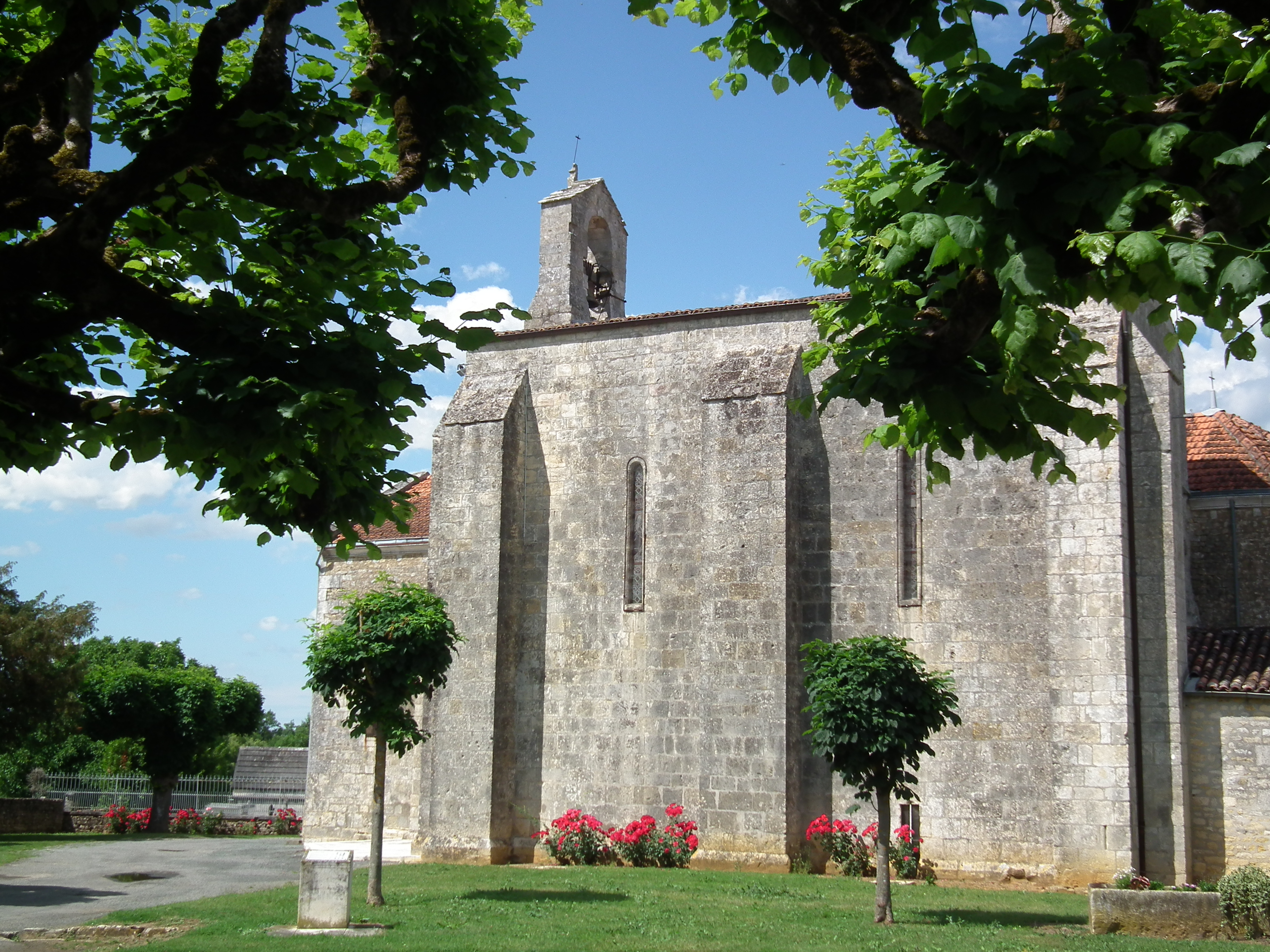
- The church in Saint-André-de-Lidon
- Location of Saint-André-de-Lidon
- Location within France Location within Nouvelle-Aquitaine
- Coordinates: 45°35′58″N 0°44′55″W
- Country: France
- Region: Nouvelle-Aquitaine
- Department: Charente-Maritime
- Arrondissement: Saintes
- Canton: Saintonge Estuaire

Government
  - Mayor (2020–2026): Alain Puyon
- Area^{1}: 23.83 km^{2} (9.20 sq mi)
- Elevation: 39 m (128 ft)
- Highest elevation: 51 m (167 ft)
- Lowest elevation: 15 m (49 ft)
- Population (2023): 1,272
  - Density: 53.38/km^{2} (138.2/sq mi)
- Time zone: UTC+01:00 (CET)
  - Summer (DST): UTC+02:00 (CEST)
- INSEE/Postal code: 17310 /17260
- ^{1} French Land Register data, which excludes lakes, ponds, glaciers > 1 km^{2} (0.386 sq mi or 247 acres) and river estuaries.

Saint-André-de-Lidon (French pronunciation: [sɛ̃.t‿ɑ̃dʁe də lidɔ̃]) is a commune in the Charente-Maritime department in southwestern France.

== Population ==
Historical population
Year	Pop.	±% p.a.
1968	773	—
1975	789	+0.29%
1982	795	+0.11%
1990	810	+0.23%
1999	846	+0.48%
2007	897	+0.73%
2012	1,020	+2.60%
2017	1,105	+1.61%
2023	1,272	+2.37%
Source: INSEE

== Sights ==
- Parc botanique Deau

== See also ==
- Communes of the Charente-Maritime department
