= Connor Sheehan =

Bahamian footballer

Personal information
- Date of birth: 7 June 1987 (age 39)
- Place of birth: Nassau, Bahamas
- Height: 5 ft 9 in (1.75 m)
- Position: Forward

Youth career
- 1999–2005: St Andrew's
- 2005: Crewe Alexandra
- 2006: Dallas Texans

College career
Years	Team	Apps	(Gls)
2006–2007	North Florida Ospreys	12	(0)

Senior career*
Years	Team	Apps	(Gls)
2009	Caledonia		
2009–2012	Paint Fair Silver Bullets		
2012–	Bombastic FC	5	(2)

International career
2008–	Bahamas	6	(0)
- * Club domestic league appearances and goals

Connor Sheehan (born 7 June 1987) is a Bahamian international soccer player, who most recently played in the Vancouver Metro Soccer League for Bombastic FC.

== Playing career ==
=== Club ===
Sheehan started his career with the School soccer team of the Nassau-based St. Andrew's School. He joined than in the summer of 2005 to UK based Crewe Alexandra F.C. After a half year left England and moved in the spring of 2006 to the United States. Now in the USA signed for Dallas Texans Soccer Club, which he won with the club, the 2006 competition of the Dallas Cup. After a half year with Dallas Texas, left his club for his studies and signed for the University of North Florida. He played here the 2006/2007 NCAA season with the UNF Ospreys men soccer team. Sheehan graduated 2009 and returned to the Bahamas to win the cup with Caledonia FC and played for the Paint Fair Silver Bullets, before joined in September 2012 in the Vancouver Metro Soccer League to Bombastic FC.

=== International ===
He made his international debut for Bahamas in a March 2008 FIFA World Cup qualification match against the British Virgin Islands and has, as of March 2016, earned a total of 6 caps, scoring no goals. All of his 4 matches were in World Cup qualification.
