= San Andrés, Alcalá del Júcar =

Church in Alcala del Jucar, Spain

San Andrés is a 15th-century, Roman Catholic parish church located in the town of Alcalá del Júcar in the province of Albacete in the autonomous community of Castile-La Mancha, Spain.

Construction of the church begun sometime in the 15th century, soon after the Reconquista of the territory, and is located in this vertiginous town constructed adjacent to a cliff wall. The church is located adjacent to Roman bridge over the River Júcar. Retaining a simple stone exterior with a tall bell-tower in the facade, the interior has undergone a variety of late gothic and neoclassic architectural refurbishments. It is formed of a single nave. The dome of the crossing is coated with green tiles. The main retablo with paintings and wooden icon is a neoclassic creation.
