= Saint Andrew (Zurbarán) =

Painting by Francisco de Zurbarán

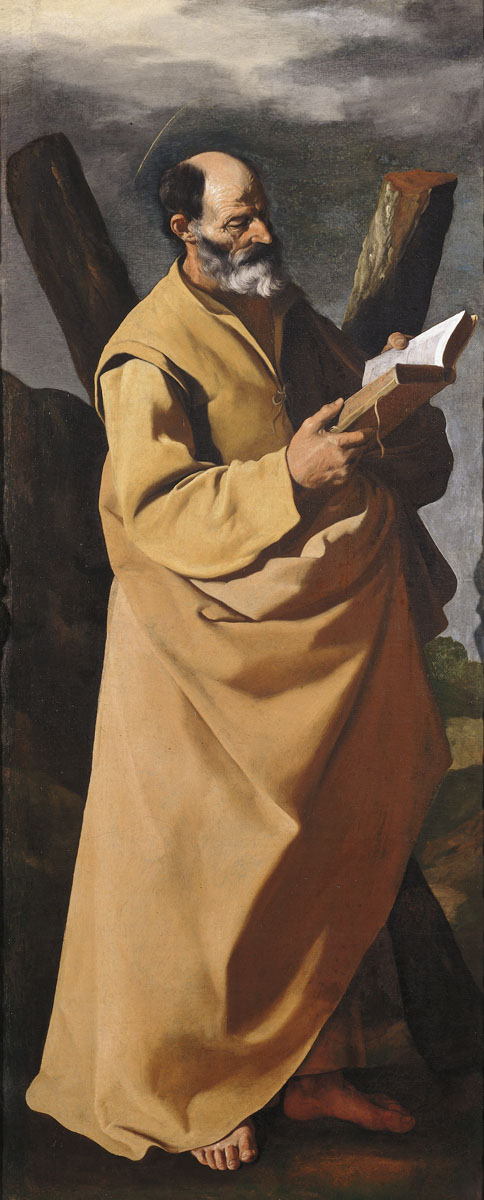
- Artist: Francisco de Zurbarán
- Year: 1635–1640
- Medium: Oil on canvas
- Dimensions: 146 cm × 60 cm (57 in × 24 in)
- Location: Museum of Fine Arts, Budapest

Saint Andrew is a painting of 1635–1640 by Francisco de Zurbarán of the apostle Andrew. Since 1949 it has been part of the collection of the Museum of Fine Arts in Budapest, Hungary.

== The Apostle Andrew ==
The New Testament describes how Andrew and his brother Simon Peter, who were fishermen on the Sea of Galilee, met Jesus and became his first followers. Later, Andrew would be present at many important events in Jesus's life. After his death, according to tradition, Andrew preached around the Black Sea, before his execution in Patras on the Peloponnese, tied to a Latin cross. During the Middle Ages, it became a common belief that Andrew had died on an X-shaped cross, the symbol of which has come to bear his name, because he did not consider himself worthy to suffer on the same cross as Christ.

== Description ==
The veneration of Andrew is likely to have reached Spain during the reign of Charles V. Zurbarán depicts him in the style of the Counter-Reformation, without other characters and with his attributes clearly visible. He holds a book in both hands, a common symbol of the apostles. Behind him, an X-shaped cross of rough wood is visible under a heavily cloudy sky. His appearance is very similar to the traditional depiction of Peter, his brother.

== History ==
This painting probably comes from the college of Santo Tomás in Seville, although there is no conclusive evidence for this. The college, founded by the Archbishop of Seville at the beginning of the sixteenth century, was difficult for outsiders to access, so there are few known descriptions of it. It is well known that there was a chapel there dedicated to Saint Andrew, which was a rarity in Seville. It is very likely that a painting of the Archangel Gabriel, which is the same size, was a pendant to the Saint Andrew.

During the French occupation, many works of art were taken from churches and monasteries. In 1810, Marshal Soult was able to take possession of the work. In 1835 it was sold to the Duke of Sutherland and kept in London. On July 11, 1913, it was sold to the London art dealership Knoedler and Co., where it was bought by the Hungarian collector Baron Ferenc Hatvany, who took it to Budapest. It was later acquired by the Jewish collector Baron Leopold Herzog, who also kept in Budapest, until it was confiscated during the Nazi occupation of Hungary in 1944. The Communist Hungarian government refused to return the artwork after the war, and it was admitted to the Museum of Fine Arts in Budapest in 1949. The heirs of Leopold Herzog brought a lawsuit against the Hungarian state in 2010 to regain possession of his collection, including the Saint Andrew; the claim remained unresolved as of October 2020.
