= Saint Andrews F.C. =

St Andrews FC, Saint Andrew's F.C., or St. Andrews F.C. may refer to the following football clubs:

- St Andrews F.C. (England), based in Aylestone, Leicester, England
- St Andrews F.C. (London), based in London, England
- St. Andrews F.C. (Malta), based in St. Andrew's, Pembroke, Malta
- St. Andrew's F.C., based in Fontana, Gozo, Malta
- Luqa St. Andrew's F.C., based in Luqa, Malta
- St. Andrew's Athletic Club, Barracas, Buenos Aires, Argentina
- St Andrews University F.C., St Andrews, Scotland
- St Andrews United F.C., St Andrews, Scotland
- Presteigne St. Andrews F.C., Presteigne, Wales
- St. Andrews FC, now called Red Sox Manawatu, Palmerston North, New Zealand
- St Andrew's F.C. (Kilmarnock), a 19th-century team based in Kilmarnock
- St Andrew's F.C. (Glasgow), a 19th-century team based in east Glasgow
- St Andrew's F.C., formerly called Pollokshields F.C., a 19th-century Scottish football team based in Glasgow
- St Andrews University F.C., based in St Andrews, Scotland

== See also ==
- St Andrew's (stadium), home of Birmingham City F.C.
- Luxol St Andrews Futsal Club, St Andrews, Malta
- University of St Andrews RFC, St Andrews, Scotland
- St. Andrews Knights football, St. Andrews University, Laurinburg, North Carolina, USA
