= St Andrew's Cathedral =

St. Andrew's Cathedral, or the Cathedral Church of St. Andrew, may refer to:

In Australia:

- St Andrew's Cathedral, Sydney

In Canada:

- St. Andrew's Cathedral (Victoria, British Columbia)

In England:

- Rochester Cathedral, before 1642
- Wells Cathedral, otherwise the Cathedral Church of St Andrew, Wells

In France:

- Avranches Cathedral, destroyed in early 19th century
- Bordeaux Cathedral, dedicated to St Andrew

In Greece:

- St Andrew's Cathedral, Patras

In Japan:

- St. Andrew's Cathedral, Tokyo
- St. Andrew's Cathedral (Yokohama)

In the Philippines:

- St. Andrew's Cathedral, Parañaque

In Russia:

- Saint Andrew's Cathedral, Kronstadt
- Saint Andrew's Cathedral (Saint Petersburg)

In Scotland:

- St Andrew's Cathedral, Aberdeen
- St Andrew's Cathedral, Dundee
- St Andrew's Cathedral, Glasgow
- St. Andrew's Cathedral, Inverness
- St Andrew's Cathedral, St Andrews

In Singapore:

- St Andrew's Cathedral, Singapore

In Spain:

- Cathedral of St Andrew and St Demetrius

In Ukraine:

- St. Andrew's Cathedral, Kyiv

In the United States:

- Cathedral of St. Andrew (Little Rock, Arkansas)
- Cathedral Church of Saint Andrew (Honolulu), Hawaii
- St. Andrew's Cathedral (Silver Spring, Maryland)
- Cathedral of Saint Andrew (Grand Rapids, Michigan)
- St. Andrew's Cathedral (Jackson, Mississippi)
- St. Andrew's Cathedral, Philadelphia, Pennsylvania

== See also ==
- St. Andrew's Church (disambiguation)
- Saint Andrew Parish (disambiguation)
