= St. Andrews Presbyterian Kirk =

Coordinates: 25.075979°N 77.343412°W

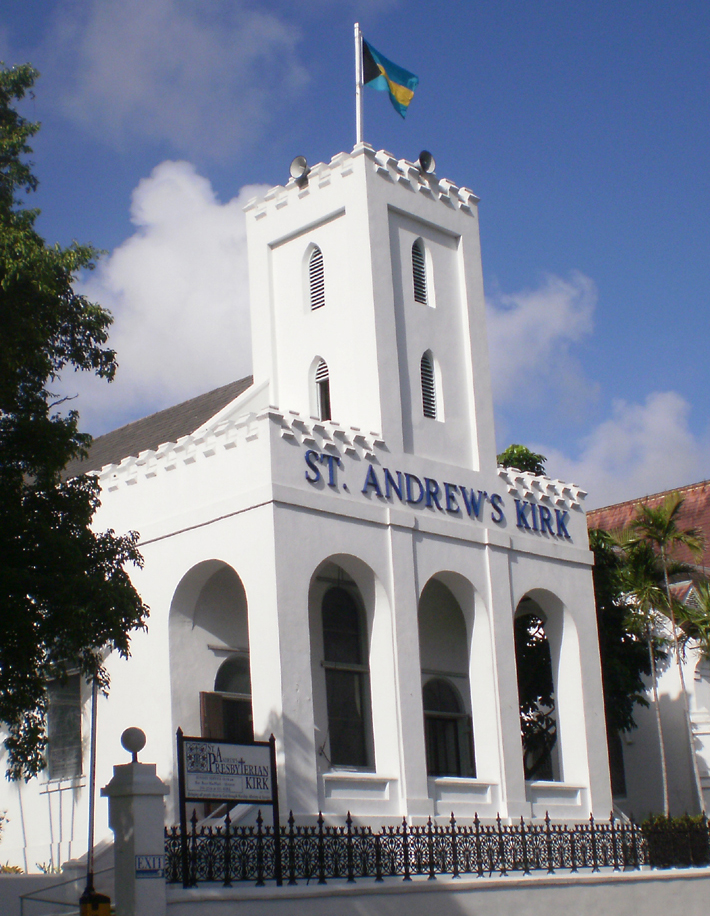
St. Andrews Kirk

St. Andrew's Presbyterian Kirk is a historic church in downtown Nassau, Bahamas.

== Early years ==
The church was founded by fifty-five Scottish Presbyterian settlers in 1798 under the name St. Andrew Society. Under the direction of Rev. John Rae, the church began conducting services in the Court House in January 1810. The foundation stone of the kirk was laid on 7 August 1810.

In 1842, a session room was added to the kirk, increasing its facilities and enabling it to accommodate the growing congregation and its activities. In the 1890s, the first manse was started on East Hill Street above the Kirk.

== Centenary ==
As the first centenary of St. Andrew's Kirk approached in 1910, the Ladies Society of the kirk prevailed upon Charles Stuart Rae to document the first 100 years of the kirk's existence in the Bahamas, which he did in a book entitled A Short History of St. Andrew's Presbyterian Church.

Rae noted the existence of a Sunday school at the kirk, with over one hundred scholars. The “Kirk Sabbath School” was reported to be one of six Sabbath Schools in the town.

== The Quarry Mission School ==
In 1872, the kirk initiated a mission school in Bain Town to provide religious instruction on Sunday afternoons for young people in the area who were not affiliated with other Sunday Schools.

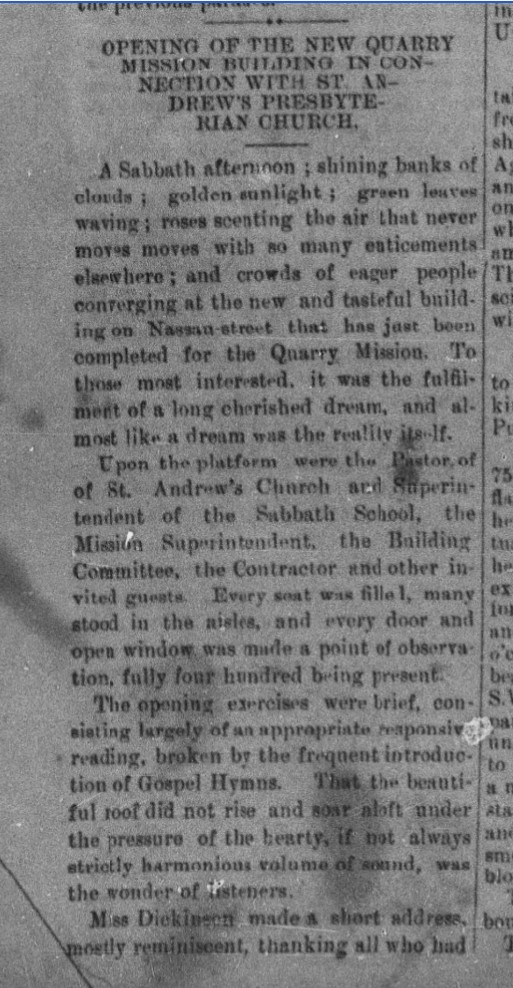
Report of the opening of the Quarry Mission School on January 8th 1893 Nassau Guardian Col 1

This school laid the foundations for the Quarry Mission School, which was founded in 1881 by Miss Emily Dickenson of Fairport, New York, in connection with St. Andrew's Kirk. A report of the opening of the Quarry Mission School on 8 January 1893 was published in the Nassau Guardian.

Dickenson was assisted by the teachers of St. Andrew's Sunday School and the school's efforts were so successful that a new building was built.

In the early 20th century, Emily Frances Higgs (sister of Sir George H. Gamblin, President of the Legislative Council and a church elder) held afternoon classes at the Quarry Mission School, assisted by teachers from St. Andrew's Sunday School. This venture came to an end in 1925 when the property was acquired by the Board of Education.

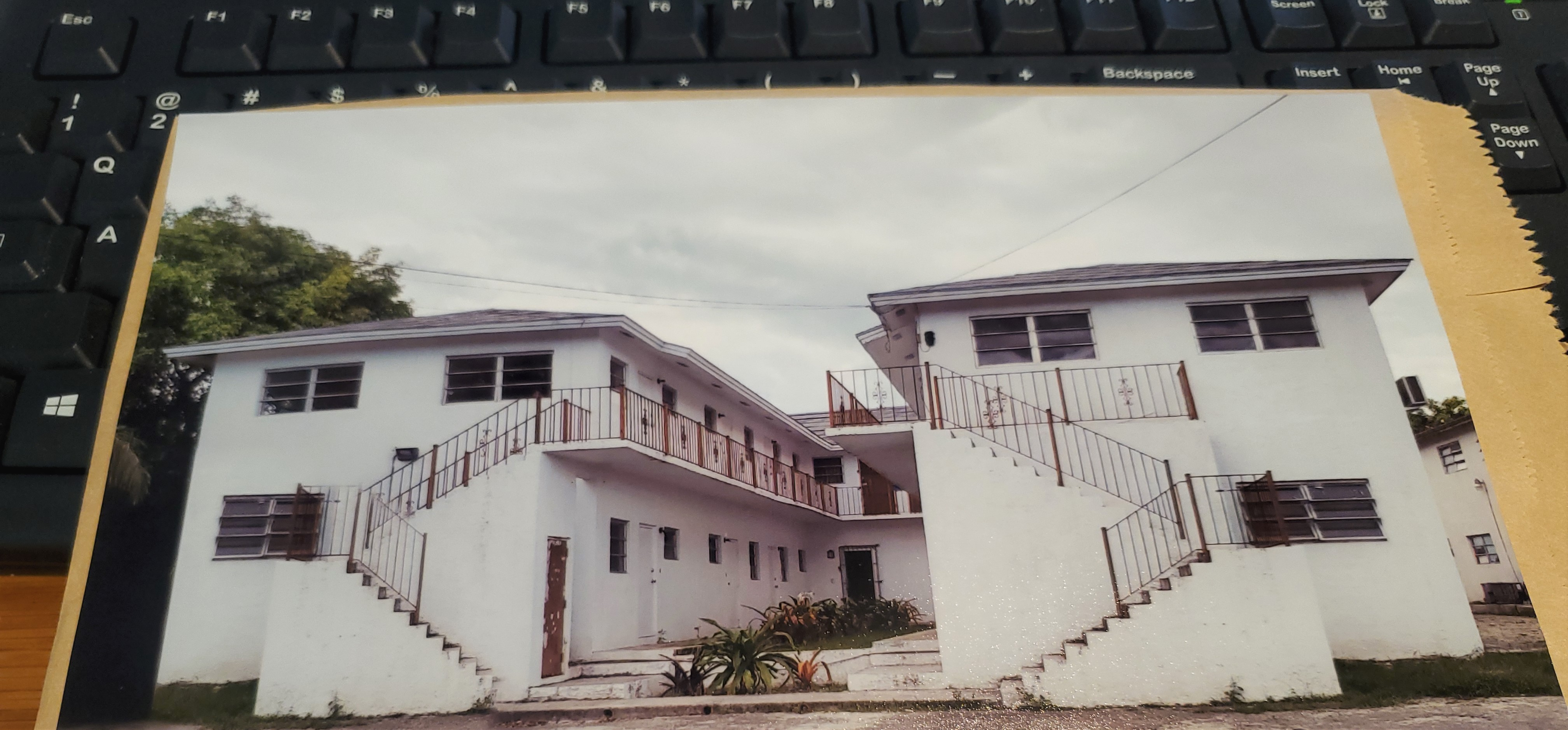
In 1891, the year that the Rev. Robert T. Bailey was appointed to St. Andrew's Church, the 'Quarry Mission School" in Nassau Street was founded by Miss Emily Dickenson, of Fairport, New York, in connection with the Kirk.

The two buildings that comprised the Quarry Mission School have since been converted into residential apartments.

== Community outreach ==
Throughout its history, St. Andrew's Kirk has demonstrated a commitment to education and community outreach. The church played a role in the establishment of the first Nassau company of the Boys' Brigade in 1909 and St. Andrew's School in 1948 under the leadership of Rev. J. Herbert Poole.

During the ministry of Rev. James Jack, Lucaya Presbyterian Kirk was founded in Freeport, Grand Bahama in 1968. In 1994, another mission charge, Kirk of the Pines, was created in Marsh Harbour, Abaco.

== Affiliation ==
St. Andrew's Kirk adheres to the Westminster Confession of Faith, Apostles' Creed and the Nicene Creed and has several house fellowships. For several years, it was affiliated with the Church of Scotland but, in 2010, it changed affiliation and is now affiliated with the Evangelical Presbyterian Church. Lucaya Presbyterian Church in Grand Bahama is also affiliated with the Evangelical Presbyterian Church.

== Memorials ==
The two stained glass windows, on either side of the Kirk platform and Communion Table, are dedicated to the memory of Emily Frances Higgs.

There is a memorial plaque to the Hon. Henry Stevenson on the southeast wall of St. Andrew's Kirk. Stevenson is suspected to have been the church's first of several coloured elders.

== Legacy and present day ==
St. Andrew's Kirk remains an essential part of the religious and historical fabric of the Bahamas, preserving its Presbyterian traditions while actively contributing to the spiritual growth and well-being of its congregation and community.
