= Colegiata de Santa Maria la Mayor, Calatayud =

Roman Catholic church in Aragon, Spain

Collegiate church of Santa María
- Colegiata de Santa María
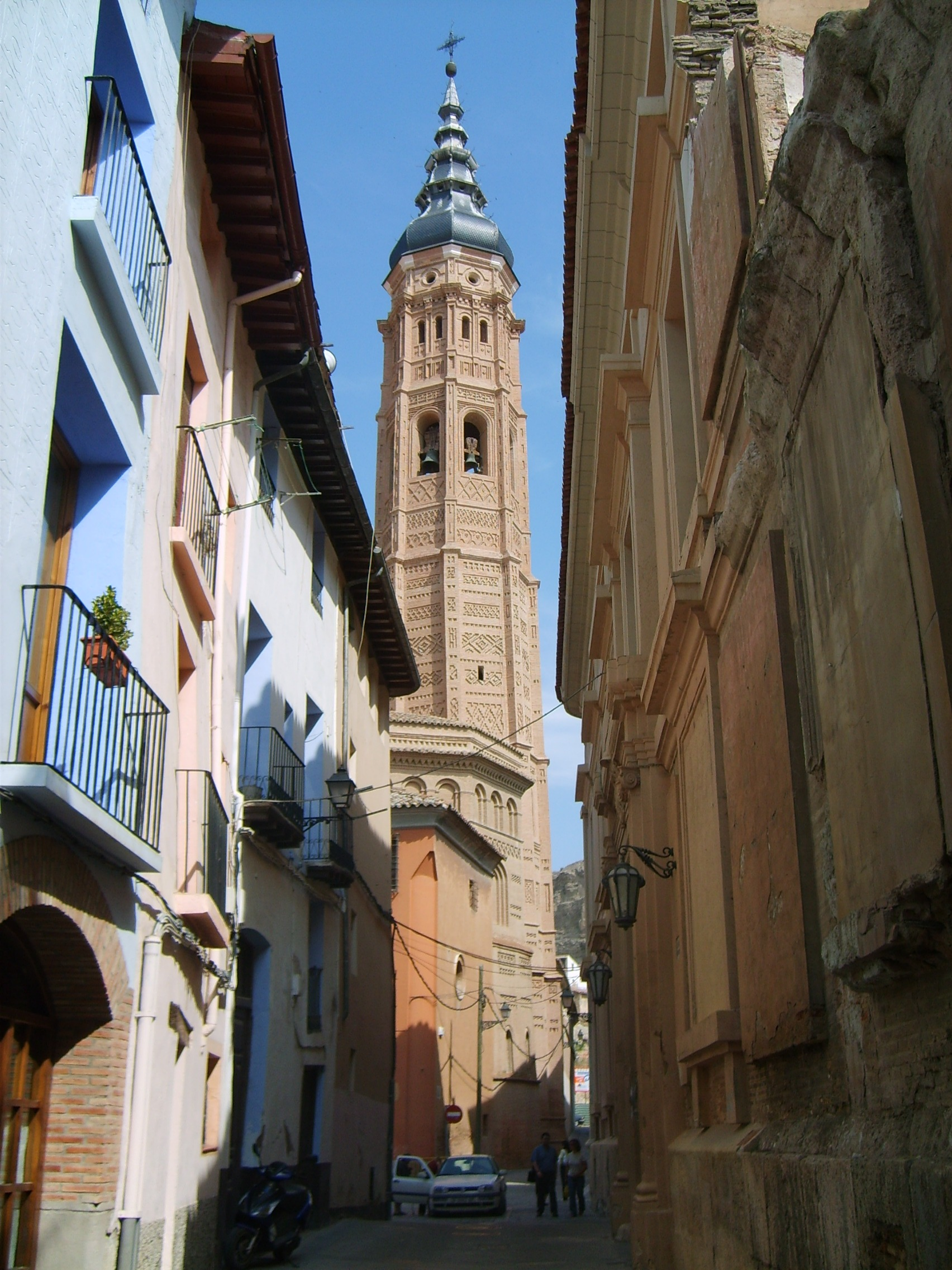

- Location within Spain

Religion
- Affiliation: Roman Catholic Church
- Status: Church

Location
- Location: Calatayud (Zaragoza), Spain
- Interactive map of Collegiate church of Santa María
- Coordinates: 41.354056°N 1.645056°W

UNESCO World Heritage Site
- Official name: Apse, cloister and tower of Colegiata de Santa María
- Part of: Mudéjar Architecture of Aragon
- Criteria: Cultural: (iv)
- Reference: 378ter
- Inscription: 1986 (10th Session)
- Extensions: 2001, 2016

Spanish Cultural Heritage
- Official name: Colegiata de Santa María
- Type: Non-movable
- Criteria: Monument
- Designated: 14 June 1884
- Reference no.: RI-51-0000042

The Colegiata de Santa Maria la Mayor, in translation, the Collegiate church of St Mary Major is a mudéjar-gothic style, Roman Catholic church located in Calatayud, in Aragon, Spain.

== History ==
The church was commissioned in the 12th century after the Reconquista of Calatayud by King Alfonso I el Batallador. This church was sited where the main mosque of the town was located.

The church assumed a historical position in that it hosted some of the meetings of the Cortes de Calatayud during the reign of King Pedro IV of Aragon, and where the town swore allegiance to Emperor Charles I and later to King Philip III of Spain. The church was declared Bien de Interés Cultural in 1884.

== Art and architecture ==
Of the original mudéjar-gothic construction, the church retains the cloister, tower and apse. In the 16th century the portal was sculpted in alabaster by Juan de Talavera and Esteban de Obray.

In 1884, the church was declared Monumento Nacional, and the main portal was surrounded by a gate.

In 2001, the UNESCO recognized it as a World Heritage, within the Mudéjar Architecture of Aragon Site.

== Torre de Santa María ==
The 70 meter brick tower of octagonal base, and like most such towers, the decoration increases as one rises. Construction took centuries. At the base, the walls are 1.5 meters in thickness. The stairwell spirals upward between an inner and outer wall. The spire atop the belltower was built in the mid- to late 18th century.

== See also ==
- List of Bien de Interés Cultural in the Province of Zaragoza
