= San Andreas =

San Andreas is an archaic variation of the Spanish language San Andrés (Saint Andrew, the apostle).

It may also refer to:

== Places ==
- San Andreas, California, an unincorporated town
- San Andreas Fault, a geologic fault that runs through California
- San Andreas Lake, a lake near San Francisco, California for which the fault is named

== Arts, entertainment, and media ==
- San Andreas (novel), a 1984 novel by Alistair MacLean
- San Andreas (film), a 2015 film directed by Brad Peyton
- San Andreas, a fictional location in several games in the Grand Theft Auto series
  - San Andreas, a city based on San Francisco in the first Grand Theft Auto
  - San Andreas, a state based on several parts of the Southwestern United States in Grand Theft Auto: San Andreas
  - San Andreas, a state based on California in Grand Theft Auto V

== See also ==
- San Andrés (disambiguation)
- St Andrews (disambiguation)
