= St Andrew's School (The Bahamas) =

St Andrew's International School

Location
- New Providence, Bahamas
- Coordinates: 25°01′42″N 77°16′55″W

Information
- Type: Private
- Established: 1948
- Principal: Gordon McKenzie
- Grades: Nursery to 13th Grade
- Houses: Arawak; Carib; Lucayan; Taino
- Colours: Navy and White
- Website: standrewsbahamas.com/

St Andrew's International School is an international IB primary and secondary school in Nassau, Bahamas. The school enrolls approximately 400 students from Preschool to Grade 12, of whom around 75% are Bahamian.

St Andrew's International School has high academic standards and holds internationally accredited status with both the Council of International Schools and the New England Association of Schools and Colleges.

St Andrew's was the first school in the Bahamas to be authorized to offer the International Baccalaureate Organization's Primary Years Programme (PYP) and the Pre-University IB Diploma curriculum.

== History ==
St Andrew's School first opened its doors in 1948 with an enrollment of 24 students. Its first headmaster was Reverend J. H. Poole, the Minister then in charge of St. Andrews Presbyterian Kirk. For the next two years, the students were accommodated in the Kirk Hall, and the name St Andrew's was permanently adopted.

The School was founded by a group of parents who wanted their children prepared for admission into private boarding schools in Britain by the age of 13. At the time, the subjects taught in local Primary School did not include those necessary for entry into private British schools. Candidates for entrance were required to sit examinations in Latin and/or Greek, French, Algebra, Geometry, History, and Geography, in addition to the usual papers in English, Arithmetic and Religious Knowledge.

By 1950, the number of students had increased to 70 and the Kirk Hall was no longer an adequate location for the school. In that same year, a group of enthusiastic and far-sighted parents negotiated the purchase of the Collins property that borders both Shirley Street and Collins Avenue. The school grew to 160 pupils by 1954.

As St Andrew's School enlarged, so did the number of parents who wished for their children to complete their secondary education either in North America or the United Kingdom. To meet these needs, it was necessary to widen the educational horizons of the School. Thus, in addition to offering the London University GCE 'O' Level courses and examinations, the School became a PSAT and SAT Examination Centre.

Over the next 15 years, the School's population grew to 590 students and it was evident that new premises had to be sought. The existing School property at Yamacraw was acquired and a major fund raising effort then ensued, championed by students, teachers, parents, and the energetic and devoted Headmaster, Mr. John Chaplin. In early 1970, the ground was broken and by November 1971, the school had moved to the campus it occupies today.

== Notable alumni ==
- Debbie Ferguson - Olympic Gold Medalist
- Jerome Fitzgerald - former Bahamian Education Minister
- Chas W. Freeman, Jr. - American (US) diplomat, government official
- David Morris - British politician
- Connor Sheehan - Bahamian international soccer player
