= St. Andrew's Hospital, Beijing =

Anglican founded hospital in Beijing, China

- Anglican Church of China

Geography
- Location: Beijing, China

History
- Opened: before 1949

Links
- Lists: Hospitals in China

St. Andrew's Hospital (Chinese: 河间圣安得烈医院) is located in Beijing, China. It was founded by the Anglican Church of China.
