= Calatayud =

- Municipality
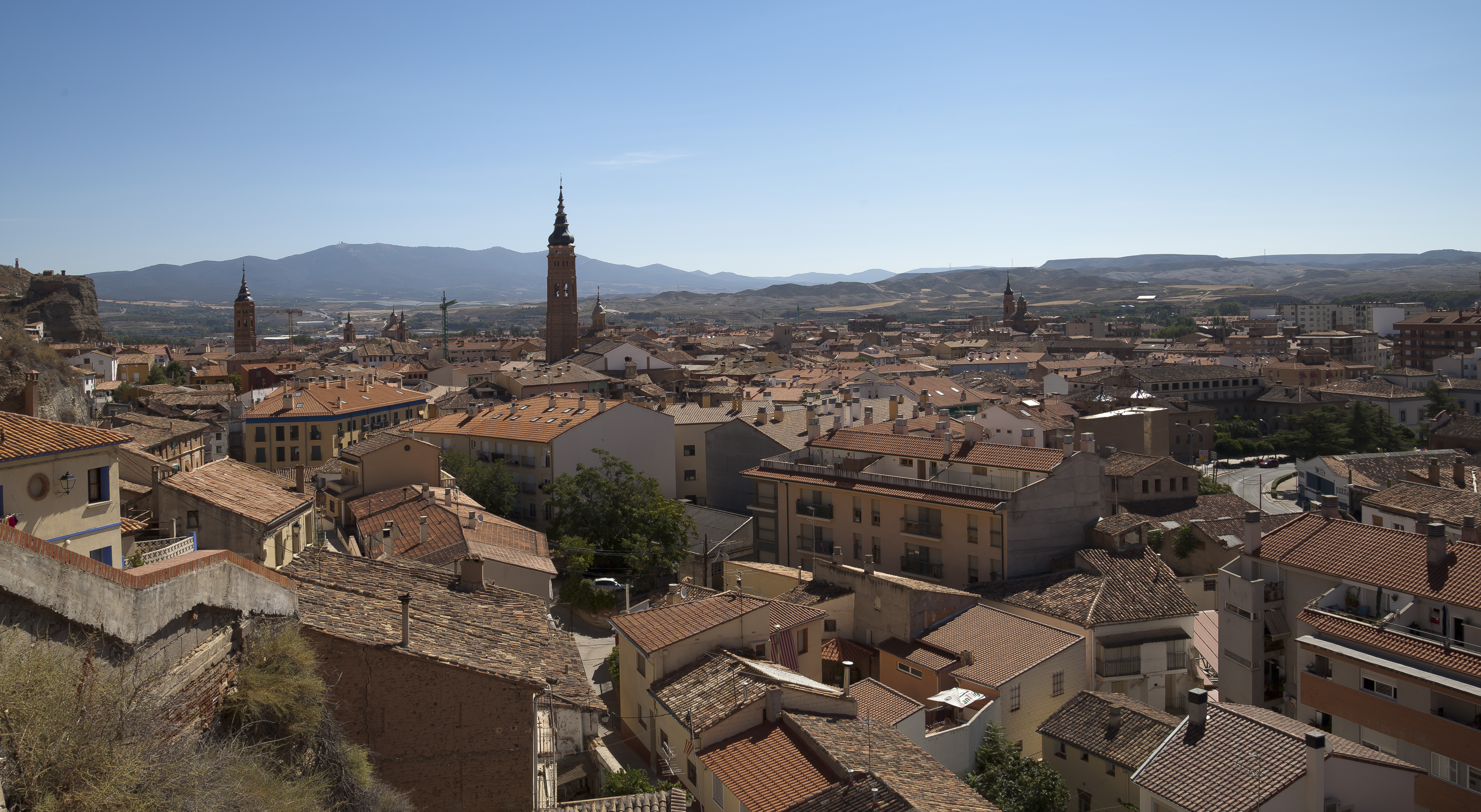

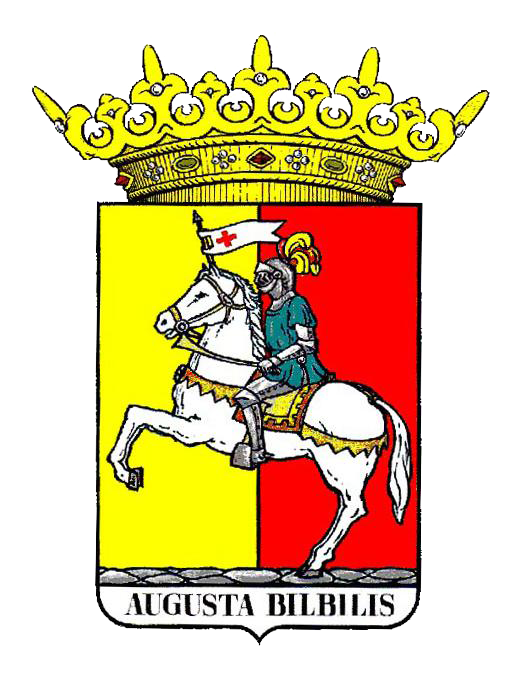
- Flag Coat of arms

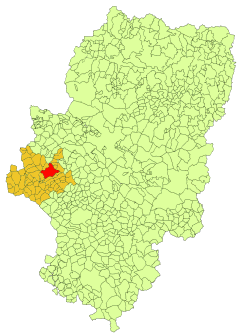
- Location in Aragon

- Location in Spain Calatayud (Spain)
- Coordinates: 41°21′0″N 1°38′0″W
- Country: Spain
- Autonomous community: Aragon
- Province: Zaragoza
- Comarca: Comunidad de Calatayud
- Judicial district: Calatayud

Government
  - Alcalde: José Manuel Aranda (PP)

Area
  - Total: 154 km^{2} (59 sq mi)
- Elevation: 536 m (1,759 ft)

Population (2025-01-01)
  - Total: 20,158
  - Density: 131/km^{2} (339/sq mi)
- Demonym(s): Bilbilitano, na
- Time zone: UTC+1 (CET)
  - Summer (DST): UTC+2 (CEST)
- Postal code: 50300
- Website: Official website

Calatayud (Spanish pronunciation: [kalataˈʝuð]; Aragonese: Calatayú; 2014 pop. 20,658) is a municipality in the Province of Zaragoza, within Aragón, Spain, lying on the river Jalón, in the midst of the Sistema Ibérico mountain range. It is the second-largest town in the province after the capital, Zaragoza, and the largest town in Aragón other than the three provincial capitals. It is the seat of the comarca of Calatayud. Its population has been declining during the last decade due to migration.

The town motto is Muy noble, leal, siempre augusta y fidelísima ciudad de Calatayud ("The very noble, loyal, always august and most faithful town of Calatayud"). The first democratic elections after Francisco Franco's regime were called for 15 June 1977. In Calatayud they were held one day earlier than all the rest of Spain, in order to prepare for a visit there by King Juan Carlos I.

== Highways and railways ==
The town is located by the Carretera Nacional N-II highway, the Autovía A-2 and the N-234, among other local roads.

The AVE Madrid–Barcelona high-speed rail line, as well as the Renfe line from Madrid to Barcelona, stop in Calatayud.

== History ==
The city was founded on the site of a Celt-Iberian settlement by the Romans with the name Augusta Bilbilis and was the birthplace of the poet Martial in 40 CE. The site of the ruins of Augusta Bilbilis are approximately four kilometers to the north of the modern city of Calatayud. The modern town was founded by the Moors around the Ayyub castle, circa 716 CE.

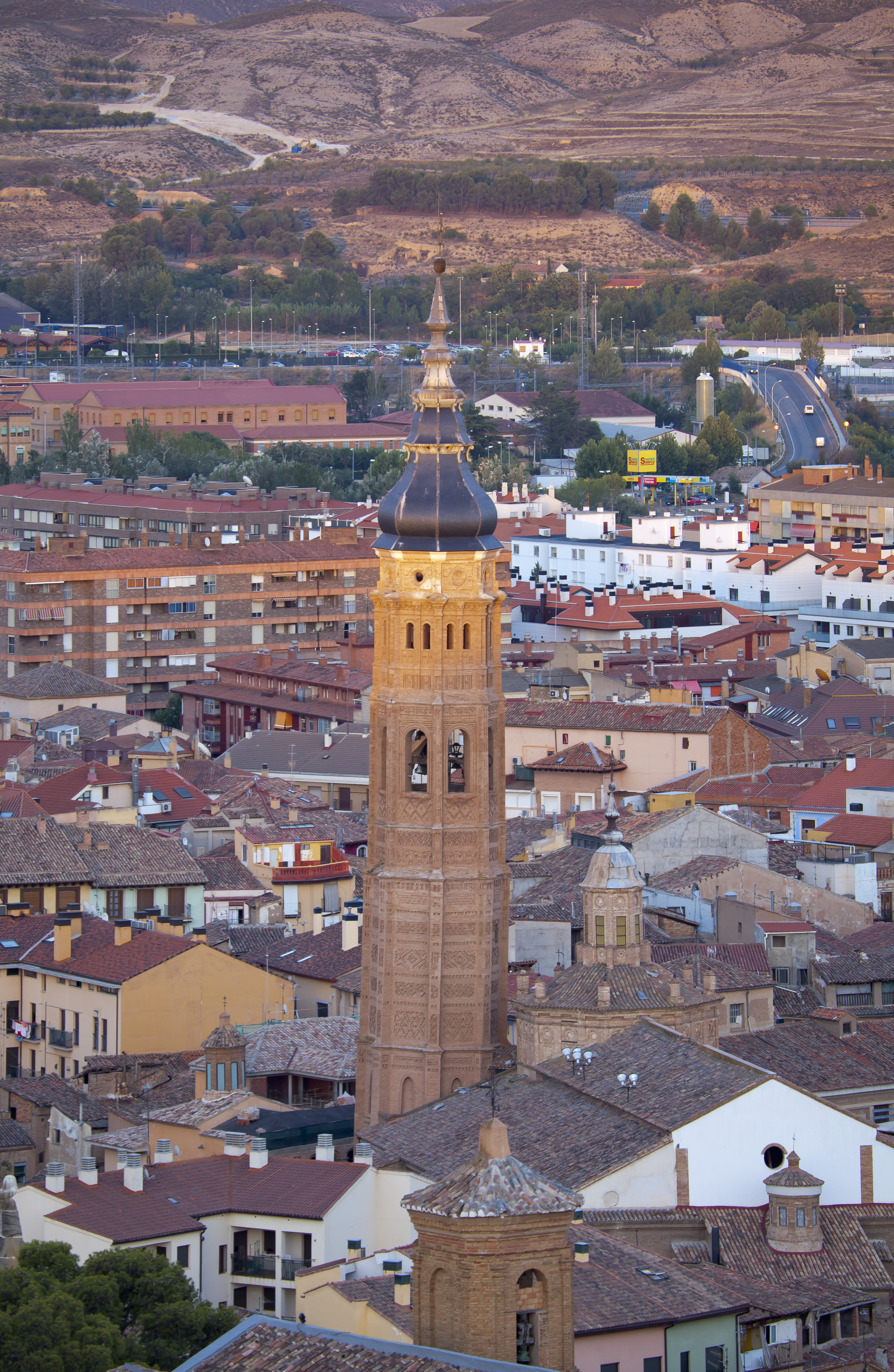
The mudéjar-gothic Colegiata de Santa Maria la Mayor

The name Calatayud came from the Arabic قلعة أيوب Qal‘at ’Ayyūb, "the qal'a [fortress] of Ayyub". The ancient inhabitants of Bilbilis moved to the new site. Occupying a strategic placement between the central meseta of Spain and the Ebro valley, the city retained its importance in succeeding centuries. By the eleventh century a substantial Jewish community was present, surviving the Reconquista until the expulsion of the Jews of Spain in 1492. Judaica texts from this era refer to Calatayud as קלע איוב, קלעה איוב, or קלעיה איוב (Qalʿah Ayuv, Qalʿ Ayuv, Qalʿiya Ayuv). The city was conquered back from the Muslims by Alfonso I of Aragón in 1119. Many surviving examples of mudéjar church architecture show that the Islamic influence lives on.

During the Peninsular Wars a notable siege of French-occupied Calatayud led to its capture by guerillas in 1811. The city was the capital of its own province in 1822–23, during the Trienio Liberal.

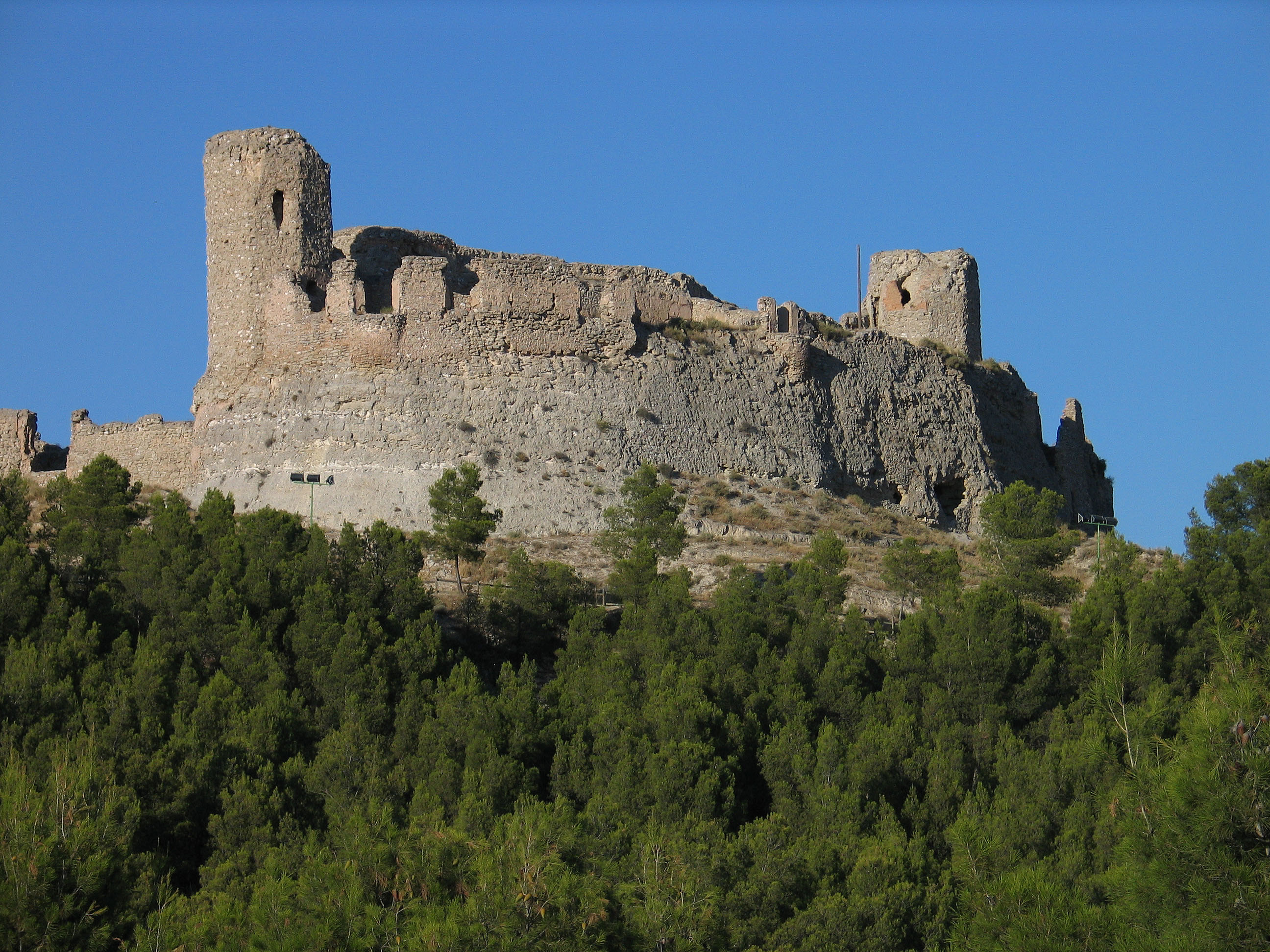
The Castle of Calatayud

The town suffers from sinkholes.

== Main sights ==
- One of the most notable Mudéjar towers of Aragón is the 15th-century bell tower of the collegiate church of Santa María, which was built on the site of a mosque. A Renaissance doorway was added in 1528.
- Santo Sepulcro, built in 1141, and restored in 1613, was long the principal church of the Spanish Knights Templar.
- This qalʿat is the biggest and oldest one on the Iberian peninsula.
- The church of "San Pedro" was founded by Ferdinand II of Aragón and it was there that the first cortes (parliament) of Aragon was held in 1411.

== Economy ==
The majority of employment is in the service sector and in agriculture. Agriculture consists primarily of apple and pear orchards, although there are also some vineyards in the area). Industry is much less developed, although there are two industrial estates (La Charluca and Mediavega) and the creation of a third is being studied.

== Quarters and villages ==
- Quarters: Huérmeda, Torres and Embid de la Ribera
- Villages: Campiel, Carramolina, Marivella, Ribota, San Ramón and Terrer

== Fiestas ==
- Easter
- Pilgrimage (romeria) in honour of el Cristo de Ribota, May 1
- Saint Íñigo's Day, June 1
- Saint Roch's Day, August 14–16
- Virgen de la Peña, September 8–12

== Climate ==
Calatayud has a cold semi-arid climate (Köppen climate classification: BSk) with cool to mild winters and hot summers. Precipitation is irregular throughout the year, with spring being the wettest season and winter the driest, although August is the driest month. These precipitation patterns are typical of the semi-arid regions of Aragon. Due to its higher altitude compared to the Ebro Valley, the average annual temperature is lower, with colder winters and more pleasant summers.

Climate data for Calatayud (1993–2020), extremes (1993-present)
Month	Jan	Feb	Mar	Apr	May	Jun	Jul	Aug	Sep	Oct	Nov	Dec	Year
Record high °C (°F)	20.6 (69.1)	24.7 (76.5)	29.0 (84.2)	34.0 (93.2)	37.5 (99.5)	43.0 (109.4)	41.6 (106.9)	42.0 (107.6)	39.5 (103.1)	34.5 (94.1)	24.6 (76.3)	21.6 (70.9)	43.0 (109.4)
Mean daily maximum °C (°F)	11.0 (51.8)	13.4 (56.1)	16.6 (61.9)	18.9 (66.0)	23.0 (73.4)	28.6 (83.5)	31.9 (89.4)	31.1 (88.0)	26.6 (79.9)	21.4 (70.5)	14.6 (58.3)	10.9 (51.6)	20.7 (69.2)
Daily mean °C (°F)	5.9 (42.6)	7.4 (45.3)	10.0 (50.0)	12.4 (54.3)	16.3 (61.3)	21.2 (70.2)	24.2 (75.6)	23.4 (74.1)	19.3 (66.7)	14.9 (58.8)	9.5 (49.1)	6.1 (43.0)	14.2 (57.6)
Mean daily minimum °C (°F)	0.9 (33.6)	1.4 (34.5)	3.4 (38.1)	5.9 (42.6)	9.6 (49.3)	13.8 (56.8)	16.4 (61.5)	15.6 (60.1)	11.9 (53.4)	8.3 (46.9)	4.3 (39.7)	1.2 (34.2)	7.7 (45.9)
Record low °C (°F)	−15.4 (4.3)	−9.1 (15.6)	−9.8 (14.4)	−4.9 (23.2)	−1.7 (28.9)	4.8 (40.6)	7.0 (44.6)	6.9 (44.4)	1.4 (34.5)	−1.3 (29.7)	−8.2 (17.2)	−14.7 (5.5)	−15.4 (4.3)
Average precipitation mm (inches)	17.9 (0.70)	18.7 (0.74)	24.5 (0.96)	44.3 (1.74)	49.3 (1.94)	33.4 (1.31)	21.0 (0.83)	14.6 (0.57)	23.8 (0.94)	34.0 (1.34)	33.5 (1.32)	18.3 (0.72)	333.3 (13.11)
Source: Agencia Estatal de Meteorologia

== Traditions ==
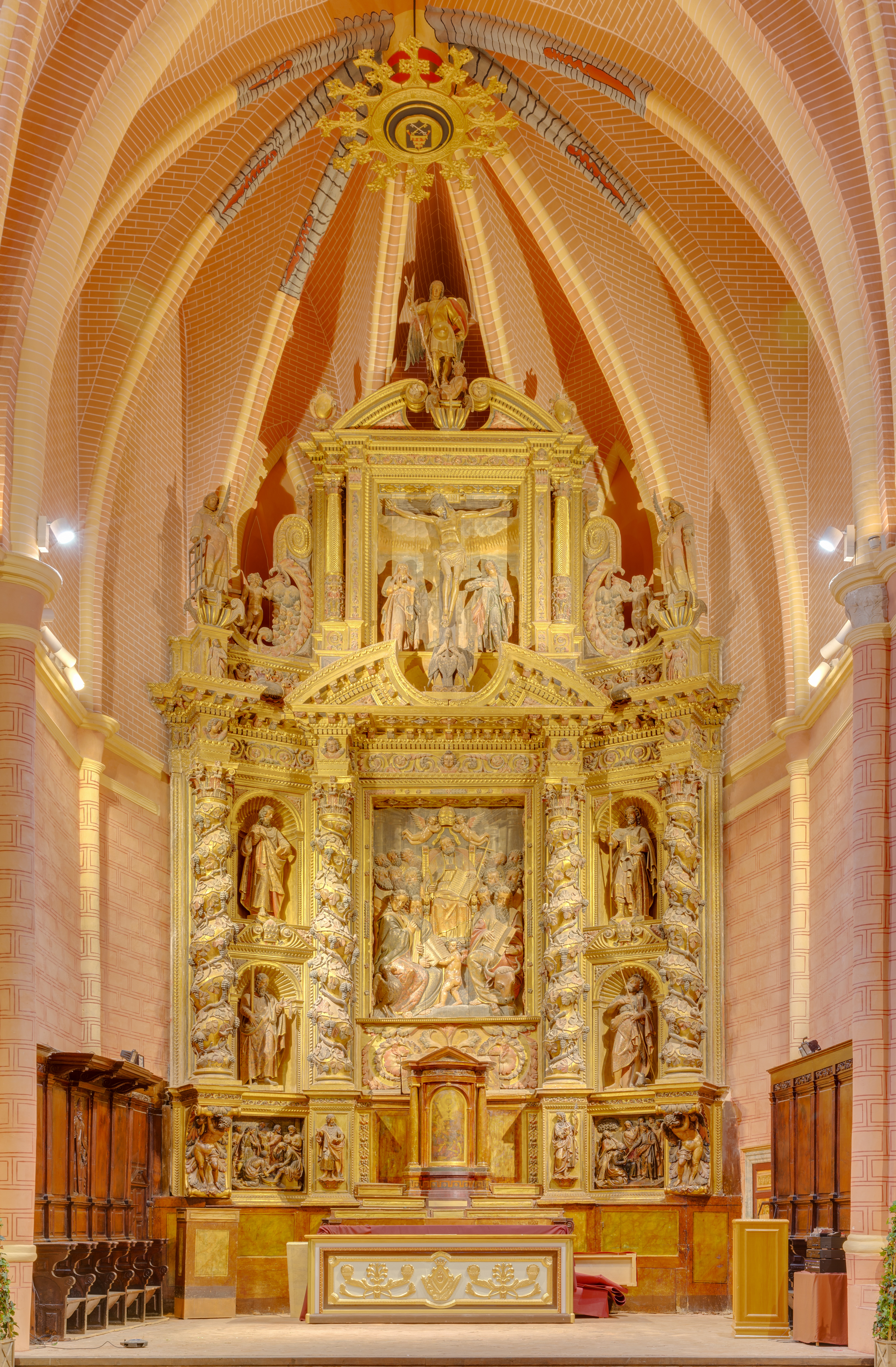
Church of San Pedro de los Francos, Calatayud.

There is a popular Spanish song that says (translated) "If you go to Calatayud / ask for Dolores (a popular female name) / she is a very nice girl / fond of granting favours" that captures the (traditional) fame of girls in Calatayud. Given that reputation, traditionally boys went to the town in order to "ask for Dolores" to be "favoured" by local girls. Nowadays this tradition has dismissed although in festivities, boys from the surroundings, even from Zaragoza, visit the town with that aim.

== Sister cities ==
Calatayud has four sister cities:

- Dueville, Veneto Italy
- Gáldar, Gran Canaria Spain
- Glen Ellyn, Illinois United States
- Auch, Gascony France

== See also ==
- List of municipalities in Zaragoza
- Calatayud (DO)
- Mudéjar
- Comunidad de Calatayud
- Glen Ellyn (sister city)
- Santuario de la Virgen de la Peña, Calatayud
