= List of saints named Andrew =

Saint Andrew commonly refers to Andrew the Apostle, the Christian apostle and brother of Saint Peter.

It may also refer to:

- Andrew Stratelates, d. 300
- Andrew Corsini (San Andrea Corsini), d. 1373
- Andrew of Constantinople, Orthodox Fool for Christ
- Andrew of Crete (c. 650 – c. 730), 8th century bishop, theologian, homilist and hymnographer
- Andrew of Crete (martyr), a martyr
- Andrew of Lampsacus, d. 250 AD, martyred with Paul, Denise, and Peter
- Andrew Dũng-Lạc, Vietnamese martyr
  - also Andrew Thong Kim Nguyen, Andrew Trong Van Tram, and Andrew Tuong of the Vietnamese Martyrs
- Andrew Kim Taegon of the Korean Martyrs
- Andrew Kaggwa of the Ugandan Martyrs
- Andrew the Scot
- Andrew Avellino
- Andrew Bobola, Polish jesuit, missionary and martyr
