= San Andrés Municipality, Beni =

Coordinates: 15°20′S 64°20′W

San Andrés Municipality
- Municipality
- Flag
- Interactive map of San Andrés Municipality
- Country: Bolivia
- Department: Beni Department
- Province: Marbán
- Time zone: UTC-4 (BOT)

San Andrés Municipality is a municipality of the Beni Department, Bolivia.
