= St. Martin's Church =

St. Martin's Church or St. Martin of Tours Church may refer to any one of a number of churches. These are mostly dedicated to Martin of Tours. They include:

== Belgium ==
- St Martin's Church, Aalst
- St Martin's Church, Arlon
- Saint Martin's Church (Ghent); see Georges-Jacques Aelsters
- Saint Martin's Church (Kortrijk)
- Saint Martin's Church (Ypres), formerly a cathedral

== Croatia ==
- St Martin's Church (Split)

== Denmark ==
- St. Martin's Church (Næstved)

== Estonia ==
- Käina church (Saint Martin's Church of Käina), a church in Estonia
- Valjala church (Saint Martin's Church of Valjala)

== France ==
=== Alsace ===
- Saint-Martin Church, Colmar
- Église Saint-Martin d'Erstein
- Église Saint-Martin, Marmoutier

=== Auvergne ===
- St Martin's Church, Chavenon, in the Allier département
- Église Saint-Martin, in Montluçon in the Allier département

=== Bourgogne ===
- Église Saint-Martin, in Murlin

=== Bretagne ===
- Saint-Martin Church (Brest), Brest

=== Centre ===
- Église Saint-Martin d'Amilly, Amilly, Loiret
- Église Saint-Martin de Beaune-la-Rolande, Beaune-la-Rolande
- Église Saint-Martin (Mardié), Mardié
- Église Saint-Martin (Olivet), Olivet, Loiret

=== Hauts-de-France ===
- Église Saint-Martin de Cousolre, in the Nord département

=== Midi-Pyrénées ===
- Église Saint-Martin d'Arèch, Castelnau-d'Auzan

=== Nouvelle-Aquitaine ===
- Église Saint-Martin in Nedde, in the Haute-Vienne département
- Église Saint-Martin in Oradour-sur-Glane, in the Haute-Vienne département

=== La Réunion ===
- Église Saint-Martin de Grand Îlet, Salazie

== Germany ==
- St. Martin's Chapel, Furtwangen, Baden-Württemberg
- St. Martin, Sindelfingen, Baden-Württemberg
- St. Martin's Parish Church, Bamberg, Bavaria
- St. Martin's Church, Landshut, Bavaria
- St. Martin, Moosach, Munich, Bavaria
- St Martin's Church, a demolished church on Frauenchiemsee island, Rosenheim, Bavaria
- St. Martinus, Hattersheim, Hesse
- St. Martin, Idstein, Hesse
- St Martin's Church, Kassel, Hesse
- Great St. Martin Church, Cologne, North Rhine-Westphalia
- St. Martin's Church, Netphen, North Rhine-Westphalia
- Mainz Cathedral, Rhineland-Palatinate

== Italy ==
- St Martin's Church, Torgnon

== Latvia ==
- St. Martin's Church, Riga

== Malta ==
- St Martin's Chapel, Baħrija

== The Netherlands ==
- St. Martin's Cathedral, Utrecht in Utrecht
- Martinikerk (disambiguation)

== Portugal ==
- Igreja de São Martinho (Argoncilhe), Santa Maria da Feira
- Igreja de São Martinho (Padroso), Montalegre
- Igreja de São Martinho, Funchal, Madeira
- Igreja Matriz de São Martinho de Candoso, Guimarães
- Igreja de São Martinho de Cedofeita, Porto
- Igreja de São Martinho de Lordelo, Porto
- Igreja de São Martinho de Mouros, Resende
- Church of São Martinho (Alvaredo), Melgaço

== Slovakia ==
- St. Martin's Cathedral, Bratislava

== Spain ==
- Church of St Martin, Callosa de Segura in Callosa de Segura, Alicante
- Church of San Martín (Entrena)
- St Martin's Church, Puig-reig, Barcelona, Catalonia
- Basilica of San Martin de Mondoñedo, Foz, Galicia
- Church of St Martin of Tours (San Martín del Rey Aurelio)

== Switzerland ==
- Saint Martin's Church (Olten), in the Canton of Solothurn
- St. Martin's Church, Zillis, in the Canton of Grisons

== United Kingdom ==
- St Martin's Church, Allerton Mauleverer, North Yorkshire
- St Martin's Church, Ashton upon Mersey, Greater Manchester
- St Martin in the Bull Ring, Birmingham
- St Martin's Church, Bladon, Oxfordshire
- St Martin's Church, Brampton, Cumbria
- St Martin's Church, Brighton
- St Martin's Church, Canterbury
- St Martin's Church, Chipping Ongar, Essex
- St Martin's Chapel, Chisbury, Wiltshire
- St Martin's Church, Colchester, Essex
- St Martin's Church, Gospel Oak, London
- St Martin's Church, Great Mongeham, Great Mongeham, Kent
- Church of St Martin, Cwmyoy, Monmouthshire
- St Martin le Grand, York, North Yorkshire
- St Martin of Tours Church, Detling, Kent
- St Martin's Church, Dorking, Surrey
- St Martin's Church, East Horsley, East Horsley, Surrey
- St Michael and St Martin's Church, Eastleach Martin, Gloucestershire
- St Martin's Church, Eglwysbach, Conwy, Wales
- St Martin of Tours church, Epsom, Surrey
- St Martin's Church, Fenny Stratford, Buckinghamshire
- St Martin's Church, Knebworth
- Cathedral Church of St Martin, Leicester
- St Martin, Ludgate, London
- St Martin-in-the-Fields, London
- St Martin Vintry, London (former church)
- St Martin Pomary, London (former church)
- St Martin's Church, Martinhoe, Cornwall
- St Martin's Church, Oxford
- St Martin's Church, Preston Gubbals, Shropshire
- St Martin's Church, Ruislip, Greater London
- St Martin's Church, Sandford St Martin, Oxfordshire
- St Martin of Tours' Church, Saundby, Nottinghamshire
- St Martin-on-the-Hill, Scarborough, North Yorkshire
- St Martin's Church, Seamer, Hambleton, North Yorkshire
- St Martin's Church, Seamer, Scarborough, North Yorkshire
- St Martin's Church, Stamford, Lincolnshire
- St Martin's Church, Waithe, Lincolnshire
- St Martin's Church, Wareham, Dorset
- St Martin of Tours' Church, West Coker, Somerset
- St Martin's Church, Whenby, North Yorkshire
- St Martin-cum-Gregory's Church, Micklegate, York, North Yorkshire

== United States ==
- St. Martin of Tours Catholic Church, Los Angeles, California
- St. Martin of Tours Catholic Church (Louisville, Kentucky)
- St. Martin's Episcopal Church (Showell, Maryland)
- St. Martin of Tours Catholic Church (Gaithersburg, Maryland), a parish in the Roman Catholic Archdiocese of Washington
- St. Martin of Tours Catholic Church (St. Martinville, Louisiana)
- St. Martin's Church (Starkenburg), Starkenburg, Missouri
- St. Martin of Tours' Church (Bronx, New York)
- St. Martin's Catholic Church, Deweese, Nebraska
- St. Martin's Catholic Church, Valley City, Ohio
- St. Martin's Catholic Church (Round Top, Texas)
- St. Martin of Tours Episcopal Church, Omaha, Nebraska
- St. Martin's Church (Marcus Hook, Pennsylvania)
- Saint Martin of Tours Parish Roman Catholic Church, Oxford Circle, Philadelphia, Pennsylvania
- Saint Martin's Church, Providence, Rhode Island
- St. Martin's Catholic Church and Grotto, Oelrichs, South Dakota
- St. Martin's Episcopal Church (Houston), Texas
- St. Martin's Catholic Church, Tours, Texas

== See also ==
- St. Martin's (disambiguation)
