= St. Martin's Chapel =

St. Martin's Chapel may refer to:

- St. Martin's Chapel, Furtwangen, Germany
- St Martin's Chapel, Baħrija, Malta
- St Martin's Chapel, Chisbury, United Kingdom

== See also ==
- St. Martin's Church (disambiguation)
