= Grissenbach (Sieg) =

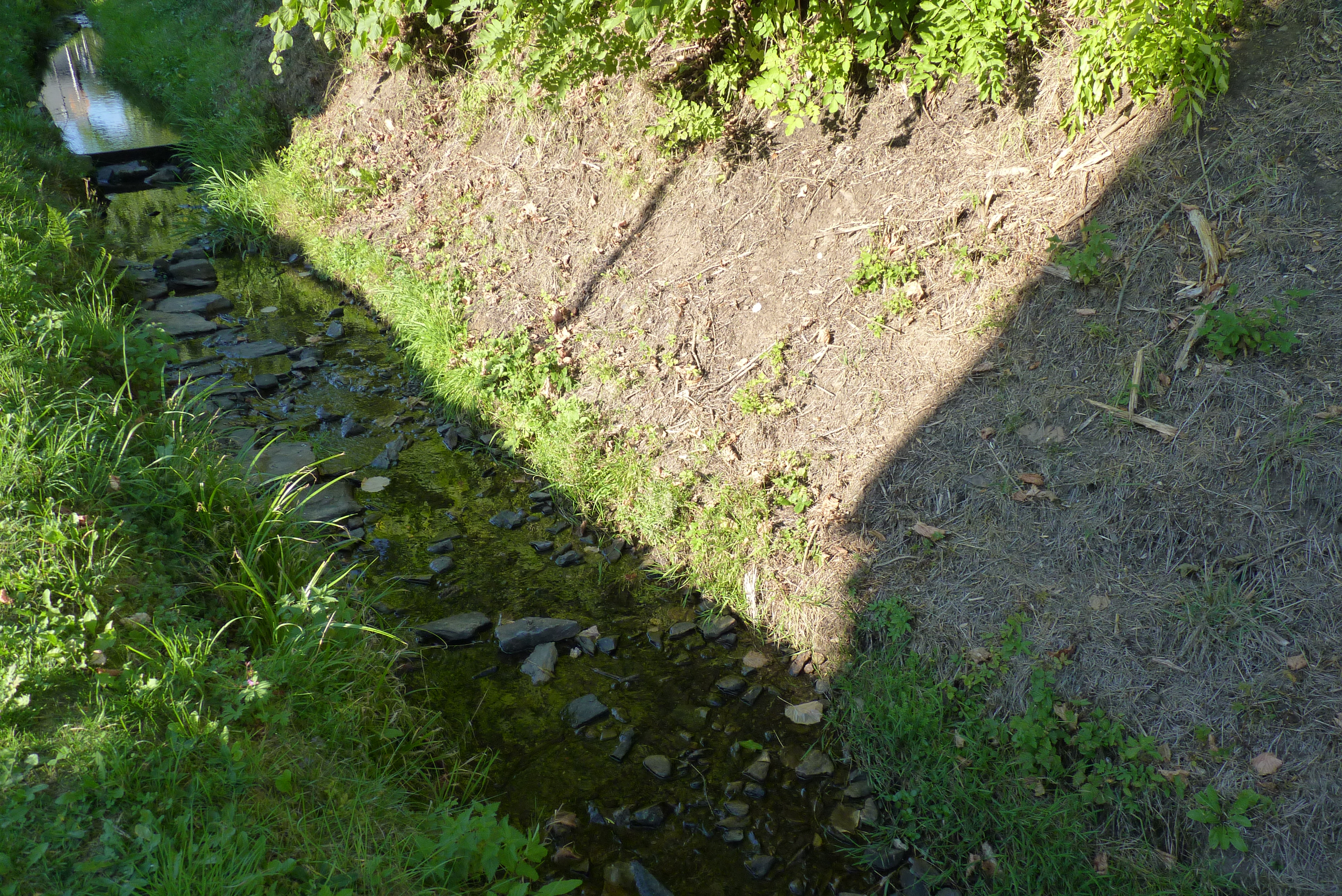

Location
- Country: Germany
- State: North Rhine-Westphalia

Physical characteristics
- Source
  - location: in the scherenschleifersborn, Rothaar Mountains
  - elevation: 467 m (1,532 ft)
- Mouth
  - location: in the village grissenbach in the Sieg.
  - coordinates: 50.8851°N 8.1680°E
  - elevation: 333 m (1,093 ft)
- Length: 2.67 km (1.66 mi)
- Basin size: 2.2 km^{2} (0.85 sq mi)

Basin features
- Progression: Sieg→ Rhine→ North Sea
- Tributaries
  - left: Hirschbach
  - right: Kälberseifenbach, Buderbach

Grissenbach is a river of North Rhine-Westphalia, Germany, which is 2.671 kilometres (1.660 mi) in length. It has its source in the Scherenschleifersborn with an elevation of 467 metres (1,532 ft), and it flows into the river Sieg in the village of Grissenbach with an elevation of 333 metres (1,093 ft) above sea level.

== See also ==
- List of rivers of North Rhine-Westphalia
