= Obernau (disambiguation) =

Obernau is a municipality in the district of Altenkirchen, Rhineland-Palatinate, Germany.

Obernau may also refer to:

- Obernau (Rottenburg), a suburb of Rottenburg am Neckar in the district of Tübingen in Baden-Württemberg, Germany
- Obernau (Sieg), a river of North Rhine-Westphalia, Germany
- a district of Kriens, canton of Lucerne, Switzerland
- a district of Aschaffenburg, Bavaria, Germany
- a district of Kitzbühel, Tyrol, Austria
