= Buxierophus =

Scientific classification
- Kingdom: Animalia
- Phylum: Chordata
- Clade: Tetrapoda
- Order: †Temnospondyli
- Family: †Dissorophidae
- Genus: †Buxierophus; Werneburg, Logghe, & Steyer, 2025

Species
- Buxierophus pouilloni Werneburg, Logghe, & Steyer, 2025

Extinct genus of amphibians

Buxierophus is a genus of dissorophid temnospondyl from the early Permian of France. It is the only dissorophid from the early Permian of Europe and represents a possibly semi-aquatic member of the group, which is otherwise thought to be highly terrestrial, based on the skeletal anatomy. It is named after the type locality, Buxières-les-Mines, and -orophe, Greek for 'roof' in reference to the osteoderms.

== Discovery and description ==
Buxierophus is known from the type species, Buxierophus pouilloni, which is named after French geologist Jean-Marc Pouillon. The species is known only from the holotype (RH-D 20–03–99), a partial skull and articulated anterior postcranium. It was named by German paleontologist Ralf Werneburg and French paleontologists Antoine Logghe and Jean-Sébastien Steyer. The holotype was found at the Buxières-les-Mines locality in the Bourbon-l'Archambault Basin in Allier; this locality is an open coal mine that has produced extensive faunal and floral remains, including algae, stromatolites, palynomorphs, blattoid insects, elasmobranch sharks, acanthodians, palaeoniscoid actinopterygians, and other temnospondyl amphibians ('archegosaurid' stereospondylomorphs, branchiosaurids, and eryopids).

Buxierophus pouilloni is diagnosed by a combination of postcranial features: dorsal midline series of osteoderms composed of two series of thin and unornamented osteoderms, some bearing conspicuous peaks dorsally; internal osteoderms with bi- or multi-lobed dorsal articulation surfaces; neural arches of the same length to that of the osteoderm. The skull is more generic with many common features of dissorophids, being slightly longer than wide, with large, laterally facing orbits. Well-eveloped ridges are found in several parts of the skull. The interpterygoid vacuities are large on the palate, which is covered by a shagreen of denticles.

== Paleobiology ==
Like other olsoniform dissorophoids, Buxierophus lacks lateral line grooves on the skull or postcranial elements and has a relatively well-ossified postcranial skeleton in addition to the osteoderms typical of dissorophids. However, the holotype includes a fully ossified ceratobranchial skeleton with grooved ceratobranchials that are interpreted as evidence for fish-like internal gills, which suggests a semi-aquatic lifestyle for this taxon and aligns with the paleo-lake environment of Buxières-les-Mines.
