= Watermill of Veaux =

Watermill in Chavenon, France

Coordinates: 46°25′22″N 2°58′8″E

"Moulin des Veaux" is a French watermill in Chavenon in the Allier department in the Auvergne Region

== History ==
Watermill of Veaux on the river Aumance (the last one on this French river). The Aumance is a tributary of the Cher. This mill is on the Cassini map. It belonged to Château de Laly ( Le Montet) and Château de Saint-Hubert (Chavenon).
