= St. Martin's Cathedral =

St. Martin's Cathedral may refer to

- St Martin's Cathedral, Bratislava, Slovakia
- St Martin's Cathedral (Spišská Kapitula), Slovakia
- Lucca Cathedral in Lucca, La cattedrale di San Martino
- Mainz Cathedral in Mainz
- St. Martin's Cathedral, Utrecht
- St Martin's Cathedral, Ypres, technically no longer a cathedral
- St. Martin's Cathedral (Gander), Newfoundland

== See also ==
- St. Martin and St. Nicholas Cathedral, Bydgoszcz, Poland
- St. Martin's Church (disambiguation)
