= Longinus cross =

Form of the Arma Christi cross

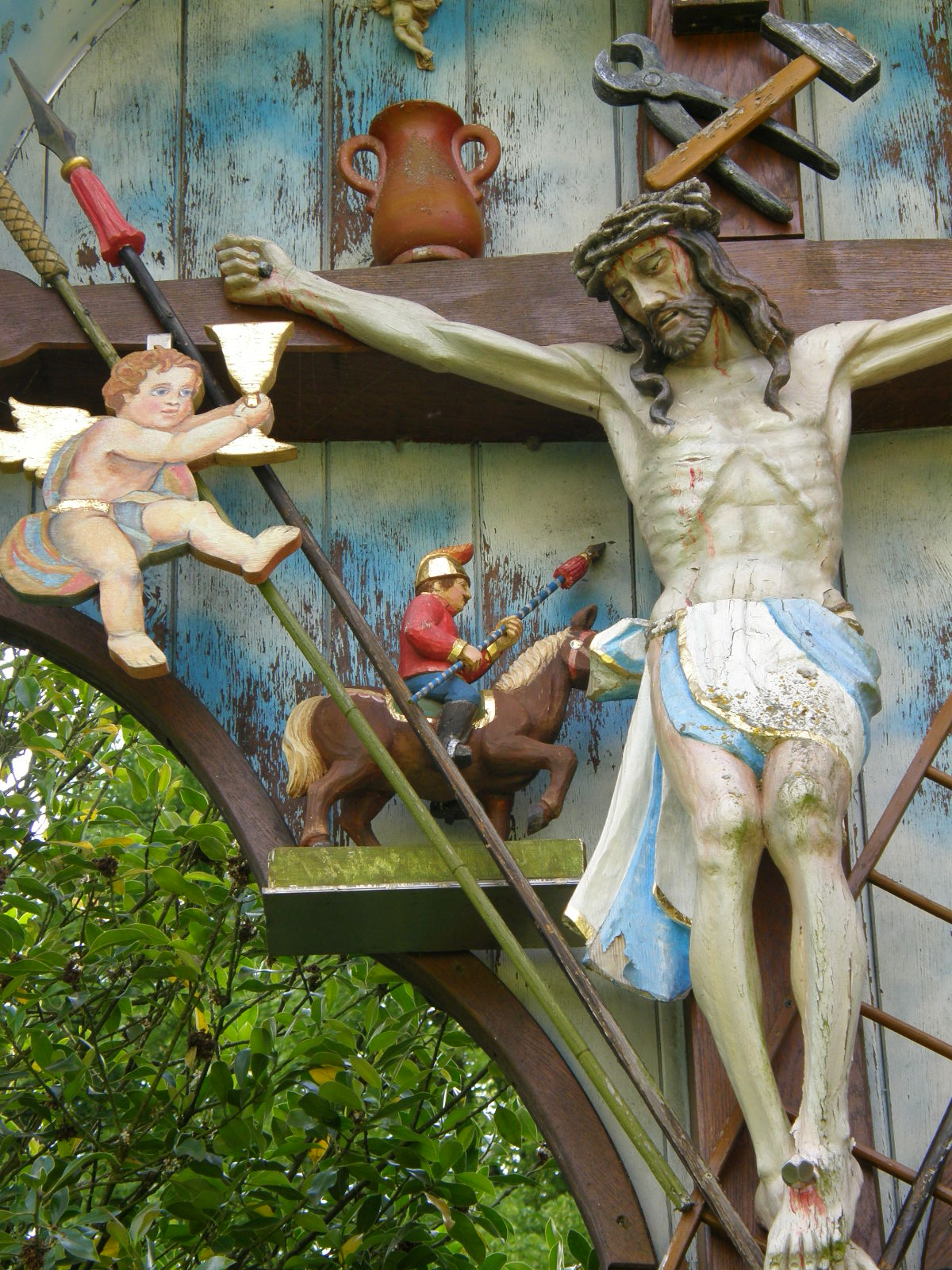
Detail of a Longinus cross

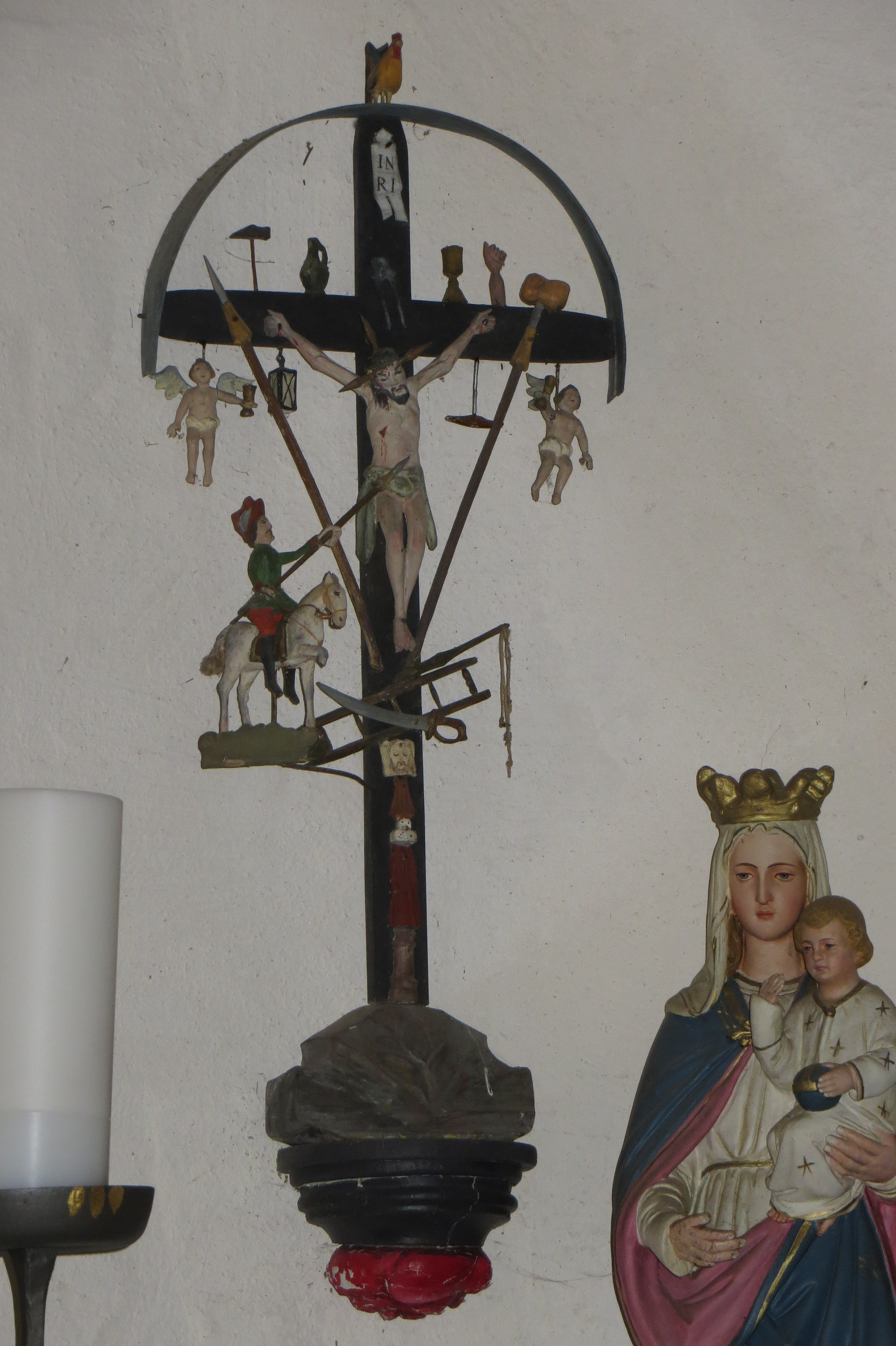
A Longinus Cross in St. Martin's Chapel, Furtwangen, Germany

The Longinus cross (German: Longinuskreuz) is a special form of the Arma Christi cross, which occurs mainly in the Black Forest, but also occasionally in other regions of South Germany. In addition to the instruments of the Passion, Longinus crosses depict the figure of Saint Longinus as a horseman to the side of the crucified Jesus. These crosses are usually made of wood and are about 3–4 metres high. Often they are topped by a hipped roof that resembles the roofs of Black Forest houses, and a back wall on which the figures bearing the instruments are depicted.

The history of Longinus crosses is closely bound up with the monastic orders that provided spiritual care in the Black Forest: the Jesuits, Capuchins and Cistercians. The popular missionaries of these religious communities erected mission crosses, on which the instruments associated with the suffering of Christ were displayed. The links between the Anterior Austrian parts of the Black Forest and the imperial capital of Vienna, where the Holy Lance was kept, could have played a role here. The design of these mission crosses was subsequently copied by private wayside and household crosses.

The feature of the Longinus crosses, the depiction of the figure of Saint Longinus as a rider beneath the cross, is probably explained by the popularity of the saint as a patron of farmers. On older crosses, his figure is usually shown in the uniform of a Baden dragoon, often accompanied by the verse "Truly, this was the Son of God" (from Mark 15:39) on his shield. Many Black Foresters served as cavalry in the wars of the 19th century, due to their familiarity with horses and, on their return from war, made Longinus crosses in memory of their own military service.

Little is generally known about the woodcarvers who made the crosses. Stylistically, however, several individual artists can be distinguished and, in some cases, even their names are known. Of great artistic quality are crosses by the so-called "Herrgott Mattheubis", who came from the area of Schonach. Often the figures of Christ were ordered from professional sculptors, whilst the instruments were carved by members of the rural population themselves.

Even today Longinus crosses are occasionally made. The older crosses are protected as Kleindenkmale ("little monuments").

== Literature ==
- Friedbert Andernach und Martin Ruch: Arma Christi- und Longinuskreuze im Erzbistum Freiburg. Blauer Reiter unterm Kreuz. Editions du Signe, Strasbourg, 2001, ISBN 2-7468-0423-9, 50 Seiten
- Rezension' by Hermann Althaus, Review of Andernach and Ruch, 2003.
