= Martinikerk =

Martinikerk may refer to one of several churches in the Netherlands:

- Martinikerk (Bolsward)
- Martinikerk (Doesburg)
- Martinikerk (Easterein), Easterein
- Martinikerk (Franeker), Franeker
- Martinikerk (Groningen)
- Martinikerk (Sneek), Sneek

== Other uses ==
- Martinikerk Rondeau, a documentary

== See also ==
- St. Martin's Cathedral, Utrecht
- St. Martin's Church (disambiguation)
