= Château de Laly =

Château in Auvergne-Rhône-Alpes, France

Coordinates: 46°24′34″N 3°2′58″E

The Château de Laly is a château or manor house in Le Montet in the Allier department in the Auvergne Region of France.

== History ==
The present building is of the 17th century. Its former owners included the Gaulmyn family, who were lawyers to the Bourbons, and later the Camus family.

The château used to own a chapel and a hunting lodge in Chavenon; this is now known as the Château de Saint-Hubert, and is in use as a Russian Orthodox monastery.
