= Chavenon station =

Railway station in Chavenon, France

Chavenon
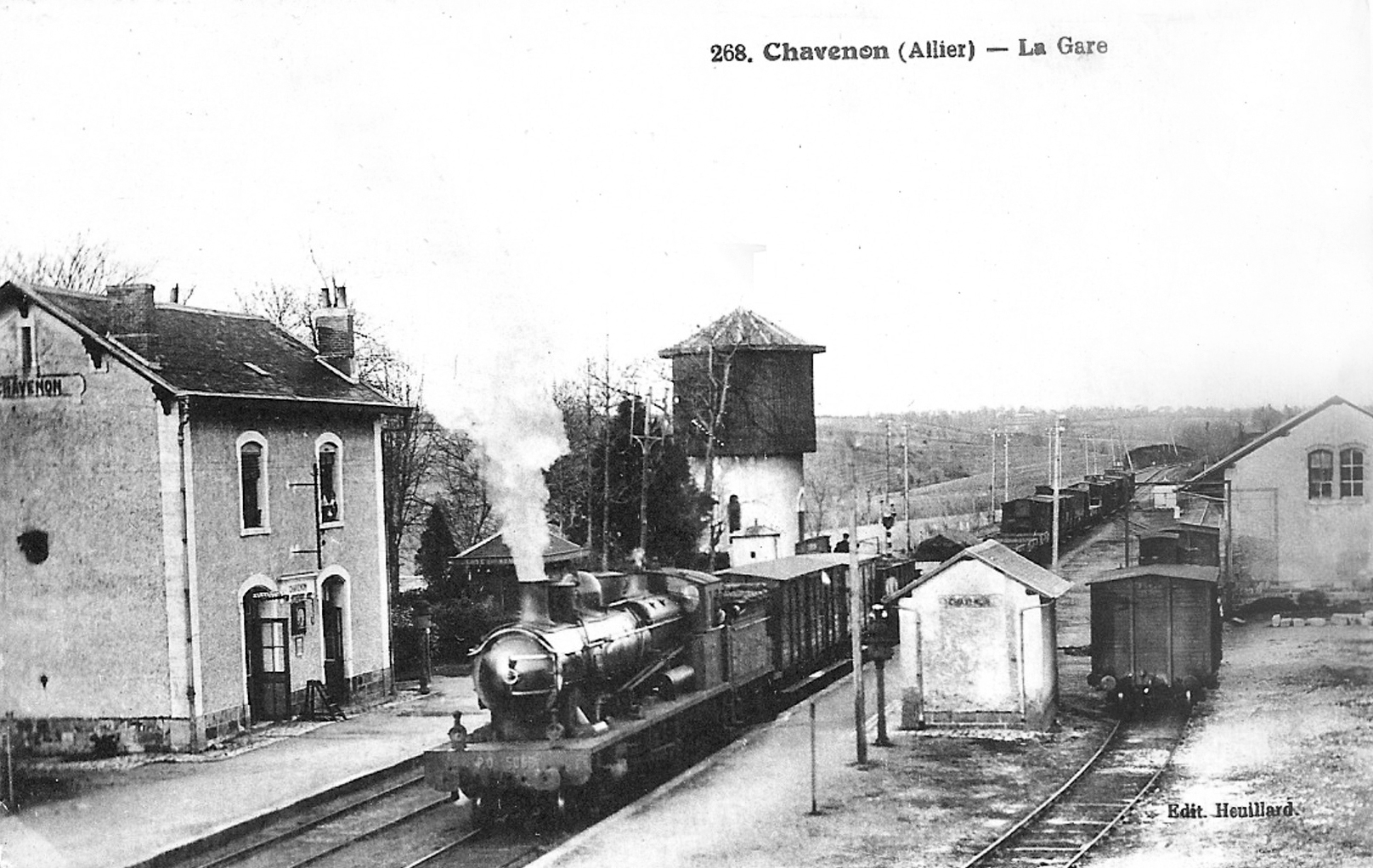

General information
- Location: Chavenon, Allier, Auvergne; France
- Coordinates: 46°24′57″N 2°56′28″E

Other information
- Station code: 87641530

History
- Opened: 1859
- Closed: 1972
Location

Chavenon station (French: Gare de Chavenon) was a railway station in Chavenon, France. It was opened in 1859 by the Paris to Orléans Railway Company (P.O.). The French National Railway Company (SNCF) closed the passenger service in 1972 and the freight service in 1999.

== Destinations ==
The following connections were offered:

- To Montluçon
- To Moulins

The station was also used for the transportation of coal produced in the nearby city of Buxières-les-Mines.

== Sources ==
- Palau, François; Palau, Maguy (May 2001). "4.13 Montluçon-Moulins". In Palau (ed.). Le rail en France. Le second Empire: 1858-1863 (in French). Vol. 2. Paris. pp. 87–88. ISBN 978-2-9509421-2-8.
