= Chavenon =

- Commune
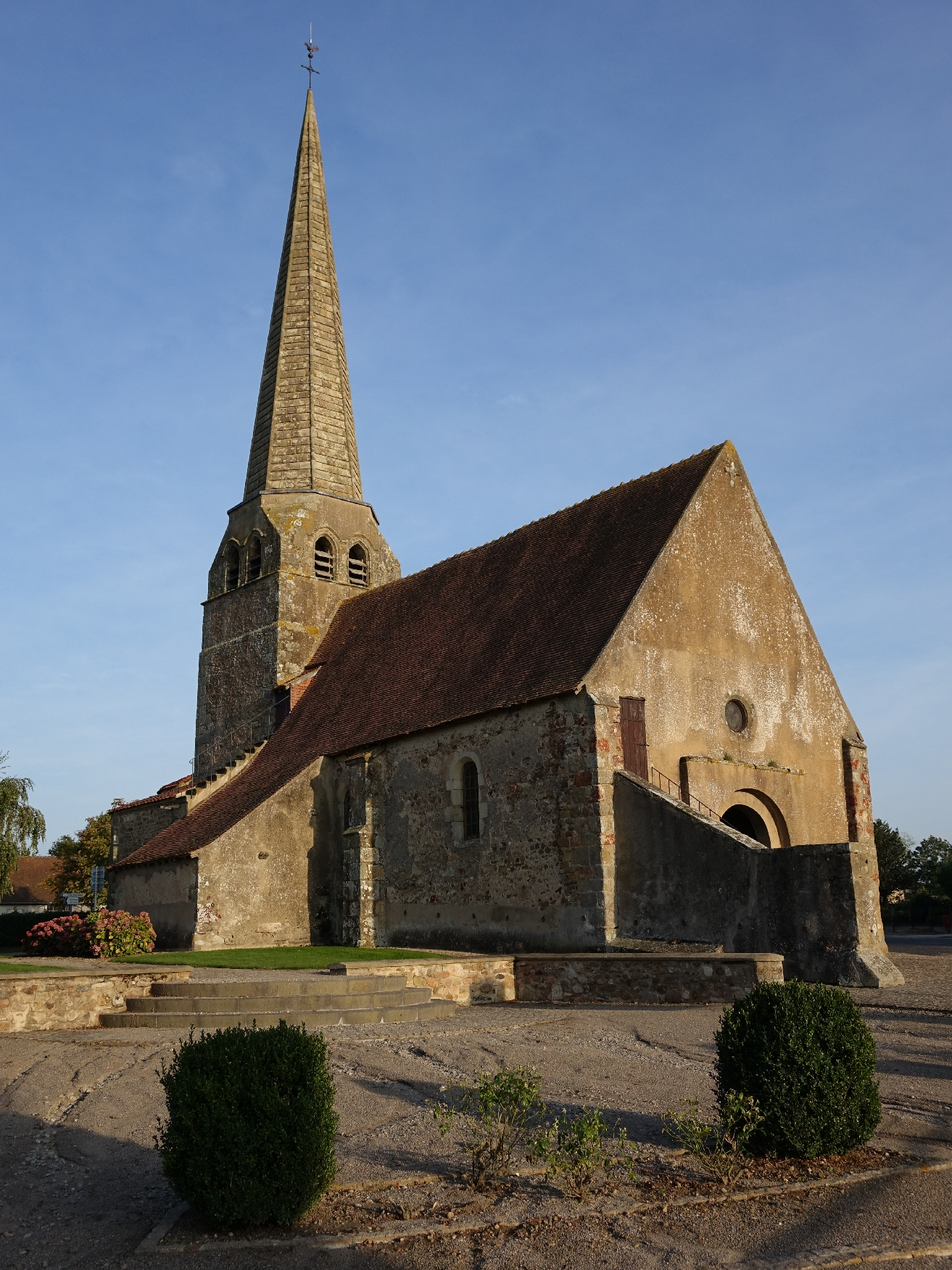
- The church in Chavenon
- Location of Chavenon
- Location within France Location within Auvergne-Rhône-Alpes
- Coordinates: 46°24′53″N 2°56′50″E
- Country: France
- Region: Auvergne-Rhône-Alpes
- Department: Allier
- Arrondissement: Montluçon
- Canton: Commentry
- Intercommunality: Commentry Montmarault Néris Communauté

Government
  - Mayor (2026–32): François Tarian
- Area^{1}: 17.47 km^{2} (6.75 sq mi)
- Elevation: 365 m (1,198 ft)
- Highest elevation: 416 m (1,365 ft)
- Lowest elevation: 265 m (869 ft)
- Population (2023): 140
  - Density: 8.0/km^{2} (21/sq mi)
- Time zone: UTC+01:00 (CET)
  - Summer (DST): UTC+02:00 (CEST)
- INSEE/Postal code: 03070 /03440
- ^{1} French Land Register data, which excludes lakes, ponds, glaciers > 1 km^{2} (0.386 sq mi or 247 acres) and river estuaries.

Chavenon (French pronunciation: [ʃavnɔ̃]; Occitan: Chavanon) is a commune in the Allier department in Auvergne in central France.

== History ==
The former name is Ecclesia de Cavenone, the name of a monastery which was destroyed in the French Revolution.

== Population ==
Historical population
Year	Pop.	±% p.a.
1968	304	—
1975	235	−3.61%
1982	179	−3.81%
1990	155	−1.78%
1999	159	+0.28%
2007	142	−1.40%
2012	129	−1.90%
2017	134	+0.76%
2023	140	+0.73%
Source: INSEE

== Transportation ==
Chavenon station, on the railway between Montluçon and Moulins, was closed for passengers in 1972.

== Government ==
The following table shows mayors of Chavenon.

Name	Start	End
Bernard Madet	2001	2008
Jean-Pierre Delsaux	2008	2014
François Tarian	2014	current

== Sights ==
- St Martin's Church, Chavenon, a 12th-century building
- Castle Montgeorges, a 16th-century building
- Château de Saint-Hubert, a 19th-century mansion and now a Russian orthodox monastery with a park drawn by the landscape gardener François-Marie Treyve
- Watermill of Veaux on the river Aumance (the last one on this French river). The Aumance is a tributary of the Cher. This mill is on the Cassini map.
- Manor of Sceauve, which is a former fief.

== Personalities ==
Born in Chavenon:

- Cécile Desliens (1853–1937), painter
- Marie Desliens (1856–1938), painter

== Heraldry ==
Coat of arms of Chavenon	French: De sinople à la fasce ondée d'argent chargée d'une bande ondée d'azur surchargée de l'inscription «CHAVENON» en lettre capitales d'argent, le tout accompagnée en pointe de saint Martin à cheval du même et en chef d'un boeuf arrêté aussi d'argent adextré d'un épi de maïs d'or et senestré d'une gerbe de blé du même.

== See also ==
- Bourbonnais
- Communes of the Allier department
