= St. Martin's Church, Zillis =

12th-century church in Zillis, Switzerland

Coordinates: 46°38′03″N 9°26′30″E

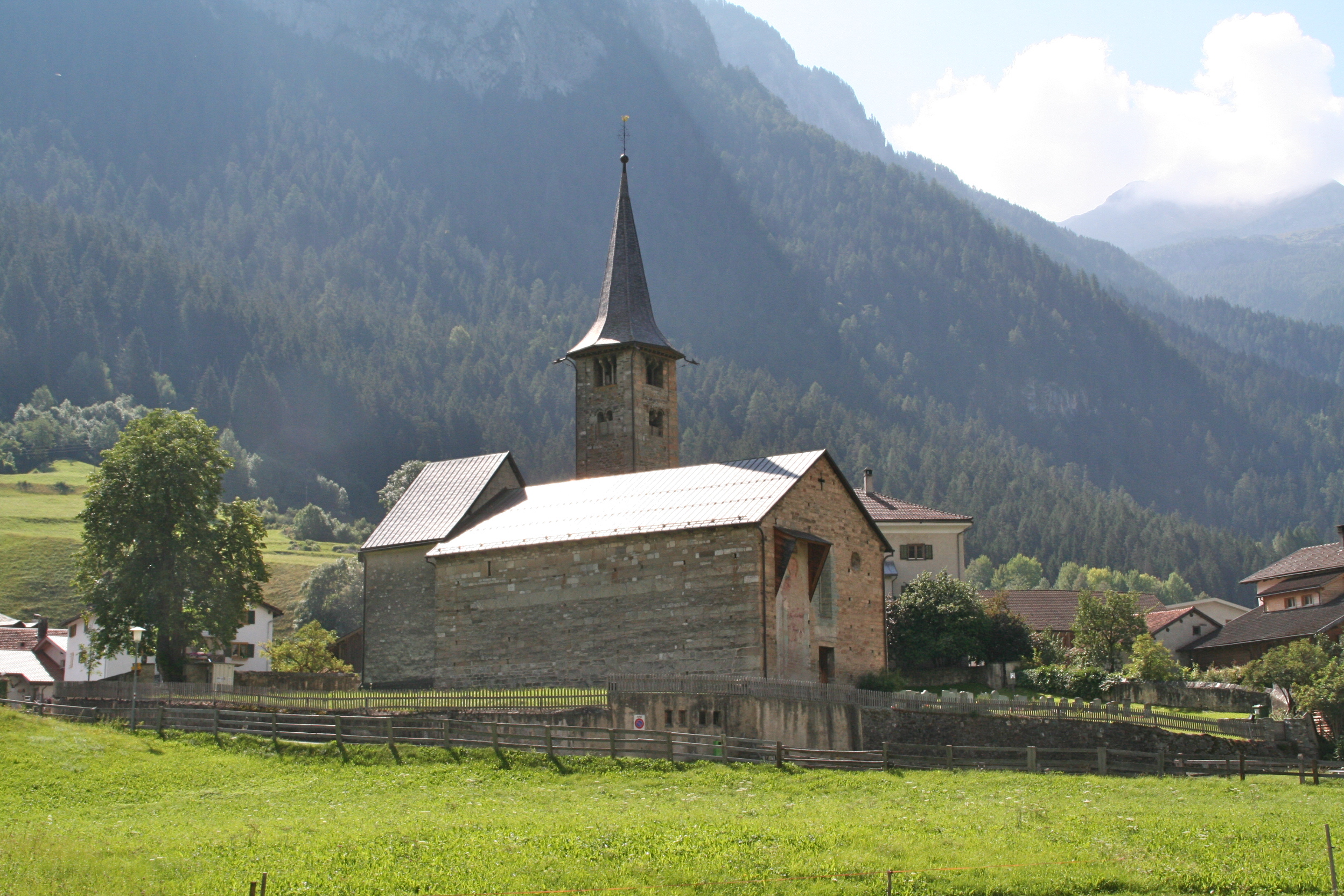
St. Martin's Church in Zillis

St. Martin's Church (German: Kirche Sankt Martin Zillis) is an aisleless church in Zillis in the canton of Grisons in Switzerland. It is a member church of the Zillis/Schamserberg parish of the Evangelisch-reformierte Landeskirche Graubünden (Reformed Church of Grisons), part of the Protestant Church of Switzerland. The current structure was built in the 12th century. It is renowned for its intricately painted ceiling, an unusually well-preserved example of Romanesque artwork of the 12th century. The church is part of the Swiss Inventory of Cultural Property of National and Regional Significance.

== History ==
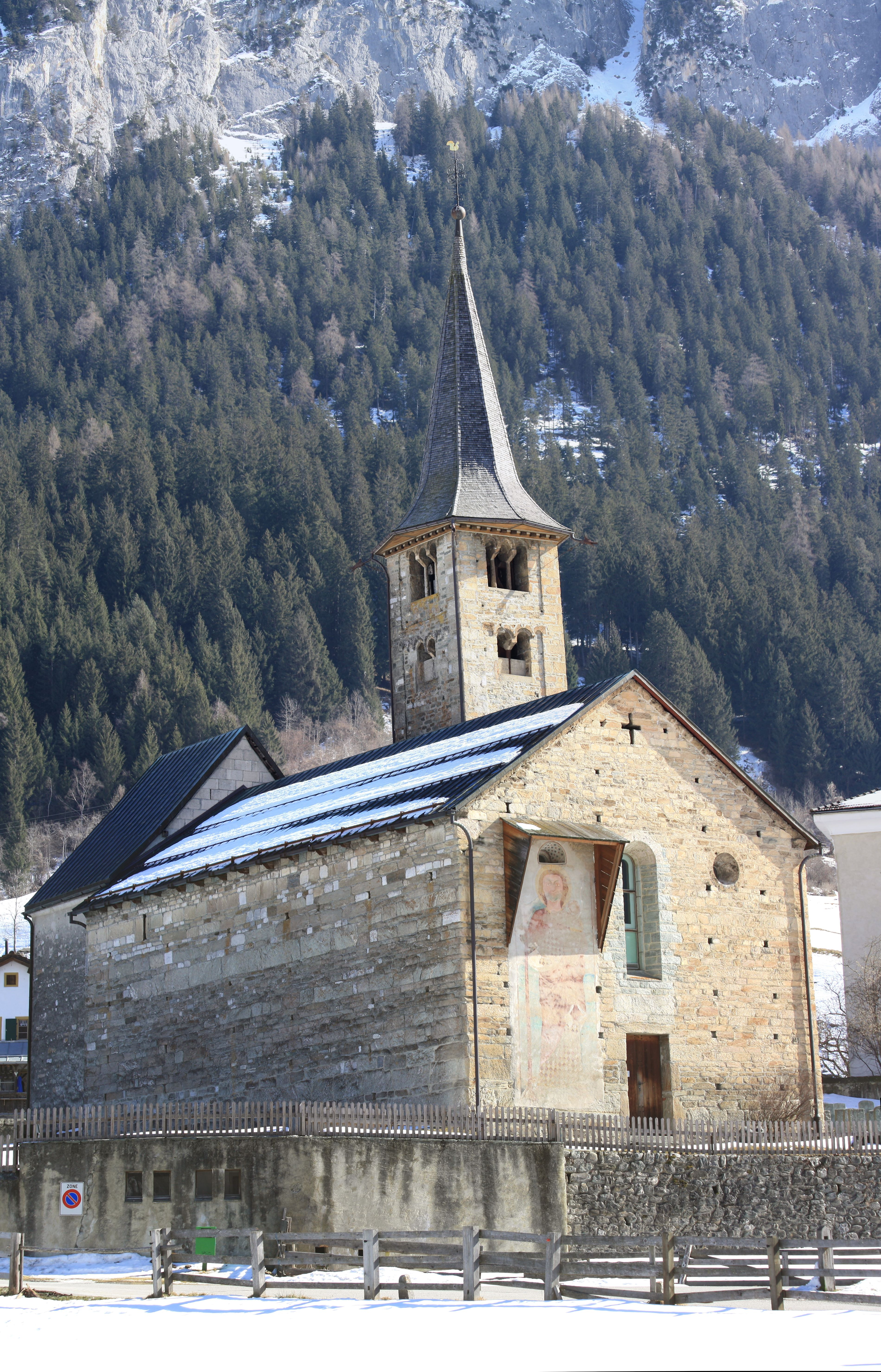
A view of the front, 2013

There was a settlement in Zillis during the late Roman Empire, although not much about it is known. Some remains from c. 2nd–4th century can be found in the area around the church. The first church appears to have been built at some point in the 5th or 6th century. Around 800, a second church was built, a three-apsed hall church. It is mentioned c. 831 in a land register of the Carolingian Empire. Emperor Otto the Great gifted the church to Bishop Waldo von Chur c. 940. Between 1096 and 1114, the nave and tower of the third and present church was constructed. (Note: Marc Antoni Nay cautions that the second church may not have been fully demolished to make way for the third church, and evidence either way is lacking. The conclusion of a fully new third church was from Poeschel's writings, so he presumably found some evidence that convinced him the second church was destroyed around 1100 in his 1938–1940 excavations, but he did not write down what it was in his articles. It is at least possible that some of the foundations and outer walls from the second church persisted.) The masonry of the nave included Cipollino marble. The painted wooden ceiling was installed at some point after 1114. The painter or painters are not known. There is a record at Chur Cathedral of a painter whose Latin name was Lopicinus dying in 1147, but all this confirms is one church-affiliated painter whose name is known. Given that the Diocese of Chur owned the church, the paintings were probably commissioned by Wido, who served as bishop in c. 1095–1122.

Between 1320 and 1340, the Waltensburger Meister, a painter who worked on many churches in Grisons, added an image of Saint Christopher to the façade of the western entrance. Christopher was a patron of pilgrims and travelers, who prayed to him for protection. In 1509, the arch was widened and raised, and a Gothic vaulted chancel was installed by the Carinthian architect Andreas Bühler. Around 1530–1535, during the turbulent years of the Reformation in Switzerland, the parish joined the Reformed church. Some of the interior wall paintings were destroyed in this period, possibly due to iconoclasm, but the ceiling survived untouched. In 1677, a new spire was installed by Peter Zurr, which remains the present spire. Larger windows may have been added to the nave as well. An inscription on a rear wall indicates that restoration and repair work was done on the ceiling in 1820, but what precisely was done and by whom is not known. Pictures of flowers were installed in the corners during this renovation.

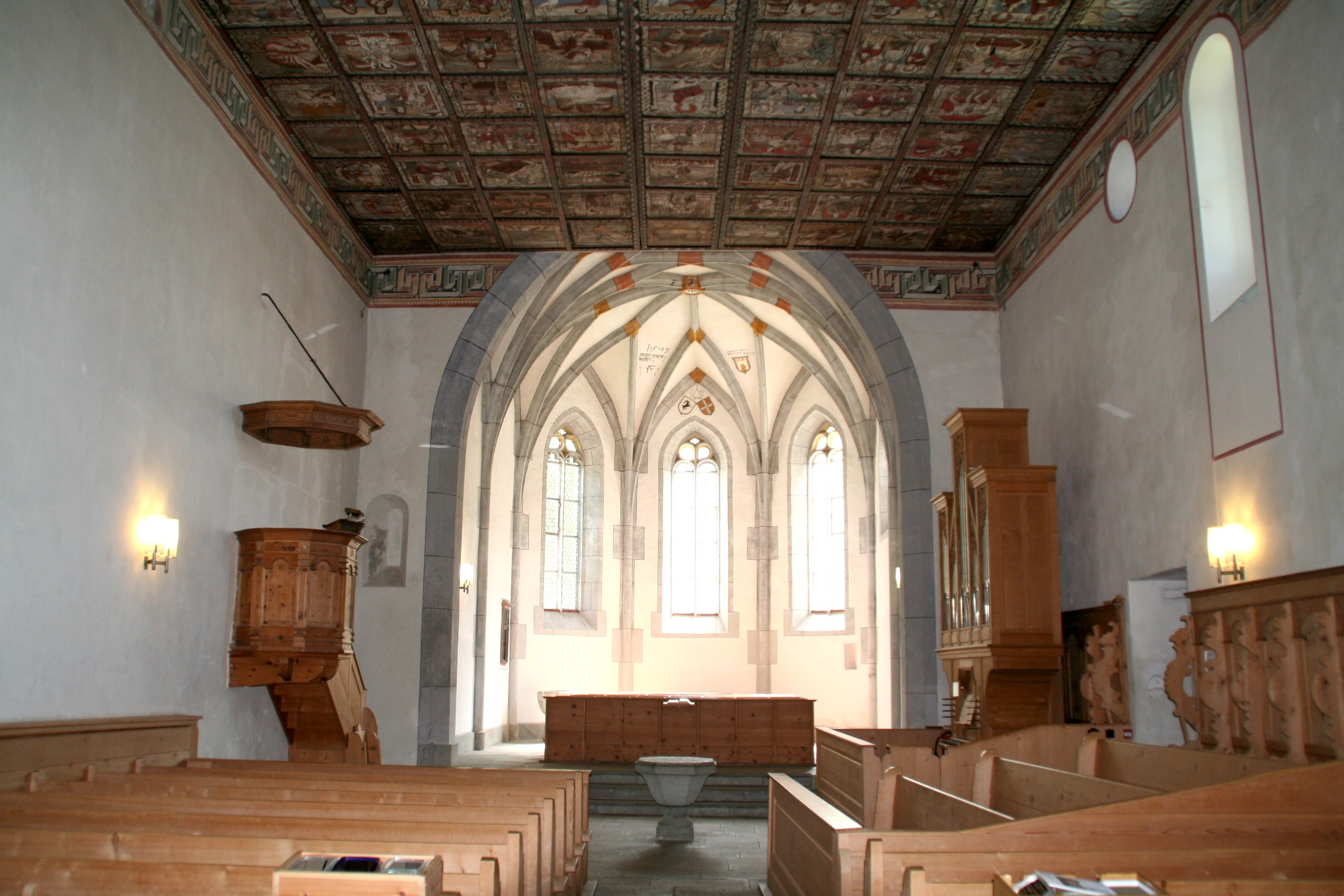
Interior of St. Martin's, 2011

Between 1938 and 1940, the church underwent extensive restoration. A new floor, new pews, new furnishings, and interior decorations were installed. Its painted ceiling was reorganized and re-mounted on new ceiling beams. The old beams were thought to be under threat from wood-boring insects, and the new ceiling included concrete sections in an attempt to improve fire safety. (Note: From contemporary knowledge of fire safety, this concrete ceiling over a wooden ceiling idea is now considered ineffective.) Missing elements were replaced with copies. Unfortunately, restorer Henri Boissonnas also applied a coating of wheatpaste to the paintings, an irreversible change that distorted their color profile and reflectivity, and has caused damage to the paintings since. Some of the original organization and art was also lost in the process. Various inscriptions of Biblical verses in the church were also lost. Further preservation and documentation work was carried out in 1971 and 1989. The 1989 preservation and restoration, headed by Christine Bläuer Böhm, has been an ongoing work of monitoring that continues to the present.

In 1975, an organ made by Felsberg was installed. In 1988, Switzerland published the first Swiss Cultural Register, and the church was included in the Swiss Inventory of Cultural Property of National Significance for Grisons as an "A-Class" entry.

In 1990, to better preserve the ceiling, the congregation held their meetings elsewhere in winter, except on special occasions such as Christmas. The heating system installed in 1940, while effective for comfort, resulted in slow but steady damage to the ceiling from the temperature and moisture fluctuations from turning it on then turning it off.

== Painted ceiling ==
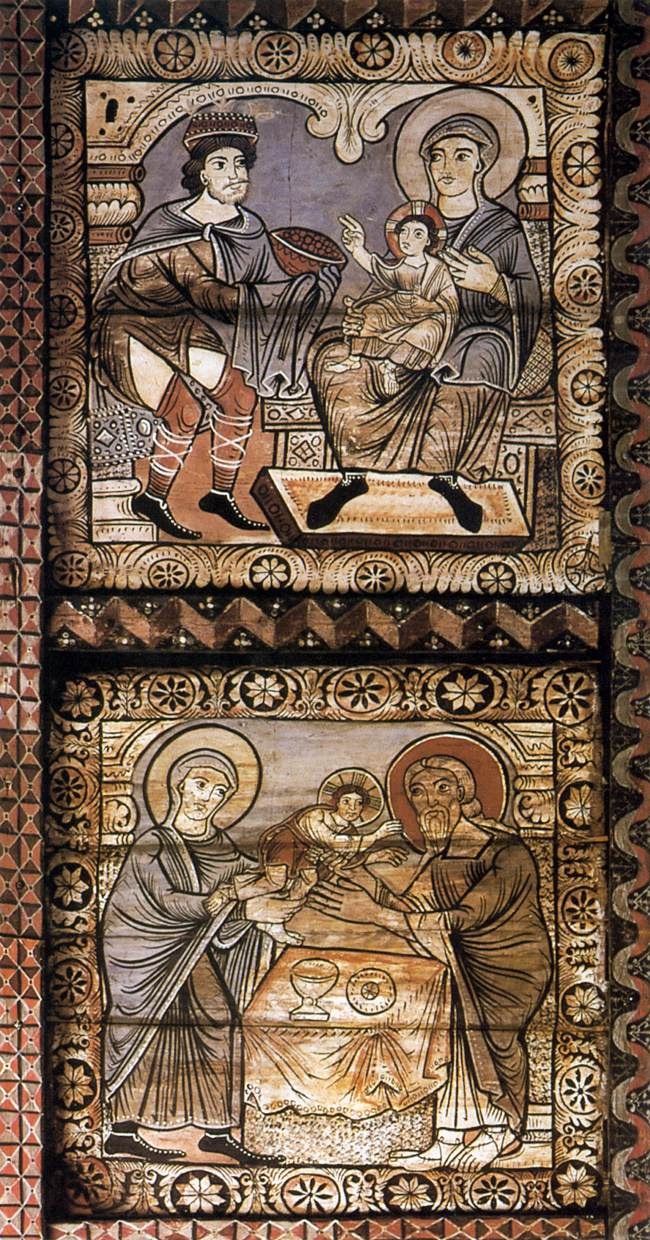
Two panels depicting the Christ Child

The church ceiling is a work of art from the High Romanesque period and one of the few works of its kind to have survived almost completely and without overpainting. Painted at some point after 1114 by an artist whose name has been lost to history, the ceiling consists of 153 square panels arranged in 9 rows of 17 panels each. Each panel is approximately 90 cm on a side. Most are made of fir wood as the base. They were first primed with a thin layer of plaster, then painted while upright, and then installed in the ceiling. The ceiling itself is mostly flat, unlike the vaulted ceilings popular in Gothic architecture. The pictures were attached to the ceiling by means of long nails before 1938.

The panels can be divided into the 48 border panels and the 105 inner panels. The border panels, with the exception of the four corner panels, depict watery scenes, many with hybridized creatures with fish tails as "sea monsters". It was thought in the era that the edges of the (known) world were bounded by water, a motif seen in many mappa mundi ("Map of the World") of the medieval period. In the four corner panels are angels, personifying the four winds and heralding the Last Judgment. Of the inner panels, 7 depict scenes from the Life of St. Martin of Tours, a hagiography describing the life of the patron namesake Saint Martin of Tours, including him sharing his cloak with a beggar. The other 98 inner panels show scenes from the life of Jesus and are considered the main highlights of the work.

The arrangement of the ceiling changed over time, and possibly even the content. During the Reformation, the order was probably altered; the sermons of John the Baptist and the Temptation of Christ were removed from the central row, and cases of miraculous healings and Jesus delivering parables replaced them. The expulsion of the moneychangers from the Temple was set directly in the center of the ceiling, replacing Jesus's baptism; the cleansing of the Temple was considered a core part of Reformation tenets as an example that Jesus would have opposed the selling of indulgences.

The paintings stop at Jesus being given the crown of thorns during his trial, and the topic switches to the legend of St. Martin. It is not known if this was the case on the original ceiling, or if the last 7 paintings had depicted Jesus's death, the Harrowing of Hell, and resurrection, and these were replaced by the Martin cycle at some early point.

The ceiling was not well-known outside of Zillis during much of the modern era. Julius Stadler, a professor at ETH Zurich, visited the church in 1863 and made sketches of the ceiling. Swiss art historian Johann Rudolf Rahn was intrigued by Stadler's work and researched further; he published articles drawing attention to the ceiling and the great antiquity of the paintings in 1870 and 1872, and published three more works by 1897. Rahn estimated at the time that the painted ceiling dated to the late 12th century or early 13th century; later scholarly estimates pushed the creation date back further.

The ceiling was majorly reworked and renovated in 1938–1940, with Erwin Poeschel handling the art restoration and structure. It is thought that the individual artworks remain nearly unchanged and were preserved during the cleaning and renovation. However, the arrangement was Poeschel's, although he stated he was restoring what he believed to be close to the original arrangement. Unfortunately, the existing state in 1938 at the start of the renovations was not closely documented, so it is not known exactly how much Poeschel revised and changed the existing structure. Dione Flühler-Kreis of the Swiss National Museum has written that the changes were likely minor though.

=== Comparable works ===
Few such Romanesque painted ceilings of the Middle Ages survived to the present day. The only other comparable ones are St. Michael's Church, Hildesheim in Germany; Peterborough Cathedral in England; and Dädesjö Old Church in Sweden. Södra Råda Old Church in Sweden survived until 2001 when it was destroyed in a fire, but has since been rebuilt in medieval style as of 2022.

=== Original pigments ===
The paintings used:

- Gesso (undercoat, glazes, white and gray)
- White lead (white, glazes)
- Red ochre / Iron oxide (red; pink as a glaze)
- Red lead (pale red)
- Vermilion (dark red)
- Green earth (green)
- Ultramarine (blue)
- Orpiment (yellow)
- Burnt umber (brown)
- Vine black (black)

Ultramarine was rare and expensive at the time, was imported from distant medieval Afghanistan. Orpiment is extremely toxic and was replaced, but probably was used in depicting backgrounds and fields. Egg tempera was used as a binding agent for the pigments.

=== Analysis ===
Susanne Brugger-Koch and Marc Antoni Nay argue that at least three separate artists painted the ceiling tiles. This theory suggests that artists "A" and "B" may have trained in the style of Milanese artists in Lombardy of the era, while artist "C" may have been a local with less formal training.

Peter Wiesmann and Iso Müller suggest influence from Byzantine art.

=== Gallery ===
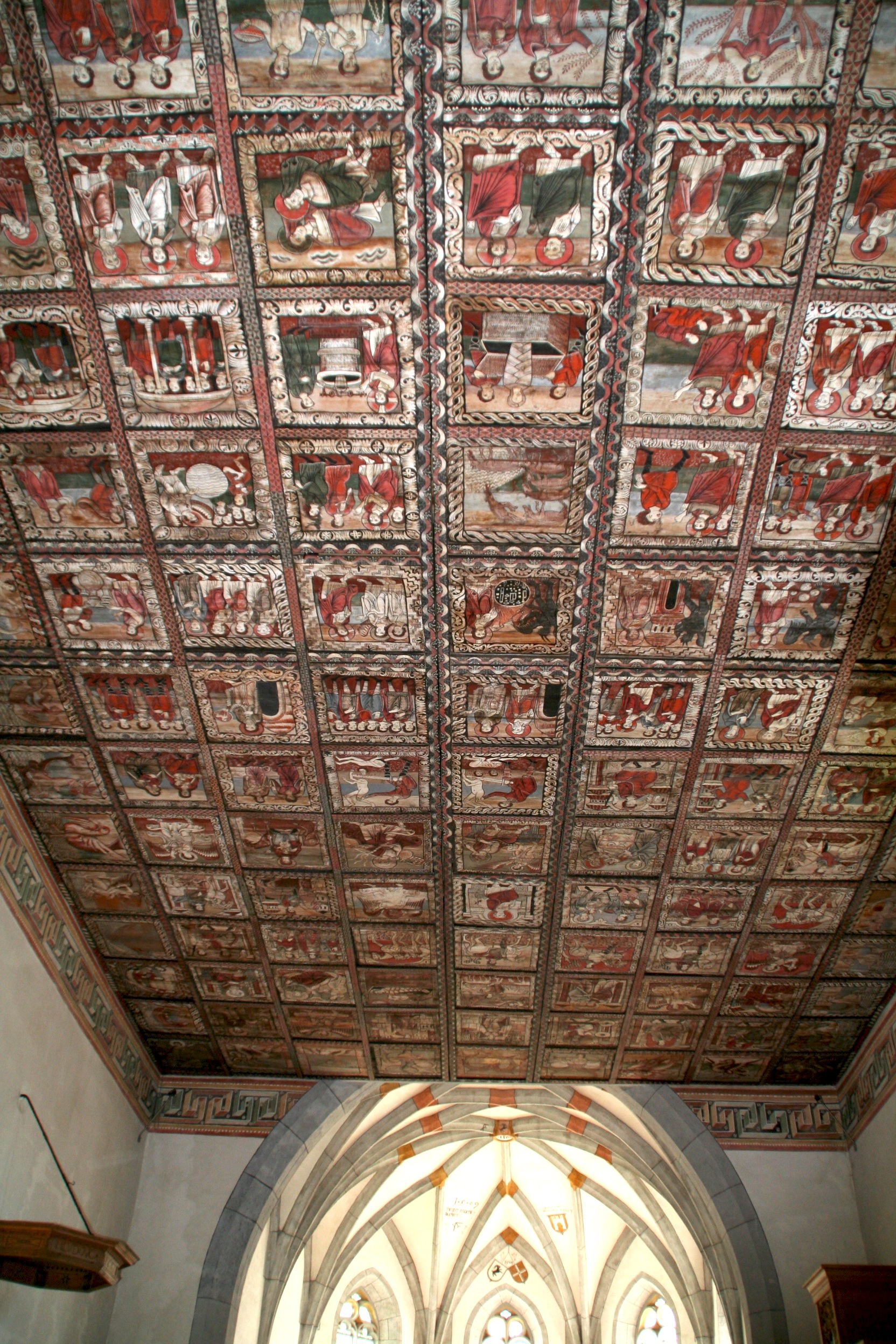
The painted ceiling of the church

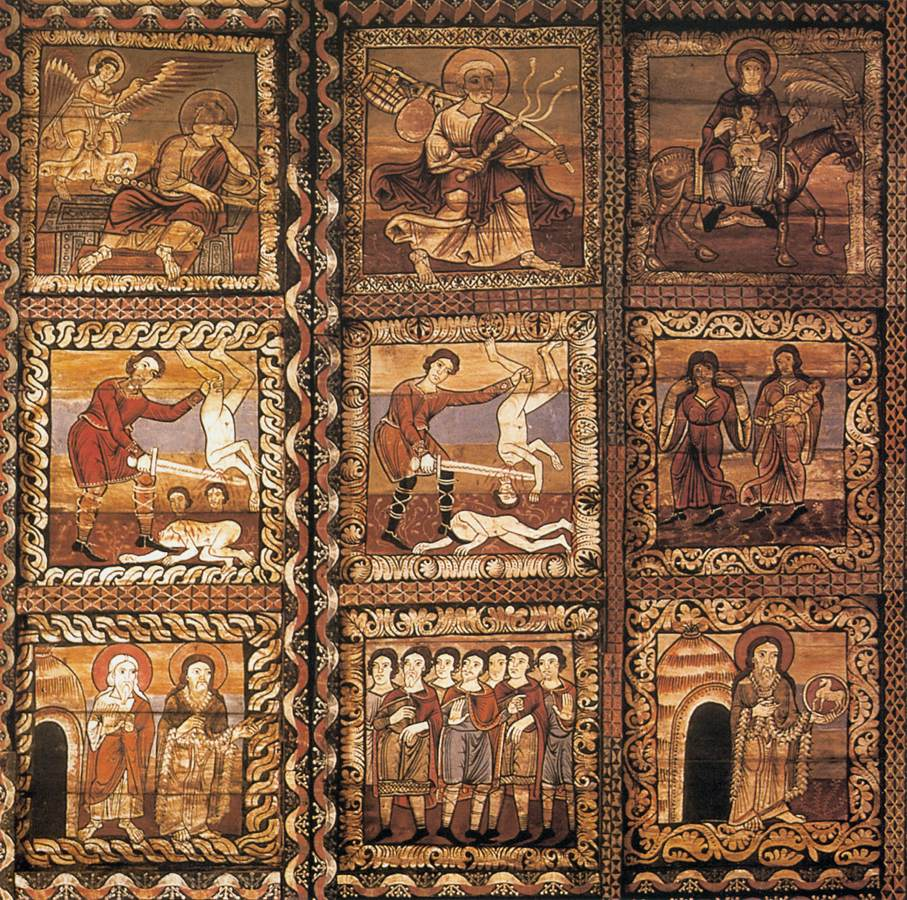
Nine example panels

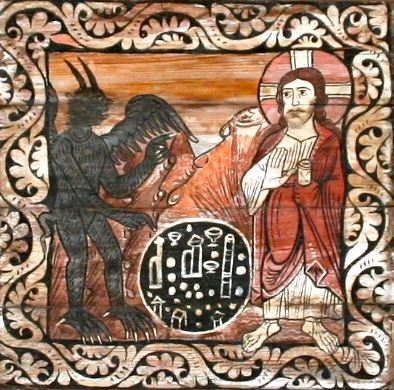
Jesus tempted in the wilderness by the devil

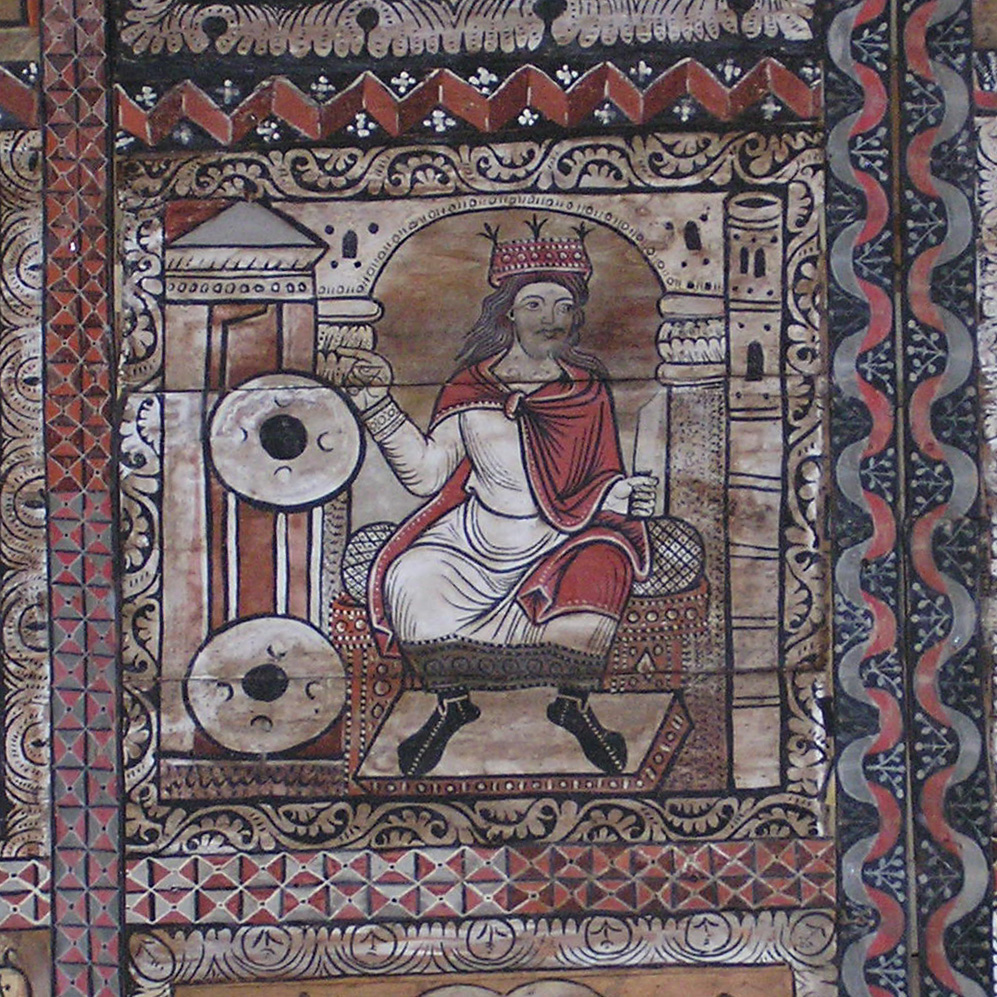
A close-up of one panel

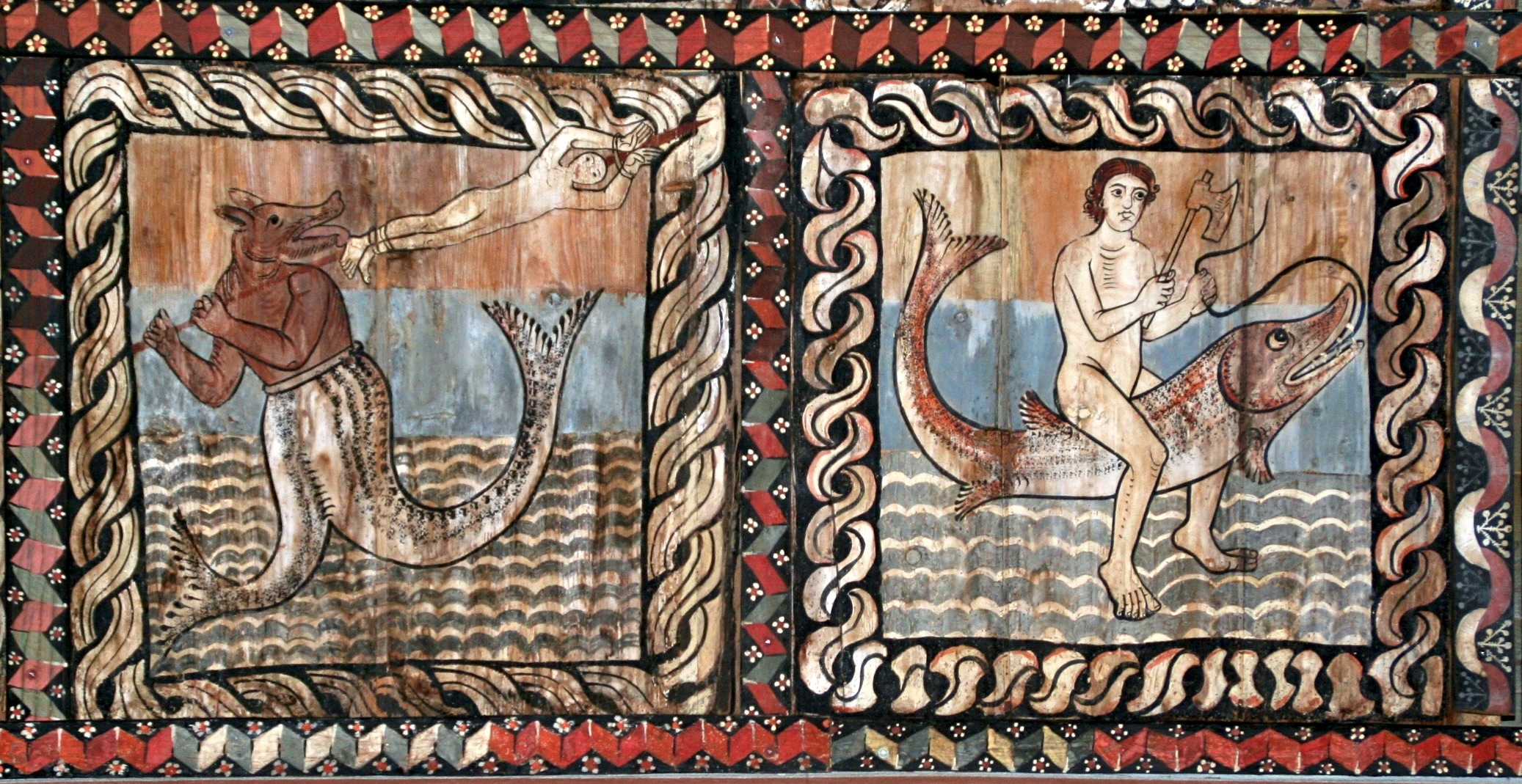
Sea monsters on the edge; the left panel is an example of the fish tail attached to a land-based creature

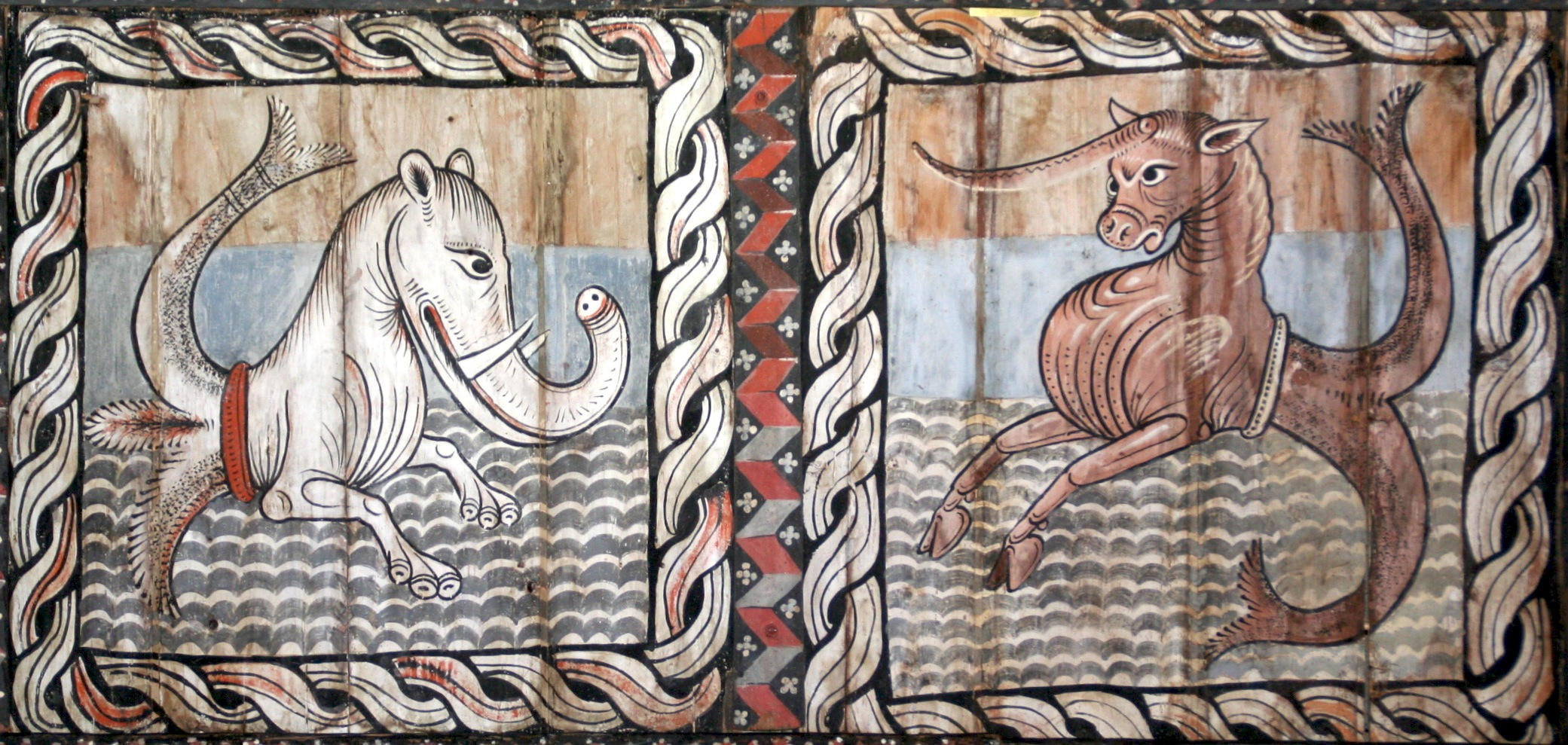
Sea monsters

== Bibliography ==
- Bläuer Böhm, Christine; Rutishauser, Hans; Nay, Marc Antoni, eds. (1997). Die romanische Bilderdecke der Kirche St. Martin in Zillis: Grundlagen zur Konservierung und Pflege [The Romanesque Picture Ceiling of Zillis: Fundamentals of Conservation and Care]. ISBN 978-3258055794.
- Brugger-Koch, Susanne (1981). Die romanische Bilderdecke von St. Martin, Zillis (Graubünden): Stil und Ikonographie [The Romanesque Painted Ceiling of St. Martin, Zillis (Grisons): Style and Iconography] (Dissertation) (in German). University of Basel.
- Nay, Marc Antoni (2008). St Martin's Church in Zillis, canton Graubünden. Translated by Pratt, Jenny Haller. Society for the History of Swiss Art. ISBN 978-3-85782-835-5.
- Nay, Marc Antoni (2015). Die Bilderdecke von Zillis: Grundlagen und Versuch einer Rekonstruktion [The painted ceiling of Zillis: Foundations and a possible reconstruction]. Desertina. ISBN 978-3-85637-475-4.
