= St Martin's Church, Chavenon =

Coordinates: 46°24′30.59″N 2°56′27.59″E

St Martin Church, Chavenon
- Église Saint-Martin de Chavenon
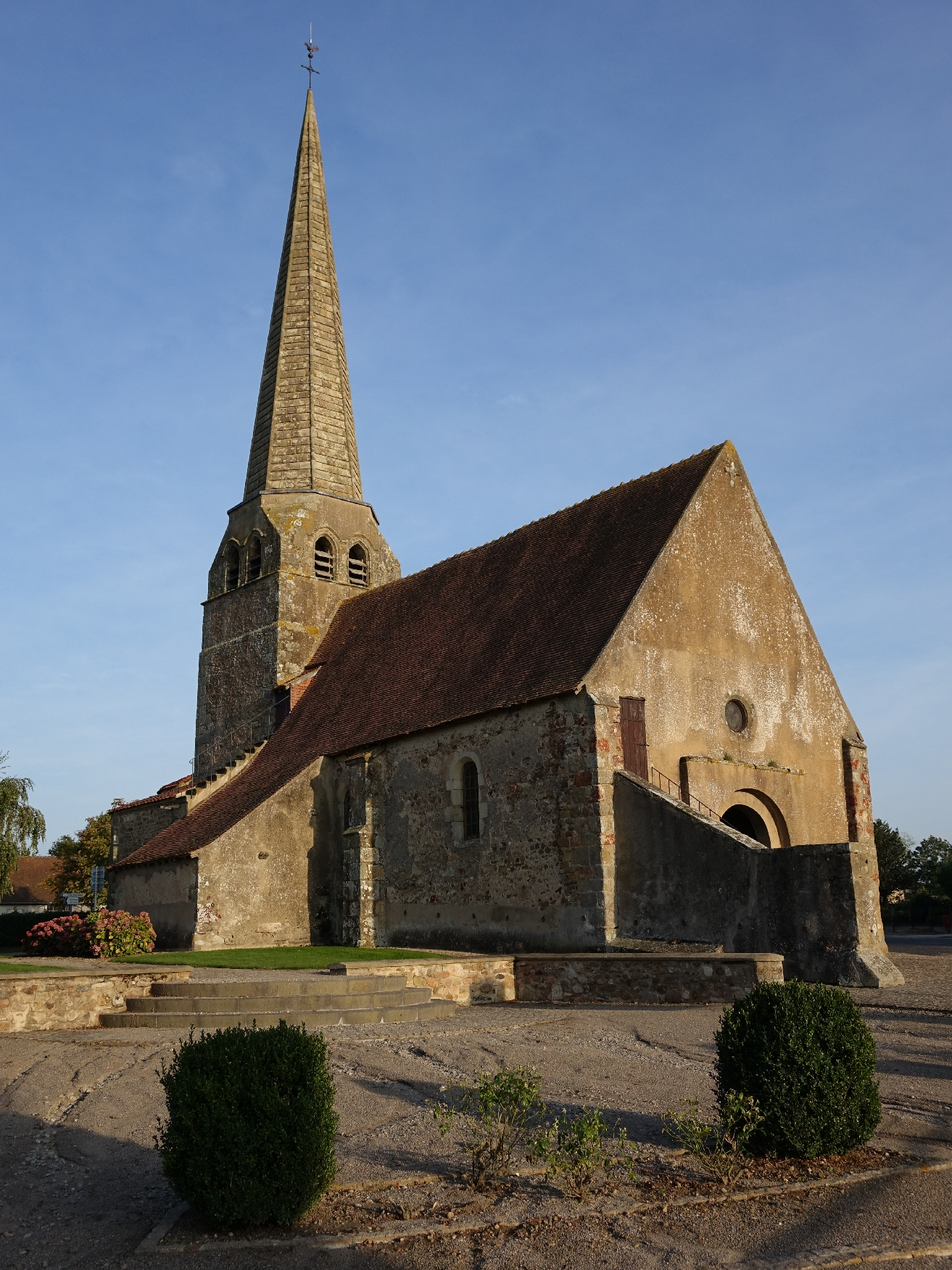
- Saint-Martin church in Chavenon
- St Martin Church, Chavenon
- Location: Chavenon
- Country: France

History
- Dedication: Saint Martin

L'église Saint-Martin is a church in Chavenon in the Allier département in the Auvergne Region.

== History ==
The church was erected in the 12th century. This church belongs to the Diocese of Moulins, suffragan of the archdiocese of Clermont. It is a listed historical monument since 1933.

== Note ==
- Summed up and translated from the equivalent article at French Wikipédia, 29 May 2008
