= Obernau (Sieg) =

River in Germany

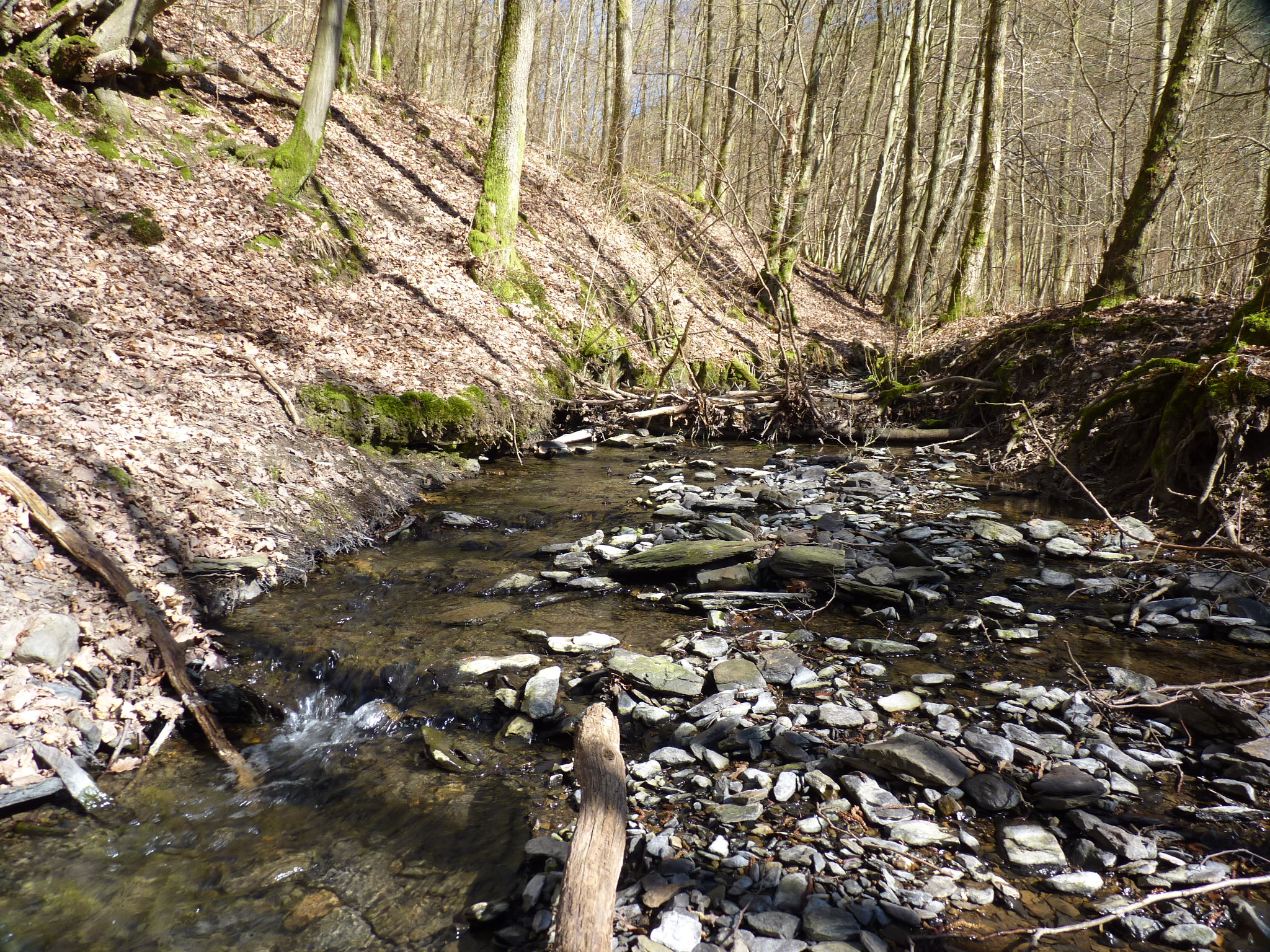

Location
- Country: Germany
- States: North Rhine-Westphalia

Physical characteristics
- Mouth
  - location: Sieg
  - coordinates: 50.9094°N 8.1073°E

Basin features
- Progression: Sieg→ Rhine→ North Sea

Obernau is a small river of North Rhine-Westphalia, Germany. It is 6.3 km (3.9 mi) long and flows as a right tributary into the Sieg in Netphen.

== See also ==
- List of rivers of North Rhine-Westphalia
