= Georges-Jacques Aelsters =

Flemish carillonneur (1770–1849)

Georges-Jacques Aelsters (1770 – 11 April 1849) was a carillonneur and composer from Ghent.

He was born into a musical family at Ghent. He was carillonneur of that town from 1788 to 1839. He was also for fifty years director of the music at the St. Martin's Church, and composer of much church music still performed well after his death in Flanders, especially a Miserere.
