= St. Martin's Catholic Church =

Historic church in Ohio, United States

- U.S. National Register of Historic Places
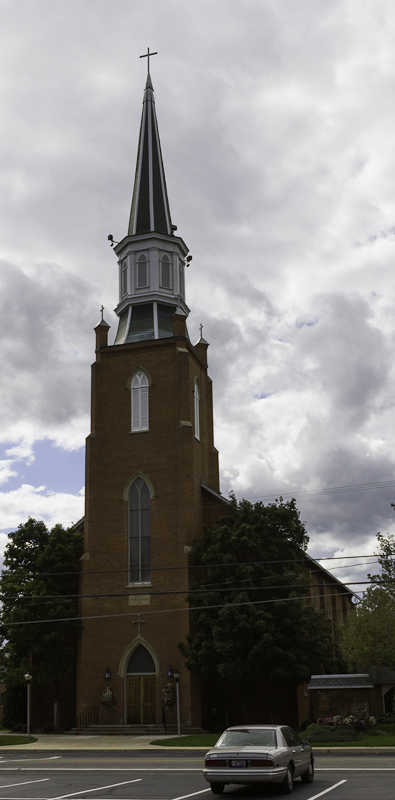

- Location within Ohio Location within the United States
- Nearest city: Valley City, Ohio
- Coordinates: 41°13′30″N 81°57′18″W
- Area: less than one acre
- Built: 1861
- Architect: Keely, Patrick
- Architectural style: Gothic
- NRHP reference No.: 75001486
- Added to NRHP: November 12, 1975

St. Martin of Tours Catholic Church is a parish of the Catholic Church in Valley City, Ohio, in the Diocese of Cleveland. It is noted for its historic church, which was built in 1861 and added to the National Register of Historic Places in 1975.
