= St Martin's Church, Torgnon =

St Martin's Church
- Chiesa di San Martino (Italian); Église Saint-Martin (French)
- St Martin's parish church, Torgnon, in 2025
- Click on the map for a fullscreen view
- 45°48′05.63″N 7°34′14.69″E
- Location: Torgnon
- Country: Italy
- Denomination: Roman Catholic

Architecture
- Functional status: Active

Administration
- Diocese: Diocese of Aosta

The St Martin's Church (Italian: Chiesa di San Martino; French: Église Saint-Martin) is a Roman Catholic church located in Torgnon, Italy.

== History ==
The earliest historical records concerning the church date back to 1413. However, the present Neo-Gothic building dates from 1868. Local materials were used for its construction and were transported free of charge by the inhabitants. The bell tower, on the other hand, dates back to 1773.

The building underwent its most recent major restoration between 2002 and 2003, which included the replacement of the roof coverings and the repainting of the exterior façades.

== Description ==
The church, located in the hamlet of Mongnod, has a three-aisled layout, with the aisles separated by columns. The furnishings are mostly Neo-Gothic in style, with the exception of the marble altar, which was previously fitted with wooden panels.

The church façade is decorated with paintings set within false lancet windows and roundels. At the top, in a lancet window at the centre, Christ is depicted, flanked by two angels, each set within a roundel. Above the wooden portal, which is itself surmounted by pinnacles, there is a depiction of the Virgin and Child.

The bell tower stands on the right-hand side of the church. Romanesque in style, it has a low-arched entrance and a belfry divided into two levels, each marked by a row of double-arched windows.
