= St. Martin's Church, Netphen =

13th-century church in Germany

Coordinates: 50°54′42″N 8°6′28″E

St. Martin's Church (German: Martinikirche) is a 13th-century three-nave hall church located in Netphen, Germany. Apart from St. Nicholas' Church in Siegen, it is the most significant Romanesque edifice in Siegerland.

== Overview ==
The earliest documentary evidence of its existence dates back to 1239AD. It constituted one of the earliest parishes in Siegerland and remains the active centre of the Protestant Reformed Church of Netphen.

Services in St. Martin's are celebrated every Sunday at 10.00am in the German language.
