= Netphen =

- Town
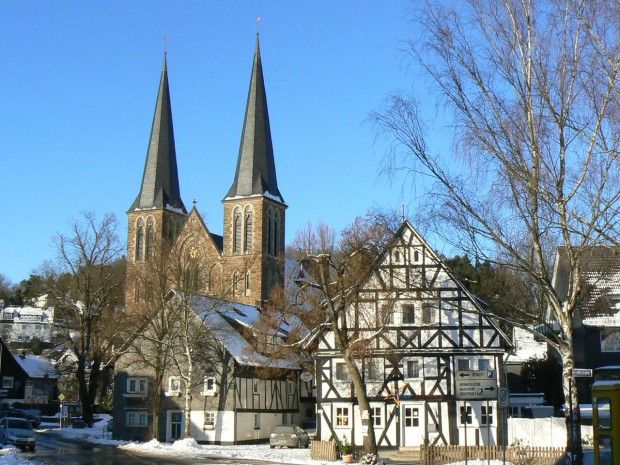

- Coat of arms

- Location of Netphen within Siegen-Wittgenstein district
- Interactive map of Netphen
- Location within Germany Location within North Rhine-Westphalia
- Coordinates: 50°54′53″N 8°6′0″E
- Country: Germany
- State: North Rhine-Westphalia
- Admin. region: Arnsberg
- District: Siegen-Wittgenstein

Government
  - Mayor (2020–25): Paul Wagener

Area
  - Total: 137.39 km^{2} (53.05 sq mi)
- Elevation: 260–676 m (853–2,218 ft)

Population (2025-12-31)
  - Total: 22,972
  - Density: 167.20/km^{2} (433.05/sq mi)
- Time zone: UTC+01:00 (CET)
  - Summer (DST): UTC+02:00 (CEST)
- Postal codes: 57250
- Dialling codes: 02738
- Vehicle registration: SI
- Website: www.netphen.de

Netphen (German pronunciation: [ˈnɛtfən]) is a town in the Siegen-Wittgenstein district, in North Rhine-Westphalia, Germany. It lies on the river Sieg, roughly 7 km northeast of Siegen.

== Geography ==
=== Location ===
Netphen lies on the Rothaargebirge's southern slope and forms the natural boundary of the Wittgensteiner Land. The municipal area is made up of many dales and mountain ridges. Northeast of the constituent community of Walpersdorf lies the source of the river Sieg and in the Lahnhof – another constituent community whose name takes the definite article – lies the source of the river Lahn.

== Population ==
Historical population

Year	Pop.	±% p.a.
1965	18,392	—
1970	20,435	+2.13%
1975	21,630	+1.14%
1980	22,437	+0.74%
1985	22,564	+0.11%
1990	23,293	+0.64%
1995	24,897	+1.34%

Year	Pop.	±% p.a.
2000	25,034	+0.11%
2005	24,679	−0.29%
2010	24,101	−0.47%
2015	23,393	−0.59%
2020	23,033	−0.31%
2025	22,972	−0.05%

Source: Landesdatabank Nordrhein-Westfalen

== Constituent communities ==
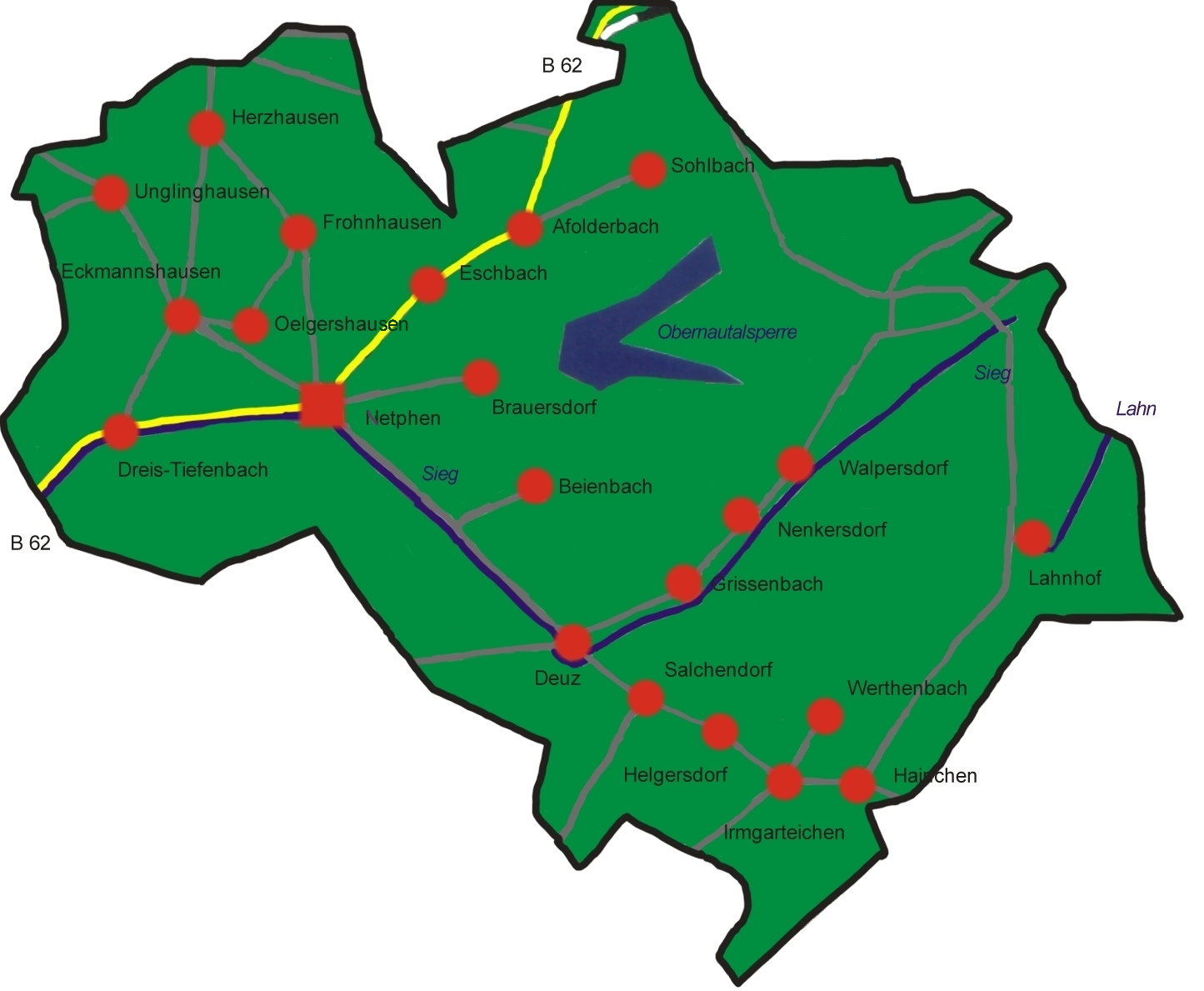
Constituent communities

=== Afholderbach ===
This constituent community of Netphen has a population of around 205 as of 31 December 2013. The area is around 5.9 km^{2} The first mention of the area was on 13 February 1345 as "afelterbach".

=== Beienbach ===
The constituent community of Beienbach lies at the end of a small side dale of the Sieg between Netphen and Deuz and is fringed by spruce and broadleaf forest on the heights and by agricultural areas as well as old "fruit meadows" (where various fruit trees grow) right at the edge of the community. It is also crossed by the Katzenbach. It had its first documentary mention in 1299.

=== Brauersdorf ===
Brauersdorf lies near the Netphen Leisure Park (Netphener Freizeitpark) with its swimming pool, ice skating rink, fitness and sport centre, miniature golf course, and so on. Furthermore, the community lies right at the Obernau Dam.

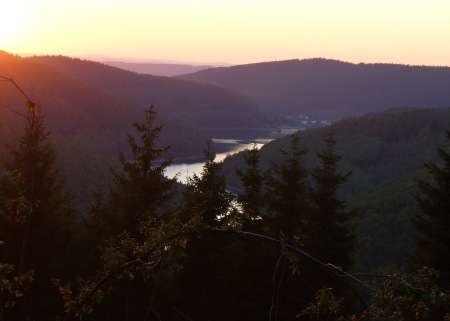
Brauersdorf

=== Deuz ===
Owing to its advantageous location, Deuz became the first industrial community in the old Amt of Netphen. Moving the Irle iron foundry from Kaan-Marienborn to Deuz is viewed as an economic birth. Over the years, further businesses have set up shop in Deuz.

=== Dreis-Tiefenbach ===
Dreis-Tiefenbach is, with its population of about 5300, Netphen's biggest constituent community, lying about 262 to 350 m above sea level on an area of some 7.5 km^{2}. It is roughly 6 km from Siegen and 4 km from Netphen (main town). Dreis-Tiefenbach lies on Federal Highway (Bundesstraße) 62, which joins with the Hüttentalstraße. The community's environs consist of relatively broad, thick mixed forest and broad meadows. Dreis-Tiefenbach was likely once settled by Celts. It had its first documentary mention in 1239.

=== Frohnhausen ===
Frohnhausen lies roughly 2 km from Netphen (main town). As of 2005, some 470 people live there. The community ranges from 350 to 540 m above sea level, and roughly 70% of it is wooded, with the rest made up of fields, meadows, and built-up areas.

The heart of the village consists mainly of half-timbered houses protected as monuments and built in the 17th and 18th centuries.

=== Grissenbach ===
Grissenbach lies in Netphen's east, right at the foot of the Rothaargebirge Nature Park. As with Frohnhausen, 70% of the community is wooded, with the rest made up of fields, meadows, and built-up areas. The community ranges from 336 to 530 m above sea level, and has an area of 4.6 km^{2}.

As of June 2005, Grissenbach is home to 894 people, giving it a population density of 194/km^{2}, considerably lower than the average for the Federal Republic of Germany (about 230/km^{2}).

=== Hainchen ===
Population development
Year	Pop.	±%
1939	439	—
1975	768	+74.9%
2005	1000+	—

Hainchen's area encompasses 10.7 km^{2}, 6.5 km^{2} of which is wooded, with the rest made up of meadows and built-up areas. The boundary runs for roughly 8 km along the border with Hesse. As well, Hainchen borders on the town of Bad Laasphe in the north and in the south on the community of Wilnsdorf. The difference in elevation between the entrance to the community and the exit from it at the Hessian border is 96 m (384 to 480 m).

From the entrance to the Geiersgrundbach Valley to the boundary with Bad Laasphe, the difference in elevation is 190 m.

The community has developed from one of small handicraft businesses and independent farmers to an industrial community nowadays, with two prefabricated house companies, one mechanical workshop and four service-sector businesses setting up shop here. Furthermore, there are four businesses using agricultural land, two of which are major landholders.

All together, there are 129 registered jobs in the community. The overwhelming majority of workers commute to neighbouring areas (Greater Siegen, neighbouring areas in Hesse). An advantage to the community is the nearby A 45, only 14 km away and reachable in a matter of minutes. The advantageous transport links have also had something to do with revitalizing the hiking trails along the Rothaarsteig, 7 km of which run through Hainchen.

Hainchen also has a castle, the Burg Hainchen, built in the heights with a moat. It has been standing at least since 1290, the year when it was first mentioned in a document.

=== Welgersdorf ===
Some 400 people live in Welgersdorf. Things to see there include the Mahnglockenturm (bell tower), the Backes (an old bakehouse), the old mill and Saint Elisabeth's Chapel. Here, too, the Wurstekommission – "Sausage Commission" – has been represented since 1919 (this is an organization dedicated mostly to scaring away evil spirits at New Year's Eve; they get their name from the door-to-door sausage donations that they seek for the attendant festival).

=== Herzhausen ===
Herzhausen was for a long time an independent community, but is now a constituent community of Netphen. Lying in the middle of the Rothaargebirge, Herzhausen is even now still shaped by agriculture and forestry as well as ancient Siegerland traditions such as the Hauberg (a long-standing practice of coöperative forestry in this region) or the Martinsfeuer, or Saint Martin's Fire, a custom on Saint Martin's Day (11 November). The high point of the year is the yearly shooting festival, known far beyond the regional bounds.

Herzhausen lies on the state highway (Landesstraße) between Dreis-Tiefenbach and Hilchenbach. In 2005, a citizens' club was founded. Also once found in Herzhausen was the district garbage dump. The storage of household rubbish there, however, is no longer allowed, and it is now used as an earth dump. Further trash is now sorted for incineration and forwarded.

=== Irmgarteichen ===
Roughly 900 people call Irmgarteichen home. It was once a community with great (ecclesiastical) importance. In Irmgarteichen, many clubs have had a hand in shaping the community as it is today. Very important rites are Drette Krestach and the Osterfeuer of the Hermedeicher Jonge.

=== Nenkersdorf ===
Nenkersdorf lies east of the constituent community of Grissenbach. The historic watermill on the eastern edge of the community is said to be particularly worth seeing.

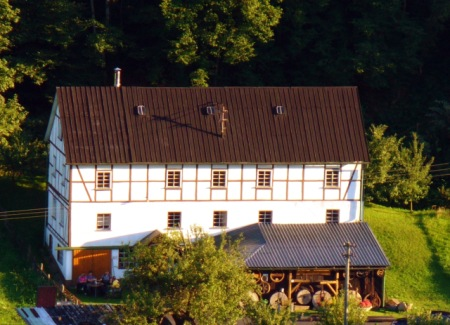
Mill in Nenkersdorf

=== Lahnhof ===
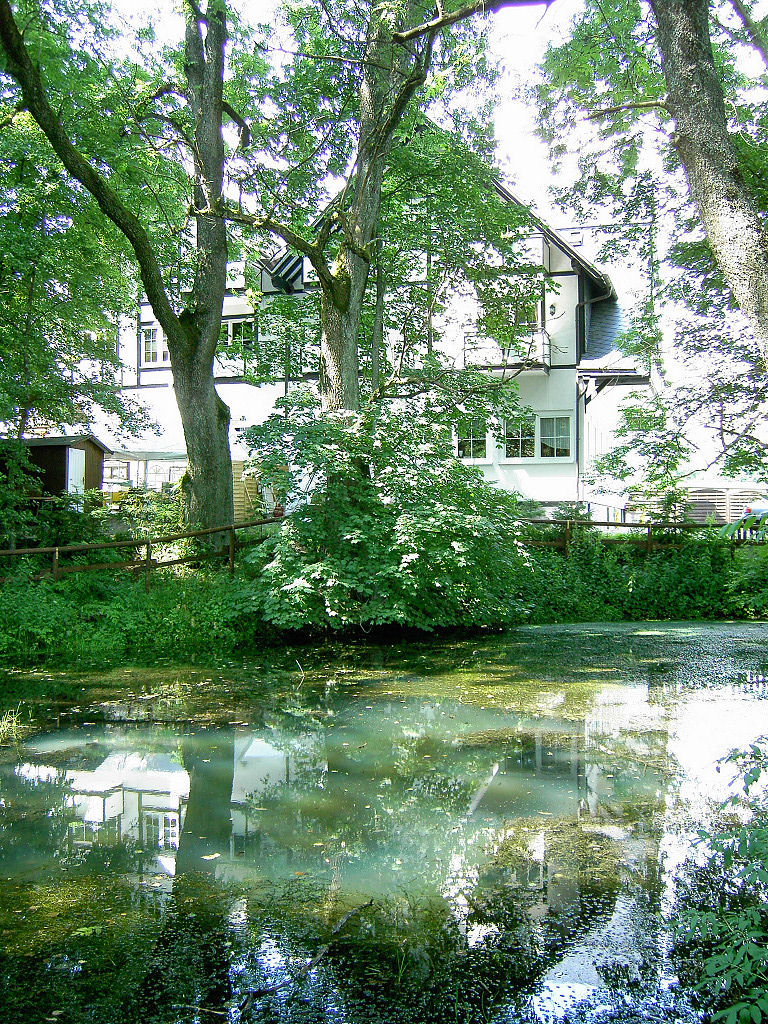
Source of the Lahn in the Lahnhof

The Lahnhof, whose name takes the definite article (always der/den/dem Lahnhof, des Lahnhof(e)s in German), lies in the southeast Rothaargebirge at a height of 607 m above sea level. Its name first appeared in a document in 1333. Right nearby rise the rivers Lahn, Sieg and Eder. The pristine nature has led the Lahnhof to become a much loved local outing destination.

=== Salchendorf ===
Since at least 1920 there has been in Salchendorf a youth association called the Wurstekommission (see Helgersdorf above) which has about 50 active members, 14 of whom are on the council of elders. In the middle of the village has stood since 1995 the Wurstekommission Memorial.

A Salchendorf portal is in the planning stage.

=== Walpersdorf ===
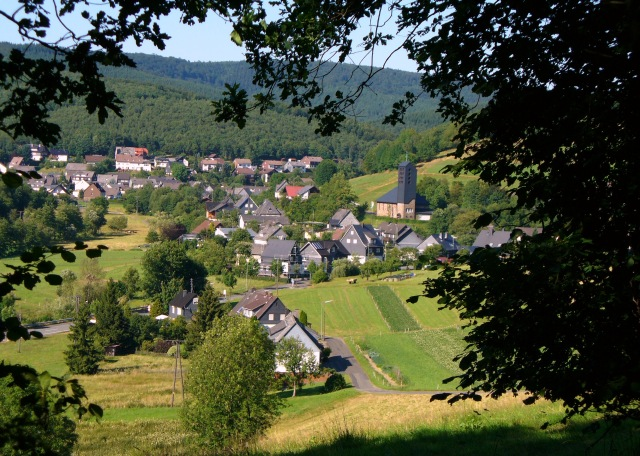
Walpersdorf

Walpersdorf had its first documentary mention in 1344. It is well known for its charcoal kilns and nature reserve with its snowflake meadows. Geographically, Walpersdorf, the first place on the river Sieg, lies at the edge of the Rothaarsteig hiking trail. About 3 km away rise the rivers Sieg, Lahn and Eder.

=== Werthenbach ===
Wertenbach was once an independent community. It came into being sometime between 900 and 1300 and has an adjusted area of 9.37 km^{2}, meaning that the area was once greater, but early in the 18th century, former border forests and protected woodlands belonging to the local lord were merged with neighbouring communities.

Werthenbach, unlike other constituent communities' names like Sohlbach, Beienbach, Grissenbach, and so on, is not the community's original name, but rather it was once called Werthenbrecht. The placename element brecht that occurred in the name before it was corrupted can be compared to the common mountain name Bracht, and in the Rhenish Slate Mountains can still be found as a description for newer "clearing" communities.

Werthenbach's earliest mentions:

- 1336 Hartmann von Wertinbrecht
- 1343 Hartmann von Wertinbracht
- 1344 Wernckenbracht.

In 1343, the Lords of Bicken relinquished an estate (actually a Hauberg – see Herzhausen above) to the villagers in what was then called Wertinbracht as long as they paid a yearly fee for this favour to the Monastery of Keppel. The earnings from the Bicken estates in 1447 amounted to a "tithe of 7 Malter of corn, 11 Malter of oats" (a Malter being "15 pieces", so 105 and 165 respectively). Eleven houses stood on monastery land in 1566.

A few meadows in Werthenbach have names bearing witness to the old landlords' ownership or rights. Zehntwiese, for instance, refers to Zehnten – tithes.

The Herrenberg (mountain) has a name suggesting lordly ownership ("Herr" means "lord").

The local "Hauberg" forestry coöperative, popularly called "Kloster" ("Monastery") evokes the Keppel Monastery's historical ownership of the land.

In Werthenbach, on the street "Am Heller", 5 holiday cottages are to be built by 2007. Despite considerable protest from some quarters of the village community, the holiday village was approved on 27 March 2006 by the Netphen Town Development Board. Critics hold that it is unfair that rather than private houses, holiday cottages are being built on these lots. They will be built by a local prefabricated house company.

== History ==
The earliest mention of this region of Siegen-Wittgenstein goes back to the 11th century. Here, as in most parts of the old Siegen district, the princely House of Nassau is named as the local overlords.

In 1215, the Lords of Hain were mentioned as being at Hainchen Castle.

From 1635 to 1637 raged the Plague.

In 1742, Netphen, like all other places north of the Lahn, passed to Prince Wilhelm Karl Friso of Orange, Prince of Diez and heir to the United Netherlands, thereby making the Principality of Nassau-Siegen part of the Netherlands.

Napoleon added the Siegerland to the Grand Duchy of Berg as part of his rearrangement of Germany. This change was, however, undone in 1813 and Netphen once again became Orange domain. In 1815, the House of Orange forwent all its German possessions and Netphen passed to Prussia in 1816.

On 1 January 1969, as part of municipal reform, the greater community of Netphen came into being. On 30 June 1997, Netphen's population reached the 25,000 mark, thereby earning it town status. This was not made official, however, until just before the turn of the millennium, on 1 January 2000.

== Politics ==
=== Mayors ===
- 1969–1989: Gerhard Josef Zimmermann (CDU)
- 1989–1994: Helmut Buttler (SPD)
- 1994–2009: Rüdiger Bartsch (independent)
- 2009–present: Paul Wagener (independent)

=== Town council ===
The town council's 38 seats are apportioned thus, in accordance with municipal elections held on 25 May 2014 and 21 September 2014.

- CDU 15 seats
- SPD 10 seats
- Greens 2 seats
- FDP 1 seats
- UWG 5 seats
- Die Linke 1 seat

Note: UWG is a citizens' coalition.

=== Coat of arms ===
Netphen's civic coat of arms might heraldically be described thus: Per fess, azure semee of billets a demi-lion Or armed and langued gules and Or a boar saltant sable langued gules.

The lion is from Nassau's arms. The springing boar is copied from the oldest preserved seal of the Siegerland Court, from 1467. It belonged to the "Schöffen tzo Netfe ind Irmgarteichen", or the Jurymen at Netphen and Irmgarteichen. The Netphen symbol has its origins in the old Yule festival, in which the boar was sacrificed to the gods.

=== Town partnerships ===
- Żagań, Poland, since 1995
- Quiévy, France
- Vrchlabí, Czech Republic

== Culture and sightseeing ==
=== Museums ===
==== Heimatmuseum ====
Since 1996 there has existed in the local history museum a great exhibition room with exhibits from prehistory and early history. The focus is on the Netpherland economy with tanning, charcoal making, the Hauberg forestry system, the practice of Hude ( ≈ silvopasture) and beekeeping. The same building also houses the cultural and tourism office.

=== Buildings ===
==== Martinikirche ====
The Martini Church is a hall church from the 13th century. Beginning at dusk and into the night, the Romanesque tower is lit up.

==== Obernautalsperre ====
The Obernau Reservoir, which holds 15 000 000 m^{3} of water is the biggest drinking water reservoir in the Siegerland. A track leading all the way round the reservoir invites hikers. Towering over the reservoir is the Alte Burg, or Old Castle, a "flight castle" (one used mainly for retreat or refuge) and a place of worship from La Tène times about 500 BC. Every New Year's Eve, a Volkslauf ( ≈ fun run) is held there.

==== Wasserburg Hainchen ====
In Hainchen is found the reconstructed Wasserburg Hainchen, a moat-ringed castle.

==== Nenkersdorf Watermill ====
The mill's history goes back to the 12th century. It belonged until the 14th century to the Lords (Schlossherren) of Hainchen. At that time, the lord gave it to his tenant. Since that time, for more than five generations, the mill has been under the Weber family's ownership.

==== Walpersdorf charcoal kiln ====
Making charcoal is a tradition that goes back a long time in the Siegerland, owing mainly to another long tradition, iron smelting. In Walpersdorf is found the Siegerland's only charcoal kiln that is still used. The charcoal is made out of oak, birch and beech, yielding roughly one tonne of charcoal for every four of wood.

=== Sport ===
Netphen has a leisure park with a tennis hall, an ice stadium and an indoor swimming pool. The tennis hall and ice stadium were completed in October 1976, and on 14 May 1977 opened together with the indoor swimming pool. The outdoor swimming pool followed a short time later. Netphen's biggest sport club is the TVE.

=== Culinary specialities ===
Riewekooche, a kind of potato bread, is the local contribution to the world of food.

== Economy and infrastructure ==
=== Established businesses ===
==== AMOVA ====
The plant for AMOVA manufactures a variety of goods handling systems, for the aviation, port logistics, and metal fabrication industries.

==== Firma Walzen Irle GmbH ====
Walzen Irle GmbH is a roller manufacturer. The traditional business can look back on a 180-year history, and was the first company in Germany to make chilled cast iron rollers. Today Walzen Irle belongs to the Irle Group and is a 100% daughter company of Irle-Deuz GmbH.

==== Flender-Flux ====
Flender-Flux is a traditional business in Deuz with a 240-year history whose main business is in manufacturing metal roof systems.

==== Deuzer Maschinenfabrik Heitze GmbH & Co. ====
The firm began on 1 May 1939 as a limited partnership for the purpose of making machines and apparatuses and also pursuing trade in the same, under the name Maschinenfabrik M Heitze, Kommanditgesellschaft, and under the personally liable partner, millwrighting master Martin Heitze, the engineer Edmund Dietrich and the director Ernst Zimmermann.

By late 1939, the first works hall with a floor area of 600 m^{2} was in place, and it was equipped with 3 lathes, 1 drilling machine, 1 handheld welding site and 5 millwrighting workplaces. Machine production did not, however, begin before the war broke out that same year.

In 1939, the workforce was 6 persons. By late 1945, this had risen to 8. The first machines built at the plant were ones for woodworking, such as firewood cutting machines, carpenter's circular saws, wood drilling machines and long band saws. This production stopped in 1945 after more than 200 machines had been completed.

When Mr. Honig joined the firm after the Second World War as a constructing engineer, and later a shareholder, his connection to his former employer, the Waldrich firm in Siegen, led to the company's beginning production, with the Eugen Waldrich firm in Bad Godesberg, of glass pane finishing machines late in 1945.

The programme was based on folding-arm polishing machines, combination grinding and polishing machines, horizontal grinding machines, glass drilling machines and groove cutting machines. Production continued until 1965, shutting down only slowly after having fulfilled the glass industry's backlog.

==== Bombardier Transportation ====
In Netphen lies a Bombardier Transportation works at which bogies are made.

=== Transport ===
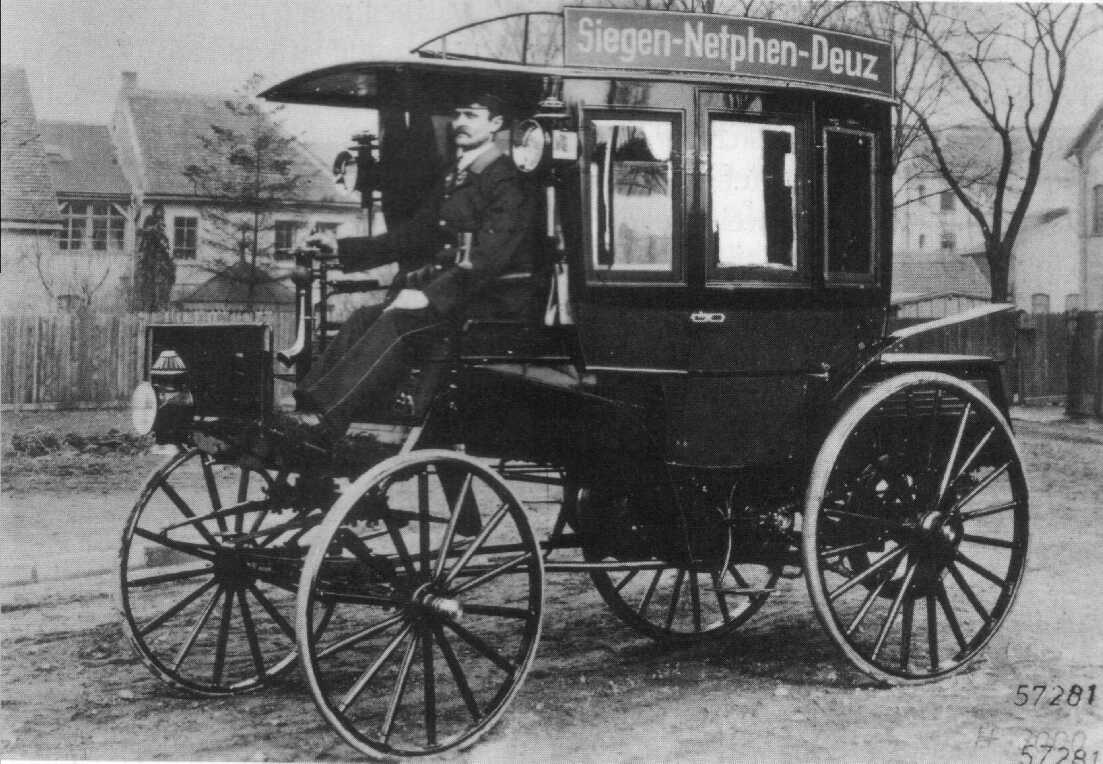
The world's first petrol-powered bus on the world's first busline. The destinations are clearly mounted on the display board at the cantrail.

The main road to the town is Federal Highway (Bundesstraße) B 62, crossing the municipal area from southwest to northeast. At Dreis-Tiefenbach is an interchange with the Siegen municipal Autobahn (Hüttentalstraße).

For goods transport, there was once a railway line that ran from Irmgarteichen to Siegen-Weidenau. It was abandoned in 2004, except for works runs between Walzen Irle's works.

A short stretch of the Rothaarbahn railway cuts across the municipal area in the northeast, but there is no stop.

The world's first motorised bus route ran through the town, operated by the Netphener Omnibus-Gesellschaft as Siegen-Netphen-Deuz. It opened on 18 March 1895 with one bus powered by a single-cylinder petrol engine supplied by Benz & Cie. Local passenger transport now is supplied by Verkehrsgemeinschaft Westfalen-Süd (VGWS)(South Westphalia Transport Community) bus routes.

The town is connected to regional air travel through the Siegerland Airport in Burbach, southwest of Netphen.

== Notable people ==
- Paul Scheuerpflug (1896–1945), German officer, most recently Generalleutnant in the Second World War
- Klaus-Peter Thaler (born 1949), cyclist
