= Igreja de São Martinho de Mouros =

Church building in Resende, Viseu District, Portugal

Coordinates: 41.101859°N 7.9008899°W

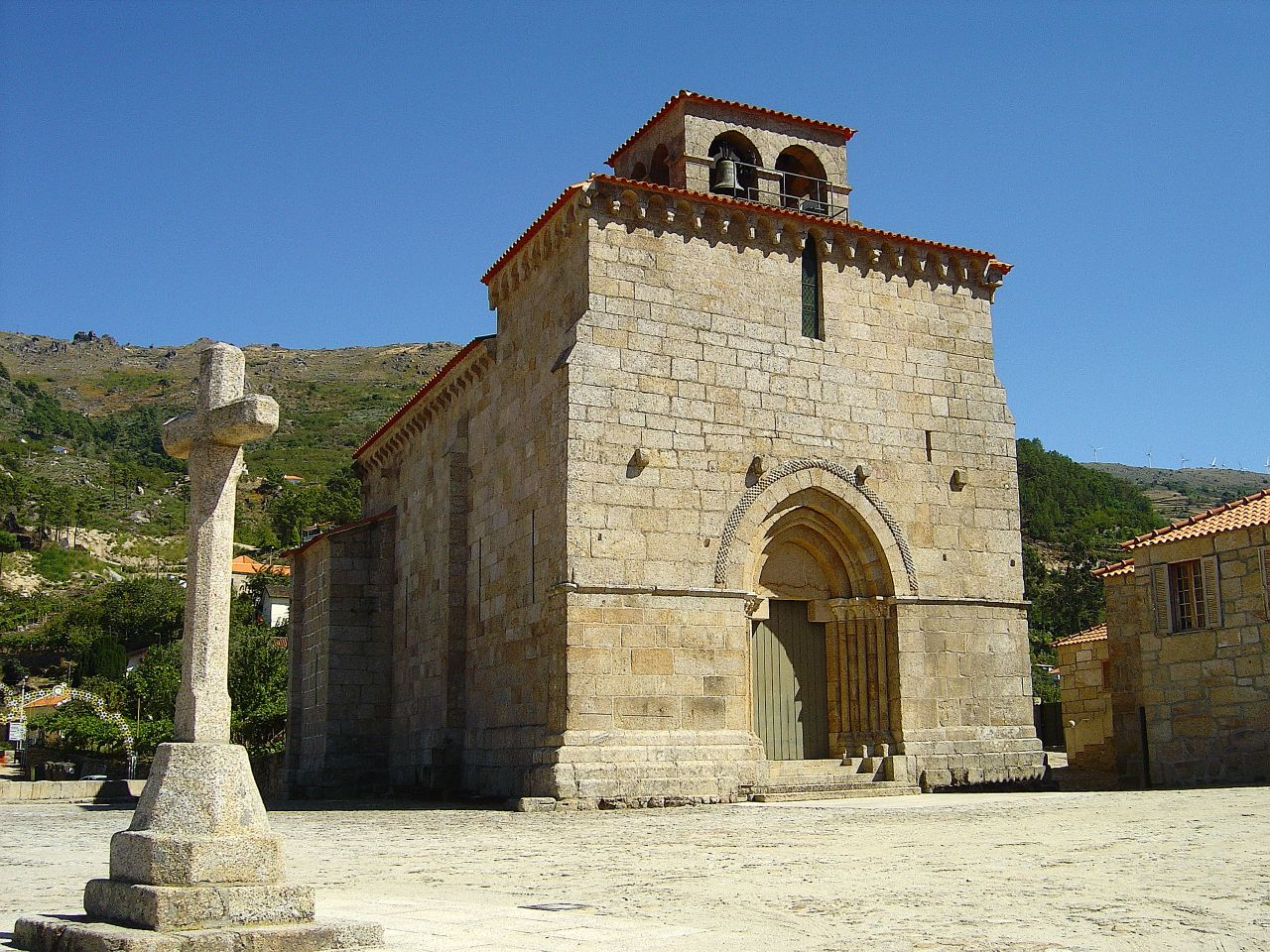

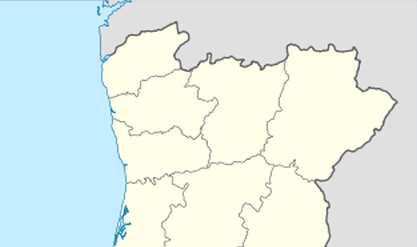
- Address: R. da Calçada, Portugal
- Denomination: Catholic

Igreja de São Martinho de Mouros is a church in Portugal. It is classified as a National Monument.
