= Buxières-les-Mines =

Commune in Auvergne-Rhône-Alpes, France

- Commune
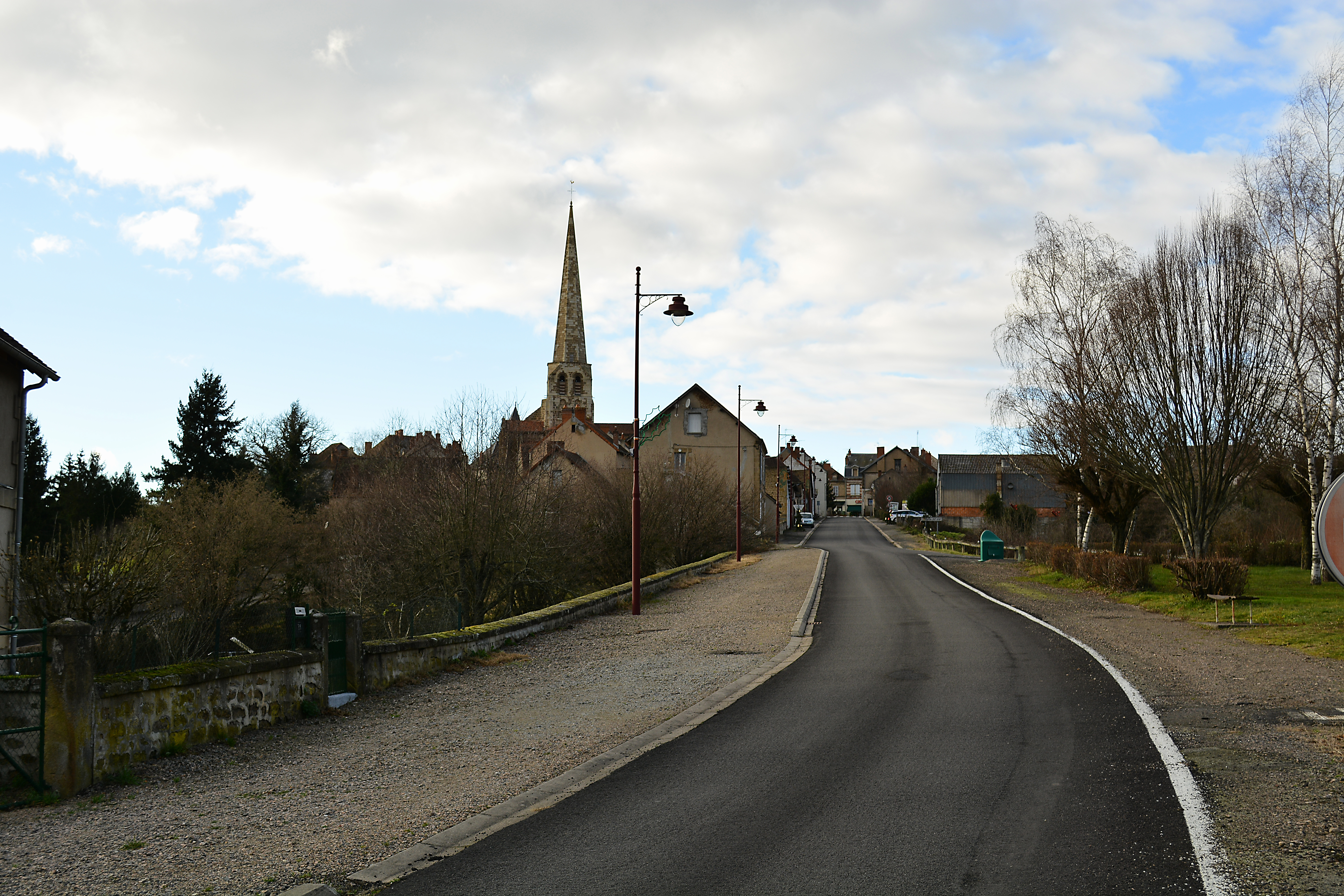
- The road into Buxières-les-Mines
- Location of Buxières-les-Mines
- Location within France Location within Auvergne-Rhône-Alpes
- Coordinates: 46°28′08″N 2°57′38″E
- Country: France
- Region: Auvergne-Rhône-Alpes
- Department: Allier
- Arrondissement: Moulins
- Canton: Bourbon-l'Archambault
- Intercommunality: Bocage Bourbonnais

Government
  - Mayor (2026–32): Brigitte Olivier
- Area^{1}: 46.95 km^{2} (18.13 sq mi)
- Elevation: 290 m (950 ft)
- Highest elevation: 391 m (1,283 ft)
- Lowest elevation: 239 m (784 ft)
- Population (2023): 994
  - Density: 21.2/km^{2} (54.8/sq mi)
- Time zone: UTC+01:00 (CET)
  - Summer (DST): UTC+02:00 (CEST)
- INSEE/Postal code: 03046 /03440
- ^{1} French Land Register data, which excludes lakes, ponds, glaciers > 1 km^{2} (0.386 sq mi or 247 acres) and river estuaries.

Buxières-les-Mines (French pronunciation: [byksjɛʁ le min]) is a commune in the Allier department in central France.

== Population ==
Historical population
Year	Pop.	±% p.a.
1968	1,661	—
1975	1,379	−2.62%
1982	1,380	+0.01%
1990	1,241	−1.32%
1999	1,180	−0.56%
2007	1,079	−1.11%
2012	1,050	−0.54%
2017	1,058	+0.15%
2023	994	−1.03%
Source: INSEE

== Transport ==
Until 1972, Buxières-les-Mines was served by the nearby Chavenon station, which was used to transport coal produced in the mine.

== Personalities ==
- Louis Ganne, composer and conductor, was born in Buxières-les-Mines.

== See also ==
- Communes of the Allier department
