= St Martin's Chapel, Baħrija =

St Martin's Chapel
- Kappella ta' San Martin ta' Tours
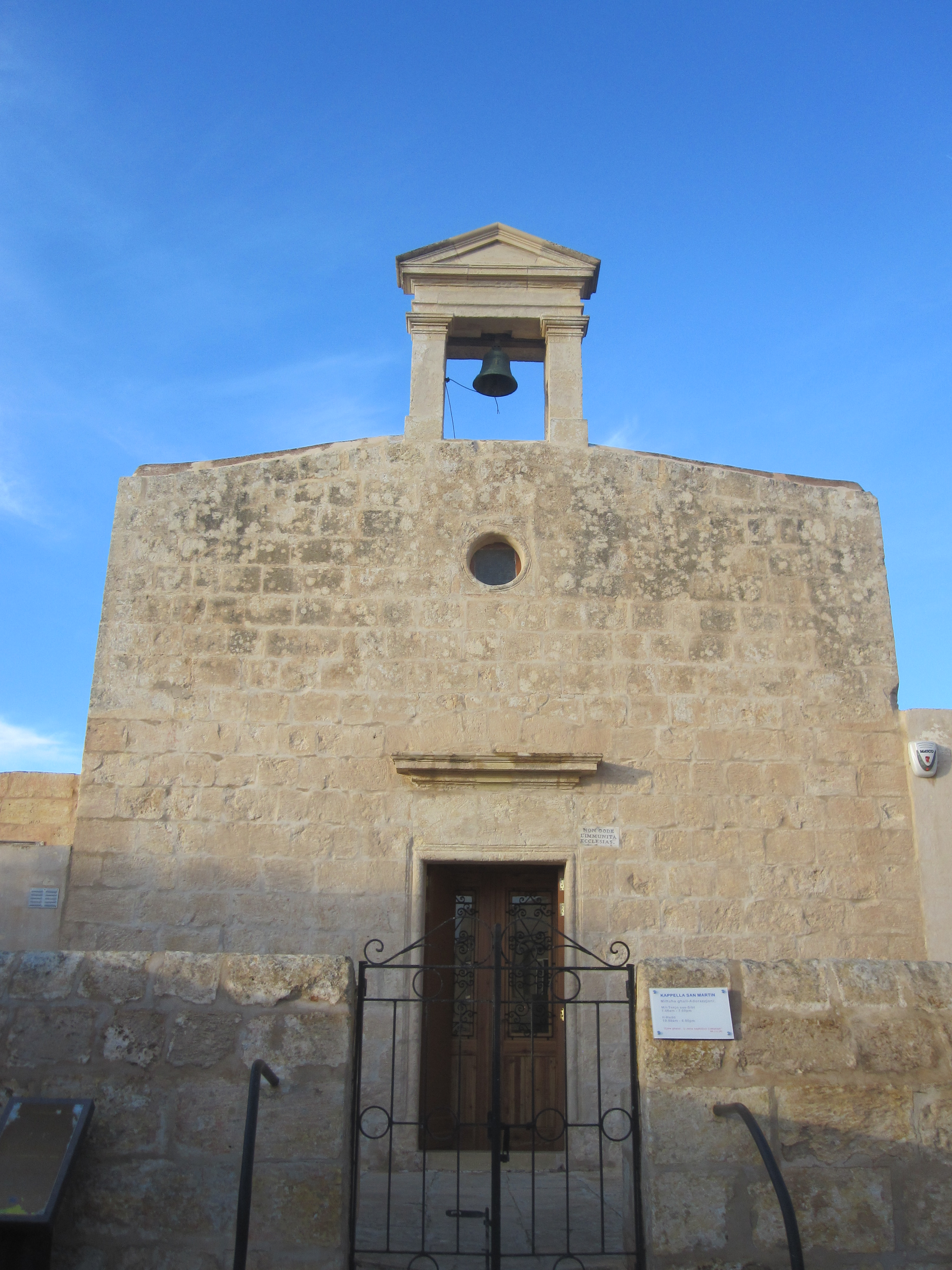

- Location within Malta
- 35°53′45.0″N 14°20′48.7″E
- Location: Baħrija
- Country: Malta
- Denomination: Roman Catholic

History
- Status: Active
- Founded: 15th century
- Dedication: Martin of Tours

Architecture
- Functional status: Church
- Completed: 17th century

Administration
- Archdiocese: Malta
- Parish: St Paul's Rabat

Clergy
- Archbishop: Charles Scicluna

The Chapel of St Martin is a small Roman Catholic church in the rural village of Baħrija in Malta.

== History ==
The original chapel was founded in the 15th century. It was mentioned in 1575 in inquisitor Pietro Dusina's report of his apostolic visit to Malta. Dusina mentions that the church lacked all means to use for the celebration of mass and that mass was only celebrated once a year. Dusina ordered the restoration of the chapel's door and ordered the parish priest of St Paul's Collegiate church in Rabat to encourage locals to care for the chapel. Years later, when Bishop Baldassare Cagliares visited the chapel in 1615 he found that Dusina's instructions were ignored and consequently deconsecrated the chapel.

Interior of the Chapel

In 1643, agreements were drawn to celebrate vespers on the eve of the feast of St Martin and mass on the feast day. In 1684, Bishop Miguel Jerónimo de Molina visited the chapel and mentions that mass was celebrated on Sundays and feast days. Around the same year the chapel was rebuilt through initiatives of Cumbo Navarra.

The chapel was used frequently by the locals until a new larger church was built nearby. The chapel was recently extensively restored and is mostly used for perpetual adoration.

== Interior ==
The chapel includes one altar and a painting depicting Martin of Tours, St James the Greater and St Philip Neri. It dates from 1735 and is the work of Francesco Zahra.
