= St. Martin's Chapel, Furtwangen =

Historic building in Germany

Coordinates: 48°05′46.1″N 8°09′20.1″E

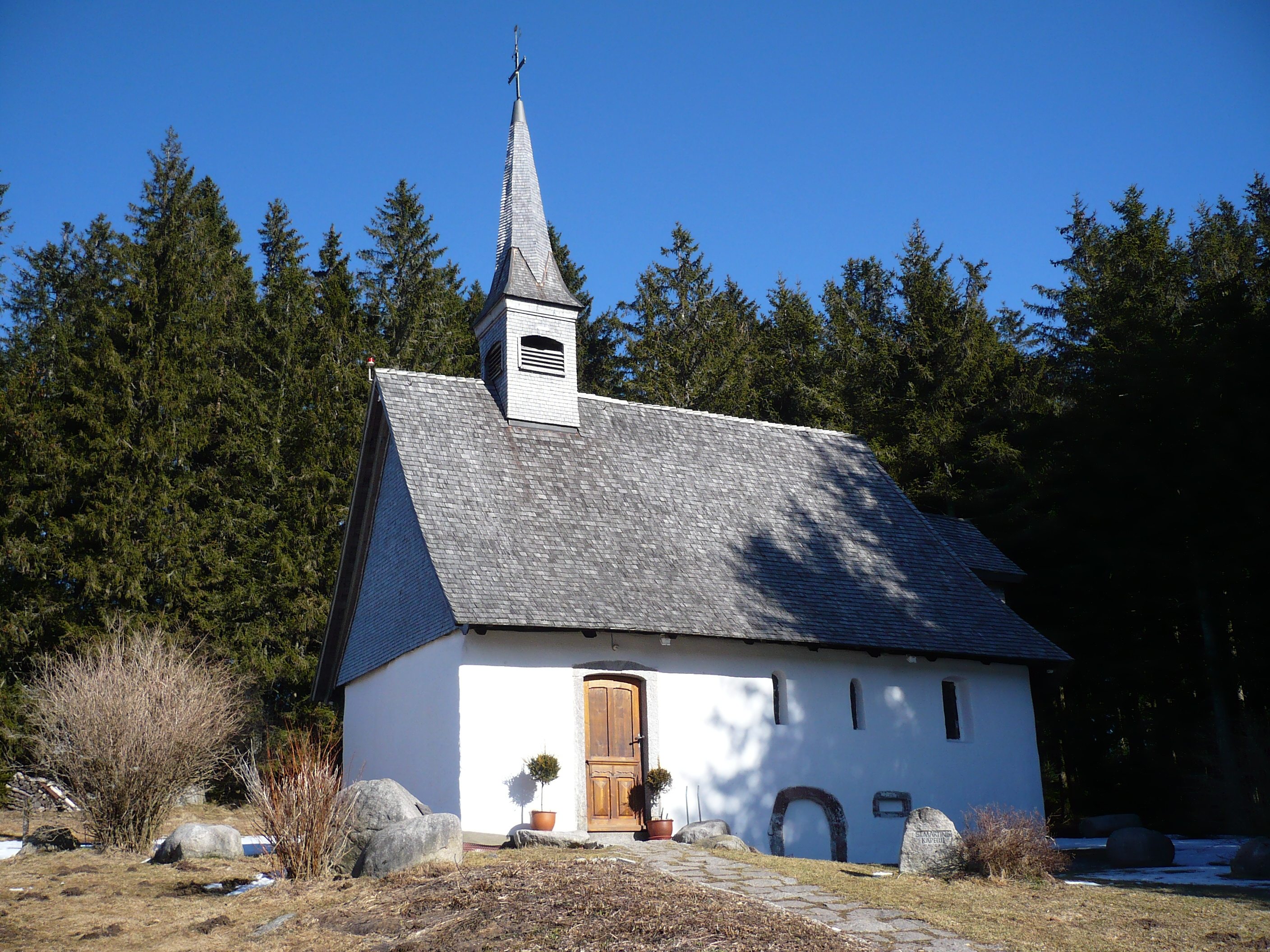
St. Martin’s Chapel

St. Martin’s Chapel (German: Martinskapelle) stands at an elevation of 1,085 metres above sea level (NHN) at the upper end of the Katzensteig valley on the territory of Furtwangen just above the source of the Danube. It is also not far from the source of the River Elz and thus the main European watershed between the Rhine and the Danube. The West Way, a major hiking trail in the Black Forest runs past the chapel as does the long-distance ski trail from Schonach to Belchen.

== Original chapel ==
St. Martin’s Chapel stands above an old mountain pass that may have even existed in the La Tène period (5th–1st centuries B.C.). If that was the case, the chapel represents a link between Celtic and early Christian culture in this region. Archaeological excavations in 1958 showed that, on the site of the present chapel, there was a religious building as early as the time around 800 A.D. perhaps a heathen spring shrine. The same investigations uncovered a basin that, if this was in fact a religious building, could have been a font.

From the exposed foundations, the appearance of this first building was able to be reconstructed. It consisted of a sacred space, 4.20 by 4.20 metres in area, and an attached baptismal room with two windows. According to the report of the 1958 restoration, this layout is similar to that of St. Wendelin’s Chapel (600 A.D.) in Cazis in the Swiss canton of Graubünden.

In historical documents, the elevation of a forest chapel to the status of a church by the abbey of St. Margaret is recorded in 915, but it is not clear if that refers to this earliest building. It could also refer to a chapel, recorded in a papal bull of 1178 by Pope Alexander III, that was erected on a high mountain by the municipality of Furtwangen.

== Medieval chapel ==
In the Middle Ages a new chapel was built using the old foundations and possibly parts of the outer walls. This probably dates to the Late Gothic period. After the chapel had been partially destroyed during the Thirty Years' War, a new roof and a new ceiling were built. The centre part of this has survived and bears the date 1672.

In the chapel there are other dates, some of which, thanks to the restoration work (Haas 1997) have been able to be correctly attributed: the retable dates to the year 1705, and the date of 1905 above the door lintel indicates the restoration measures of that time. The date of 1460 that was painted on the retable until the 1995-97 restoration was classified as incorrect.

== Temporary use of the chapel ==
Since the beginning of the 19th century, the chapel has been owned by the Kolmen farm. However, in 1848 it was converted into a utility building: extensions and alterations were made so that it had a stable, hayloft, shed, toilet and cellar. Even the tower was replaced by a chimney.

The appearance of the present chapel dates back to an account that, in 1900, the Kolmenhof farmer made a vow that he would honour God and reinstate the former chapel as a place of worship if God would free him and his family from economic hardship. He appears to have been heard because, in 1905-06, the chapel was largely returned to its original state, a turret being replaced in its original position. In 1906 the chapel was rededicated.

== Restoration measures and archaeological excavations ==
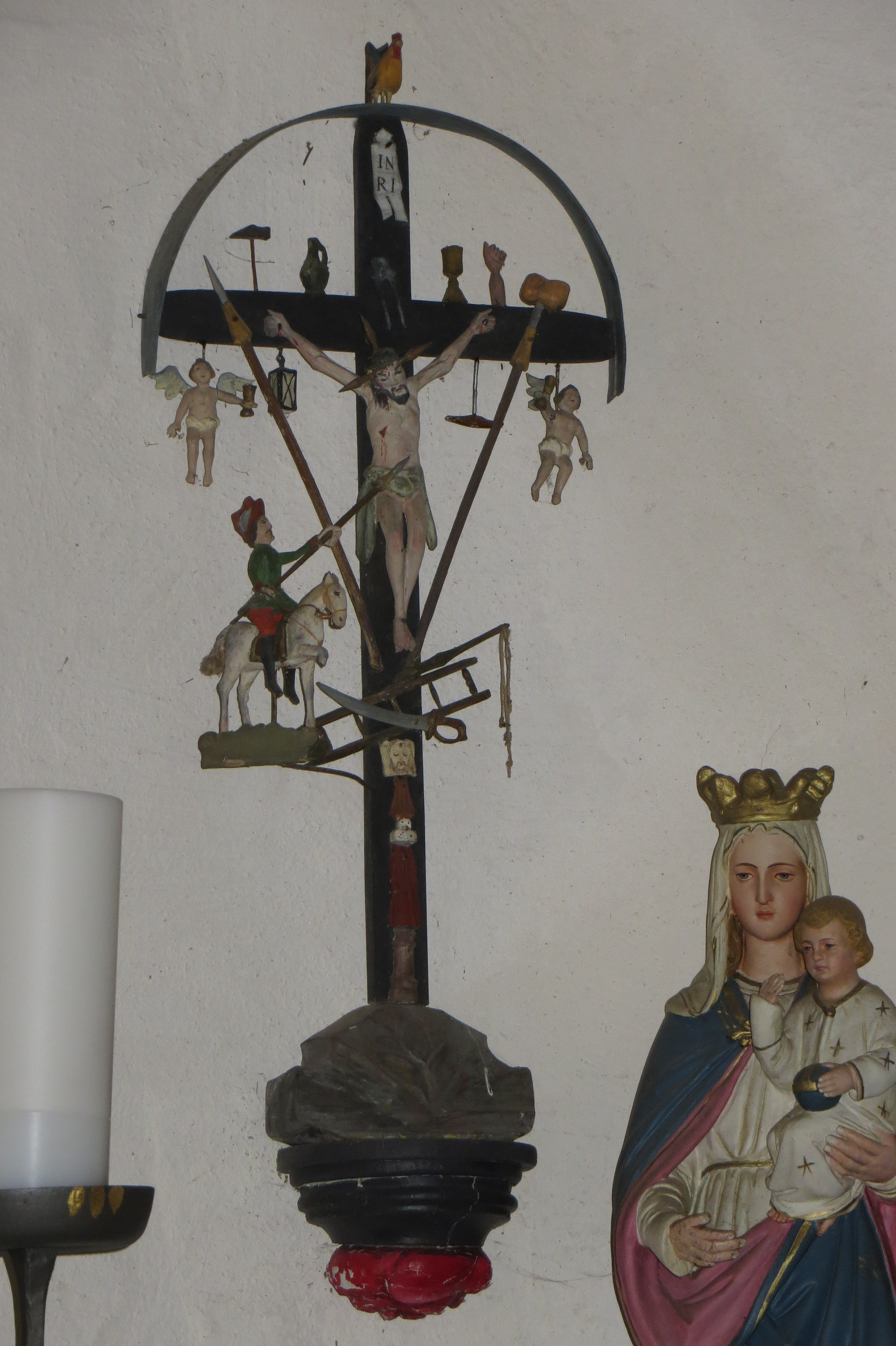
The Longinus cross inside the chapel

In 1958, the first comprehensive restoration measures, together with archaeological investigations, took place (under Schmidt). The remains of the utility building were moved, including the cement plaster and debris in the basement. The altarpiece was redesigned to a Baroque style, after it had been painted over in 1920 with oils. To do this marbling and gilding were used. Another comprehensive restoration of the building (under Bürk) and plasterwork investigations (under Jung) took place 1995-1997. This saw inter alia the roof covered with hand-split spruce shingles, ventilation and alarm facilities installed, the walls replastered and the pews restored. The interior of the chapel (altarpiece, retable, Gothic sculptures, processional, etc.) has been restored in keeping with its previous appearance. The outdoor area with its exposed foundations and boulders, as it is today, dates from this period.

== Gallery ==
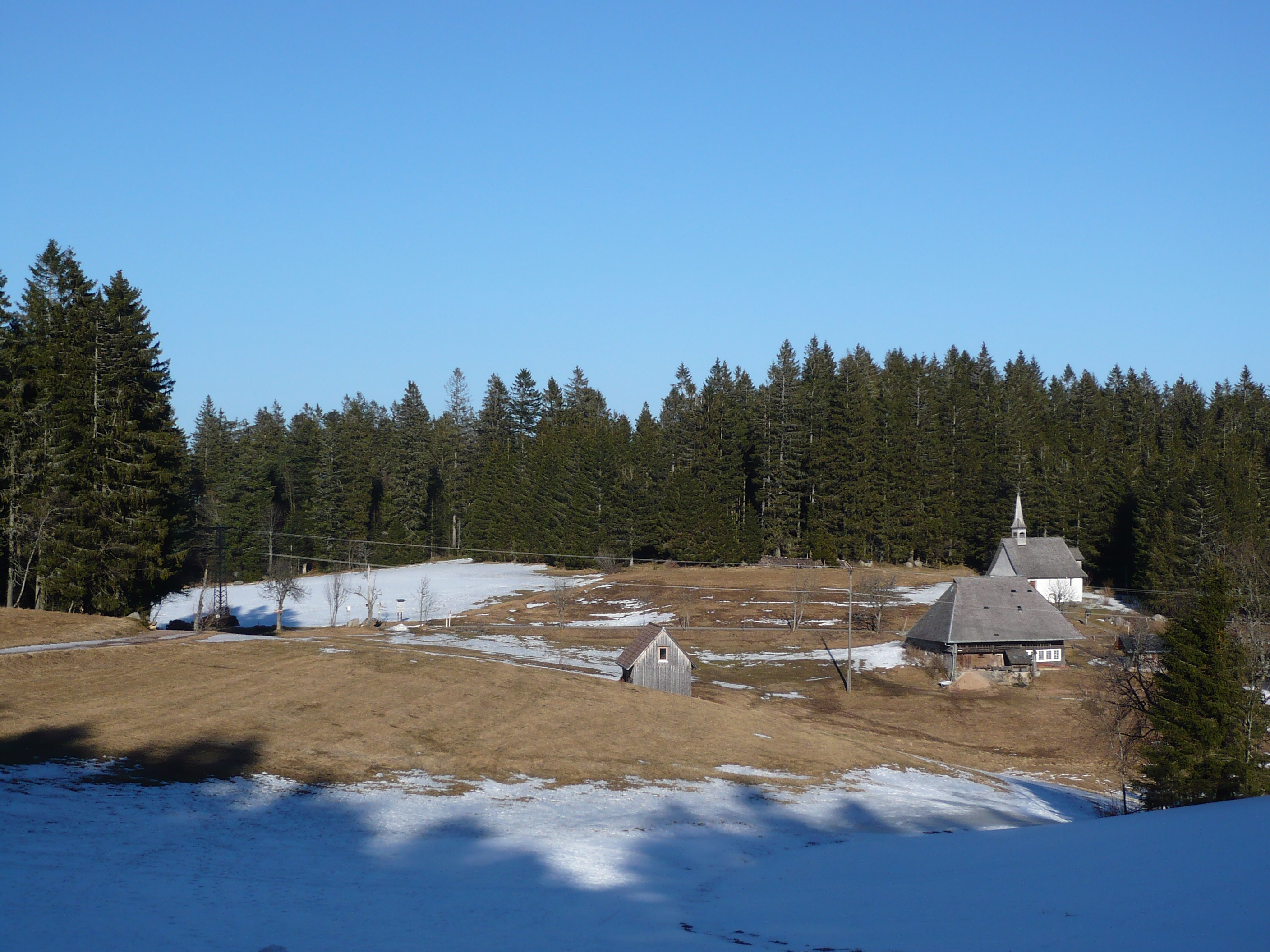
View of St. Martin's Chapel and part of the Kolmenhof farm, looking north
