= San Martino =

San Martino may refer to:

- Saint Martin (disambiguation), a number of saints

== Places ==
=== Italy ===
==== Towns ====
- Adrara San Martino, a comune in Bergamo province, Lombardy
- Borgo San Martino, a comune in Alessandria province, Piedmont
- Campo San Martino, a comune in Padua province, Veneto
- Cazzago San Martino, a comune in Brescia province, Lombardy
- Fara San Martino, a comune in Chieti province, Abruzzo
- Monte San Martino, a comune in Macerata province, Marche
- San Martino Agelli, a village in Sant'Anatolia di Narco, Perugia province, Umbria
- San Martino Alfieri, a comune in Asti province, Piedmont
- San Martino al Cimino, a borough of Viterbo, Lazio
- San Martino al Tagliamento, a comune in Pordenone province, Friuli-Venezia Giulia
- San Martino Buon Albergo, a comune in Verona province, Veneto
- San Martino Canavese, a comune in Turin province, Piedmont
- San Martino d'Agri, a comune in Potenza province, Basilicata
- San Martino dall'Argine, a comune in Mantua province, Lombardy
- San Martino del Lago, a comune in Cremona province, Lombardy
- San Martino di Finita, a comune in Cosenza province, Calabria
- San Martino di Lupari, a comune in Padua province, Veneto
- San Martino di Taurianova, a frazione of the comune of Taurianova, in Reggio Calabria
- San Martino di Venezze, a comune in Rovigo province, Veneto
- San Martino in Pensilis, a comune in Campobasso province, Molise
- San Martino in Rio, a comune in Reggio Emilia province, Emilia-Romagna
- San Martino in Strada, a comune in Lodi province, Lombardy
- San Martino Sannita, a comune in Benevento province, Campania
- San Martino Siccomario, a comune in Pavia province, Lombardy
- San Martino sulla Marrucina, a comune in Chieti province, Abruzzo
- San Martino Valle Caudina, a comune in Avellino province, Campania
- Vigano San Martino, a comune in Bergamo province, Lombardy

==== Other places in Italy ====
- Monte San Martino (Lecco), a mountain of Lombardy, in the Bergamo Alps
- San Martino di Castrozza, a ski resort in Trento province, Trentino-Alto Adige/Südtirol

=== France ===
- San-Martino-di-Lota, a commune in the Haute-Corse department on the island of Corsica

=== Spain ===
- San Martiño, an island off the north coast of Spain
- San Martiño (Cíes Islands), an island off the west coast of Spain

== Churches ==
=== Italy ===
- Certosa di San Martino, a charterhouse, or monastery complex in Naples
- San Martino ai Monti, a basilica church in Rome
- San Martino del Vescovo, a parish church in central Florence
- San Martino, Erice, a confraternity church in Erice, Sicily
- San Martino, Riccione, a church in Riccione, province of Rimini
- San Martino (Siena), a church in Siena
- San Martino, Venice, a church near the Arsenale in Venice

== People ==
- Ettore Perrone di San Martino (1789-1849), Italian politician and military leader
- Gustavo Ponza di San Martino (1810-1876), Italian politician
- Coriolano Ponza di San Martino (1842-1926) Italian Minister of War
- Master of San Martino alla Palma, Florentine painter active during the first third of the 14th century

== Other ==
- Battle of San Martino (1482), a battle between Venetians and Florentines
- Battle of Solferino, an 1859 battle also sometimes known as the Battle of San Martino

== See also ==
- St. Martin's (disambiguation)
- San Martín (disambiguation)
- Sankt Martin (disambiguation)
- São Martinho (disambiguation)
