= Martin I =

Martin I may refer to:

- Pope Martin I (c. 590/600–655), bishop of Rome 649–655
- Martin I (bishop of Oviedo) (died 1101)
- Martin I (archbishop of Gniezno) (died after 1112)
- Martin I of Aragon (1356–1410)
- Martin I of Sicily (1374/6–1409)
- Martin, Count of Ribagorza (r. 1533–1565 and 1573–1581), see County of Ribagorza

== See also ==
- Saint Martin (disambiguation)
- San Martín (disambiguation)
- Martin II (disambiguation)
