= San Martín =

San Martín or San Martin may refer to:

== People ==
=== Saints ===
- Saint Martin, name of various saints in Spanish

=== Political leaders ===
- Vicente San Martín (1839–1901), Military, national hero of Mexico.
- Basilio San Martín (1849–1905), Military, Commander of the Fortress of San Juan De Ulua, Veracruz, Mexico
- José de San Martín (1778–1850), national hero of Argentina, a 19th-century general and the main leader of the southern part of South America's struggle for independence from Spain
- Manuel San Martín (1881–1965), Military, Mexican Revolution
- Joaquín de San Martín (1770–1854), President of El Salvador
- José María San Martín (1811–1857), President of El Salvador
- Ramón Grau San Martín (1881–1969), doctor and twice President of Cuba
- Alejandro Zorrilla de San Martín (1909–1987), Uruguayan political figure

=== Sportspeople ===
- Andrés San Martín (born 1978), Argentine footballer
- Carlos Aníbal San Martín (born 1971), Argentine footballer
- Horacio San Martín (born 1982), Argentine rugby footballer
- Nelson San Martín (born 1980), Chilean footballer
- Sylvia Iannuzzi-San Martín (born 1947), Argentine fencer

=== Others ===
- Fray Thomas de San Martín (1482–1555), founder of the National University of San Marcos in Lima, Peru
- Juan Zorrilla de San Martín (1855–1931), Uruguayan epic poet

== Places ==
=== Argentina ===
- General San Martín Partido
  - San Martín, Buenos Aires
- San Martín, Catamarca
- San Martín Department, Corrientes
- San Martín Department, Mendoza
  - San Martín, Mendoza
- San Martín Department, San Juan
- San Martín Department, Santiago del Estero
- San Martín Department, Santa Fe
- San Martín de los Andes
- General San Martín Department, La Rioja
- General San Martín Department, Salta
- Libertador General San Martín Department, Misiones
- Libertador General San Martín Department, Chaco
- Libertador General San Martín Department, San Luis
- Parque San Martín, Buenos Aires Province a city located in Merlo, Buenos Aires Province

=== Colombia ===
- San Martín, Meta
- San Martín, Cesar
- San Martín Territory

=== El Salvador ===
- San Martín, San Salvador

=== Malta ===
- San Martin, St. Paul's Bay
- Ġebel San Martin, Żejtun

=== Mexico ===
- San Martín Chalchicuautla, San Luis Potosí
- San Martín de Bolaños, Jalisco
- San Martín de Hidalgo, Jalisco
- San Martín de las Pirámides, State of Mexico
- San Martín de los Cansecos, Oaxaca
- San Martín Huamelulpam, Oaxaca
- San Martín Itunyoso, Oaxaca
- San Martín Lachilá, Oaxaca
- San Martín Peras, Oaxaca
- San Martín Tilcajete, Oaxaca
- San Martín Toxpalan, Oaxaca
- San Martín Zacatepec, Oaxaca
- San Martín Texmelucan, Puebla
- San Martín Totoltepec, Puebla

=== Panama ===
- San Martín, Panama

=== Peru ===
- Department of San Martín, also known as San Martín Region
- San Martín Province, in San Martín Region
- San Martín District, in El Dorado Province, San Martín Region
- San Martín de Porres District, in Lima Province, Lima Region

=== Spain ===
- San Martín de Unx, Navarre
- San Martín de Valdeiglesias, Madrid
- San Martín del Río, a town in the province of Teruel, Aragón
- San Martín del Tesorillo, Andalusia
- San Martín (Proaza), a parish of Proaza, Asturias

=== United States ===
- San Martin, California, a census-designated place and an unincorporated town

=== Antarctica ===
- San Martín Base

== Infrastructure ==
- San Martin (1580), a Portuguese Navy galleon
- San Martín metro station, a Lima Metro station
- San Martín station (Mendoza), a Sociedad de Transporte Mendoza light rail station in Argentina
- San Martín (Mexibús), a BRT station in Ecatepec de Morelos, Mexico
- San Martín (TransMilenio), a bus station in Bogotá, Colombia
- Línea San Martín (Buenos Aires), an Argentine commuter rail line

== Football ==
- Club Atlético San Martín de Tucumán, 3rd tier football club from Argentina (2011)
- Club Atlético San Martín de San Juan, 1st tier football club from Argentina (2011)
- San Martín de Mendoza, 4th tier football club from Argentina (2011)
- San Martín de Burzaco, 5th tier football club from Argentina (2011)
- Universidad San Martín de Porres, 1st tier football club from Peru
- San Martín de Porres de Pucallpa, a Peruvian football club, playing in the city of Pucallpa

== Fiction ==
- San Martín: El Cruce de los Andes, 2010 movie about José de San Martín

== See also ==
- General José de San Martín (disambiguation)
- St. Martin (disambiguation)
- Sânmartin (disambiguation)
- Sint Maarten (disambiguation)
