= Sint Maarten (disambiguation) =

Sint Maarten is a constituent country of the Kingdom of the Netherlands.

Sint Maarten, Sint-Maarten or Sint Martinus may also refer to:

- Sint Maarten, North Holland, a village in the Netherlands
- Saint Martin (island) (Dutch: Sint Maarten), an island in the Caribbean
- Martin of Tours (Dutch: Sint-Maarten), French saint
- St. Martin's Day (Dutch: Sint-Maarten), a holiday celebrated in Belgium and the Netherlands
- Sint Martinus, Didam, a tower mill in the Netherlands
- Sint-Maartenscollege, a school in Maastricht, Netherlands
- AZ Sint-Maarten, a hospital in Mechelen, Belgium

== See also ==
- Saint Martin (disambiguation)
- San Martín (disambiguation)
- Sankt Martin (disambiguation)
- São Martinho (disambiguation)
