= Sânmărtean =

Sânmărtean is a surname. Notable people with the surname include:

- Lucian Sânmărtean (born 1980), Romanian footballer
- Dinu Sânmărtean (born 1981), Romanian footballer, brother of Lucian

== See also ==
- Sânmartin (disambiguation)
