= Fiasco (bottle) =

Italian style of bottle wrapped in straw

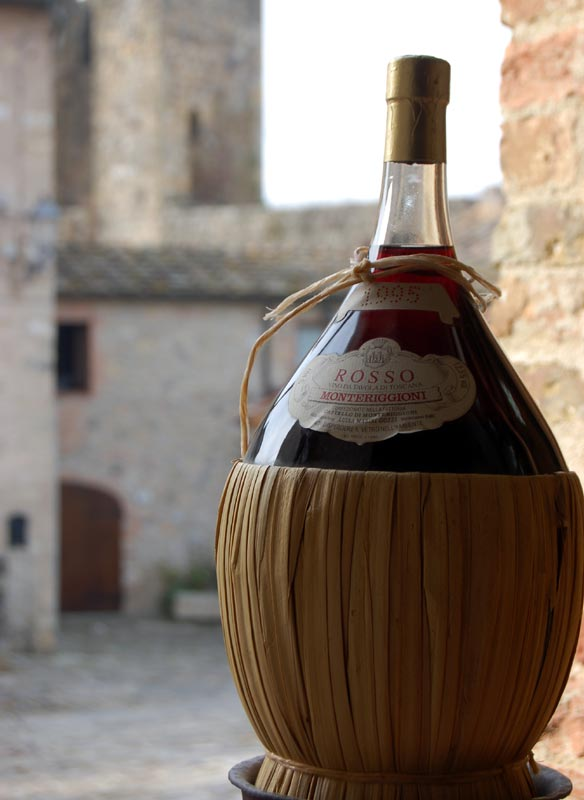
Bottle of the Italian wine Chianti in the traditional fiasco basket

A fiasco (/fiˈæskoʊ/, Italian: [ˈfjasko]; pl.: fiaschi) is a traditional Italian style of bottle, usually with a round body and bottom, partially or completely covered with a close-fitting straw basket. The basket is typically made of sala, a swamp weed, sun-dried and blanched with sulfur. The basket provides protection during transportation and handling, and also a flat base for the container. Thus the glass bottle can have a round bottom, which is much simpler to make by glassblowing. Fiaschi can be efficiently packed for transport, with the necks of inverted bottles safely tucked into the spaces between the baskets of upright ones.

== History ==
Glazed terracotta flask dating back to the New Kingdom of Egypt. Museo Egizio, Turin.

The word fiasco is Tuscan. Boccaccio mentions the fiasco in the Decameron (around 1350), as a receptacle for red wine and administrative documents of the time mention the profession of fiascaio ('fiasco-maker'). Common fiasco sizes of the time were the quarto ('quarter', 5.7 liters), mezzo quarto ('half quarter', 2.28 liters), and metadella ('small half', 1.4 liters).

It is not known, however, when the straw covering was introduced. A 14th century painting by Tommaso da Modena shows a small rounded fiasco, completely wrapped with cords of some type. Other artistic depictions were provided by Botticelli (Banchetto per Nastagio degli Onesti) and Ghirlandaio (Buonomini di San Martino and The Birth of John the Baptist). The earliest fragments of sala-covered bottles date from the 15th century.

Throughout its history, the fiasco was found on the tables of peasants and popes alike. A decree from 1574 by the Grand Duke of Tuscany fixed the capacity of the mezzo quarto bottle, and established a public office that would certify the capacity of fiaschi by a lead seal applied to the straw covering. However, producers soon started re-using the baskets from discarded certified fiaschi to dress new sub-standard bottles. To avoid this common fraud, another decree from 1618 specified that the seal was to be applied to the glass bottle itself. In 1621, yet another decree mandated sealing the bottle's mouth with molten lead. For this reason, the straw cover had to be reduced, leaving the bottle bare from the "shoulder" up—an arrangement that persists to this day.

By the early 20th century, the manufacture of fiaschi employed about 1,000 glass blowers and 30,000 basket weavers. A manufacturer's association (Comissionaria Industria Fiaschi) was established at Empoli in 1933. Starting in the 1950s the manufacture of bottles and baskets was increasingly automated.

At the same time, the Bordeaux-style bottle (bordolese) was becoming more popular among wine producers, displacing the fiasco. However, a 1965 law reserved the fiasco for wines of legally controlled denomination (denominazione di origine controllata; DOC), restoring the prestige of that classical container. The fiasco is no longer commonly used in Italy for storing and selling wine, and its more common uses nowadays are as a souvenir for tourists or as a decorative item in restaurants and kitchens.

== Basket features ==
The straw bands can be vertical or horizontal; the former was traditionally used for fiaschi destined to local markets, while the latter, with a reinforced base and more careful weaving, was chiefly used for export. The latter often used a basket of whitened straw, decorated with two stripes tinted in the Italian flag colors (red and green). The base is a torus made of scrap straw, tied with fine straw blades (salicchio). Centuries ago, the basket often included one or more handles of twisted straw; they are sometimes included in present-day fiaschi, often for decorative purposes only.

== Gallery ==
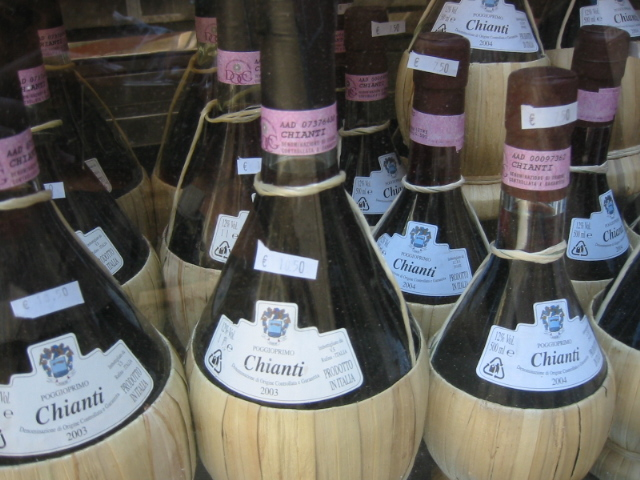
Fiaschi of Chianti

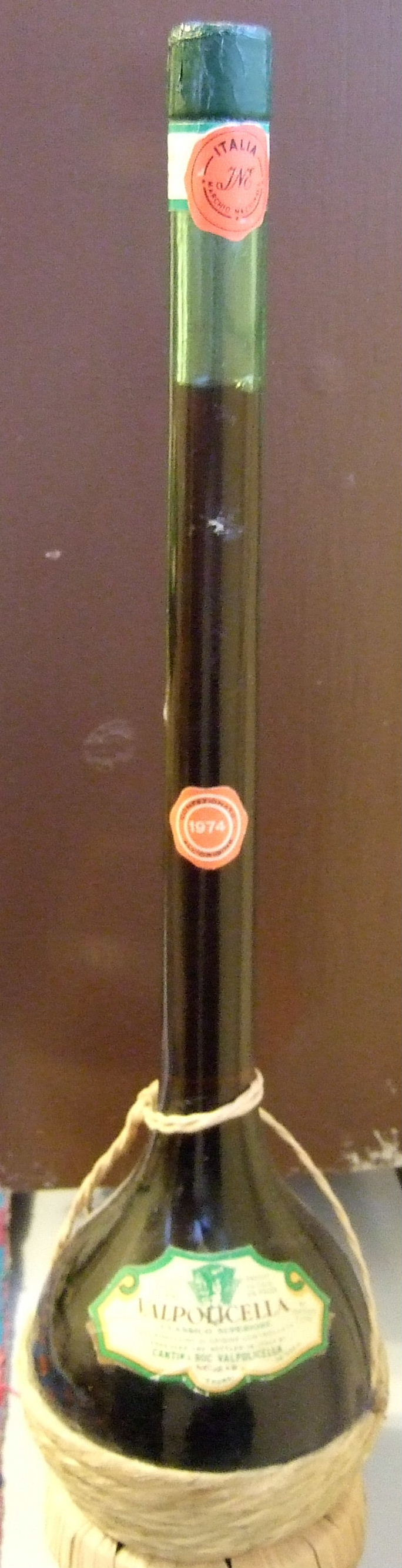
Valpolicella

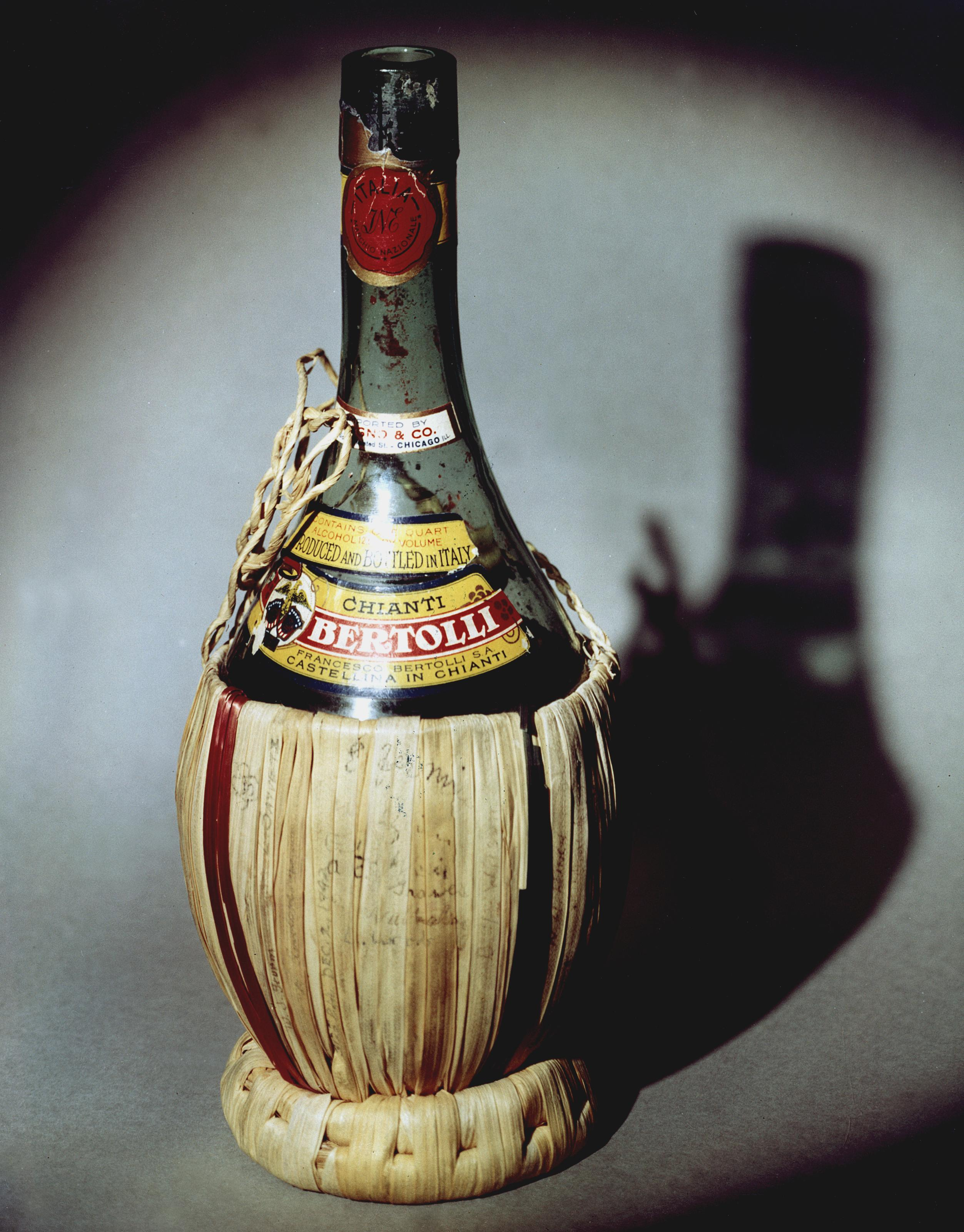
The Chianti fiasco used to celebrate the first self-sustaining, controlled nuclear chain reaction at the Chicago Pile-1 in 1942
