= Ejutla District =

- District
- Oaxaca regions and districts: Valles Centrales in the center
- Coordinates: 16°34′N 96°43′W
- Country: Mexico
- State: Oaxaca

Population (2020)
  - Total: 49,863

Ejutla District is located in the south of the Valles Centrales Region of the State of Oaxaca, Mexico.

== Municipalities ==
The district includes the following municipalities:

Municipality code	Name	Population		Land Area			Population density	
Municipality code	Name	2020	Rank	km^{2}	sq mi	Rank	2020	Rank
015	Coatecas Altas	5,356	2	119.4	46.1	2	45/km^{2} (116/sq mi)	8
028	Ejutla de Crespo	23,148	1	317.5	122.6	1	73/km^{2} (189/sq mi)	7
017	La Compañía	3,607	3	104.2	40.2	5	35/km^{2} (90/sq mi)	9
069	La Pe	3,052	6	26.89	10.38	8	113/km^{2} (294/sq mi)	2
080	San Agustín Amatengo	1,593	7	55.59	21.46	7	29/km^{2} (74/sq mi)	12
101	San Andrés Zabache	748	13	7.060	2.726	13	106/km^{2} (274/sq mi)	4
203	San Juan Lachigalla	3,538	4	107.4	41.5	3	33/km^{2} (85/sq mi)	11
238	San Martín de los Cansecos	994	11	8.311	3.209	12	120/km^{2} (310/sq mi)	1
241	San Martín Lachilá	1,034	10	10.34	3.99	11	100/km^{2} (259/sq mi)	5
268	San Miguel Ejutla	1,149	9	10.75	4.15	10	107/km^{2} (277/sq mi)	3
534	San Vicente Coatlán	3,512	5	106	41	4	33/km^{2} (86/sq mi)	10
542	Taniche	887	12	10.76	4.15	9	82/km^{2} (214/sq mi)	6
563	Yogana	1,245	8	65.69	25.36	6	19/km^{2} (49/sq mi)	13
	Distrito Ejutla	49,863	—	950	366.80	—	52/km^{2} (136/sq mi)	—
Source: INEGI

=== Largest cities ===
Largest cities or towns in Ejutla Distric Source:
Rank		Municipality	Pop.
1	Ejutla de Crespo	Ejutla de Crespo	11,168
2	Coatecas Altas	Coatecas Altas	3,192
3	San Vicente Coatlán	San Vicente Coatlán	3,165
4	La Pe	La Pe	2,527
5	Santa Marta Chichihualtepec	Ejutla de Crespo	1,581
6	San Agustín Amatengo	San Agustín Amatengo	1,577
7	Yogana	Yogana	1,217
8	Agua del Espino	La Compañía	1,197
9	San Martín Lachilá	San Martín Lachilá	1,034
10	San Miguel Ejutla	San Miguel Ejutla	973
