= Consorzio Vino Chianti =

- Official language: Italian
- president: Giovanni Busi
- Employees: 10 (2023)

The Chianti Wine Consortium is a self-governing association of winegrowers operating in Tuscany, Italy. It was founded in Florence in 1927 with the aim of ensure the quality and authenticity of Chianti wines, which have a long-standing tradition and recognition both in Italy and abroad. The Consorzio protects and promotes the interests of Chianti wine producers from the provinces of Florence, Siena, Arezzo, Pisa, Prato, and Pistoia.

== History ==
In the early 20th century, the Chianti region faced a challenge meeting the increasing demand for its renowned red wine. To address this, winemakers from neighboring areas began producing a similar wine using the same methods and grape blends but outside the Chianti origin zone. Initially called "in the style of Chianti," this wine was eventually sold under the label Chianti. However, this raised concerns about protecting the original Chianti wine from counterfeiting, adulteration, and imitation.

To preserve the unique identity of Chianti, producers from the region established different associations to safeguard the quality and branding of Chianti wine by defending its heritage, traditional practices, and combating unauthorized use of the name. One was the Consorzio Vino Chianti, in 1927.

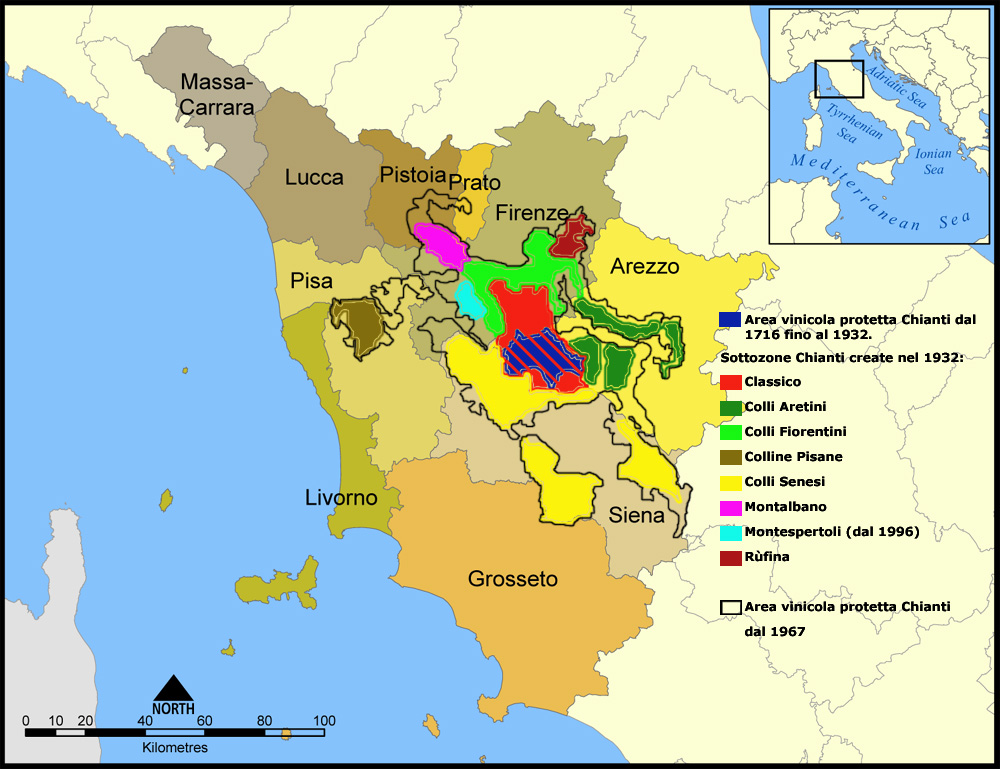
The areas of Chianti in Tuscany

On February 22, 1927, the consortium was initiated by 30 pioneering Florentine winegrowers. In 1932, through a ministerial decree on July 31, the production territory of the typical "Chianti" wine was delineated by law for the first time. Seven production zones were identified, and the oldest original zone was recognized as having distinctive characteristics to be called "Chianti Classico." It was joined by the other recognized zones - Montalbano, Rùfina, Colli Fiorentini, Colli Senesi, Chianti Colli Aretini, and Chianti Colline Pisane - covering areas located within five provinces: Florence, Siena, Arezzo, Pisa, and Pistoia. The decree also legally recognized the establishment of the Consortium for the wine's defense, allowing these zones to use the term "Chianti."

In 1967, "Chianti" obtained Denominazione di origine controllata status (Controlled Designation of Origin, or DOC) with approved regulations to guarantee quality. In the 1970s and 1980s, Chianti gained considerable domestic and international popularity. In July 1984, it received Controlled and Guaranteed Designation of Origin (DOCG) status, the highest level of Italian wine classification.

== Current Denominations ==
The current denominations, including additional mentions and "subzones," provided by the production regulations "Chianti," overseen by the ministerial body Consorzio Vino Chianti, are as follows:

- Chianti Classico DOCG
- Chianti Riserva DOCG
- Chianti Superiore DOCG
- Colli dell'Etruria Centrale DOC
- Vin Santo del Chianti DOC
- Vin Santo del Chianti Riserva DOC
- Vin Santo del Chianti Occhio di Pernice DOC
- Vin Santo del Chianti Occhio di Pernice Riserva DOC

== Activities ==
The area protected by the Chianti Wine Consortium brings together over 3,000 companies, with a declared productive vineyard area of 15,500 hectares, which produce every year over one million quintals of grapes intended for the distribution of Chianti D.O.P. Wine in about 100 million bottles.

The Consortium's activity is carried out at various levels.

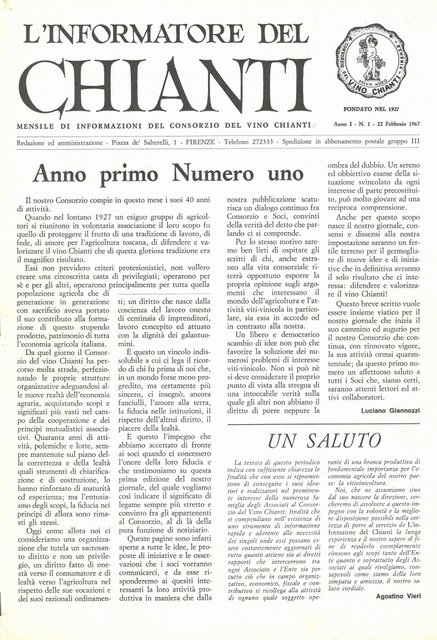
The Chianti informant, year 1, no. 1, 1967

Publications

The Consorzio have been publishing the monthly magazine L'informatore del Chianti. Mensile di informazione del Consorzio del vino Chianti (The Chianti Informant) since February 1967.

Recognition "erga omnes"

In September 2012, with a Decree of the Ministry of Agricultural, Food and Forestry Policies, the Consortium obtained the Recognition "erga omnes" which conferred upon it the tasks of carrying out functions of protection, promotion, supervision, consumer information and general care of the interests relating to the Chianti D.O.C.G. The mandate, subsequently renewed every three years, also includes the protection of the Designation of origins of Vin Santo del Chianti, Colli dell'Etruria Centrale and Bianco dell'Empolese. The latest renewal of the mandate was confirmed in 2022.

Assistance

Assistance to members in the various phases of their wine-growing activity, including the administrative procedures required by law and by the Regulations of the Chianti D.O.C.G. and other D.O.C.s for which it has the mandate.

Representation

The Consorzio dehandles communication with institutions, the media, and the public regarding the characteristics of the protected wines.

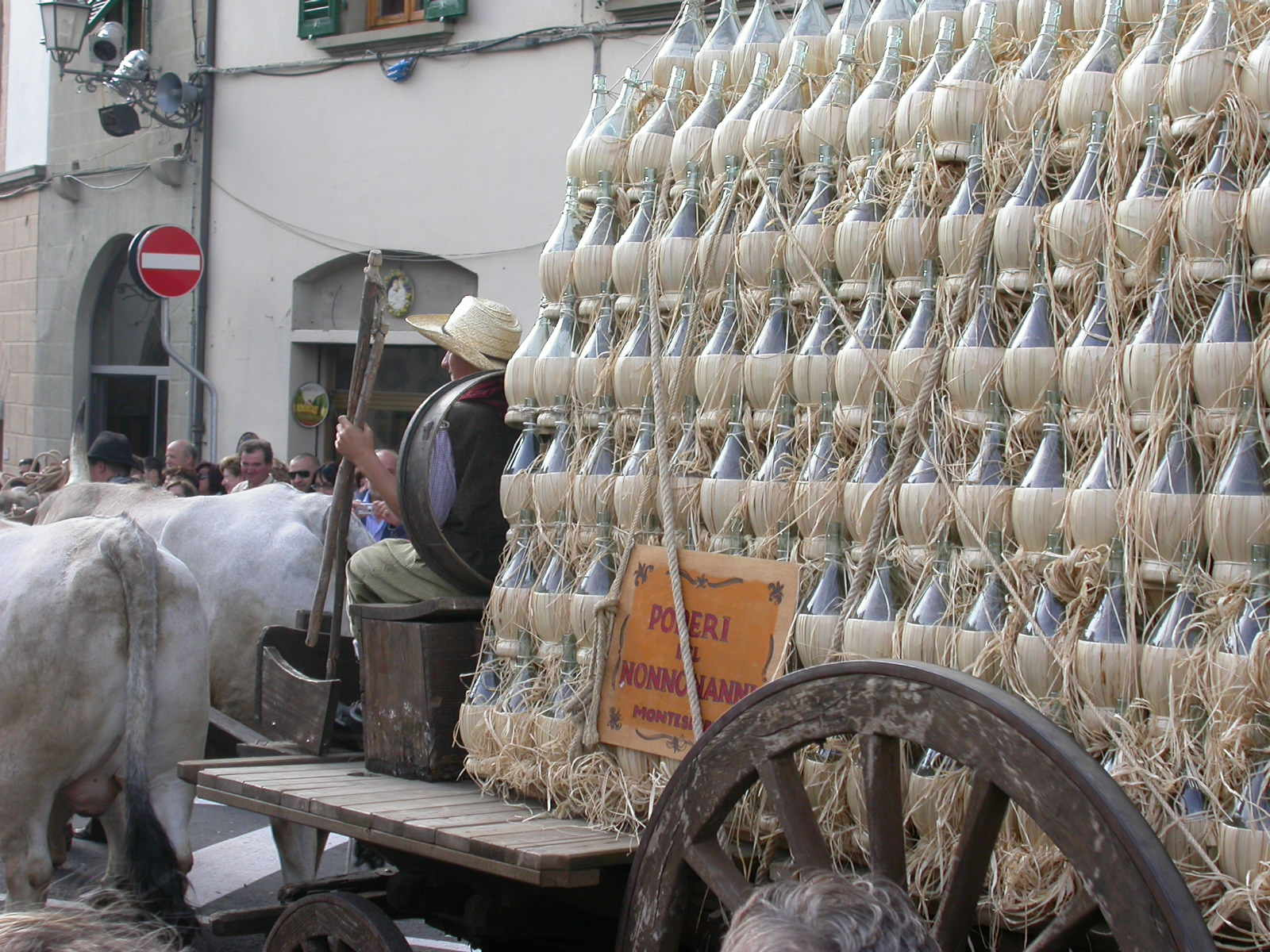
Historical reconstruction at the Chianti Exhibition in Montespertoli (2007 edition)

For this purpose in March 2016, together with 21 other Tuscan protection consortia, it founded A.VI.TO (Association of Tuscan D.O.P and I.G.P. Wines), the first unitary association representing quality Tuscan viticulture which aims to network with institutions, local authorities, trade associations and professional organizations, to enhance and protect the collective interests of the Tuscan wine industry. In July 2018, together with 11 other consortia, it also contributed to the foundation of PROMOVITO, an association that deals with dissemination, information and promotional activities in Italy and abroad by participating in trade fairs and taking advantage of the European funds established by EU Regulation 1305/2013 and by the Rural Development Program (PSR) 2014/2020 of the Tuscany Region.

Market surveillance

The Consortium's Inspection Service operates in the marketing phase of Chianti D.O.C.G. wine, both independently and in collaboration with public and private control bodies, in order to safeguard the quality of the wine and protect the consumer. The service is carried out both in Italy and abroad according to specific control plans approved by the Ministry of Agriculture, Food Sovereignty and Forestry. The service is implemented through the collection and analysis of wine packages, bearing the name CHIANTI on the label, sold by small and/or large retailers (direct sales and HoReCa channel); any discrepancies with respect to the physical and chemical requirements provided for in the Regulations are reported to the competent authorities. Furthermore, the Consortium is very active in Web monitoring in order to combat improper, unauthorized and fraudulent uses of the D.O.C.G.s and D.O.C.s under its protection.

Promotion

It is dedicated to spreading the name Chianti D.O.P. wine in its various specifics, both in established markets and in emerging countries. It organizes trade fair or professional events aimed at commerce, the press, as well as Chianti Lovers. With the "Erga omnes" Recognition, the burdens of these multiple activities are extended to all players in the supply chain, regardless of whether they are members or not.

Name management

The Consortium is the entity that schedules the timing of growth, production or its slowdown and anything else necessary for the proper management of the name, according to the needs of production and market balance. It has also been granted the role of subject suitable for the distribution of State seals, i.e. the seals of guarantee that certify compliance with all the conditions and requirements set out in the wine's production regulations.

Processed products

Law no. 238 of December 12, 2016, specifically Article 44, paragraph nine allows companies that request it to cite PDO and PGI wines in the labeling, presentation or advertising of foods that in their production processes have used PDO or PGI wines.

The Consorzio, by virtue of its "Erga omnes" Recognition, oversees and issues, where the conditions set out in a specific internal regulation are met, the inclusion in the label of the name for which it has the mandate. The most common foods that contain Chianti DOP wine among the ingredients are: salami, cheeses and ragù.

== Bibliography ==
- Peronetto, Lamberto (1967). Il magnifico Chianti: note per una storia del vino Chianti [The Magnificent Chianti: Notes for a History of Chianti Wine] (in Italian). Verona: Enostampa.
- Saltini, Antonio (2009). Vino, conti e contadini. Cinquant'anni di scontri per le denominazioni del Chianti [Wine, counts, and peasants. Fifty years of clashes for the denominations of Chianti] (in Italian). Firenze: Nuova Terra Antica. ISBN 978-88-964590-5-8.
