= San Juan Lachigalla =

- Municipality and town
- Location in Mexico
- Coordinates: 16°36′N 96°32′W
- Country: Mexico
- State: Oaxaca

Area
  - Total: 136.51 km^{2} (52.71 sq mi)

Population (2005)
  - Total: 3,363
- Time zone: UTC-6 (Central Standard Time)

San Juan Lachigalla is a town and municipality in Oaxaca in south-western Mexico. The municipality covers an area of 136.51 km^{2}. It is part of the Ejutla District in the south of the Valles Centrales Region.

As of 2005, the municipality had a total population of 3,363.
