= San Vicente Coatlán =

Coordinates: 16°23′N 96°51′W

- Municipality and town
- Interactive map of San Vicente Coatlán
- Country: Mexico
- State: Oaxaca

Population (2010)
  - Total: 3,964
- Time zone: UTC-6 (Central Standard Time)

San Vicente Coatlán is a town and municipality in Oaxaca in south-western Mexico. It is part of the Ejutla District in the south of the Valles Centrales Region.

In 2015, the population of the town was 3923, with an area of 105 km^{2}.
