= Sânmartin =

Sânmartin, Sânmărtin, Sânmartinu or Sânmărtinu may refer to several places in Romania:

- Diciosânmartin (also Dicsőszentmárton and Târnava-Sân-Martin), historic names for Târnăveni, a city in Mureș County
- Sânmartin, Bihor, a commune in Bihor County
  - CSC Sânmartin, an association football club
- Sânmartin, Cluj, a commune in Cluj County
- Sânmartin, Harghita, a commune in Harghita County
- Sânmartin, a village in Macea Commune, Arad County
- Sânmărtin, a village in Chinteni Commune, Cluj County
- Sânmartin de Beiuş, a village in Pocola Commune, Bihor County
- Sânmartinu Maghiar, a village in Uivar Commune, Timiș County
- Sânmartinu Sârbesc, a village in Peciu Nou Commune, Timiș County
- Sânmărtinu de Câmpie and Valea Sânmărtinului, villages in Râciu Commune, Mureș County

== See also ==
- St. Martin (disambiguation)
- Sankt Martin (disambiguation)
