= General José de San Martín (disambiguation) =

José de San Martín (1778–1850) was a Spanish-Argentine general and the prime leader of the southern and central parts of South America's struggle for independence from the Spanish Empire.

General José de San Martín or General San Martín may also refer to:

- San Martín, Buenos Aires, full name "Ciudad del Libertador General Don José de San Martín"
- General José de San Martín, Chaco
- Libertador General San Martín Department, Chaco
- Libertador General José de San Martín Airport
- SS Thuringia (1922), named "General San Martín"
- General San Martín Partido
- General San Martín Department, Córdoba
- Libertador General San Martín, Jujuy
- Libertador General San Martín Department, San Luis
- Centro Cultural General San Martín
- Ferrocarril General San Martín
- Teatro General San Martín in Buenos Aires
- Teatro del Libertador General San Martín in Córdoba
- General San Martín Park
- General Jose de San Martin Memorial, Washington, D.C.
- General San Martin station

== See also ==
- San Martín (disambiguation)
