= La Pe =

- Municipality and town
- Location in Mexico La Pe (Mexico)
- Coordinates: 16°38′N 96°48′W
- Country: Mexico
- State: Oaxaca

Area
  - Total: 26.79 km^{2} (10.34 sq mi)

Population (2020)
  - Total: 3,052
- Time zone: UTC-6 (Central)

La Pe is a town and municipality in Oaxaca in southern Mexico.

== Geography ==
It is part of the Ejutla District in the south of the Valles Centrales Region. This municipality is located in the central part of the state of Oaxaca, in the central valley region. It belongs to the Ejutla district. It is located in 96° 48' west longitude, 16° 38' north latitude and its height is 1490 meters over the sea level. To the north it there is the municipality of Ayoquezco de Aldama and Ejutla de Crespo, to the south is Ejutla de Crespo, to the east is Ejutla de Crespo and to the west with Ejutla de Crespo. It has an area of 26.79 square kilometers. It is not a mountainous area. Its weather is lukewarm with very little variations during the year. It has semiarid vegetation.

== Population ==
The majority of the inhabitants are of the Catholic religion. In 2020, the municipality had a total population of 3,052, up from 2,446 in 2010 and from 2,135 in 2005.

== History ==
In the pre-Hispanic era some isolated Zapotec groups were the first population of this municipality. In Mexico's independence the first big ranch of the municipality got established. There was a construction of rail roads that belong to the Mexican South train company. Sugar, corn and beans began being cultivated, agriculture was the main economic activity.
