= Ejutla de Crespo =

Ejutla de crespo
- Municipality and town
- Heroica Ciudad de Ejutla de Crespo
- Nickname: Ejutla
- Location within Mexico
- Coordinates: 16°34′02″N 96°43′51″W
- Country: Mexico
- State: Oaxaca
- Founded: 1524
- Elevation (of seat): 1,460 m (4,790 ft)

Population (2005) Municipality
  - Total: 17,232
  - Seat: 7,460
- Time zone: UTC-6 (Central (US Central))
- Postal code (of seat): 71500

Ejutla de Crespo is a city and a municipality of the same name, in the central valleys of the Mexican state of Oaxaca. It is part of the Ejutla District in the south of the Valles Centrales Region.

"Ejutla" is from the Nahuatl exotl and tla, meaning "place of abundant green beans"; "Crespo" is for Fr. Manuel Sabino Crespo, who fought alongside Morelos in the War of Independence and was executed on 19 October 1815 and in whose memory the State Congress decreed a change in the name from Villa de Ejutla to Heroica Ciudad de Ejutla de Crespo on 11 December 1885.

== The town ==
The settlement was founded in 524 by the Zapotecs under Meneyadia.

== The municipality ==
As municipal seat, Ejutla has governing jurisdiction over the following communities:

Agua Rica, Ampliación del Progreso, Barranca Larga, Barrio Chino, Cerro Yaniche, El Arrogante Justo Benítez, El Cabrito, El Cerro de las Huertas, El Palenque, El Progreso (Barrio de Coapa), El Puente, El Saúz, El Tortuguero, El Vergel, Guelaxico, Hacienda Vieja, Higo Mocho (Piedra Cuache), La Capilla, La Cieneguilla, La Ermita, La Escalera, La Lobera, La Noria, La Noria de Ortiz, Los Ocotes, Monte del Toro, Nuevo Venustiano Carranza, Rancho Brujo (El Brujo), Rancho Nogal (Los Jarquines), Rinconada de San Diego, San Joaquín, San Juan Coatecas Bajas, San Juan Logolava, San Matías Chilazoa, Santa Cruz Nexila, Santa Marta Chichihualtepec, and Yegoseve

== Language ==
Most of the population speaks Spanish, and the indigenous community in this municipality uses ten different dialects. The dialects spoken are Nahuatl, Mazateco, Otomi, Totonaco, Chinanteco, Mixteco, Triqui, Mixe, Amuzgo and Zapoteco.
