= San Andrés Zabache =

- Municipality and town
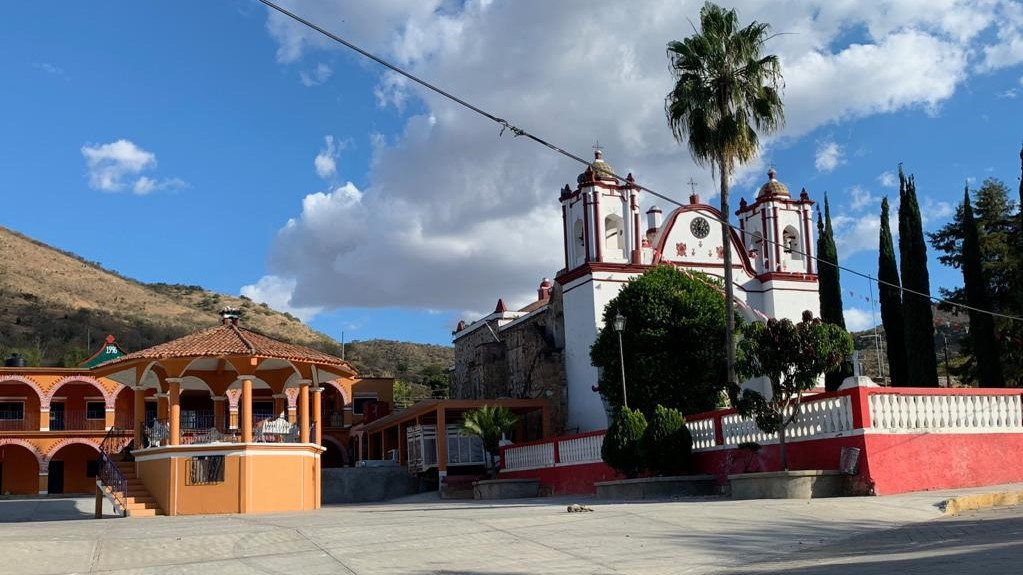

- Location in Mexico
- Coordinates: 16°36′N 96°51′W
- Country: Mexico
- State: Oaxaca

Area
  - Total: 35.72 km^{2} (13.79 sq mi)

Population (2005)
  - Total: 756
- Time zone: UTC-6 (Central Standard Time)

San Andrés Zabache is a town and municipality in Oaxaca in south-western Mexico. The municipality covers an area of 35.72 km^{2}. It is part of the Ejutla District in the south of the Valles Centrales Region.

As of 2005, the municipality had a total population of 756.
