= Chiocchio =

- Frazione di Chiocchio
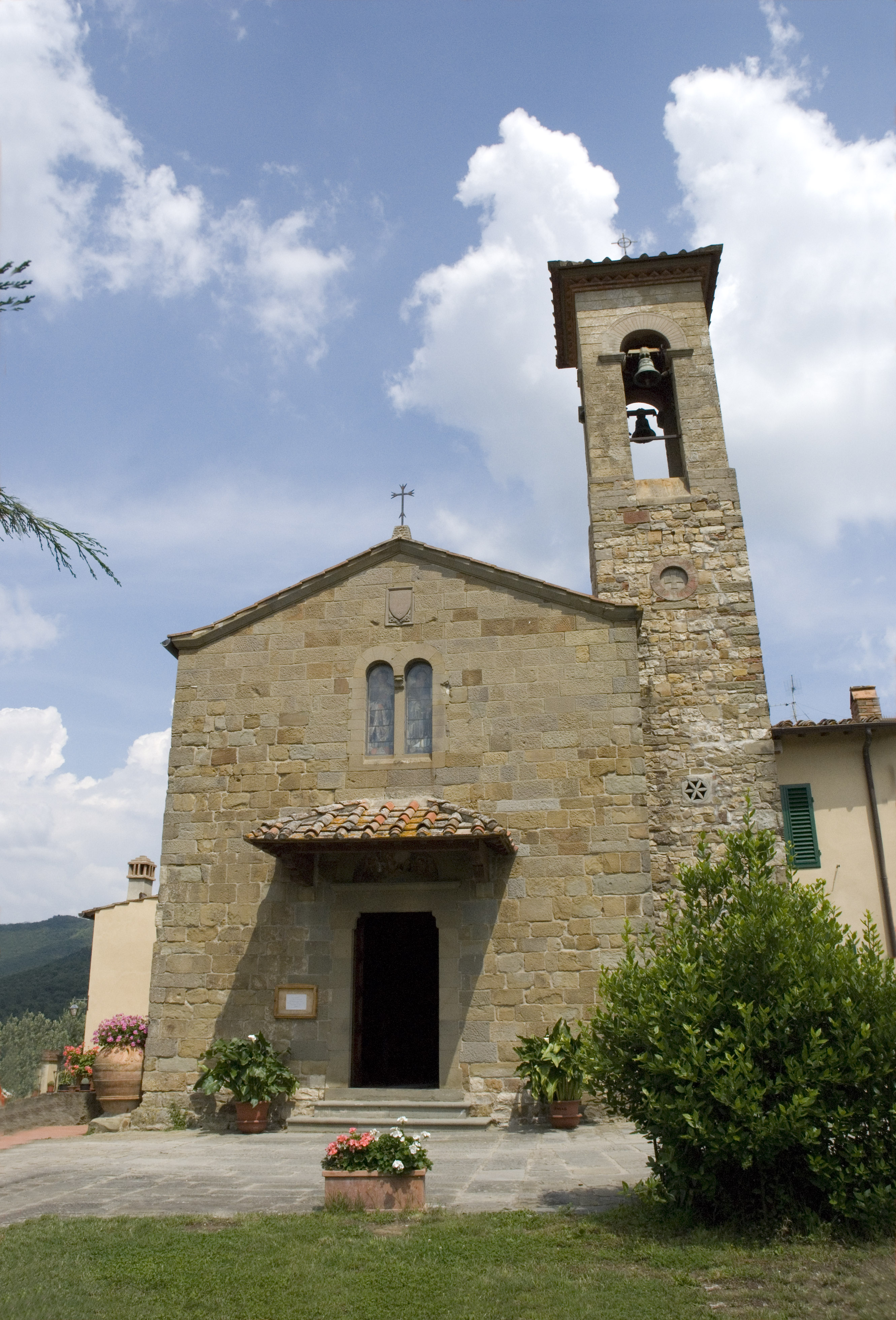
- Pieve di San Donato a Mugnana

- Location within Italy
- Coordinates: 43°38′22″N 11°18′48″E
- Country: Italy
- Region: Tuscany
- Province: Florence (FI)
- Comune: Greve
- Elevation: 286 m (938 ft)

Population (2001)
  - Total: 592
- Postal code: 50020
- Area code: 055

Chiocchio (UK: /ˈkjɒkjɒ/) is a village (frazione) of the comune of Greve in Chianti, Italy. It is located 7.7 kilometres (4.8 mi) by road north of the town of Greve in Chianti. Population 592 (2001). It is part of the Chianti making area, with vineyards and olive trees. It contains a number of religious landmarks, including the Casa-torre di Fonzacchino, L'oratorio di San Giusto a Montemartiri, Chiesa di San Michele a Rugliana, the Monastero di Santa Margherita a Sugame, San Lorenzo al Frassino, L'Oratorio di Monte Domini, and the churches of San Gaudenzio and San Michele. Also nearby is the Castello di Mugnana. In the hamlet of Cintoia, several kilometres to the east, is the small church of Santa Maria a Cintoia, noted for its "beautiful 15th-century panel".
