= Coatecas Altas =

- Municipality and town
- Location in Mexico
- Coordinates: 16°32′N 96°40′W
- Country: Mexico
- State: Oaxaca

Area
  - Total: 125.03 km^{2} (48.27 sq mi)

Population (2005)
  - Total: 4,822
- Time zone: UTC-6 (Central Standard Time)

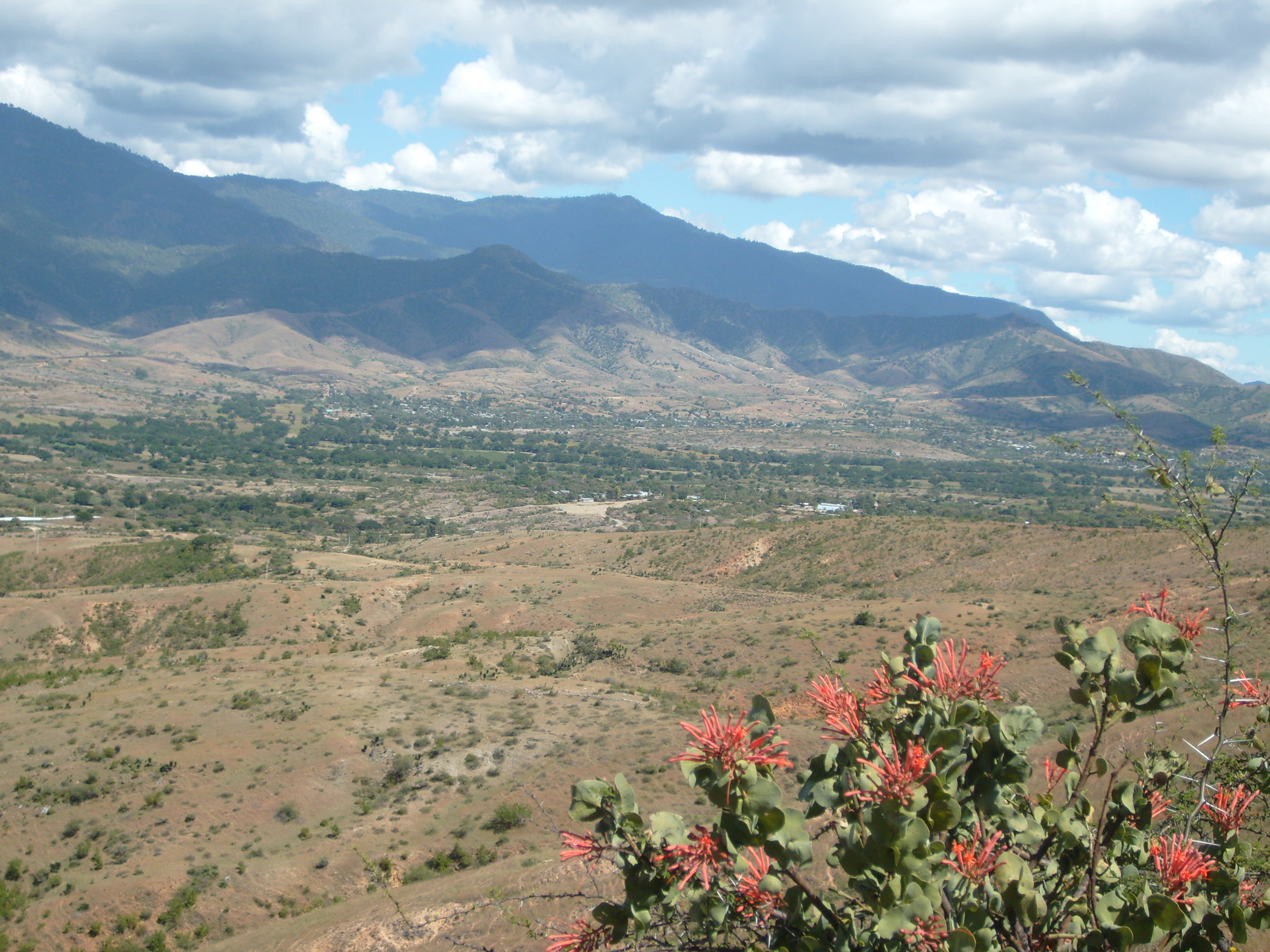
View of Coatecas Altas

Coatecas Altas is a town and municipality in Oaxaca in south-western Mexico. The municipality covers an area of 125.03 km^{2}. It is part of the Ejutla District in the south of the Valles Centrales Region.

As of 2005, the municipality had a total population of 4,822.
