= Chianti =

Regional variety of Italian wine

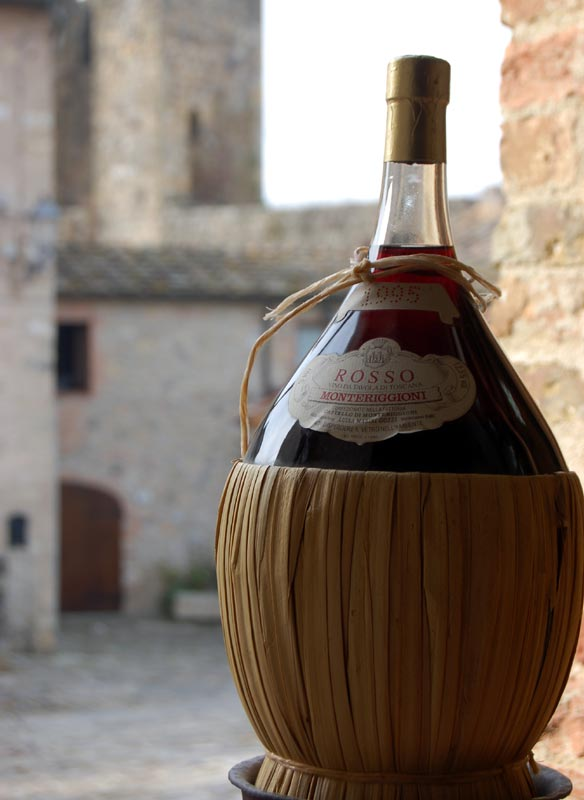
A bottle of ordinary Tuscan table wine in the kind of traditional fiasco formerly used for Chianti

Chianti (Note: /kiˈænti/, also US: /-ˈɑːn-/, Italian: [ˈkjanti]) is an Italian red wine produced in the Chianti region of central Tuscany, principally from the Sangiovese grape. It was historically associated with a squat bottle enclosed in a straw basket, called a fiasco ("flask"; pl.: fiaschi). However, the fiasco is now only used by a few makers of the wine; most Chianti is bottled in more standard-shaped wine bottles. In the late 19th century, Baron Bettino Ricasoli (later Prime Minister of the Kingdom of Italy) helped establish Sangiovese as the blend's dominant grape variety, creating the blueprint for today's Chianti wines.

The first definition of a wine area called Chianti was made in 1716. It described the area near the villages of Gaiole, Castellina and Radda; the so-called Lega del Chianti and later Provincia del Chianti (Chianti province). In 1932 the Chianti area was completely redrawn and divided into seven sub-areas: Classico, Colli Aretini, Colli Fiorentini, Colline Pisane, Colli Senesi, Montalbano and Rùfina. Most of the villages that in 1932 were added to the newly defined Chianti Classico region added in Chianti to their names, for example Greve in Chianti, which amended its name in 1972. Wines labelled Chianti Classico come from the largest sub-area of Chianti, which includes the original Chianti heartland. Only Chianti from this sub-zone may display the black rooster (gallo nero) seal on the neck of the bottle, which indicates that the producer of the wine is a member of the Chianti Classico Consortium, the local association of producers. Other variants, with the exception of Rufina north-east of Florence and Montalbano south of Pistoia, originate in the named provinces: Siena for the Colli Senesi, Florence for the Colli Fiorentini, Arezzo for the Colli Aretini and Pisa for the Colline Pisane. In 1996 part of the Colli Fiorentini sub-area was renamed Montespertoli.

During the 1970s producers started to reduce the quantity of white grapes in Chianti. In 1995 it became legal to produce a Chianti with 100% Sangiovese. For a wine to retain the name of Chianti it must be produced with at least 80% Sangiovese grapes. Aged Chianti (at least 6 months in barrel and 3 more in bottle before release, instead of 6 months aging without barreling necessary) may be labelled as Riserva. Chianti that meets more stringent requirements (lower yield, higher alcohol content and dry extract) may be labelled as Chianti Superiore, although Chianti from the Classico sub-area is not allowed in any event to be labelled as Superiore.

== History ==
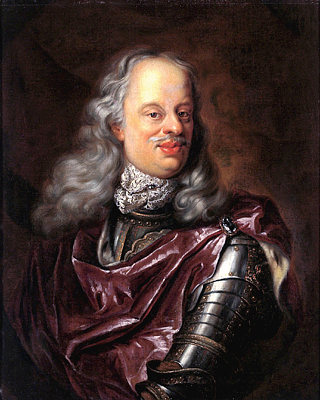
In 1716 Cosimo III de' Medici, the Grand Duke of Tuscany, legislated the first official boundaries of the Chianti region in what is today part of the Chianti Classico DOCG.

The earliest documentation of a "Chianti wine" dates back to the 14th century, when viticulture was known to flourish in the "Chianti Mountains" around Florence. A military league called Lega del Chianti (League of Chianti) was formed around 1250 between the townships of Castellina, Gaiole and Radda, which would lead to the wine from this area taking on a similar name. In 1398 the earliest-known record notes Chianti as a white wine, though the red wines of Chianti were also discussed around the same time in similar documents.

The first attempt to classify Chianti wine in any way came in 1427, when Florence developed a tariff system for the wines of the surrounding countryside, including an area referred to as "Chianti and its entire province". In 1716 Cosimo III de' Medici, Grand Duke of Tuscany, issued an edict legislating that the three villages of the Lega del Chianti (Castellina in Chianti, Gaiole in Chianti and Radda in Chianti) as well as the village of Greve and a 3.2-kilometre-long stretch (2-mile) of hillside north of Greve near Spedaluzzo as the only officially recognised producers of Chianti. This delineation existed until July 1932, when the Italian government expanded the Chianti zone to include the outlying areas of Barberino Val d'Elsa, Chiocchio, Robbiano, San Casciano in Val di Pesa and Strada. Subsequent expansions in 1967 would eventually result in the Chianti zone covering a very large area all over central Tuscany.

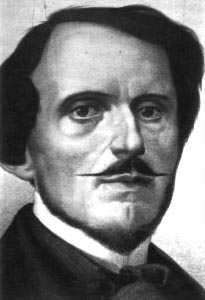
Baron Bettino Ricasoli developed the first "modern" Chianti recipe that was Sangiovese based.

By the 18th century Chianti was widely recognised as a red wine, but the exact composition and grape varieties used to make Chianti at this point is unknown. Ampelographers find clues about which grape varieties were popular at the time in the writings of Italian writer Cosimo Villifranchi, who noted that Canaiolo was a widely planted variety in the area along with Sangiovese, Mammolo and Marzemino. It was not until the work of the Italian statesman Bettino Ricasoli that the modern Chianti recipe as a Sangiovese-based wine would take shape.

Prior to Ricasoli, Canaiolo was emerging as the dominant variety in the Chianti blend with Sangiovese and Malvasia Bianca Lunga playing supporting roles. In the mid-19th century, Ricasoli developed a recipe for Chianti that was based primarily on Sangiovese. Though he is often credited with creating and disseminating a specific formula (typically reported as 70% Sangiovese, 20% Canaiolo, 10% Malvasia Bianca Lunga), a review of his correspondence of the time does not corroborate this. In addition, his efforts were quickly corrupted by other local winemakers (for example, replacing Malvasia with Trebbiano Toscano, or relying too heavily on the latter), leading to further misunderstanding of the "Ricasoli formula". In 1967, the Denominazione di origine controllata (DOC) regulation set by the Italian government was based on a loose interpretation of Ricasoli's "recipe", calling for a Sangiovese-based blend with 10–30% Malvasia and Trebbiano.

The late 19th century saw a period of economic and political upheaval. First came oidium and then the phylloxera epidemic would take its toll on the vineyards of Chianti just as they had ravaged vineyards across the rest of Europe. The chaos and poverty following the Risorgimento heralded the beginning of the Italian diaspora that would take Italian vineyard workers and winemakers abroad as immigrants to new lands. Those that stayed behind and replanted choose high-yielding varieties like Trebbiano and Sangiovese clones such as the Sangiovese di Romagna from the nearby Romagna region. Following the Second World War, the general trend in the world wine market for cheap, easy-drinking wine saw a brief boom for the region. With over-cropping and an emphasis on quantity over quality, the reputation of Chianti among consumers eventually plummeted. By the 1950s, Trebbiano (which is known for its neutral flavours) made up to 30% of many mass-market Chiantis.

By the late 20th century, Chianti was often associated with basic Chianti sold in a squat bottle enclosed in a straw basket, called a fiasco. However, during the same period, a group of ambitious producers began working outside the boundaries of DOC regulations to make what they believed would be a higher-quality wine. These wines eventually became known as the "Super Tuscans".

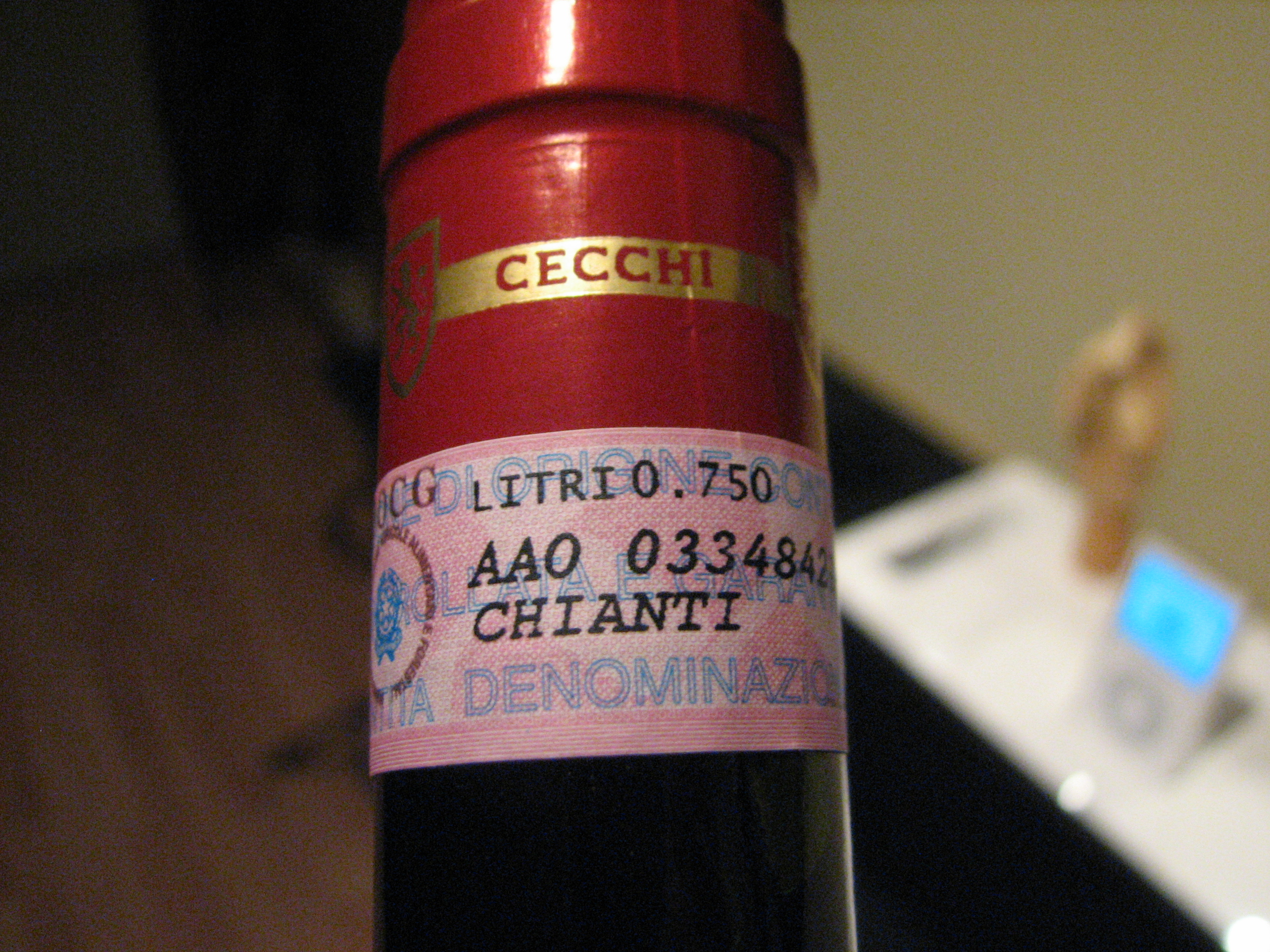
The Italian DOCG Chianti label

Many of the producers behind the Super Tuscan movement were originally Chianti producers who were rebelling against what they felt were antiquated DOC regulations. Some of these producers wanted to make Chiantis that were 100% varietal Sangiovese. Others wanted the flexibility to experiment with blending French grape varieties such as Cabernet Sauvignon and Merlot or to not be required to blend in any white grape varieties. The late 20th century saw a flurry of creativity and innovation in the Chianti zones as producers experimented with new grape varieties and introduced modern wine-making techniques such as the use of new oak barrels. The prices and wine ratings of some Super Tuscans would regularly eclipse those of DOC-sanctioned Chiantis. The success of the Super Tuscans encouraged government officials to reconsider the DOC regulations in order to bring some of these wines back into the fold labelled as Chianti.

== Chianti subregions ==
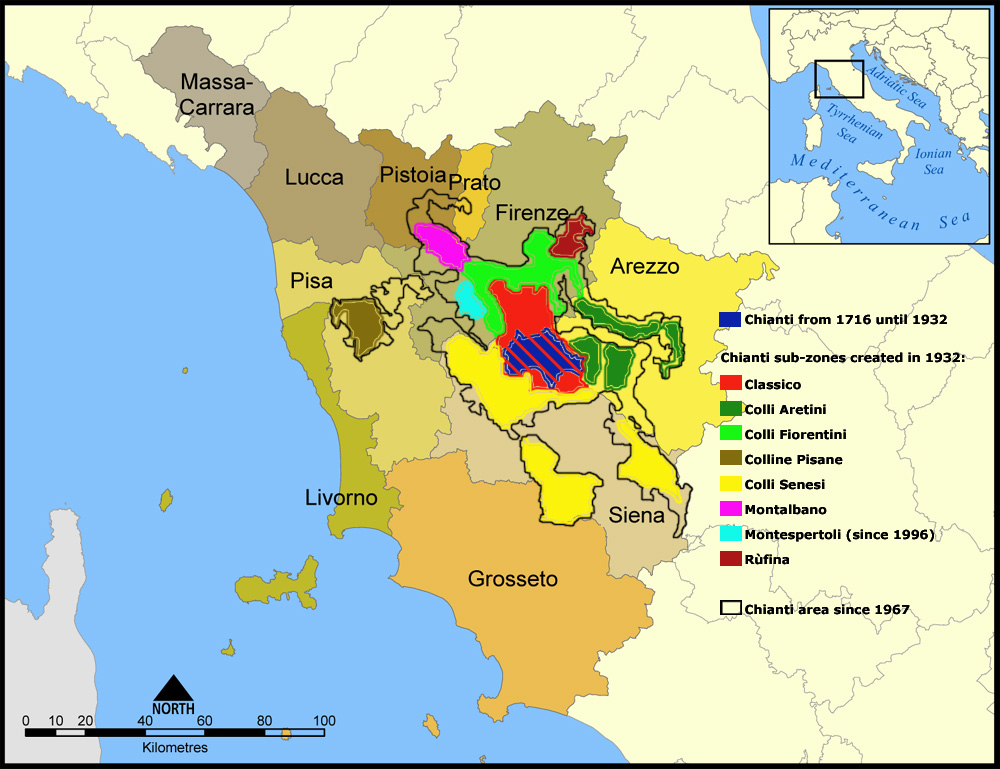
Chianti wine area within Tuscany

The Chianti region covers a vast area of Tuscany and includes within its boundaries several overlapping Denominazione di origine controllata (DOC) and Denominazione di Origine Controllata e Garantita (DOCG) regions. Other well known Sangiovese-based Tuscan wines such as Brunello di Montalcino and Vino Nobile di Montepulciano could be bottled and labelled under the most basic designation of "Chianti" if their producers chose to do so. Within the collective Chianti region more than 8 million cases of wines classified as DOC-level or above are produced each year. Today, most Chianti falls under two major designations of Chianti DOCG, which includes basic level Chianti, as well as that from seven designated sub-zones, and Chianti Classico DOCG. Together, these two Chianti zones produce the largest volume of DOC/G wines in Italy.

The Chianti DOCG covers all the Chianti wine and includes a large stretch of land encompassing the western reaches of the province of Pisa near the coast of the Tyrrhenian Sea, the Florentine hills in the province of Florence to the north, to the province of Arezzo in the east and the Siena hills to the south. Within this regions are vineyards that overlap the DOCG regions of Brunello di Montalcino, Vino Nobile di Montepulciano and Vernaccia di San Gimignano. Any Sangiovese-based wine made according to the Chianti guidelines from these vineyards can be labelled and marked under the basic Chianti DOCG should the producer wish to use the designation.

Within the Chianti DOCG there are eight defined sub-zones that are permitted to affix their name to the wine label. Wines that are labelled as simply Chianti are made either from a blend from these sub-zones or include grapes from peripheral areas not within the boundaries of a sub-zone. The sub-zones are (clockwise from the north): the Colli Fiorentini which is located south of the city of Florence; Chianti Rufina in the northeastern part of the zone located around the commune of Rufina; Classico in the centre of Chianti, across the provinces of Florence and Siena; Colli Aretini in the Arezzo province to the east; Colli Senesi south of Chianti Classico in the Siena hills, which is the largest of the sub-zones and includes the Brunello di Montalcino and Vino Nobile di Montepulciano areas; Colline Pisane, the westernmost sub-zone in the province of Pisa; Montespertoli located within the Colli Fiorentini around the commune of Montespertoli; Montalbano in the north-west part of the zone which includes the Carmignano DOCG.

As of 2006, there were 318 hectares (786 acres) under production in Montalbano, 905 ha (2,236 acres) in the Colli Fiorentini, 57 ha (140 acres) in Montespertoli, 740 ha (1,840 acres) in Rufina, 3,550 ha (8,780 acres) in the Colli Senesi, 150 ha (380 acres) in Colline Pisane, 649 ha (1,603 acres) in the Colli Aretini, and an additional 10,324 ha (25,511 acres) in the peripheral areas that do not fall within one of the sub-zone classifications. Wines produced from these vineyards are labelled simply "Chianti".

=== Chianti Classico ===
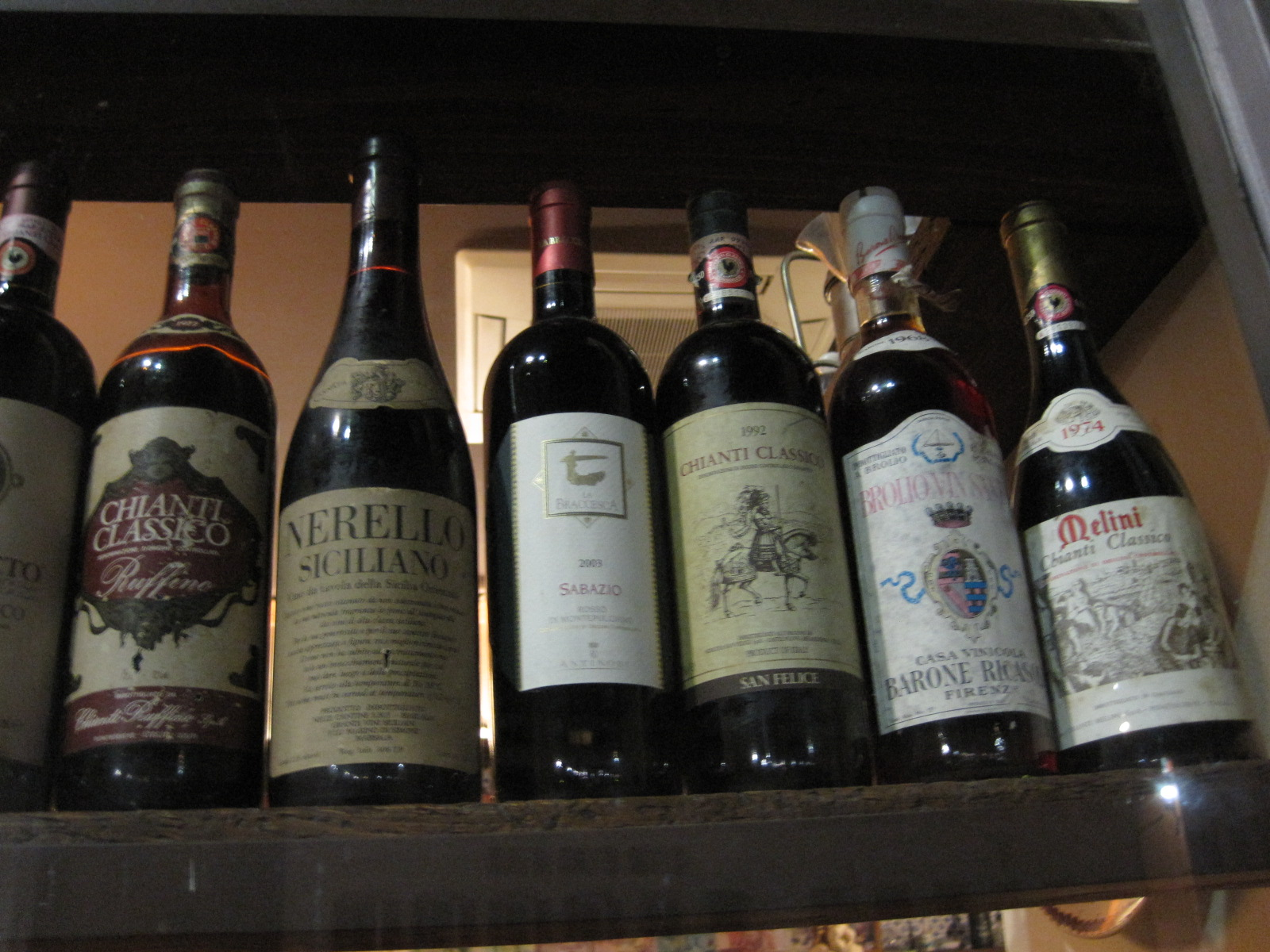
Chianti Classico premium wine

The original area dictated by the edict of Cosimo III de' Medici would eventually be considered the heart of the modern "Chianti Classico" subregion. As of 2006, there were 7,140 ha (17,640 acres) of vineyards in the Chianti Classico subregion. The Chianti Classico subregion covers an area of approximate 260 km^{2} (100 square miles) between the city of Florence to the north and Siena to the south. The four communes of Castellina in Chianti, Gaiole in Chianti, Greve in Chianti and Radda in Chianti are located entirely within the boundaries of the Classico area with parts of Barberino Val d'Elsa, San Casciano in Val di Pesa and Tavarnelle Val di Pesa in the province of Florence as well as Castelnuovo Berardenga and Poggibonsi in the province of Siena included within the permitted boundaries of Chianti Classico.

The soil and geography of this subregion can be quite varied, with altitudes ranging from 250 to 610 m (820 to 2,000 feet), and rolling hills producing differing macroclimates. There are two main soil types in the area: a weathered sandstone known as alberese and a bluish-gray chalky marlstone known as galestro. The soil in the north is richer and more fertile with more galestro, with the soil gradually becoming harder and stonier with more albarese in the south. In the north, the Arno River can have an influence on the climate, keeping the temperatures slightly cooler, an influence that diminishes further south in the warmer Classico territory towards Castelnuovo Berardenga.

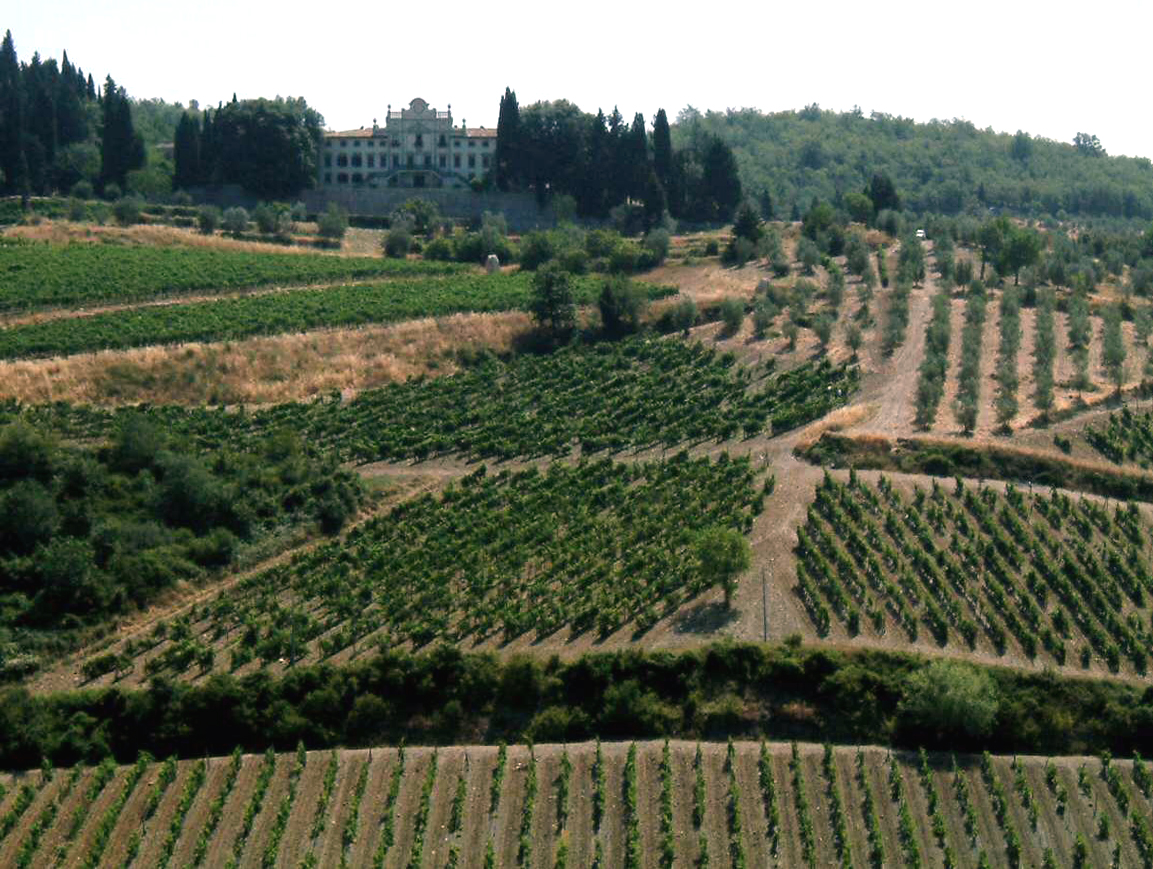
Vineyards in Gaiole in Chianti in the Chianti Classico area

Chianti Classico are premium Chianti wines that tend to be medium-bodied with firm tannins and medium-high to high acidity. Floral, cherry and light nutty notes are characteristic aromas with the wines expressing more notes on the mid-palate and finish than at the front of the mouth. As with Bordeaux, the different zones of Chianti Classico have unique characteristics that can be exemplified and perceived in some wines from those areas. According to Master of Wine Mary Ewing-Mulligan, Chianti Classico wines from the Castellina area tend to have a very delicate aroma and flavour, Castelnuovo Berardegna wines tend to be the most ripe and richest tasting, wines from Gaiole tend to have been characterised by their structure and firm tannins while wines from the Greve area tend to have very concentrated flavours.

Black rooster seal of the Consorzio Chianti Classico

The production of Chianti Classico is realised under the supervision of Consorzio del Vino Chianti Classico, a union of producers in the Chianti Classico subregion. The Consorzio was founded with the aim of promoting the wines of the subregion, improving quality and preventing wine fraud. Since the 1980s, the foundation has sponsored extensive research into the viticultural and winemaking practice of the Chianti Classico area, particularly in the area of clonal research. In the last three decades, more than 50% of the vineyards in the Chianti Classico subregion have been replanted with improved Sangiovese clones and modern vineyard techniques as part of the Consorzio Chianti Classico's project "Chianti 2000".

In 2014, a new category of Chianti Classico was introduced: Chianti Classico Gran Selezione. Gran Selezione is made exclusively from a winery's own grapes grown according to stricter regulations compared to regular Chianti Classico. Gran Selezione is granted to a Chianti Classico after it passes a suitability test conducted by authorised laboratories, and after it is approved by a special tasting committee. The creation of the Chianti Classico Gran Selezione DOCG has been criticized, with some describing it as being "Needless; an extra layer of confusion created by marketing people hoping to help Chianti Classico out of a sales crisis."

=== Greater Chianti region ===
Logo of the Consorzio Vino Chianti (Chianti Wine Consortium), the association of Tuscan winemakers ensuring the quality and authenticity of Chianti wines from different subregions, besides Chianti Classico

Outside of the Chianti Classico area, the wines of the Chianti sub-zone of Rufina are among the most widely recognised and exported from the Chianti region. Located in the Arno valley near the town of Pontassieve, the Rufina region includes much area in the Pomino region, an area that has a long history of wine production. The area is noted for the cool climate of its elevated vineyards located up to 900 m (2,950 feet). The vineyard soils of the area are predominantly marl and chalk. The Florentine merchant families of the Antinori and Frescobaldi own the majority of the vineyards in Rufina. Chianti from the Rufina area is characterised by its multi-layered complexity and elegance.

The Colli Fiorentini subregion has seen an influx of activity and new vineyard development in recent years as wealthy Florentine business people move to the country to plant vineyards and open wineries. Many foreign "œnologues volant" have had a hand in this development, bringing global viticulture and wine-making techniques to the Colli Fiorentini. Located in the hills between the Chianti Classico area and Arno valley, the wines of the Colli Fiorentini vary widely depending on producer, but tend to have a simple structure with strong character and fruit notes. The Montespertoli sub-zone was part of the Colli Fiorentini sub-zone until 2002 when it became its own tiny enclave.

The Montalbano subregion is located in the shadow of the Carmignano DOCG, with much of the Sangiovese going to that wine. A similar situation exists in the Colli Senesi which includes the DOCG region of Vino Nobile di Montepulciano. Both regions rarely appear on wine labels that are exported out of Tuscany. The Colli Pisane area produces typical Chiantis with the lightest body and color. The Colli Aretini is a relatively new area that has seen an influx of investment and new winemaking in recent years.

== Grapes and classification ==
Since 1996 the blend for Chianti and Chianti Classico has been 75–100% Sangiovese, up to 10% Canaiolo and up to 20% of any other approved red grape variety such as Cabernet Sauvignon, Merlot or Syrah. Since 2006, the use of white grape varieties such as Malvasia and Trebbiano have been prohibited in Chianti Classico. Chianti Classico must have a minimum alcohol level of 12% with a minimum of 7 months aging in oak, while Chianti Classicos labeled riserva must be aged at least 24 months at the winery, with a minimum alcohol level of 12.5%. The harvest yields for Chianti Classico are restricted to no more than 7.5 t/ha (3 tonnes per acre). For basic Chianti, the minimum alcohol level is 11.5% with yields restricted to 9 t/ha (4 tonnes per acre).

The aging for basic Chianti DOCG is much less stringent with most varieties allowed to be released to the market on 1 March following the vintage year. The sub-zones of Colli Fiorentini, Montespertoli and Rufina must be aged for a further three months and not released until 1 June. All Chianti Classicos must be held back until 1 October in the year following the vintage.

Comparative table of Chianti laws of production
	normal	Classico	Colli Aretini	Colli Fiorentini	Colli Senesi	Colline Pisane	Montalbano	Montespertoli	Rùfina	Superiore
Max. grape prod. (t/ha)	9.0	7.5	8.0	8.0	8.0	8.0	8.0	8.0	8.0	7.5
Max. grape prod. (kg/vine)	4.0	3.0	4.0	4.0	4.0	4.0	4.0	4.0	4.0	2.2
Min. vines/ha	3,300	3,350	3,300	3,300	3,300	3,300	3,300	3,300	3,300	4,000
Min. age of vineyards (years)	3	4	4	4	4	4	4	4	4	4
Min. wine dry extract (g/L)	19	23	21	21	21	21	21	21	21	22
Min. alcohol cont. (%)	11.5	12.0	11.5	12.0	11.5	11.5	11.5	12.0	12.0	12.0
Min. aging (months)	3	10	3	9	3	3	3	6	9	9

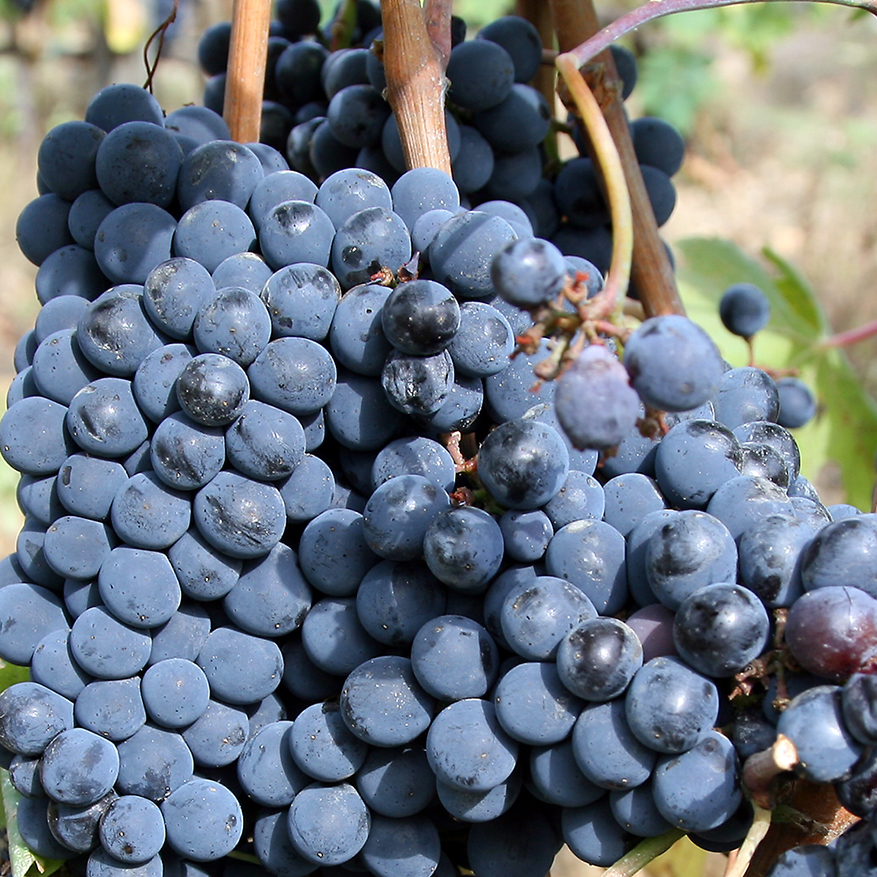
Sangiovese grapes used to make Chianti wine

Jancis Robinson notes that Chianti is sometimes called the "Bordeaux of Italy" but the structure of the wines is very different from any French wine. The flexibility in the blending recipe for Chianti accounts for some of the variability in styles among Chiantis. Lighter-bodied styles will generally have a higher proportion of white grape varieties blended in, while Chiantis that have only red grape varieties will be fuller and richer. While only 15% of Cabernet Sauvignon is permitted in the blend, the nature of the grape variety can have a dominant personality in the Chianti blend and be a strong influence in the wine.

Chianti Classico wines are characterised in their youth by their predominantly floral and cinnamon spicy bouquet. As the wine ages, aromas of tobacco and leather can emerge. Chiantis tend to have medium-high acidity and medium tannins. Basic level Chianti is often characterised by its juicy fruit notes of cherry, plum and raspberry and can range from simple quaffing wines to those approaching the level of Chianti Classico. Wine expert Tom Stevenson notes that these basic everyday-drinking Chiantis are at their peak drinking qualities often between three and five years after vintage, with premium examples having the potential to age for four to eight years. Well-made examples of Chianti Classico often have the potential to age and improve in the bottle for six to twenty years.

=== Chianti Superiore ===
Chianti Superiore is an Italian DOCG wine produced in the provinces of Arezzo, Florence, Pisa, Pistoia, Prato and Siena, in Tuscany. Superiore is a specification for wines produced with a stricter rule of production than other Chianti wines. Chianti Superiore has been authorised since 1996. Chianti Superiore wines can be produced only from grapes cultivated in the Chianti wine areas except from those vineyards that are registered in the Chianti Classico sub-zone. Vineyards registered in Chianti sub-zones other than Classico can produce Chianti Superiore wines but must omit the sub-zone name on the label. Aging is calculated from 1 January after the picking. Chianti Superiore cannot be sold to the consumer before nine months of aging, of which three must be in the bottle. Therefore, it cannot be bottled before the June after picking or sold to consumers before the next September.

2004 production
	Chianti Superiore	Other Chianti	% Ch. Superiore
Registered vineyards (ha)	297.98	25,333.67	1.18%
Grape production (t)	1,808.51	184,023.10	0.98%
Wine production (L)	1,166,169	106,124,871	1.09%

== Special editions ==
Chianti Classico was promoted as the "Official wine of the 2013 UCI Road World Championships" and sold bottles dedicated to the Championships with special labels.

== See also ==
- Chiantishire
- Consorzio Vino Chianti
- Foods containing tyramine
