= San Miguel Ejutla =

- Municipality and town
- Location in Mexico
- Coordinates: 16°35′N 96°44′W
- Country: Mexico
- State: Oaxaca

Area
  - Total: 40.83 km^{2} (15.76 sq mi)

Population (2005)
  - Total: 778
- Time zone: UTC-6 (Central Standard Time)
- Website: http://sanmiguelejutla.gob.mx/

San Miguel Ejutla is a town and municipality in Oaxaca in south-western Mexico. The municipality covers an area of 40.83 km^{2}. It is part of the Ejutla District in the south of the Valles Centrales Region.

As of 2005, the municipality had a total population of 778.
