= La Compañía, Oaxaca =

La Compañía
- Municipality and town
- Location in Mexico La Compañía (Mexico)
- Coordinates: 16°33′N 96°49′W
- Country: Mexico
- State: Oaxaca

Area
  - Total: 93.13 km^{2} (35.96 sq mi)

Population (2020)
  - Total: 3,607
- Time zone: UTC-6 (Central)
- Website: https://www.lacompaniaoaxaca.com/

La Compañía is a town and municipality in Oaxaca in southern Mexico. The municipality covers an area of 93.13 km^{2}. It is part of the Ejutla District in the south of the Valles Centrales Region.

In 2020, the municipality had a total population of 3,607.

The settlement's name comes from a local hacienda that formerly belonged to the Roman Catholic Church's Jesuit Order (known as La Compañía de Jesús in Spanish), the name of which was conserved following the expulsion of the Jesuits in the 1760s.

== Localities ==
There are five towns in the municipality of La Compañía: Agua Blanca, Agua del Espino, La Compañía, La Labor, and Río de Ejutla.

== Language ==
Most of the population speaks Spanish, and the indigenous communities in this municipality use eight different indigenous languages: Nahuatl, Mazahua, Chinanteco, Chatino, Mixteco, Triqui, Mixe, and Zapoteco.
