= Martin II =

Martin II may refer to:

- Pope Martin II, erroneous name for Pope Marinus I (r. 882–884)
- Martin II (bishop of Oviedo) (r. 1143–1156)
- Martin II of Sicily (r. 1409–1410), also King Martin of Aragon

== See also ==
- Martin I (disambiguation)
