= San Martín Huamelulpam =

- Municipality and town
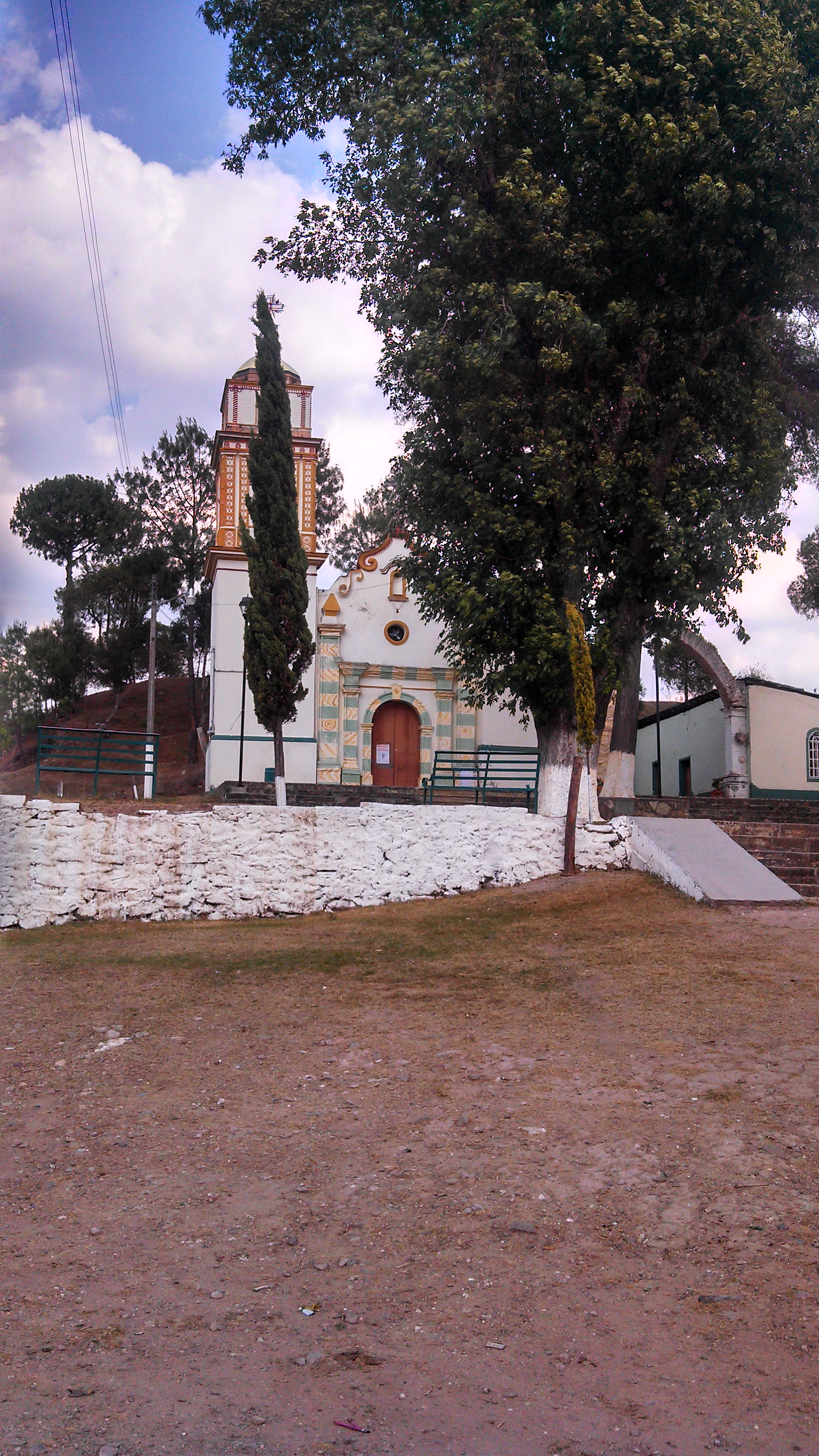
- Church of San Martín

- Location in Mexico
- Coordinates: 17°24′N 97°36′W
- Country: Mexico
- State: Oaxaca

Area
  - Total: 29.34 km^{2} (11.33 sq mi)

Population (2005)
  - Total: 1,012
- Time zone: UTC-6 (Central Standard Time)

San Martín Huamelulpam is a town and municipality in Oaxaca in south-western Mexico. The municipality covers an area of 29.34 km^{2} (11.33 sq mi). It is part of the Tlaxiaco District in the south of the Mixteca Region.

As of 2005, the municipality had a total population of 1,012.
