= San Martín Lachilá =

- Municipality and town
- Location in Mexico
- Coordinates: 16°37′N 96°51′W
- Country: Mexico
- State: Oaxaca

Area
  - Total: 49.76 km^{2} (19.21 sq mi)

Population (2005)
  - Total: 979
- Time zone: UTC-6 (Central Standard Time)

San Martín Lachilá is a town and municipality in Oaxaca in south-western Mexico. The municipality covers an area of 49.76 km^{2}. It is part of the Ejutla District in the south of the Valles Centrales Region.

As of 2005, the municipality had a total population of 979.
