= St. Martin's =

St. Martin's or St. Martins may refer to:

== Places ==
- St. Martins, Missouri, a city in the USA
- St Martin's, Isles of Scilly, an island off the Cornish coast, England
- St Martin's, North Yorkshire, England
- St Martins, Perth and Kinross, Scotland
- St Martin's, Shropshire, a village in England
- St Martin's, Guernsey, a parish in the Channel Islands
- St Martins (Hillingdon ward), a former electoral ward of Hillingdon London Borough Council that existed from 1978 to 2002
- St Martin's (Lambeth ward), electoral ward of Lambeth, London, from 1978 to 2002, and since 2022
- St Martins (Trafford ward), a former electoral ward of Trafford, Greater Manchester, from 1973 to 2003
- Saint Martins Parish, New Brunswick, Canada
  - Fundy-St. Martins, a village therein
- St Martins, New Zealand, a suburb of Christchurch, New Zealand
- St. Martin's Island, a coral reef island of Bangladesh in Bay of Bengal
- Saint Martin's Island a small island at the mouth of Green Bay in Wisconsin
- St. Martin's, Wisconsin, a former hamlet in the Town of Franklin, Milwaukee County, Wisconsin
- Saint Martins, Barbados, a village in Saint Philip Parish

== Religion and folklore ==
- St. Martin's Church (disambiguation), churches dedicated to St Martin
- St. Martin's Day, or Martinmas, falling on November 11
- St. Martin's Land, an enigmatic and likely mythical location associated with the legend of the green children of Woolpit

== Education ==
- St Martin's Catholic Academy, a secondary school in Leicestershire, England
- St Martin's College, an institution of higher education in the United Kingdom
- Saint Martin's University, Lacey, Washington
- St Martin's School (disambiguation)
- Central Saint Martins, a school in London, UK

== Sport ==
- St Martin's GAA (County Kilkenny), a Gaelic Athletic Association club based in the Ballyfoyle/Coon/Muckalee area of County Kilkenny, Ireland
- St. Martin's GAA (Wexford), a Gaelic Athletic Association club in Piercestown, County Wexford, Ireland

== Other uses ==
- St. Martin's Press, a New York publisher
- St Martin's Theatre, in the West End of London
- St. Martins station, a SEPTA Regional Rail station in Philadelphia, Pennsylvania, United States

== See also ==
- St. Martin (disambiguation)
