= San Martín de los Cansecos =

- Municipality and town
- Location in Mexico
- Coordinates: 16°39′N 96°44′W
- Country: Mexico
- State: Oaxaca

Area
  - Total: 45.93 km^{2} (17.73 sq mi)

Population (2015)
  - Total: 851
- Time zone: UTC-6 (Central Standard Time)

San Martín de los Cansecos is a town and municipality in Oaxaca in south-western Mexico. The municipality covers an area of 45.93 km^{2}. It is part of the Ejutla District in the south of the Valles Centrales Region.

As of 2015, the municipality had a total population of 851.
