= Saint Martin =

Saint Martin may refer to:

== People ==
- Martin of Vienne (c. 250 – ?), legendary third bishop of Vienne, France
- Martin of Tours (c. 316–397), Bishop of Tours, France
- Martin of Braga (c. 520–580), archbishop of Bracara Augusta in Gallaecia (now Braga in Portugal)
- Pope Martin I (c. 595–655), bishop of Rome
- Martin of Arades (died 726), monk in Corbie Abbey
- Martin of Soure (died 1146), Portuguese cleric canonized after martyrdom to the Moors of Cordoba
- Martin de Porres (1579–1639), Peruvian lay brother of the Dominican Order
- Martin Tho and Martin Tinh Duc Ta, two Vietnamese Martyrs who died between 1745 and 1862

=== People with the surname ===
- Alexis St. Martin (1802–1880), Canadian voyageur
- Fernande Saint-Martin (1927–2019), Canadian art critic, museologist, semiologist, visual arts theorist and writer
- Louis Claude de Saint-Martin (1743–1803), French mystic philosopher
- Louis St. Martin (1820–1893), American politician from Louisiana
- Paul Saint-Martin (1901–1940), French politician

== Places ==
=== Bangladesh ===
- St. Martin's Island, an island in Cox's Bazar District

=== Canada ===
- Saint-Martin, Quebec, a parish municipality in the province of Quebec
- Saint-Martin, Laval, Quebec, a residential section of the city of Laval in Quebec

=== France (Metropolitan) ===
- Saint-Martin, Bas-Rhin
- Saint-Martin, Gers
- Saint-Martin, Hautes-Pyrénées
- Saint-Martin, Meurthe-et-Moselle
- Saint-Martin-d'Ardèche, Ardèche département
- Saint-Martin-de-Fenouillet, Pyrénées-Orientales département
- Saint-Martin-de-Belleville, Savoie département
- Saint-Martin-de-Pallières, Var département
- Saint-Martin-de-Ré, Charente-Maritime département
- Saint-Martin-sur-Oust, Morbihan département

=== Switzerland ===
- Saint-Martin, Fribourg
- St. Martin, Graubünden
- Saint-Martin, Valais

=== United Kingdom ===
- Fornham St Martin, a village and parish in Suffolk
- St Martin-by-Looe, a civil parish in Cornwall, which doesn't contain St Martin
- St Martin-in-Meneage, Cornwall
- St Martin, Looe, a hamlet in the parish of Looe, the location of St Martin's Church
- St Martin's, Isles of Scilly
- Trimley St Martin, Suffolk
- Wareham St Martin, Dorset

==== Channel Islands ====
- Saint Martin, Guernsey
- St Martin, Jersey

=== United States ===
- St. Martin Parish, Louisiana
- St. Martin Island, Michigan
- St. Martin, Minnesota
- St. Martin Township, Stearns County, Minnesota
- St. Martin, Mississippi
- St. Martin, Ohio

=== Elsewhere ===
- Saint Martin (island), an island in the northeast Caribbean, divided between France and the Netherlands
  - Collectivity of Saint Martin, French portion of the island
  - Sint Maarten, Dutch portion of the island
- St. Martin's Island, a small island in the Bay of Bengal, Bangladesh
- Saint Martin of the Tigers, ghost town in southern Angola
- Saint Martin, a village in Freudenburg, Magdalensberg, Austria

== Schools ==
- St Martin de Porres, Adelaide, a Catholic school in Adelaide, South Australia
- St. Martin Catholic Secondary School, a school in Mississauga, Ontario, Canada
- St. Martin High School, a school located in Ocean Springs, Mississippi

== Transportation ==
- Saint-Martin station (Laval, Quebec), a former commuter rail station in Canada
- Saint-Martin station (Paris Metro), a former Paris Metro station
- Saint-Martin-d'Étampes station, a railroad station in Étampes, Essonne, France
- Caen Saint-Martin station, a former railroad station in Caen, France
- San Martin station, a commuter rail station in San Martin, California, US

== Other uses ==
- Saint Martin (grape) or Enfariné noir, a French wine grape
- San Martin Txiki, a figure in Basque mythology
- St. Martin Island Light, a lighthouse in Michigan
- Villa Saint Martin, a centre in Ignatian spirituality in Montreal, Canada

== See also ==
- Candes-Saint-Martin, in the Indre-et-Loire département, place where Saint Martin of Tours died
- St. Martin de Clare, Nova Scotia
- St Martin-in-the-Fields, an Anglican church in London
- St. Martin's (disambiguation)
- St. Martin's Church (disambiguation)
- St. Martin's Day, a feast on November 11, of St Martin of Tours
- Saint Martin Island (disambiguation)
- Saint-Martin-Vésubie in the Alpes Maritimes département
- San Martín (disambiguation)
- Sankt Martin (disambiguation)
- São Martinho (disambiguation)
- Sint Maarten (disambiguation)
