= Paul Saint-Martin =

French politician

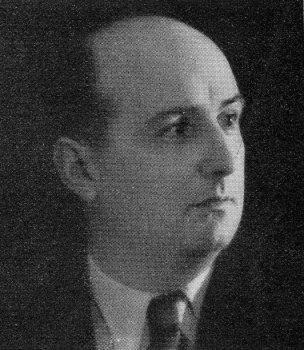
- Martin at unknown period

Deputy for Gers's 1st constituency
- In office 3 May 1936 – 15 June 1940

Personal details
- Born: Paul Jules Henri Saint-Martin; 4 September 1901 Simorre, France
- Died: 15 June 1940 (aged 38) Toulouse, France
- Party: SFIO
- Occupation: Teacher, activist

Paul Jules Henri Saint-Martin (4 September 1901 – 15 June 1940) was a French politician, teacher, and activist. A member of SFIO, he was elected in 1936 to represent Gers's 1st constituency in the National Assembly. He joined the air force at the start of the Second World War and died in a training accident in 1940.

== Life ==
Born in 1901 in Simorre, Gers, Saint-Martin worked as a teacher and served as the assistant treasurer for the Gers section of the National Teachers' Union in 1922. He campaigned in the 1920s for SFIO. Saint-Martin ran for the borough council of Lombez in 1928 and for the general council in 1931. In 1934, he became the leader of the socialist movement in Gers after the previous leader's dismissal. Under Saint-Martin's leadership, the SFIO gained wider influence in the area.

Saint-Martin was elected deputy for the 1st constituency of Gers on 3 May 1936 with 53% of the vote. In the assembly, he promoted two bills relating to the provisions of military recruitment and the organization of the army reserves. In February 1939, Saint-Martin defended producers during a debate on the price of wheat.

When the Second World War began, Saint-Martin was mobilized for the ballooning section of the French Air Force and given the rank of second lieutenant. He became an observer and was sent to train on bombers in Toulouse. On 15 June 1940, on his final training flight before deployment, Saint-Martin was killed in a crash. He was 38 years old.
