= Battle of San Martino (1482) =

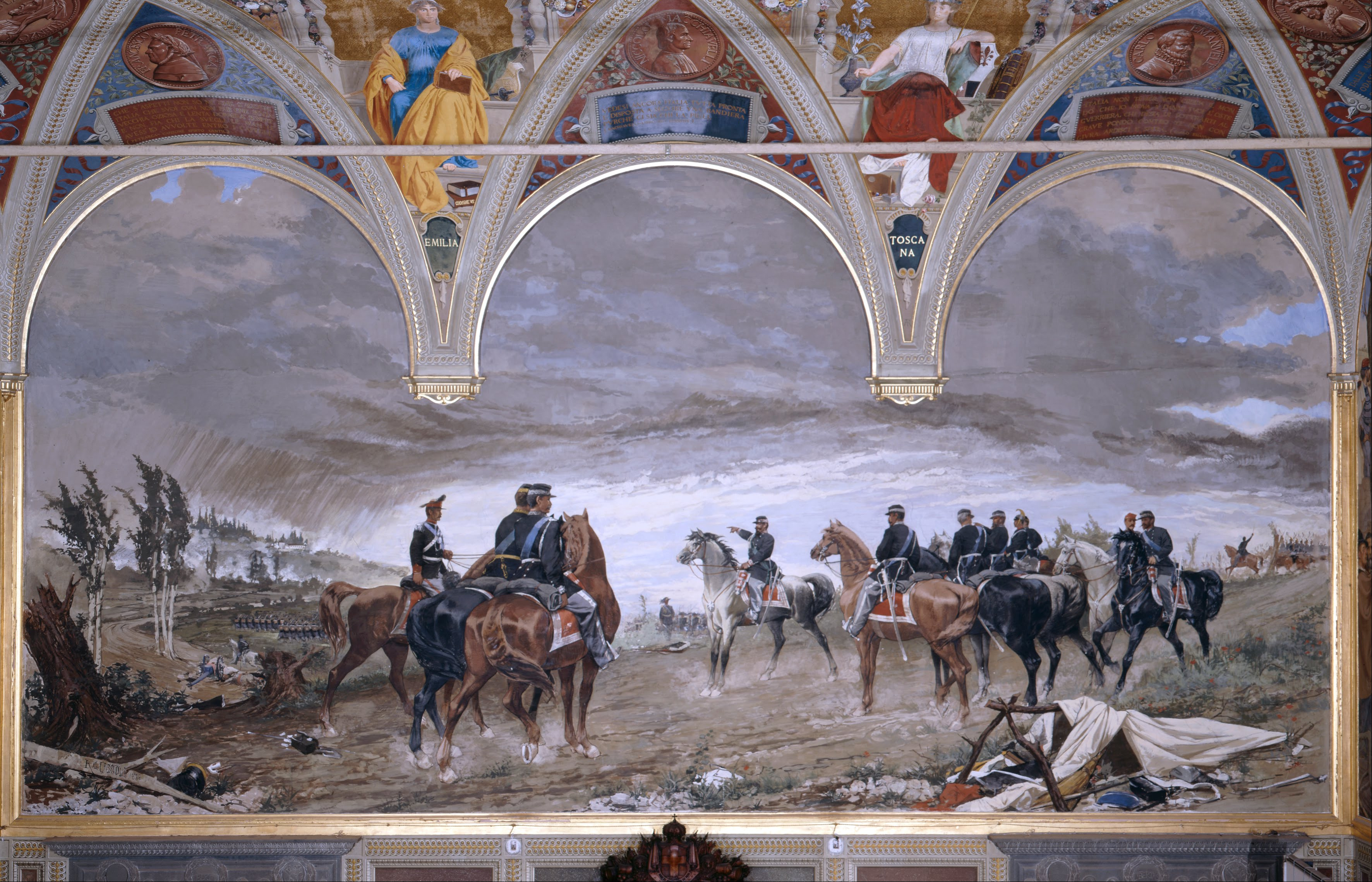
The Battle of San Martino (Amos Cassioli)

The Battle of San Martino in Italy was part of an ongoing conflict between two city states, the Venetians under Berterelli and the Florentines under Giovanni, in 1482. The battle was fought in swirling mists and, owing to their superior tactics, went the way of the Venetians.

After the Battle of Solferino fought nearby in 1859, also sometimes known as the Battle of San Martino, the village of San Martino was renamed San Martino della Battaglia. Nowadays it is a frazione of the comune of Desenzano del Garda.
