= San Martino del Vescovo =

Church building in Florence, Italy

Coordinates: 43°46′15.07″N 11°15′24.59″E

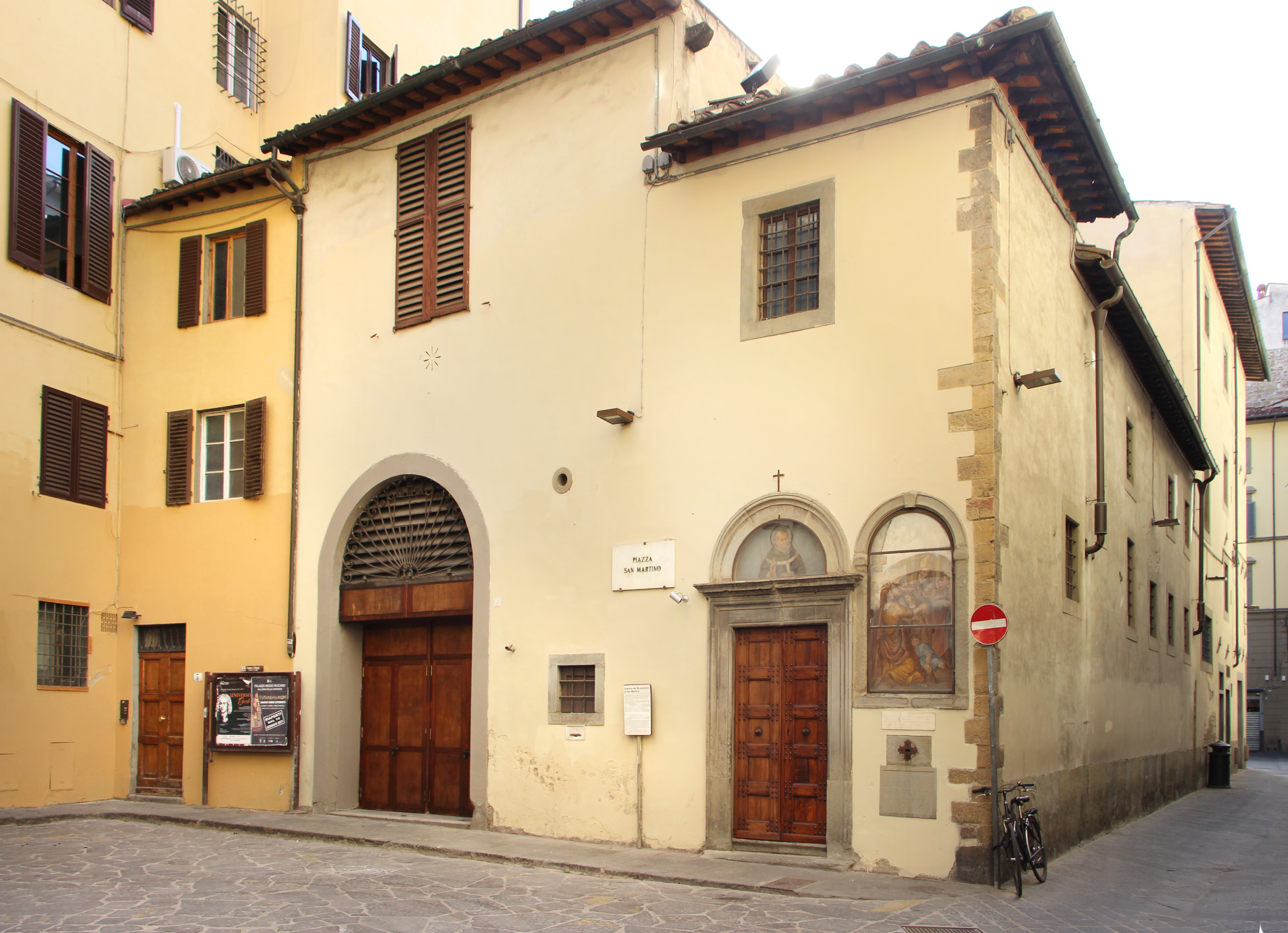
The entrance

San Martino del Vescovo, also known as the Oratorio dei Buonomini di San Martino, is a Roman Catholic parish church, located in the small piazza of the same name in Florence, Italy.

The ancient church of San Martino del Vescovo (Saint Martin of the Bishop) was an established place of worship in medieval Florence. Its documented existence can be traced back to the year 986. Either founded or endowed by the Bishop of Fiesole, the church was originally orientated differently to the existing oratory, and the building essentially caused the once sizeable piazza in which it was built to be bisected. This operation formed what is now known as the Piazza San Martino, which opens out in front of the Buonomini’s oratory and the Piazza del Cimatore.

The lay confraternity of the Buonomini (otherwise known as the Procurators of the Shamed Poor of Florence) was formed to benefit the poveri vergognosi ("the shamed poor"), as a grey stone plaque below a charity box announces on the façade. It was founded in 1442 by St Antonino Pierozzi and aided by a donation from Cosimo de' Medici the Elder. At some point in the past (certainly prior to 1482), their charitable operation moved from the house of Primerano di Jacopo, the shoemaker and one of the initial twelve good men, to the oratory in which they still reside to this day.

Nine of the interior frescoes are attributed to the workshop of Domenico Ghirlandaio although their dating remains a contentious issue. Eight of the cycle of ten murals are based on the Seven Works of Corporal Mercy and show the Buonomini performing activities based on these tasks. The brothers are depicted giving food and drink to the thirsty, clothing the naked, visiting the sick, giving shelter to pilgrims, releasing a debtor from gaol, burying the dead, witnessing an espousal and making an initial visit to a family in need. The two frescoes which flank the altar show scenes from the life of St Martin of Tours. The lunette to the left of the altar shows Martin dividing his cloak for the beggar and the one to the right, depicts The Dream of Saint Martin; the latter has recently been attributed to Lorenzo di Credi. Inside is an altarpiece of a Madonna with Infant Jesus and St. John by Niccolò Soggi and a bust of St Antoninus which is attributed to Verrocchio.

The Buonomini are to this day active in Florence although their charitable activities remain secret. Each Friday afternoon the twelve good men meet in the Sala Riunioni to discuss the confraternity's business. The frescoes and the interior of the oratory underwent a sympathetic restoration program in April 2011.

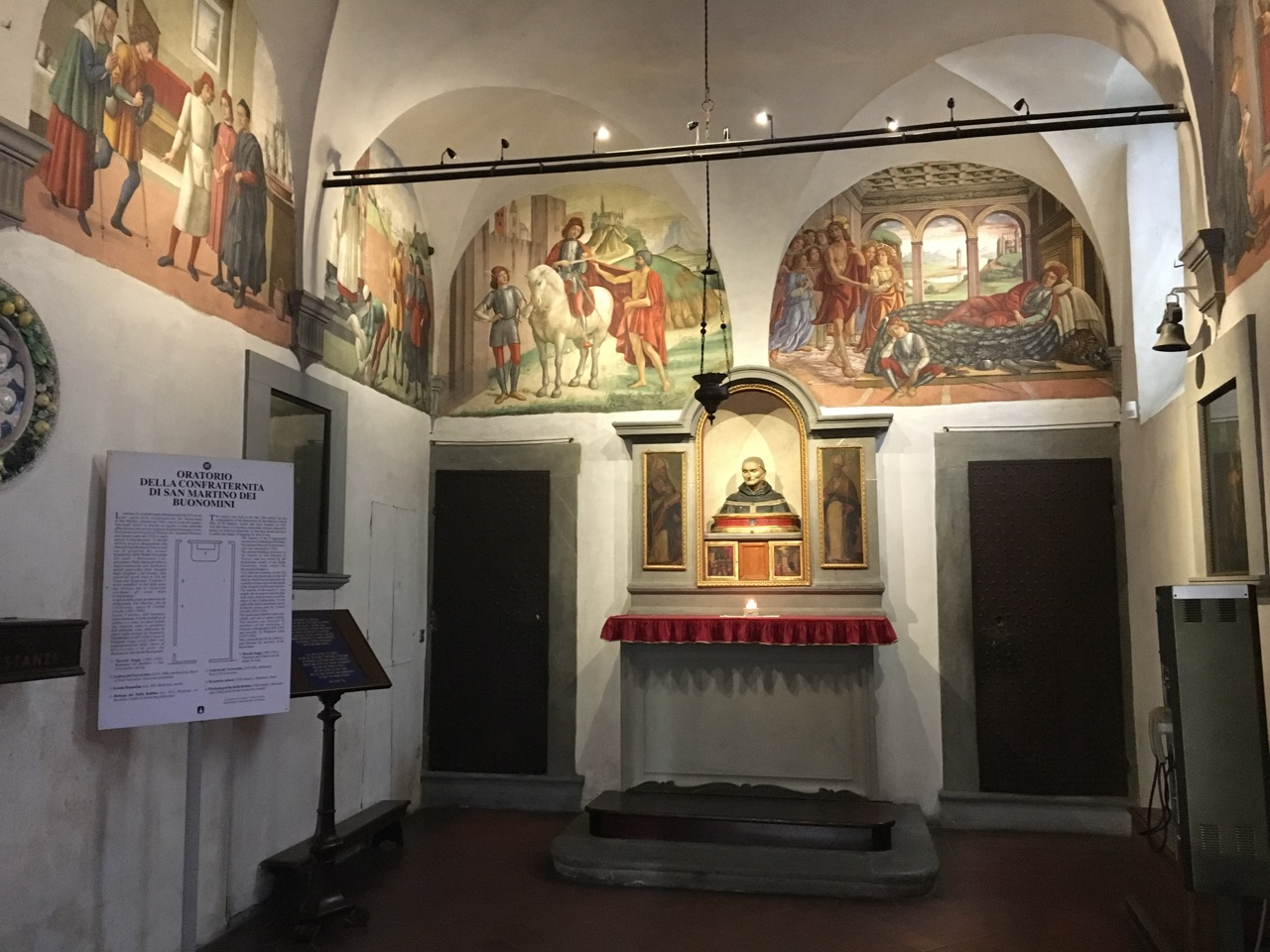
Interior of L'oratorio dei Buonomini with frescoes by the workshop of Ghirlandaio, 1478–81

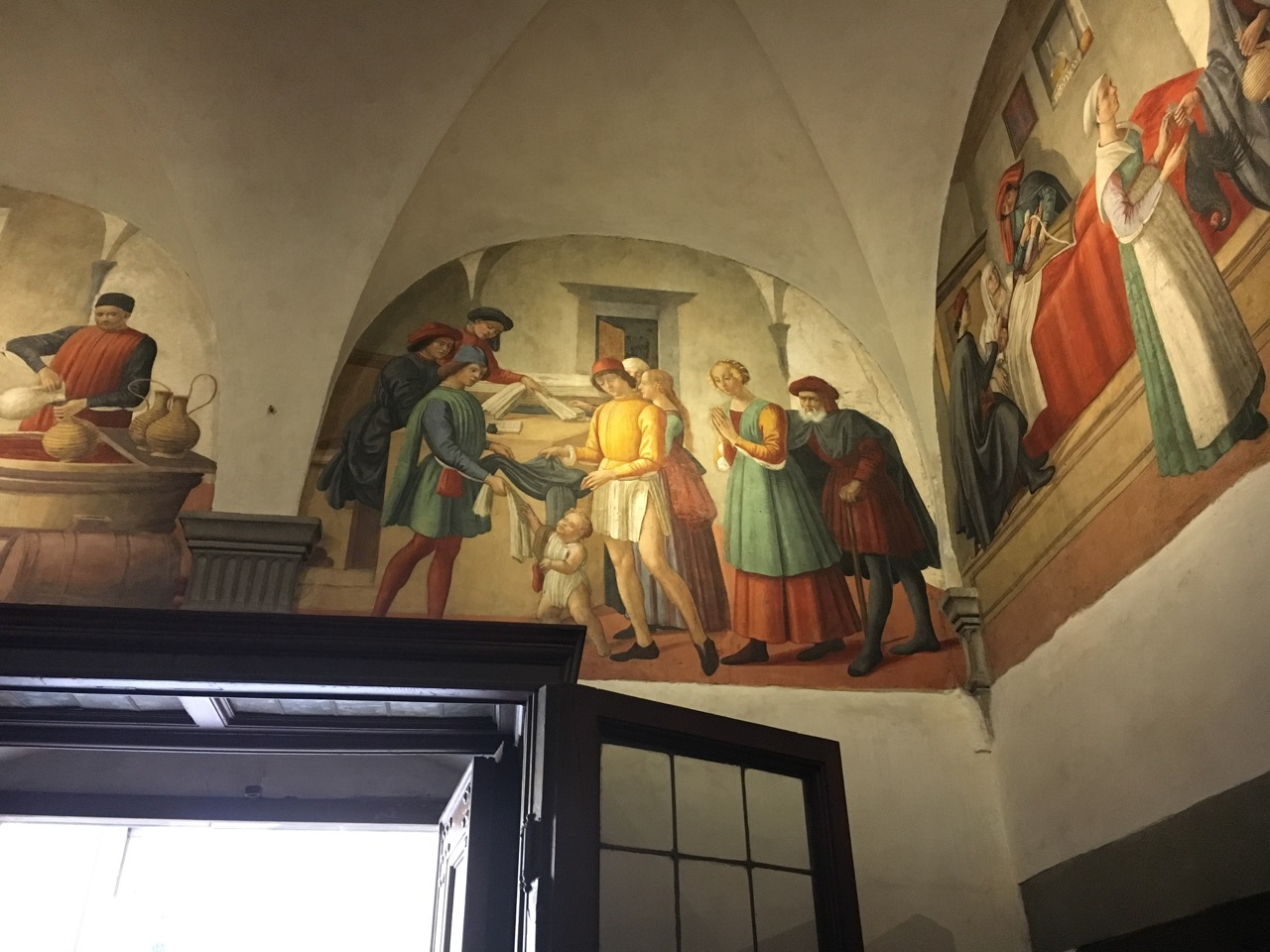
Workshop of Ghirlandaio, Works of Mercy: To Clothe the Naked, fresco, 1478–81

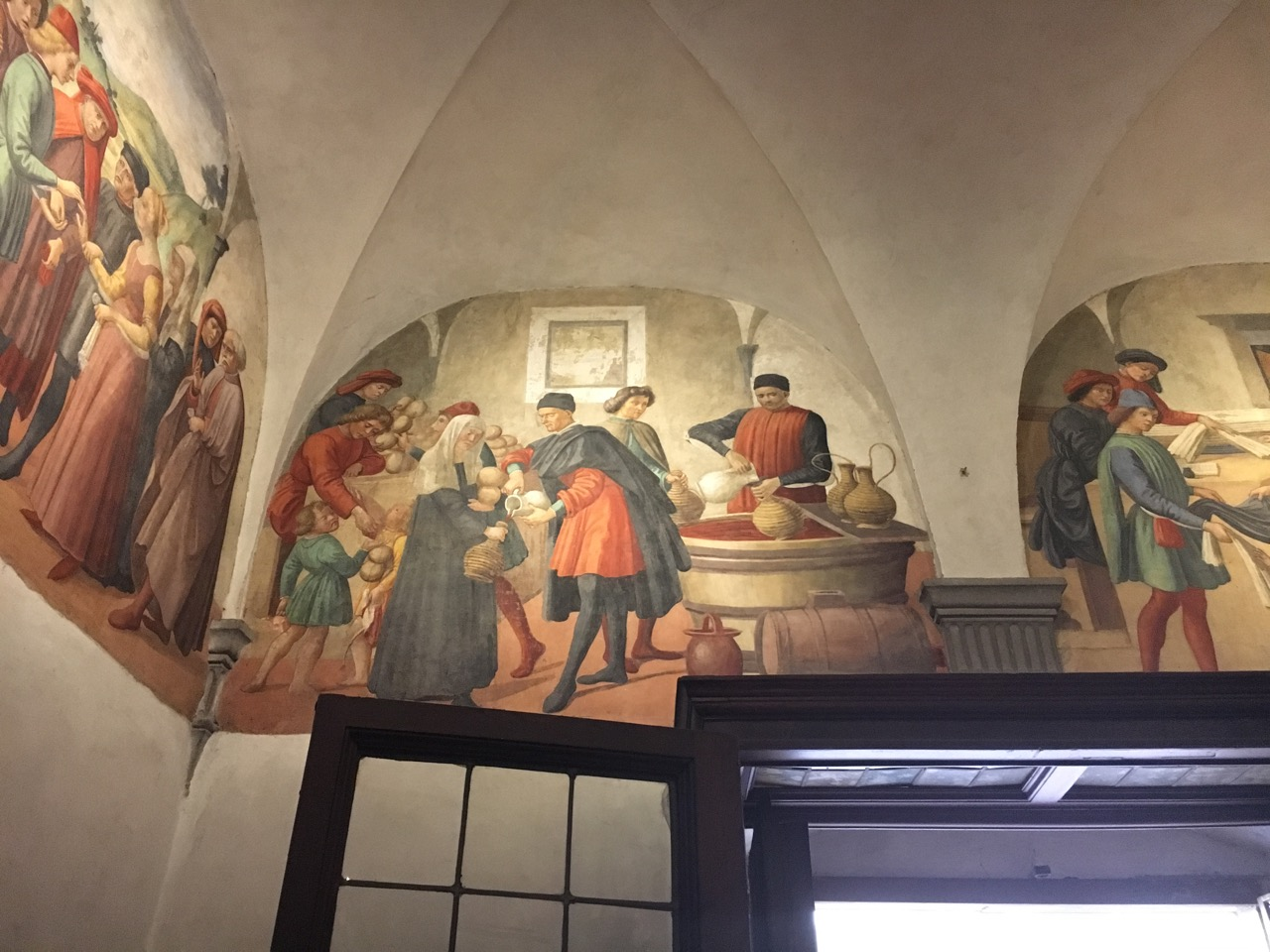
Workshop of Ghirlandaio, Works of Mercy: Water to the Thirsty, fresco, 1478–81

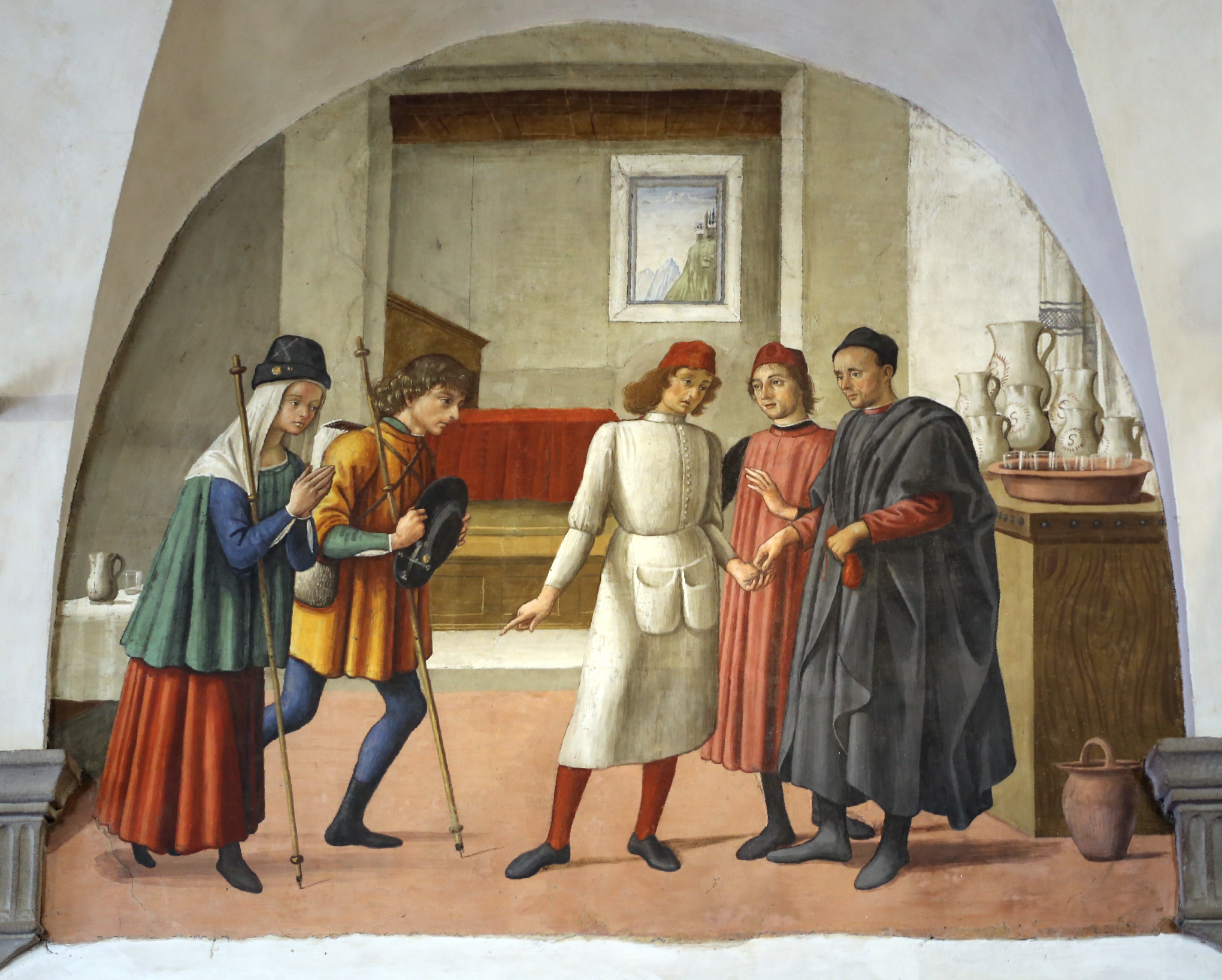
Workshop of Ghirlandaio, Works of Mercy: Welcome Pilgrims, fresco, 1478–81

== Sources ==
- Borsook, Eve (1991). Vincent Cronin (ed.). The Companion Guide to Florence. Harper Collins. p. 95. ISBN 000215139-1.
- Bargellini, Pietro. I Buonomini di San Martino. Cassa di Risparmio di Firenze.
- Hughes-Johnson, Samantha. 'Early Medici Patronage and the Confraternity of the Buonomini di San Martino' Confraternitas, vol. 22, pp. 3–25, 2012, Toronto.
- Hughes-Johnson, Samantha. 'Divergent Hands: Two Scenes from the Life of Saint Martin of Tours in the Oratorio dei Buonomini di San Martino' Arte Cristiana, 2013.
- Hughes-Johnson, Samantha. 'Fashioning Family Honour in Renaissance Florence: The Language of Women's Clothing and Gesture in the Frescoes of the Confraternity of the Buonomini di San Martino in Florence' Confraternitas, vol. 23, pp. 3–31, 2013, Toronto.
- Hughes-Johnson, Samantha. 'I Buonomini di San Martino: Patrons and Facilitators of the Visual Arts in Quattrocento Florence' Confraternitas, vol. 25, pp. 5–31, 2014, Toronto.
