= São Martinho =

São Martinho (Portuguese for "Saint Martin") may refer to the following places:

== Places ==
=== In Angola ===
- São Martinho dos Tigres

=== In Brazil ===
- São Martinho, Rio Grande do Sul
- São Martinho, Santa Catarina

=== In Portugal ===
- São Martinho das Amoreiras, a parish in the municipality of Odemira
- São Martinho do Porto, a parish in the municipality of Alcobaça
- São Martinho de Angueira, a parish in the municipality of Miranda do Douro
- São Martinho (Alcácer do Sal), a parish in the municipality of Alcácer do Sal
- São Martinho (Covilhã), a parish in the municipality of Covilhã
- São Martinho (Seia), a parish in the municipality of Seia
- São Martinho (Sintra), a parish in the municipality of Sintra
- São Martinho (Funchal), a parish in the municipality of Funchal, Madeira
- São Martinho River, a river that is a tributary of the Sado River in Portugal

== Other ==
- São Martinho, Portuguese Navy galleon
- São Martinho, one of the world's largest sugarcane processing operations
