= Sankt Martin =

Sankt Martin (abbr. St. Martin, German pronunciation: [zaŋkt ˈmaʁtiːn], lit. 'Saint Martin') may refer to the following places:

- Sankt Martin, Germany, in Rhineland-Palatinate, Germany
- in Austria:
  - Sankt Martin, Lower Austria, in Lower Austria
  - Sankt Martin im Innkreis, in Upper Austria
  - Sankt Martin im Mühlkreis, in Upper Austria
  - Sankt Martin an der Raab, in Burgenland
  - Markt Sankt Martin, in Burgenland
  - Sankt Martin am Tennengebirge, in Salzburg
  - Sankt Martin bei Lofer, in Salzburg
  - Sankt Martin am Grimming, in Styria
  - Sankt Martin am Wöllmißberg, in Styria
  - Sankt Martin im Sulmtal, in Styria
- St. Martin, Graubünden, in Graubünden, Switzerland
- in Italy:
  - St. Martin in Thurn, the German name for San Martin de Tor, South Tyrol
  - St. Martin in Passeier, South Tyrol
- Sankt Martin, the German name for Târnăveni, Romania
- Turz-Sankt Martin, the former name of Martin, Slovakia

== See also ==
- St. Martin
